= 1966 in the Vietnam War =

← 1965 1967 →
Location	Vietnam

Belligerents
Anti-Communist forces: South Vietnam; United States; South Korea; Australia; Philippines; New Zealand; Kingdom of Laos (Taiwan) Republic of China	Communist forces: North Vietnam (Provisional Revolutionary Government of the Republic of South Vietnam) Viet Cong (Laos) Pathet Lao; People's Republic of China; Soviet Union; North Korea

Strength
South Vietnam: 735,900; United States: 485,300; South Korea: 45,566; Thailand : 244; Australia: 4,525; Philippines: 2,061 New Zealand: 155	Viet Cong and North Vietnam: 282,000

Casualties and losses
US: 6,350 killed South Vietnam: 11,953 killed Australia 63 killed	U.S estimate: 55,524 killed

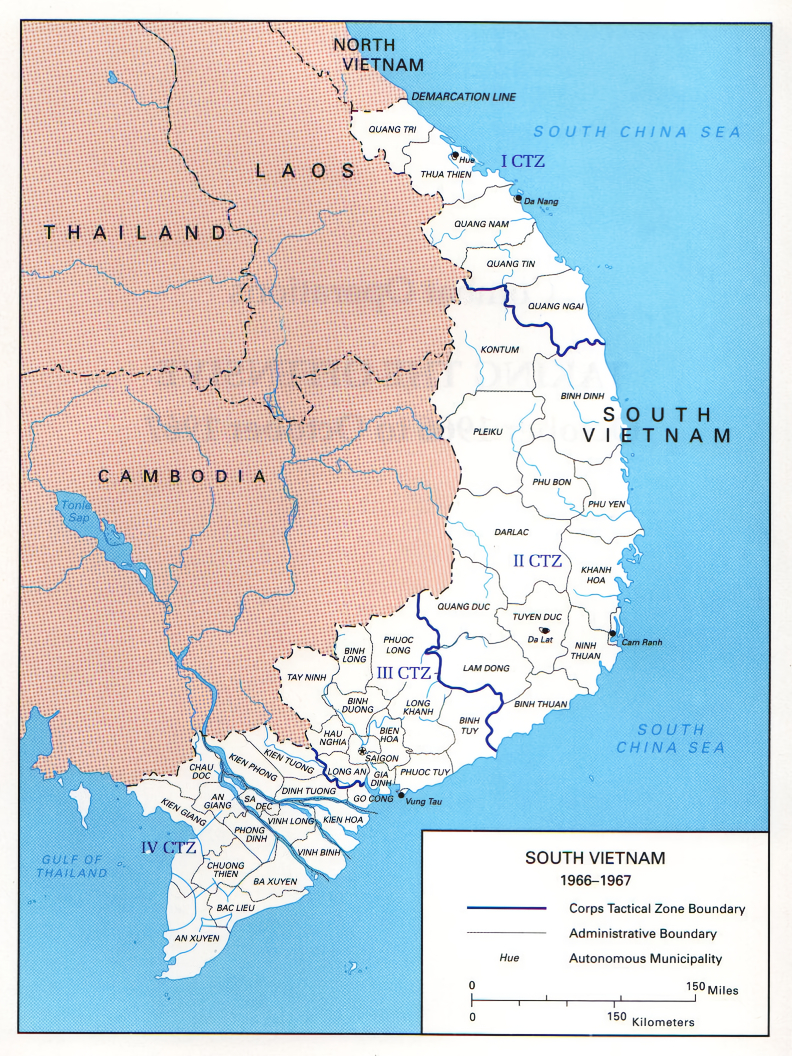
A map of South Vietnam showing provincial boundaries and names and military zones: 1, II, III, and IV Corps.

At the beginning of 1966, the number of U.S. military personnel in South Vietnam totaled 184,300. South Vietnamese military forces totaled 514,000 including the army (ARVN) and the Regional Force and Popular Force (the "Ruff-Puffs") militias. The North Vietnamese People's Army of Vietnam (PAVN) numbered 400,000, most still in North Vietnam. 50,000 PAVN cadre and soldiers infiltrated South Vietnam during 1965. Group 559, charged with transporting supplies down the Ho Chi Minh Trail to supply PAVN troops in both South Vietnam and Laos, numbered 24,400 personnel. The U.S. estimated the number of Viet Cong (VC) and PAVN soldiers in South Vietnam at nearly 280,000 by June 1966, including part-time guerrillas. A pause in the bombing of North Vietnam by U.S. warplanes had been announced by President Johnson on 24 December and remained in effect.

== January ==
Writing in Harper's Magazine retired U.S. general James M. Gavin proposed an enclave strategy where U.S. forces would defend coastal enclaves where most of the population and economic activity was concentrated and act as a strategic reserve, leaving the ARVN to fight the PAVN/VC further inland. This strategy was designed not to achieve victory, but rather to create a stalemate forcing the PAVN/VC to seek a negotiated solution. In later years the "Gavin Plan" would become known as "light at the top, heavy at the bottom" reflecting the population concentration of South Vietnam.

"The Ballad of the Green Berets" by Staff sergeant Barry Sadler is released. It became the No. 1 hit in the U.S. for the five weeks spanning March 1966.

1–8 January

Operation Marauder was conducted by the U.S. 173rd Airborne Brigade and the 1st Battalion, Royal Australian Regiment (1 RAR) in the Plain of Reeds, Mekong Delta. The operation resulted in 114 VC and three U.S. killed.

3 January

The PAVN bombarded a Special Forces Civilian Irregular Defense Group camp at Khe Sanh Combat Base near the Vietnamese Demilitarized Zone (DMZ) with 120mm mortars, the heaviest weapon they had used in the war. Defending the combat base were American and South Vietnamese Special Forces, Nung and Bru (Montagnard) irregulars and militia forces.

In his message to the Tricontinental Conference, Che Guevara called for creating "two, three many Vietnams." to fight imperialism in the southern hemisphere.

6 January

The Student Nonviolent Coordinating Committee (SNCC) became the first African-American civil rights organization to publicly oppose the war.

7 January

Commander of Military Assistance Command, Vietnam General William Westmoreland is Time magazine's Man of the year.

A Claymore mine exploded at Tan Son Nhut International Airport gate, killing two persons and injuring 12.

8–14 January

Operation Crimp was a joint US-Australian military operation in the Ho Bo Woods, 20 kilometres (12 mi) north of Cu Chi in Binh Duong Province, about 56 kilometres (35 mi) north-east of Saigon. The operation was conducted by the U.S. 1st Infantry Division and 173rd Airborne Brigade and 1 RAR resulted in 128 VC killed and 92 captured and 14 U.S. and 8 Australians killed.

9-11 January

Operation Flying Tiger VI was an ARVN and ROK Capital Division search and destroy operation in Bình Định Province. The operation resulted in 192 VC and 11 ARVN/ROK killed.

12 January

In his State of the Union Address President Lyndon Johnson told Congress and television viewers that the nation could afford both the funding of the cost of social programs and an ongoing war, saying "I believe that we can continue the Great Society while we fight in Vietnam."

15 January - 25 February

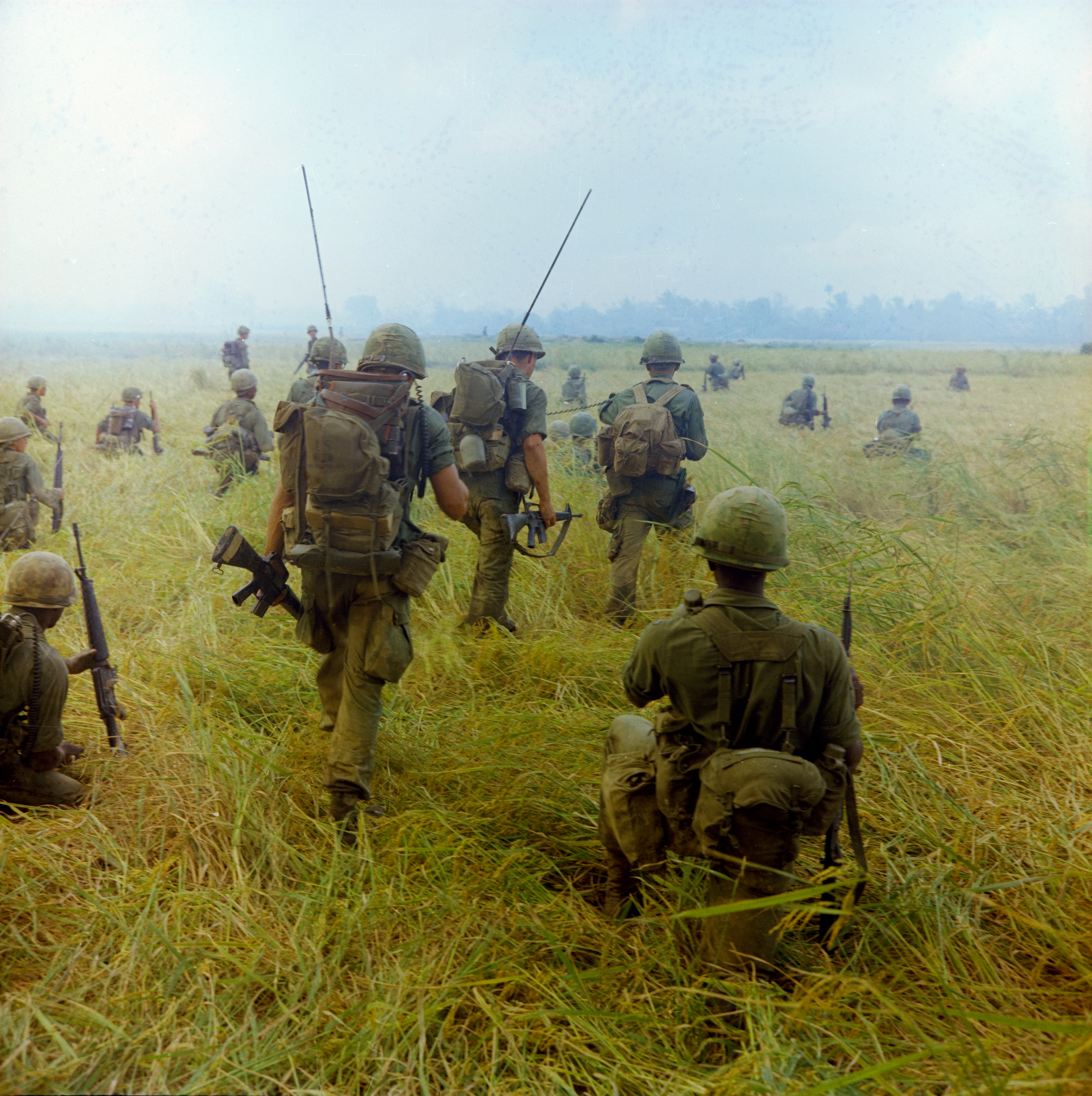
101st Airborne soldiers advancing through field during Operation Van Buren

Operation Van Buren was a harvest security operation conducted by the 1st Brigade, 101st Airborne Division and the South Korean 2nd Marine Brigade in the Tuy Hòa Valley, Phú Yên Province. The operation resulted in 346 PAVN killed and 33 captured, 55 U.S. and 45 Koreans killed.

17 January

VC in Kien Tuong Province detonated a mine under a highway bus, killing 26 civilians, seven of them children. Eight persons were injured and three missing.

25 January

A USAF C-123K lost power and crashed after take-off from An Khe, en route to Bong Son killing all 46 persons on board.

26 January

In a meeting with Johnson Republican senator John Sherman Cooper urged him to forgo his announced plan to resume bombing of North Vietnam and negotiate a settlement instead.

28 January

The U.S. Selective Service System announced that it would change its guidelines for conscription of college students and college-bound high school graduates, by barring "Class 2-S" draft deferments for students whose grades were in the lower half of their freshman class, the lower one-third of their sophomore class or the lower one-fourth of their junior class.

28 January - 17 February

Operation Double Eagle was conducted by U.S. 1st Marine Division and ARVN 2nd Division in Quảng Ngãi Province. The operation resulted in 312 VC killed and 19 captured and 24 Marines killed.

28 January - 6 March

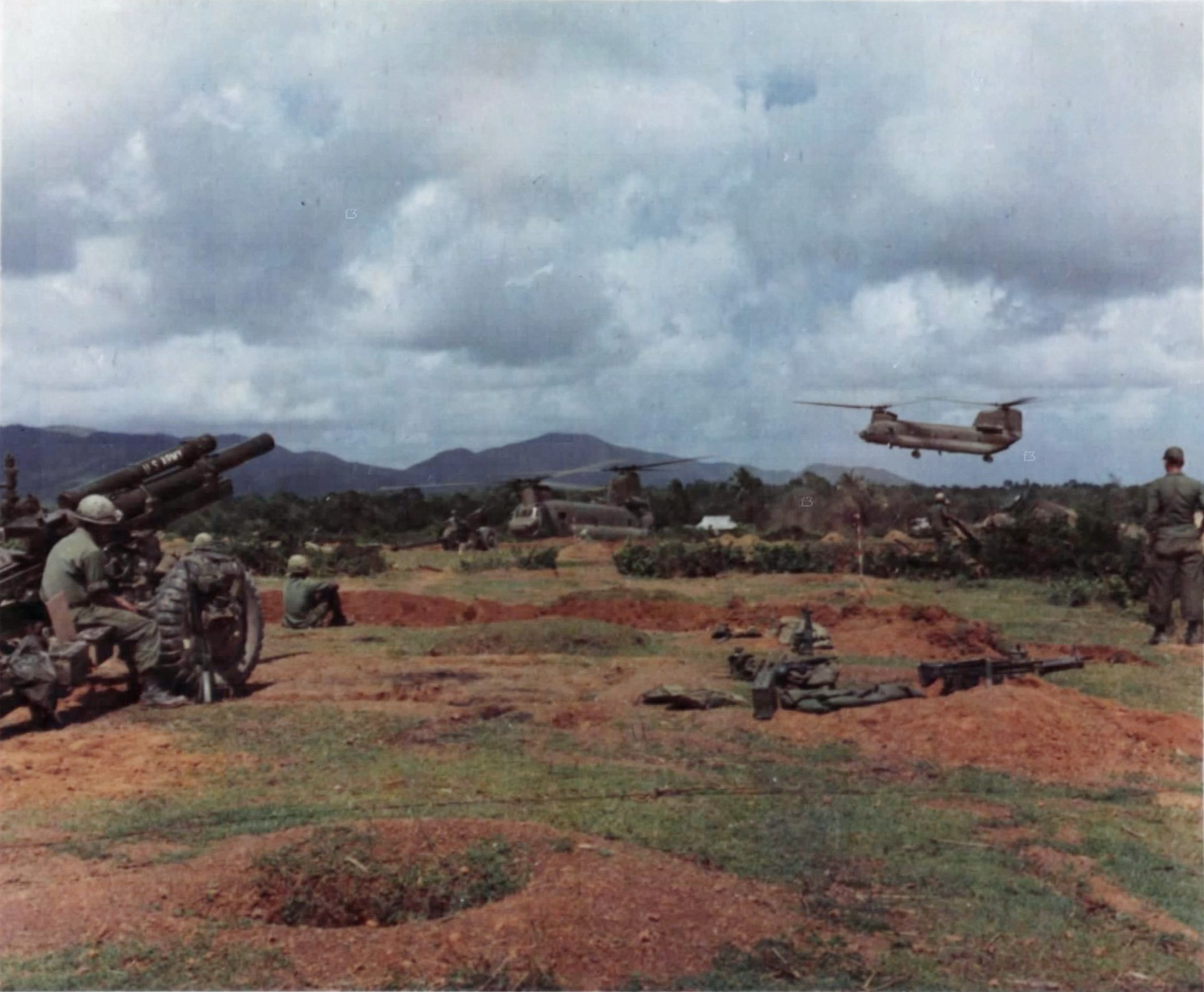
1st Cavalry Division CH-47s deploy artillery during Operation Masher

Operation Masher was a combined U.S., ARVN and Republic of Korea Army operation in Bình Định Province conducted by the U.S. 1st Cavalry Division, ARVN 22nd Division and ROK Capital Division. The name "Operation Masher" was changed to "Operation White Wing", because Masher was deemed too crude for 'nation-building' by the White House. The operation resulted in 2,150 PAVN/VC, 288 U.S. and 10 Koreans killed. Masher failed to result in any decisive victories by the allies, but temporarily disrupted PAVN/VC control of the rural areas of the province. Masher and subsequent operations in Binh Dinh created large numbers of refugees who fled their homes to escape the fighting.

29 January

The VC killed a Catholic priest, Father Phan Khac Dau, 74, at Thanh Tri, Kien Tuong province. Five other civilians, including a church officer, were also killed.

31 January

After a 37-day moratorium that had started on 24 December 1965, the U.S. resumed Operation Rolling Thunder, the bombing of North Vietnam. Among the first targets destroyed were a bridge at Đồng Hới, a highway ferry complex in Thanh Hóa Province and barges near the city of Vinh.

== February ==
2 February

At Belmore Park in Sydney, three young Australian men became the first persons to burn their draft registration cards as a protest against Australia's participation in the war.

Special Forces Master Sergeant Donald W. Duncan appeared on the cover of Ramparts under the caption "I quit". He was one of the first service members to speak out against the war.

A VC squad ambushed a jeep of South Vietnamese information workers, killing six and wounding one in Hậu Nghĩa Province.

4 February

Senator J. William Fulbright, chairman of the Senate Committee on Foreign Relations began a series of hearings on the war. Johnson took Fulbright's criticism of the war as a personal betrayal by his former friend.

6 February to 6 March

Operation Thừa Thiên 177 was an ARVN 1st Division operation in Thừa Thiên Province. The operation resulted in 183 PAVN/VC and 17 ARVN killed.

7 February

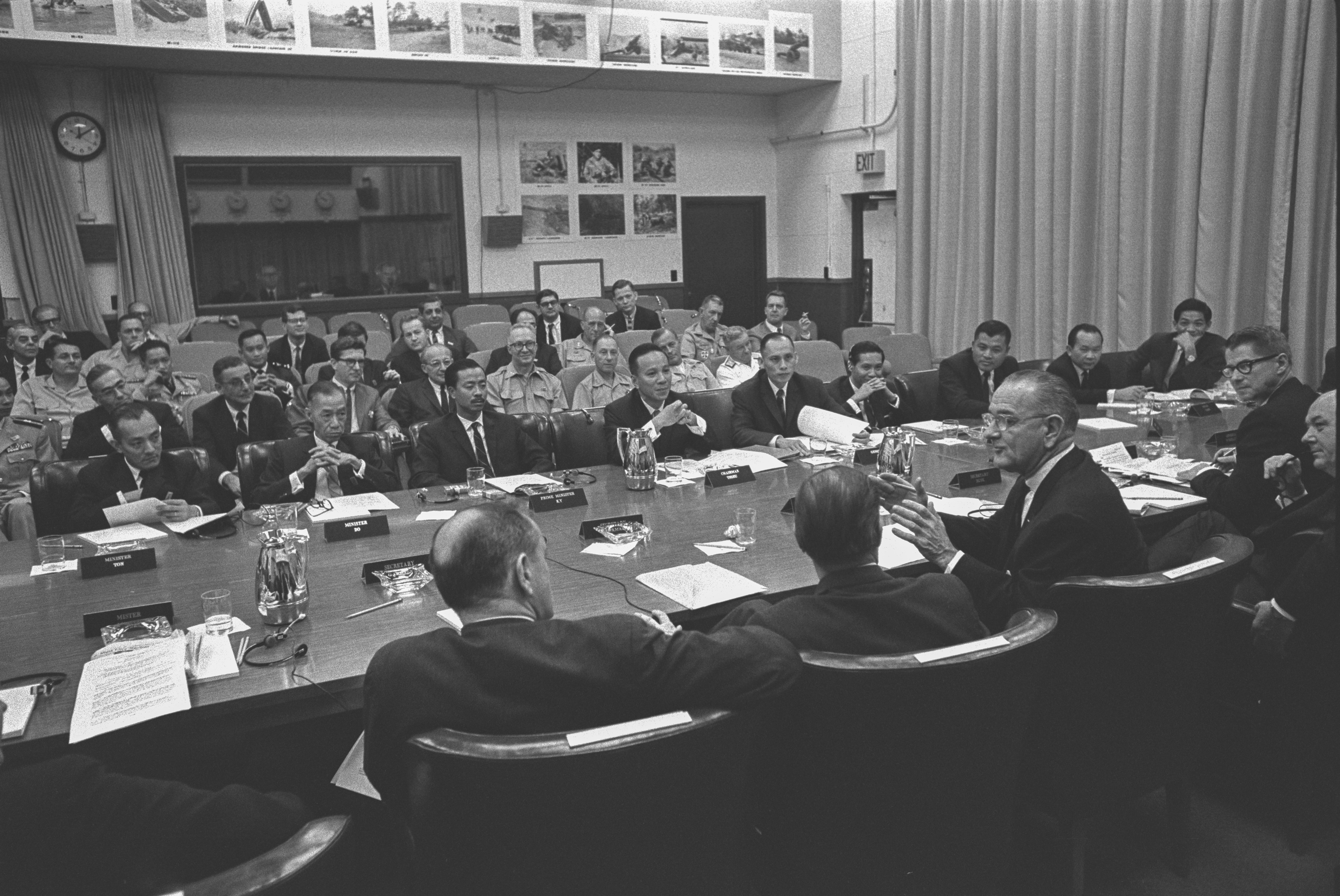
Honolulu Conference

In an apparent attempt to upstage the Fulbright Hearings, Johnson and Premier Nguyễn Cao Kỳ of South Vietnam convened with other officials at Camp H. M. Smith in Honolulu, Hawaii to discuss the course of the war.

Television was broadcast in South Vietnam for the first time, as the United States Navy used Stratovision sending a C-121 Constellation to carry transmitting equipment, videotape machines and a small television studio aloft. The C-121 took off from Tan Son Nhut Air Base, climbed to 10,500 feet (3,200 m), then flew in a slow oval pattern at 170 miles per hour (270 km/h) and, at 19:30, transmitted the first THVN programs to outdoor television sets that had been tuned to Channel 9.

7 February - May 1972

The USAF begins Operation Shed Light to develop night and adverse weather strike capabilities to interdict PAVN/VC operations.

10 February

The People's Republic of China (PRC) accused the Soviet Union of forcing North Vietnam into peace negotiations with the U.S.

13 February

A USAF Firebee 147E unmanned aircraft with electronic intelligence monitors was sent on a one-way mission to be shot down by the SA-2 antiaircraft radar and missile defense system being used by North Vietnam. The drone was picked up by the radar and destroyed, but not before "finally acquiring the long-mysterious command uplink and downlink signals" that were used in the SA-2 operation and relaying the data back to a nearby DC-130 aircraft; acquisition of the signal led to developing methods to jam it as well.

Operation An Dan 14/66 was an ARVN operation in Long An Province. the operation resulted in 150 VC and 21 ARVN killed.

14 February

Two mines exploded beneath a bus and a three-wheeled taxi on a road near Tuy Hòa, killing 48 farm laborers and injuring seven others.

15-21 February

Operation Thang Long 234 was an ARVN operation in Darlac Province. The operation resulted in 270 VC and 62 ARVN killed.

16-19 February

In the First Battle of Nakhang the PAVN attacked the Royal Lao Army (RLA) garrison at Lima Site 36 in Na Khang. The attack was successful but U.S. air support inflicted heavy losses on the PAVN.

17 February

The "Three-point Proposal" for ending the war was presented at the United Nations headquarters in New York by a spokesman for Secretary-General U Thant, calling for cessation of bombing of North Vietnam by the United States, a scaling down of military activities and an agreement by all sides to enter into discussions with representatives of the VC.

18 February

The PRC consulate in Phong Saly, Laos, was heavily strafed by gunfire and the Beijing government charged that four American fighter jets had attacked "with more than 600 bullets", as well as dropping eight bombs to the east of the city, 20 miles (32 km) from the border with China.

Second Lieutenant Carol Ann Drazba and Second Lieutenant Elizabeth Ann Jones were among seven killed in a helicopter crash northeast of Tan Son Nhut Air Base. They were the first of eight women in the U.S. military killed in Vietnam.

19 February

U.S. Senator Robert F. Kennedy became the first member of the Senate to break with President Johnson in proposing that the VC be allowed "a share of power and responsibility" in peace talks with the United States.

19 February to 1 March

Operation Double Eagle II was conducted by the BLT 2nd Battalion, 3rd Marines, 2nd Battalion, 9th Marines and 2nd Battalion, 7th Marines in the Quế Sơn Valley. The operation resulted in 125 VC killed and ten captured for the loss of 6 Marines killed.

21-5 February

Operation Mastiff was conducted by the U.S. 1st Infantry Division in Dầu Tiếng District against the PAVN 9th Division. The operation resulted in 61 PAVN and 17 U.S. killed.

22 February to 2 March

Operation Lam Son 235 was a search and destroy operation conducted by two regiments of the ARVN 1st Division in Quảng Trị Province. The operation resulted in 444 PAVN/VC and 35 ARVN killed.

23-4 February

The Battle of Suoi Bong Trang was fought on the night of 23–24 February 1966 between the U.S. 1st Brigade, 1st Infantry Division and Australian 1 RAR and PAVN/VC. The battle occurred during Operation Rolling Stone, a major American security operation to protect engineers building a tactically important road in the vicinity of Tan Binh, in central Binh Duong Province, 30 kilometres (19 mi) northwest of Bien Hoa Air Base. The battle resulted 154 PAVN/VC killed and 15 captured and 11 U.S. killed.

23 February - 29 March

The 1st Marine Division deployed to South Vietnam, establishing its headquarters at Chu Lai Base Area.

25 February to 24 March

Operation Garfield was conducted by the 3rd Brigade, 25th Infantry Division in Darlac Province. The operation resulted in 122 PAVN/VC and 21 U.S. killed.

26 February - 3 March

Operation New York was a sweep operation conducted by the U.S. 3rd Marine Division northwest and east of Phu Bai Combat Base. The operation resulted in 120 VC killed and seven captured and 17 Marines killed.

26 February - 25 March

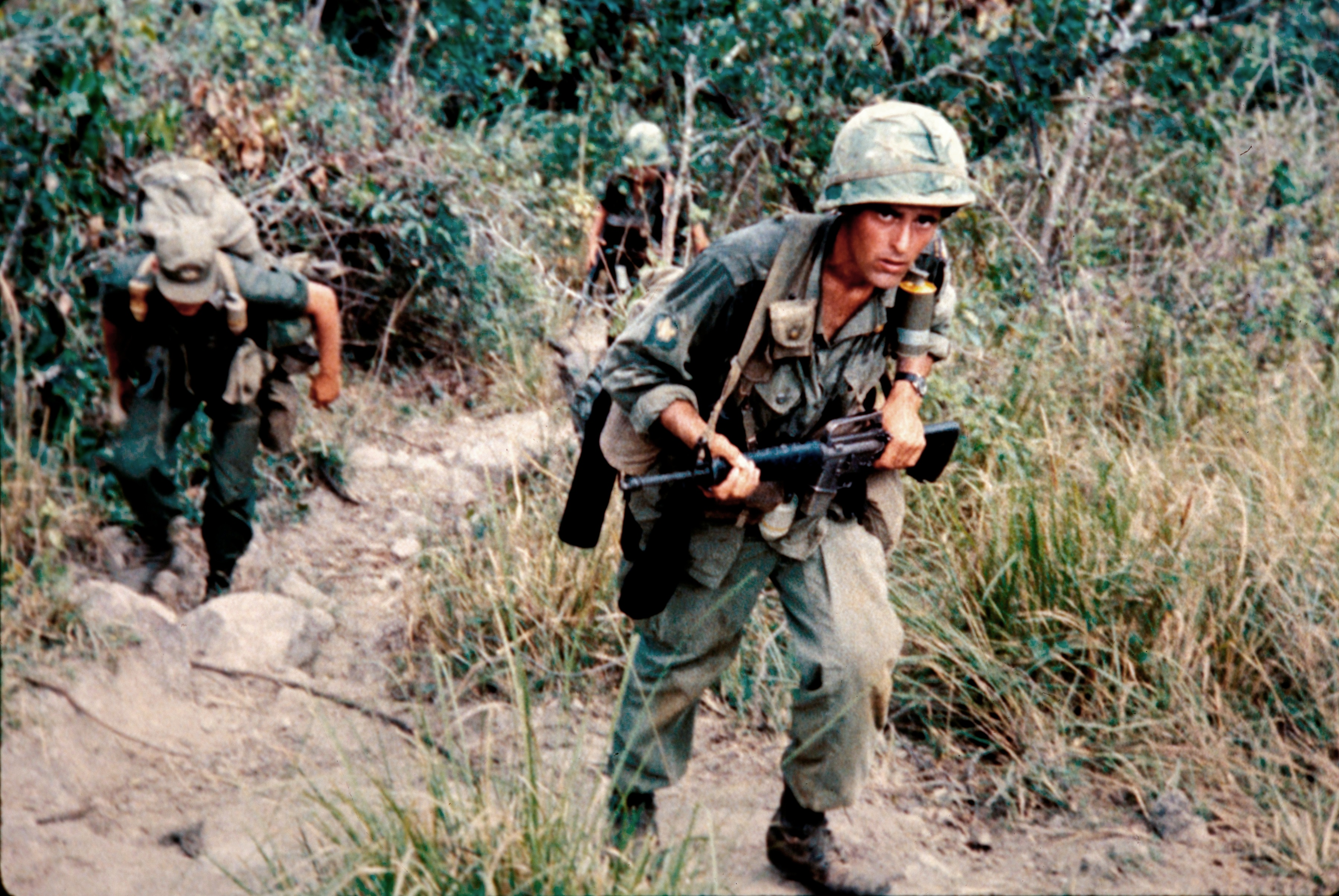
101st Airborne soldiers during Operation Harrison

Operation Harrison was conducted by the 1st Brigade, 101st Airborne Division in Phú Yên Province. The operation resulted in 288 PAVN killed and 35 captured and 43 U.S. killed and two missing.

== March ==
3-8 March

Operation Cocoa Beach was conducted by the U.S. 3rd Brigade, 1st Infantry Division along Highway 13 near Lai Khê. The operation resulted in 199 VC and 15 U.S. killed.

4-7 March

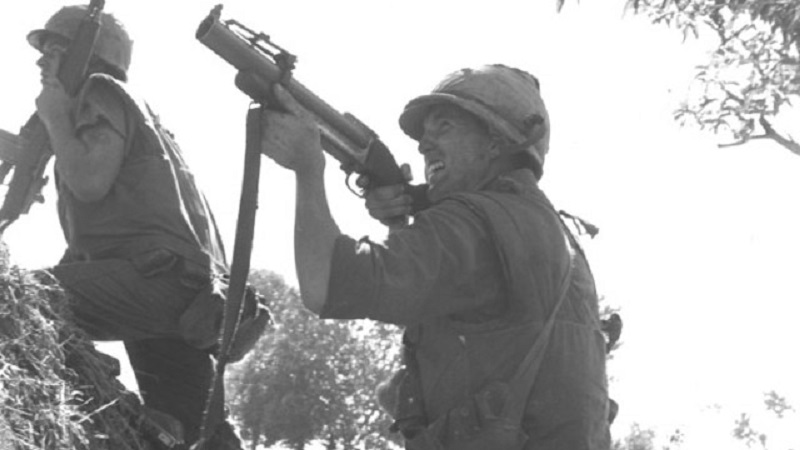
Company F, 2/7th Marines during Operation Utah

Operation Utah was conducted by the 1st Marine Division and three battalions of the ARVN Airborne Division northwest of Quảng Ngãi. The operation resulted in 600 PAVN killed and five captured and 98 Marines and 30 ARVN killed.

7 March

HMM-164 arrived in South Vietnam making the first combat deployment of the CH-46A Sea Knight.

7-23 March

Operation Silver City was conducted by the 1st Brigade, 1st Infantry Division and the 173rd Airborne Brigade in Biên Hòa Province. The operation resulted in 353 PAVN/VC and 11 U.S. killed.

9–10 March

The Battle of A Shau was waged between the PAVN and U.S. and ARVN. The battle began on March 9 and lasted until March 10 with the fall of the special forces camp of the same name. The battle resulted in an estimated 800 PAVN killed, five U.S. missing and 196-288 ARVN killed or missing.

10 March

South Vietnamese Premier Kỳ relieved General Nguyen Chanh Thi as ARVN commander in I Corps in the northern city of Huế. Thi was accused of "siding with the Buddhists" in their long-standing dispute with the South Vietnamese government. Thi was relieved after several days of demonstrations by Buddhists led by Thich Tri Quang and Thich Tam Chau. The Buddhists protested against economic conditions, corruption, and American influence and demanded that President Nguyễn Văn Thiệu and Kỳ resign. The Buddhist Uprising was called the Struggle Movement. U.S. Ambassador in Saigon, Henry Cabot Lodge Jr. did not object to Thi's dismissal.

15 March

I Field Force, Vietnam was activated with its headquarters at Nha Trang. II Field Force, Vietnam was activated with its headquarters at Long Binh Post

18 March

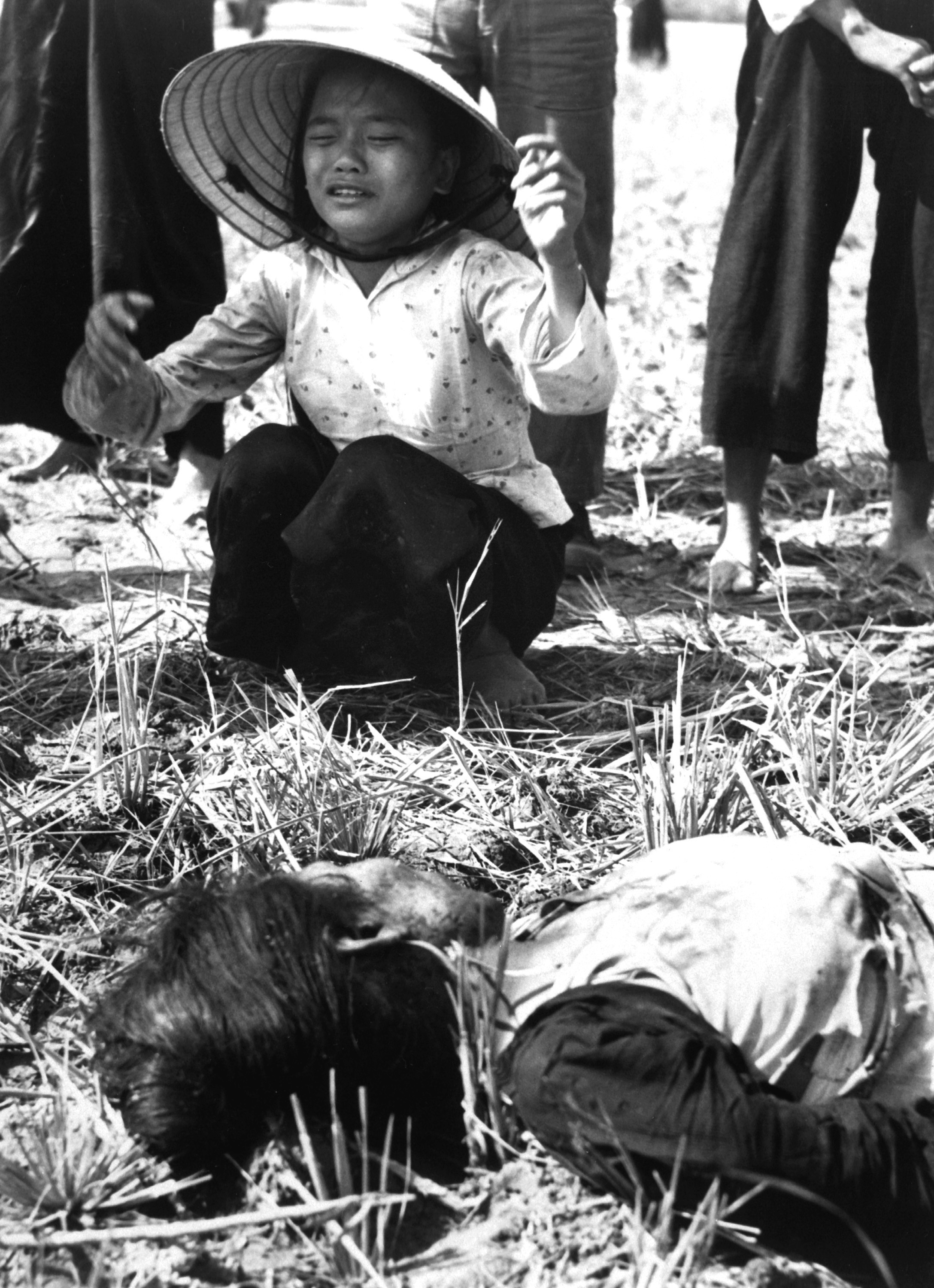
Victims of the 18 March mine explosion

A VC mine explosion killed 15 civilians on a country road 8 km west of Tuy Hòa.

19-23 March

Operation Oregon was conducted by the 1st Marine Division on the Street Without Joy approximately 36 km northwest of Huế. The operation resulted in 48 VC killed and eight captured and 11 Marines killed.

20-4 March

Operation Cuu Long 15 was an ARVN operation in Kien Tuong Province. The operation resulted in 219 VC and three ARVN killed.

20-5 March

Operation Texas was a 1st Marine Division and ARVN 2nd Division and Airborne Division operation northwest of Quảng Ngai. The operation resulted in 283 PAVN/VC and 99 U.S. killed.

20-8 March

Operation Kings was a 1st Marine Division operation 25 km southwest of Da Nang. The operation resulted in 58 VC and six U.S. killed.

21 March

Operation Lê Lợi 15 was an ARVN Special Forces operation in Darlac Province. the operation resulted in 134 VC and 10 ARVN killed.

23-7 March

Operation Maeng Ho V was an ROK Capital Division search and destroy operation in Bình Định Province. the operation resulted in 349 VC and 17 ROK killed.

24-6 March

Operation Dan Chi 211/B was an ARVN operation in Ba Xuyen Province. The operation resulted in 245 VC and 17 ARVN killed.

25 March - 8 April

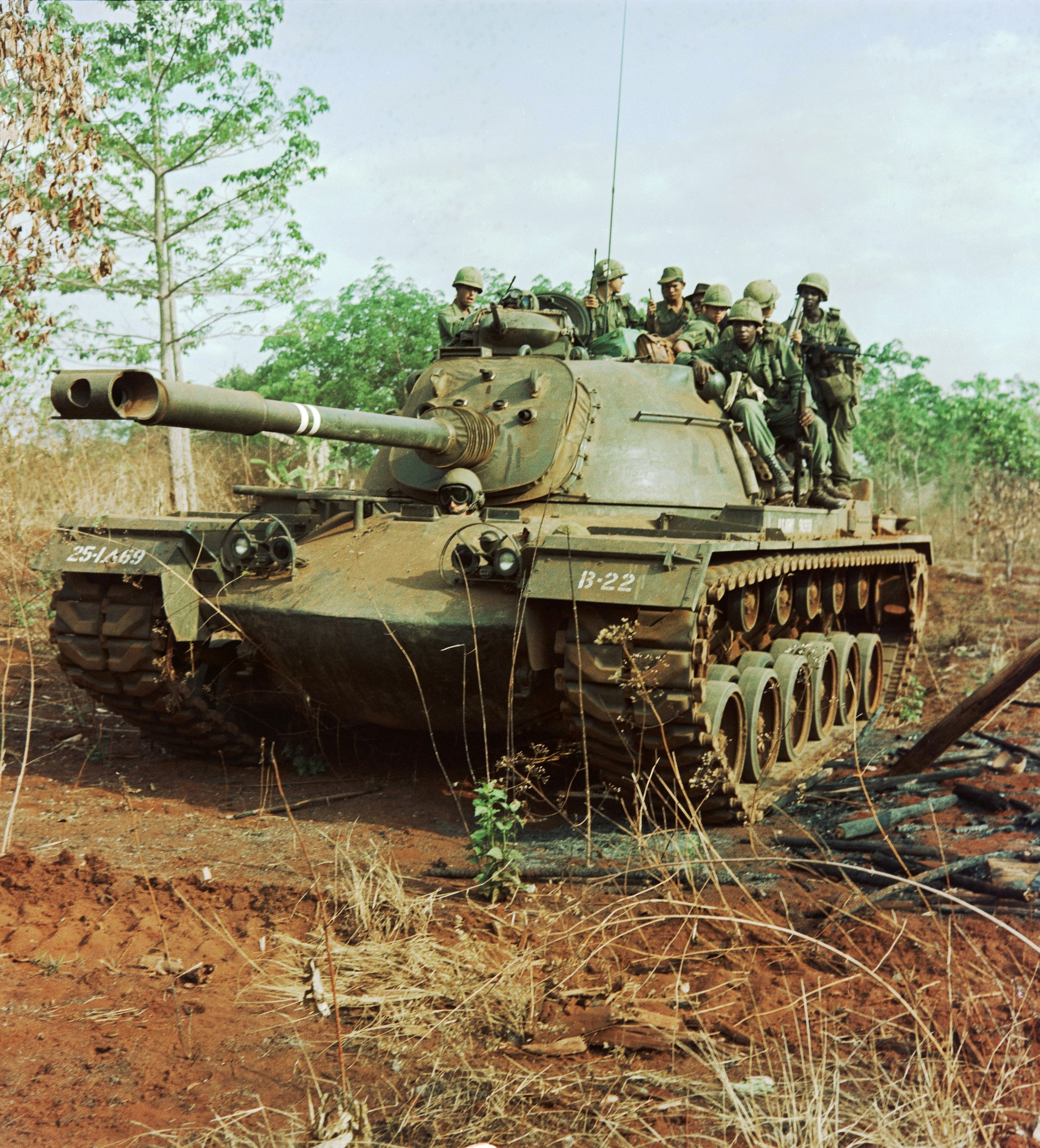
M48A3 tank during Operation Lincoln

Operation Lincoln was a 1st Cavalry Division west of Pleiku to locate suspected PAVN/VC bases and disrupt any planned offensives during the monsoon season. The operation resulted 477 PAVN and 43 U.S. killed.

26 March

Protesters in dozens of American cities demonstrated against the war. In New York 20,000 marched down New York City's Fifth Avenue after a rally in Central Park, while a crowd of 2,000 paraded down State Street in Chicago. Marches also took place in Boston, Washington, San Francisco, Denver, Atlanta, Oklahoma City and Hartford.

26 March - 6 April

Operation Jackstay was a 1st Battalion, 5th Marines and Republic of Vietnam Marine Division operation in the Rung Sat Special Zone. The operation resulted in 63 VC and five U.S. killed.

26 March - 21 July

Operation Fillmore was conducted by the 1st Brigade, 101st Airborne Division in Phú Yên Province. The operation resulted in 134 PAVN and eight U.S. killed.

26 March to 23 September

Operation Su Bok was an ROK Capital Division operation in Bình Định Province. the operation resulted in 299 VC and 23 ROK killed.

28-9 March

Operation Indiana was a 7th Marine Regiment and ARVN operation near Vinh Loc (2) northwest of Quảng Ngai. The operation resulted in 169 VC and 11 Marines killed.

29 March to 5 April

Operation Circle Pines was a U.S. 1st Battalion, 5th Infantry Regiment and ARVN 7th Regiment operation in the Ho Bo Woods, Hậu Nghĩa Province. The operation resulted in 170 VC and 32 U.S./ARVN killed.

30 March

Following several weeks of Buddhist anti-government and anti-American demonstrations in the northern cities of Huế and Da Nang, U.S. Ambassador Lodge and COMUSMACV General Westmoreland advised the South Vietnamese government to take strong action to end the Buddhist Uprising.

31 March

The U.S. Navy relieved Marcus Aurelius Arnheiter of command of USS Vance, his relief begins the so-called "Arnheiter Affair" including a book by Neil Sheehan which Arnheiter attempted to have suppressed.

== April ==
Operation Cuu Long 7 was an ARVN 7th Division search and destroy operation in Kien Tuong Province. The operation resulted in 140 VC and 11 ARVN killed.

Operation Lam Son 255 was an ARVN 1st Division operation in Quảng Tín Province. The operation resulted in 33 VC killed.

Operation Nevada/Operation Lien Ket 34 was a 1st Battalion, 2nd Marines, 2nd Battalion, 7th Marines, ARVN 2nd Division and VNMC search and destroy operation on the Batangan Peninsula, Quảng Ngãi Province. The operation resulted in 68 VC and three ARVN killed.

1 April

General Pham Xuan Chieu, a member of South Vietnam's 10-man military junta who was appearing as an emissary of Prime Minister Kỳ to seek popular support in Da Nang, was surrounded by a mob of 1,000 students and Buddhist activists as he arrived at city government offices. The group then held him captive, transported him around the city in a cycle rickshaw, forced him to make a speech at the local radio station and then released him unharmed.

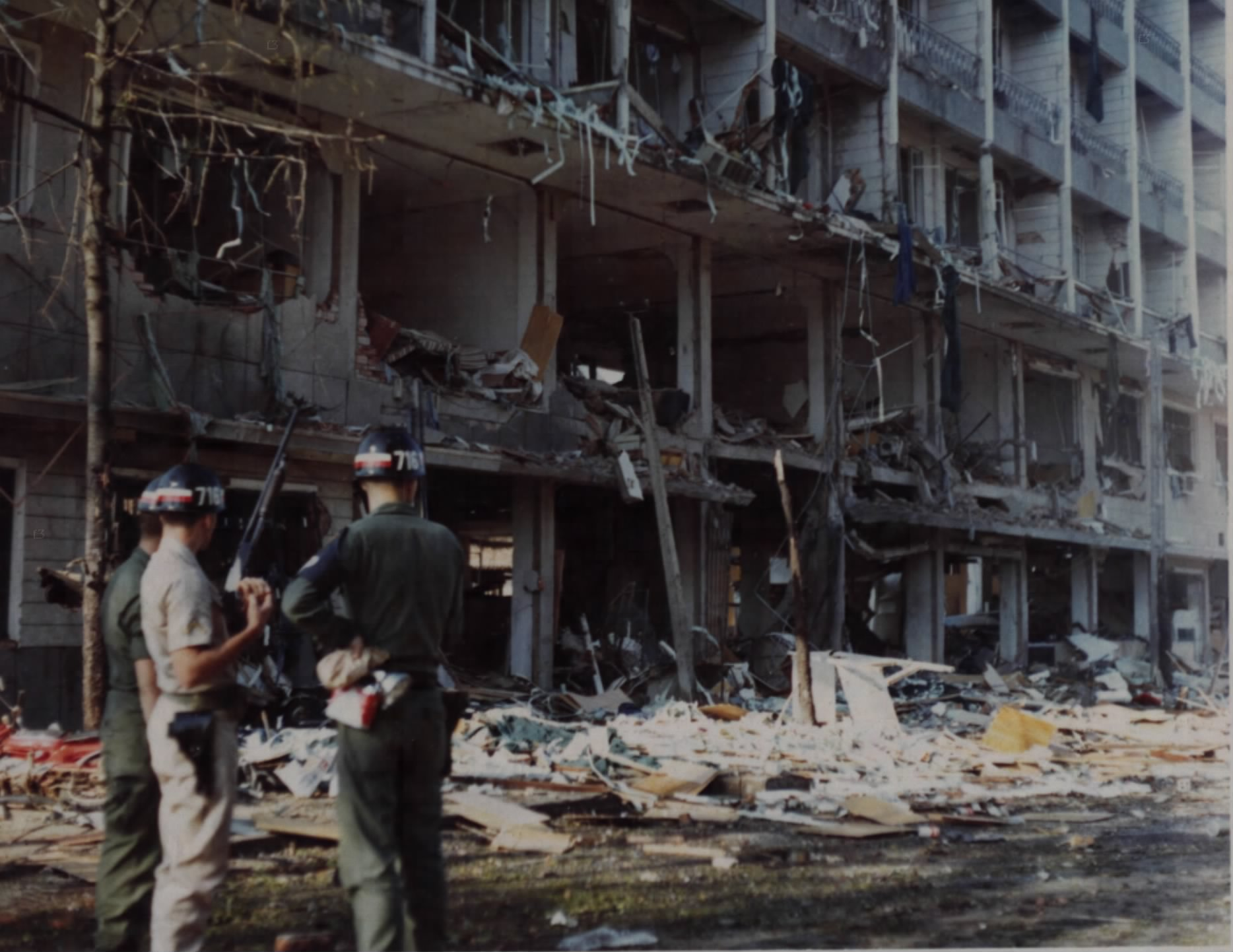
Aftermath of the Victoria BOQ bombing

The VC bombed the Victoria Bachelor Officer's Quarters in Chợ Lớn killing three U.S. servicemen and four South Vietnamese.

1-11 April

Operation Orange was a 1st Battalion, 3rd Marines search and destroy operation near Thường Ðức, 40 km southwest of Da Nang. The operation resulted in 57 VC and 18 Marines killed.

2 April

Ten thousand protesters (including 2,000 South Vietnamese soldiers and sailors in uniform) marched through the streets of Da Nang and denounced both the United States and the Kỳ government. Da Nang Mayor Nguyen Van Man, who had allowed protesters free use of city offices, motor vehicles and printing facilities, was accused of treason by Kỳ, who said that he planned to have Man executed by a firing squad.

2-13 April

Operation Bun Kae 66-5 was an ROK Capital Division operation in Bình Định Province. the operation resulted in 292 VC and 23 ROK killed.

4 April

Kỳ sent five battalions of ARVN Rangers and South Vietnamese marines to Da Nang to quell the Buddhist uprising. The U.S. transported the soldiers and marines. Westmoreland ordered all American soldiers in Da Nang be confined to their billets.

5 April

Kỳ personally attempted to lead the capture of the restive city of Da Nang before backing down.

6-8 April

Operation Kahuku was a U.S. 1st Battalion, 5th Infantry Regiment and ARVN 49th Regiment search and destroy operation west of Cu Chi. The operation resulted in 26 killed.

9 April

A platoon of U.S. Marines blocked the passage of a convoy of pro-Buddhist ARVN soldiers en route to take over Da Nang Air Base. The armed confrontation was resolved after negotiations between the two sides. Over the next few days the tense situation in Da Nang and Huế quieted down, although control of the two cities was still contested between the government and the Buddhists.

The Buddhist uprising causes debate within the Johnson Administration with George Ball recommending a halt to further troop deployments and a scaling back of operations and bombing of the North, while other advisers recommend continuing the current incremental approach.

The USAF announced a new policy that flight crews will be rotated out of the combat zone after the earlier of 12 months or 100 combat missions.

11 April

The conservative newsweekly U.S. News & World Report became the first American news magazine to characterize the Vietnam War as a "stalemate" with neither side likely to defeat the other.

11 - 12 April

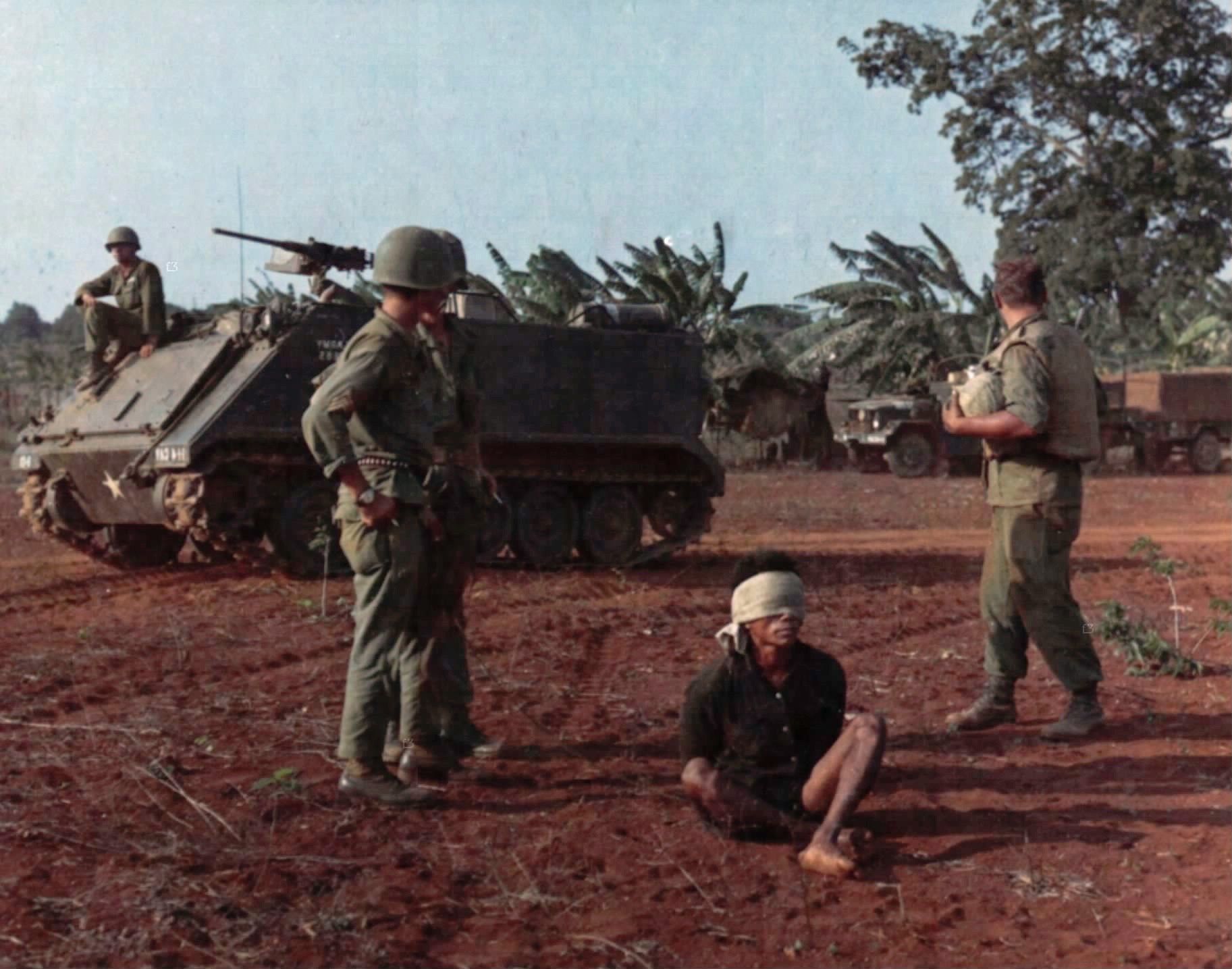
ARVN with a captured VC, Operation Abilene

The Battle of Xa Cam My was fought over two days. Originally planned as a U.S. search and destroy mission intended to lure out the "crack" VC D800 Battalion in the rubber plantations of Xa Cam My, approximately 42 miles (68 km) east of Saigon. During this battle, 134 men of Charlie Company, 2nd Battalion, 16th Infantry, 1st Infantry Division were ambushed by the VC. The battle resulted in 41 VC and 36 U.S. killed.

12 April

For the first time, North Vietnam was bombed by American B-52 Stratofortress bombers when 29 B-52s dropped 585 tons of bombs on the Mụ Giạ Pass through the Annamese Mountain Range, in an attempt to break the supply line that was nicknamed the "Ho Chi Minh trail". Although the objective was to create landslides that would close off the pass completely, a reconnaissance mission the next day found that the North Vietnamese had cleared the area, filled the craters in the road, and were driving their trucks through the pass once more. After a second wave of intensive bombings and an equally intensive clearing of the pass, a Central Intelligence Agency (CIA) appraisal would later note that the "Communists will spare no effort to keep it open".

The PRC claimed to have shot down a U.S. aircraft over the Leizhou Peninsula. The aircraft was identified as being an KA-3B Skywarrior of VAH-4 en route from Naval Air Station Cubi Point to the USS Kitty Hawk with four crewmen on board.

13-4 April

Operation Kalamazoo was a 1st Battalion, 5th Infantry Regiment operation in the Ho Bo Woods northwest of Cu Chi. the operation resulted in 26 VC and seven U.S. killed.

14 April

General Thiệu signed a decree promising that free national elections for a civilian government would take place by 15 September.

A VC mortar attack on Tan Son Nhut Air Base destroyed 2 RVNAF aircraft and killed seven USAF and two RVNAF personnel.

14-6 April

Operation Quyet Thang 184 was an ARVN 2nd Division operation in Quảng Ngãi Province. The operation resulted in 206 VC and 11 ARVN killed.

15 April

Lieutenant General Tôn Thất Đính arrived in Huế and took over as commander of I Corps after General Chuan asked for the marines to be withdrawn from Da Nang, prompting the ten-man junta to unanimously removed him; Chuan also voted for his own ouster. Kỳ felt that Đính's aggressive attitude following the Xá Lợi Pagoda raids staged under the Diệm regime in 1963 indicated a willingness to suppress Buddhist dissidents.

A U.S. military spokesman reported that there had already been 1,361 U.S. servicemen killed in the war as of 9 April, more than the 1,342 that had died during the entire year of 1965. By April, according to the press release, the combat death rate for U.S. Army, Marine, Navy and Air Force personnel was now averaging 100 people per week.

16 April

The VC R-20 Doc Lap Battalion attacked the Company H, 2nd Battalion, 9th Marines position at Phong Thu southeast of Hill 55. The Marines repelled the attack with artillery and air support. 12 VC dead were found in the morning, but a further 63 were estimated to have been killed, Marines losses were seven killed.

16-21 April

Operation Kahala was a 2nd Brigade, 25th Infantry Division search and destroy operation in Hậu Nghĩa Province. The operation resulted in 55 VC and three U.S. killed.

18 April

The first successful launch of an AGM-45 Shrike anti-radiation missile against an SA-2's Fan Song radar was conducted by an F-100F Wild Weasel.

19 April

Clashes erupted in Quảng Ngãi between the Buddhists and the Việt Nam Quốc Dân Đảng (VNQDĐ, Vietnamese Nationalist Party), who supported the continuation of the anti-communist war, prompting Đính to forcibly restrain the two groups.

21 April

In a speech at Johns Hopkins University, Senator Fulbright was sharply critical of the war, stating that the United States was "in danger of losing its perspective on what exactly is within the realm of its power and what is beyond it." Warning of what he called "the arrogance of power," Fulbright declared "we are not living up to our capacity and promise as a civilized power for the world." He called the war a betrayal of American values.

21-5 April

Operation Dan Chi 219C was an ARVN 21st Division operation in Chuong Thien Province. The operation resulted in 247 VC and 20 ARVN killed.

21 April - 10 May

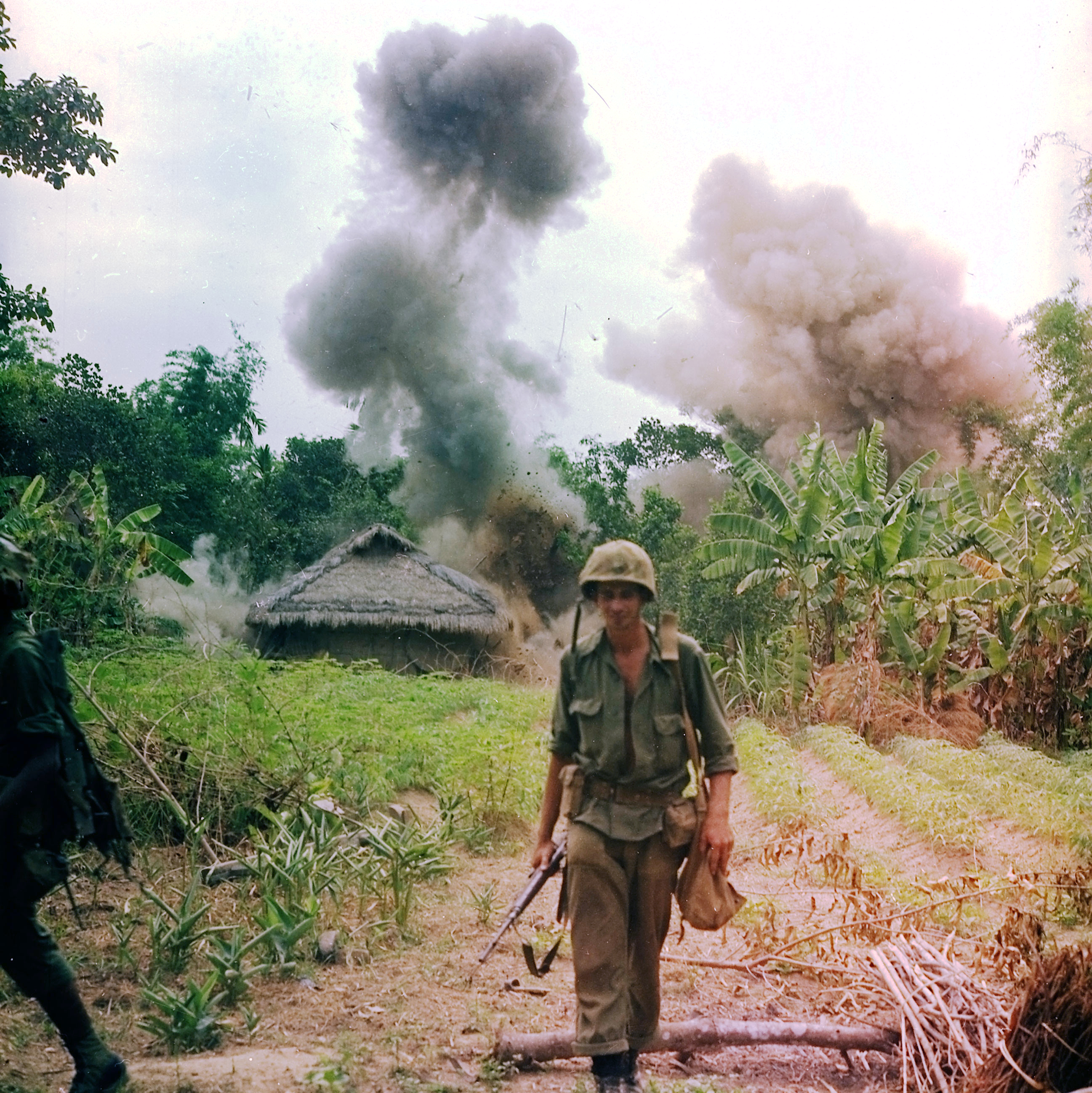
Marines destroy VC huts during Operation Georgia

Operation Georgia was a 3rd Battalion, 9th Marines security operation around the An Hoa Industrial Complex in western Quảng Nam Province. The operation resulted in 103 VC and nine Marines killed.

22-4 April

Operation Hot Springs/Operation Lien Ket 36 was a 3rd Battalion, 1st Marines, 2nd Battalion, 7th Marines, 3rd Battalion, 7th Marines and ARVN 5th Regiment, 2nd Division, VNMC 1st Battalion and 5th Airborne Battalion operation in Quảng Ngãi Province. The operation resulted in 103 VC and eight ARVN killed.

23 April

The Vietnam People's Air Force (VPAF) sent its first MiG-21 to intercept two B-66 Destroyers being escorted to their mission by a flight of F-4 Phantoms. Neither side scored a kill in the engagement.

24 April - 17 May

Operation Birmingham was conducted by the U.S. 1st Infantry Division and the ARVN 5th Division on the eastern flank of War Zone C, north of Saigon. The goals were opening Route 13 from Saigon to the north and engaging the VC 9th Division. The VC lost 100 killed, but managed to withdraw beyond the Cambodian border, U.S. losses were 45 killed and wounded.

26 April

In Operation County Fair 11 two companies of the ARVN 3rd Battalion, 51st Regiment surprised a VC unit in Thanh Quit (3) south of Da Nang, killing 45 VC and capturing 17 for the loss of one dead.

A USAF F-4C from the 480th Tactical Fighter Squadron scored the first MiG-21 kill of the war, shooting down the MiG with an AIM-9 missile.

29 April

The total number of U.S. troops in South Vietnam reached 250,000, as 4,000 members of the U.S. 25th Infantry Division came ashore at Vũng Tàu.

== May ==
Operation Khung Long was an ARVN operation in Bình Định Province. The operation resulted in 30 VC and 19 ARVN killed.

Operation Xay Dung 31 was an ARVN operation in Bình Long Province. The operation resulted in 33 VC and 29 ARVN killed.

1 May

The U.S. attacked Cambodia, after a U.S. patrol came under mortar fire in Tây Ninh Province along South Vietnam's border with the neutral nation. When it was determined that the shelling was coming from the other side of the Cai Bac River that separated the two nations, the 2nd Infantry Regiment invoked the right of self-defense within the rules of engagement and fired shells across the river into a VC position on the other side.

1-16 May

Operation Davy Crockett was conducted by the 3rd Brigade, 1st Cavalry Division near Bong Son. The operation resulted in 345 PAVN and 28 U.S. killed.

1-18 May

Operation Austin IV was a search and destroy operation conducted by the 1st Brigade, 101st Airborne Division and the 173rd Airborne Brigade in western Quang Duc and Phước Long Provinces. The operation resulted in 101 PAVN killed and six captured. U.S. losses were nine killed.

3 May

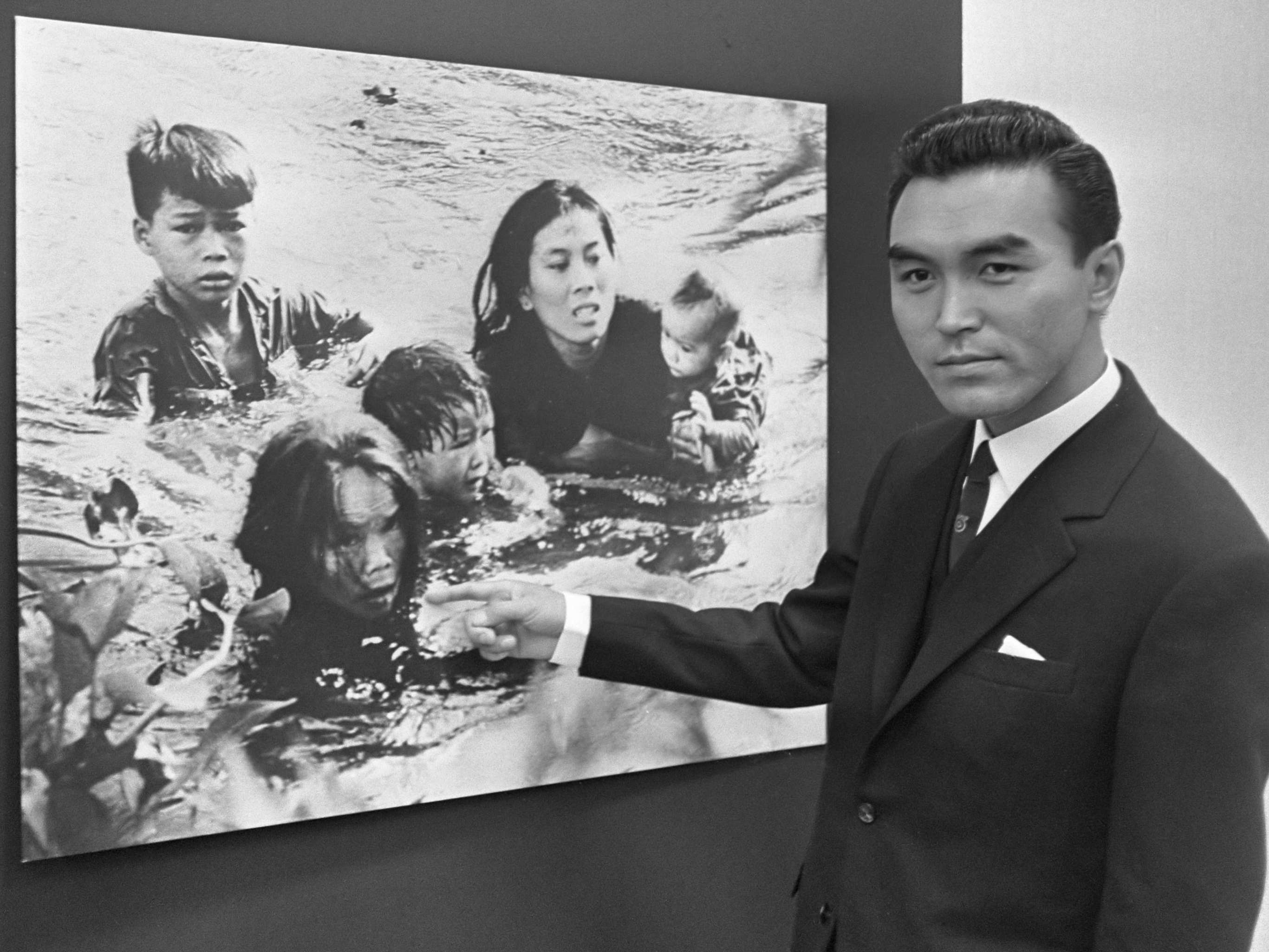
Kyōichi Sawada with his photo "Flight to safety"

United Press International photographer Kyōichi Sawada won the Pulitzer Prize for Photography for his photo "Flight to safety".

4 May

A U.S. Army CH-47A Chinook helicopter crashed near Di Linh, Lâm Đồng Province killing all 20 on board.

6 May

Kỳ told Westmoreland that the Buddhist Struggle Movement virtually controlled the three northern provinces of South Vietnam and that the Buddhist leaders were suspected of being in contact with the VC.

Kỳ backtracked on the April promise to hold free elections for a civilian government by September, announcing instead that the late September voting would be limited to an assembly that would draft a new constitution. Upon completion of that document, an election for a national legislature would be scheduled, and that legislature would then appoint a civilian government. Until then, Kỳ told reporters in Cần Thơ, the military regime would stay in power "for at least another year".

10 May - 1 August

Operation Paul Revere was a 3rd Brigade, 25th Infantry Division sweep operation that took place west of Pleiku. The operation resulted in 546 PAVN killed and 68 captured and 66 U.S. killed.

13 May

Radio Peking claimed that five American fighter planes had crossed from North Vietnam and into Chinese airspace, and that the fighters used guided missiles to shoot down a People's Liberation Army Air Force plane over Maguan in Yunnan province, and a spokesman called it an "act of war provocation". Hours later, the United States denied the story, but said that one of its F-4C Phantoms had downed a MiG-17 in North Vietnam, about 25 miles (40 km) from the border.

14 May

Across the U.S., more than 400,000 college students took the draft deferment examination, given at 1,200 colleges and universities, in order to be exempted from being drafted into the United States military during the war, while anti-war demonstrations took place outside many of the testing centers. Students were allowed three hours to answer 150 questions in order to see whether they could retain their 2-S draft classification; out of 1.8 million students who were 2-S, one million had registered for the test, which would be repeated on 21 May, 3 June and 24 June and the test score and class rank would be evaluated by local draft boards.

Former Commandant of the Marine Corps David M. Shoup gave a speech criticizing U.S. intervention overseas. He would become arguably the most vocal former military member to oppose the war.

14-6 May

Operation Dan Chi 227 was an ARVN operation in An Xuyen Province. The operation resulted in 247 VC and one ARVN killed.

15 May

On Premier Kỳ's orders, without notifying President Thiệu or the U.S., a pro-government military force arrived in Da Nang to take control of the city from the Buddhist Struggle movement protesting against the government and American influence. Over 1,000 ARVN troops were airlifted from Saigon and recaptured most of the city after a day-long battle.

15-25 May

In the Second Battle of Nakhang RLA forces recaptured Na Khang from the PAVN/Pathet Lao.

16-30 May

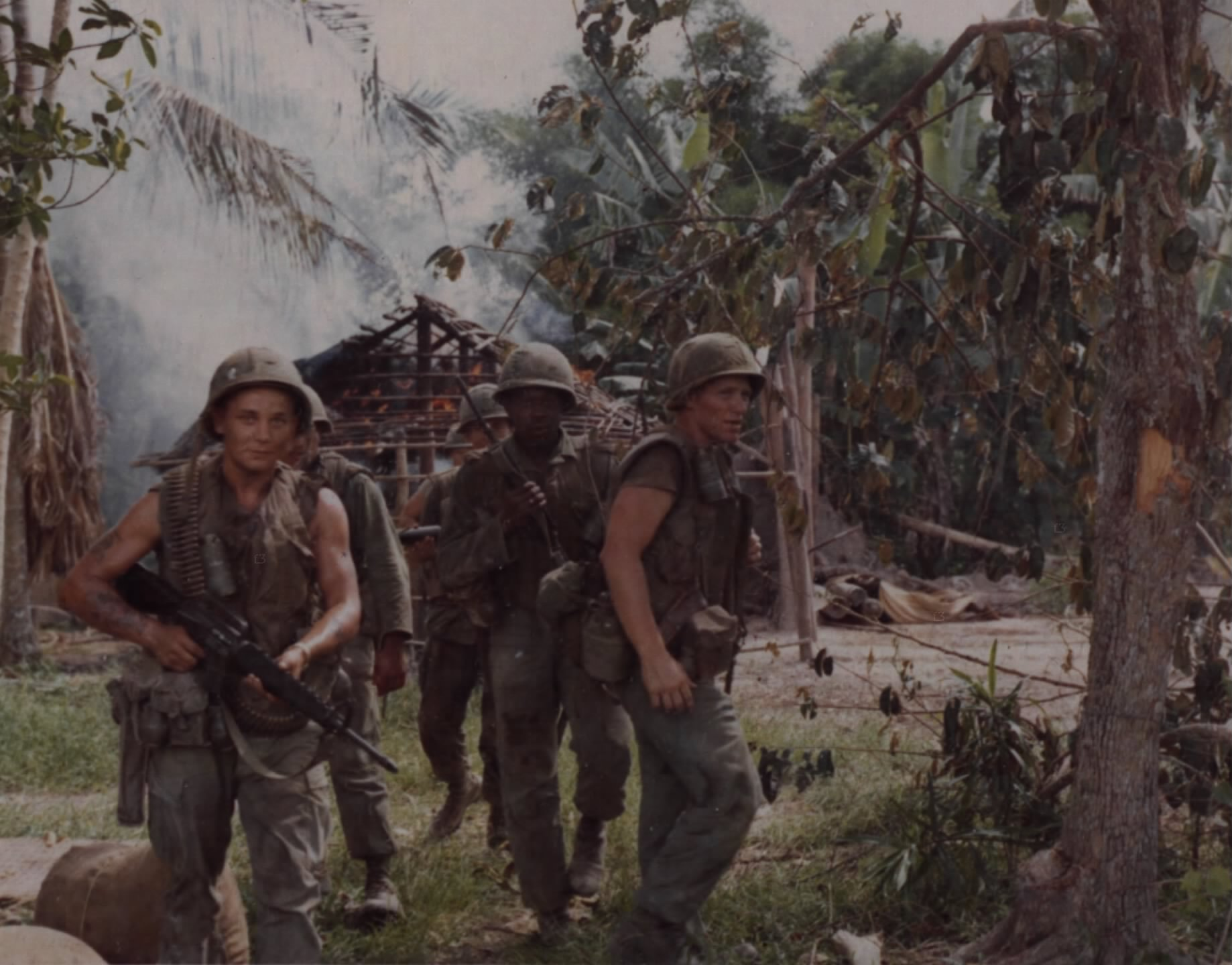
B Company, 2nd Battalion, 14th Infantry, search for VC during Operation Wahiawa

Operation Wahiawa was an operation conducted by the U.S. 25th Infantry Division in Hậu Nghĩa Province. The operation resulted in 157 VC killed.

16 May - 5 June

Operation Crazy Horse was a search and destroy mission conducted by the 1st Brigade, 1st Cavalry Division, ARVN and ROK forces. The operation resulted in 478 VC killed, 79 U.S. killed and one missing, 8 ARVN and 14 Koreans killed.

16 May - 8 June

Operation Hardihood was a security operation conducted by the U.S. 503rd Infantry Regiment, 1 RAR and the 5th Battalion, Royal Australian Regiment (5 RAR) in Phước Tuy Province to secure the area around Nui Dat for the establishment of a base area for the 1st Australian Task Force (1 ATF). The operation resulted in 48 VC, 23 U.S. and five Australians killed.

17 May

An American gunner on a helicopter fired on a menacing crowd at the airport in Huế and killed an ARVN officer. The Buddhist Struggle movement blamed the incident on the American.

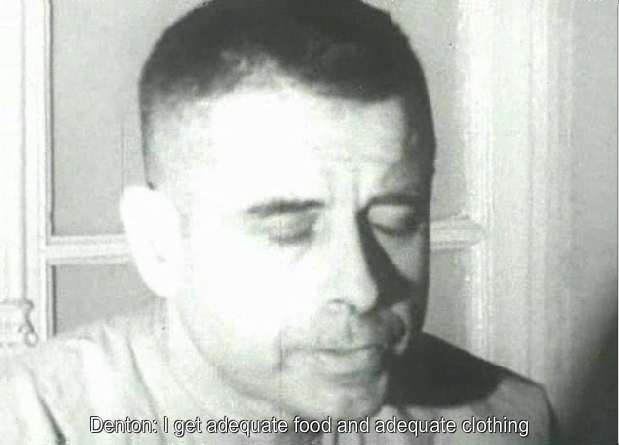
Jeremiah Denton blinks Torture in Morse Code

In an interview with Japanese television, U.S. Navy Commander Jeremiah Denton used Morse code to blink the word torture, alerting the U.S. military to the mistreatment of prisoners of war in North Vietnam. Denton was captured on 18 July 1965 when his A-6A Intruder was shot down near the Thanh Hóa Bridge and he was held as a prisoner of war until 12 February 1973.

1st Logistical Command assumed responsibility for logistics support in II, III and IV Corps from the Navy's Headquarters Support Activity, Saigon (HSAS). HSAS was inactivated that day and replaced by Naval Support Activity Saigon.

Operation Dan Chi 228B was an ARVN operation in Bạc Liêu Province. The operation resulted in 267 VC and six ARVN killed.

18 May

U.S. Marines faced off against pro-Buddhist ARVN soldiers at a bridge near Da Nang. A few shots were exchanged and the ARVN soldiers attempted to blow up the bridge. General Lewis William Walt, the commander of the U.S. Marines in South Vietnam, was present and directed the Marines to secure the bridge.

19 May

The PAVN attacked the ARVN 1st Division Firebase Gio Linh killing 43 and wounding 54.

19 May - 13 July

Operation El Paso was conducted by the U.S. 1st Infantry Division and ARVN 5th Division in Bình Long Province. The operation resulted in 825 VC killed with a further 1,249 estimated killed and 125 U.S. killed.

21-3 May

Operation Long Phi 971 was an ARVN operation in Kiên Giang Province. The operation resulted in 224 VC and six ARVN killed.

22 May

The VC killed 18 sleeping men, a woman and four children during an attack on a housing center for canal workers in An Giang Province.

24 May

The government of South Vietnam regained full control of Da Nang from the pro-Buddhist Struggle Movement. In the fighting, approximately 150 South Vietnamese soldiers were killed. 23 Americans were wounded.

Errol Noack, a 21 year old Australian Army Private in 5 RAR, became the first Australian National Service draftee to be killed in the war, only ten days after he had arrived, and would become a symbol for the Australian anti-war movement. Private Noack was the victim of friendly fire, shot by members of another platoon of 5 RAR during Operation Hardihood after being mistaken for an enemy combatant.

25 May

The Cultural Revolution begins in China starting a period of prolonged political instability within one of North Vietnam's major allies.

26 May

A large pro-Buddhist crowd attended the funeral of the rebel ARVN lieutenant who was killed by a US soldier after shooting at General Cao's departing helicopter. Afterward, the protestors rioted and burned down the US Information Service Library in Huế. Over the next week, three Buddhist clergy self-immolated in protest at US policies. The Buddhist activist leader Thích Trí Quang, went on a hunger strike, denouncing American support for the Kỳ-Thiệu junta, which he viewed as inappropriate interference in domestic affairs.

In the annual U.S. presidential proclamation of the last Monday in May as Memorial Day, President Johnson pledged that the United States would not pull out of the war until victory had been achieved. "This nation has never left the field of battle in abject surrender of a cause for which it has fought", Johnson wrote. "We shall not do so now. We shall see this through."

MACV announced that the number of American casualties in Vietnam in the week of May 15–21 marked the highest up to that time in the war, with 146 Americans killed and 820 wounded. The 966 casualties was 36% higher than the previous record of 710 in the week of November 14–20, 1965, when 86 were killed and 565 wounded.

30 May

Operation Quyet Thang 296 was an ARVN operation in Quảng Tín Province. The operation resulted in 100 VC and two ARVN killed.

== June ==
1 June

A crowd of pro-Buddhist demonstrators stormed the U.S. Consulate in Huế and set it on fire.

2-5 June

Operation Lam Son II was a military and public relations operation in the village of Tân Phước Khánh, Tân Uyên District.

2-21 June

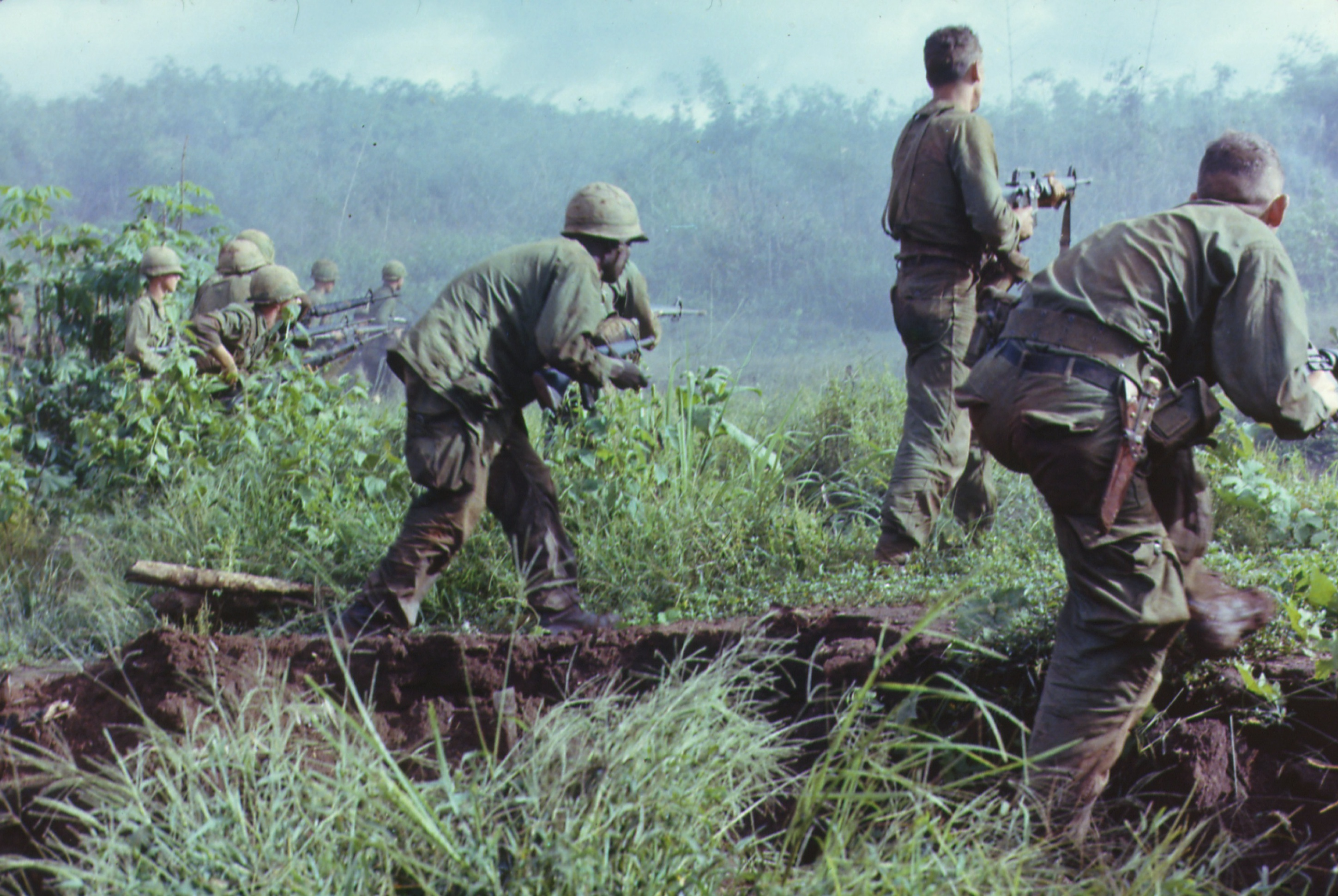
101st Airborne troops engage PAVN during Operation Hawthorne

Operation Hawthorne was conducted by the 101st Airborne Division to relieve the ARVN 42nd Regiment, 22nd Division under siege at Toumorong northeast of Đắk Tô. On 9 June Captain Bill Carpenter commanding C Company, 2nd Battalion, 502nd Parachute Infantry Regiment called in a napalm strike on his own position as it was being overrun by PAVN. The operation resulted in 688 PAVN killed and 21 captured and a further 506 estimated killed and 48 U.S. and 10 ARVN killed.

4 June

The Senate of the Philippines voted, 15–8, to authorize President Ferdinand Marcos to send 2,000 soldiers to South Vietnam. With that action, became the fourth nation to join the United States in entering the war, along with South Korea, Australia and New Zealand.

5 June

The Sunday Times published The General Goes Zapping Charlie Cong, a New Journalism story by Nicholas Tomalin, detailing a day's activities of General James F. Hollingsworth during the war.

7-12 June

Operation Thang Phong III was an ARVN and CIDG operation in Pleiku Province. The operation resulted in 135 VC and 20 ARVN/CIDG killed.

9 June

The Associated Press reported General Ben Sternberg, commander of the 101st Airborne Division saying that the U.S. would need 500,000 more troops to seal off the borders of South Vietnam from infiltration, that Kỳ would probably have to step aside given the repercussions of the Buddhist Uprising and that a U.S. defeat in Vietnam was a possibility.

16-6 June

The Battle of Hill 488 took place in Hiệp Đức District when the U.S. Marines 1st Reconnaissance Battalion engaged a PAVN/VC force. The battle resulted in 42-200 PAVN/VC and 14 Marines killed.

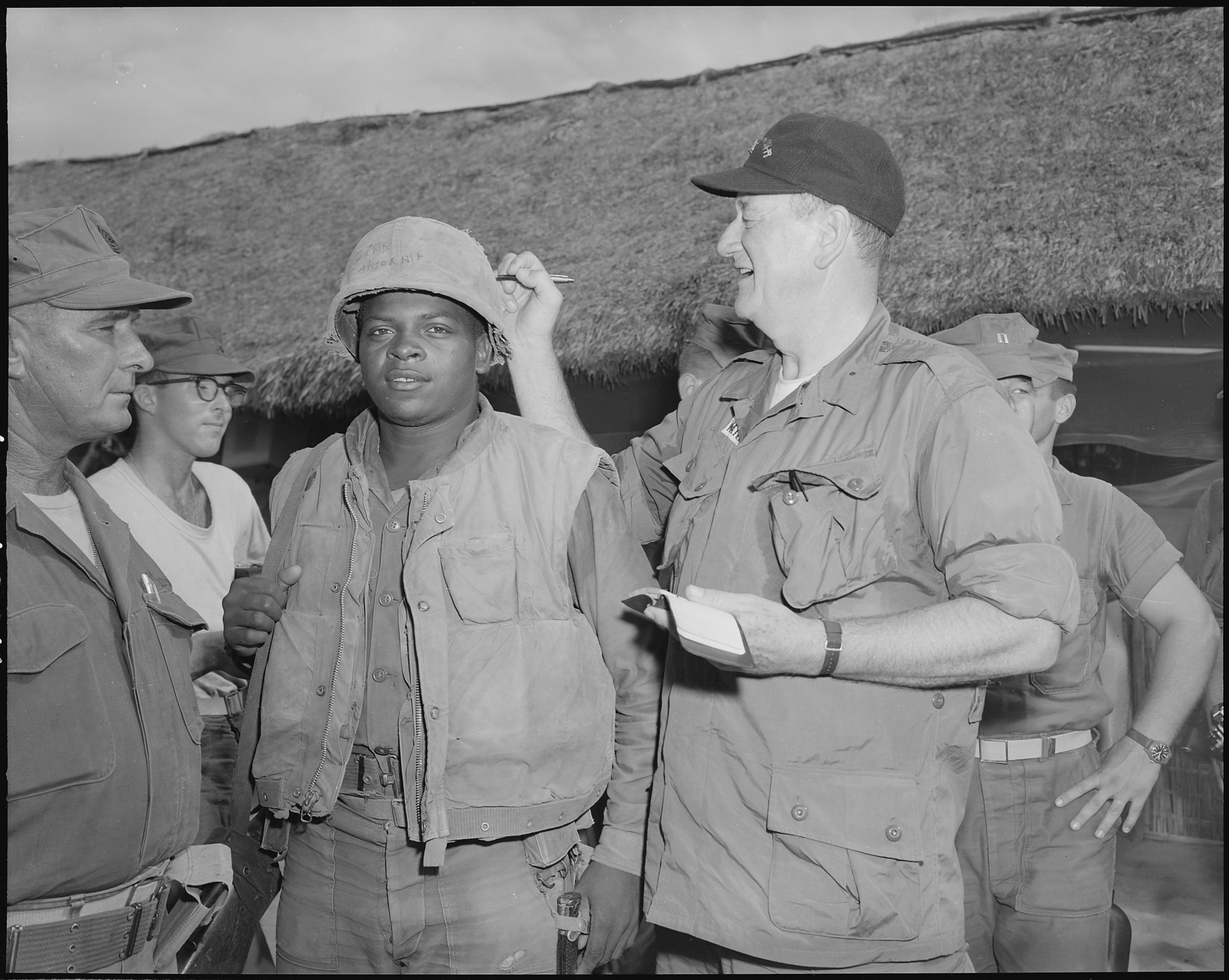
John Wayne signs a Marine's helmet during a visit to Chu Lai Base Area

17 June

General Võ Nguyên Giáp is featured on the cover of Time magazine.

19-30 June

Operation Nathan Hale was conducted by the 1st Cavalry Division west of Phú Yên Province. the operation resulted in 450 PAVN killed and a further 300 estimated killed.

21-4 June

Operation Lam Son 283 was an ARVN 1st Division operation in Quảng Trị Province. The operation resulted in 331 PAVN/VC and 37 ARVN killed.

22 June

Thích Trí Quang was arrested and taken to a local military hospital, before being taken to Saigon and permanently put under house arrest.

23 June

After several days of fighting with protesting Buddhists, the South Vietnamese government regained full control of the city of Huế. The lesson learned in the Buddhist Uprising was that "the dominance of Generals Ky and Thieu could not be contested as long as they had the support of the United States." More than three years of internecine strife in South Vietnam between Buddhists and Catholics and between competing military factions effectively ended.

25 June to 1 July

Operation Coco Palms was a 1st Battalion, 5th Infantry Regiment search and destroy operation northwest of Cu Chi. The operation resulted in 25 VC killed.

25 June - 3 July

Operation Jay was a U.S. 4th Marine Regiment and ARVN 1st Division search and destroy operation on the Street Without Joy. The operation resulted in 475 PAVN and 24 Marines killed.

29 June

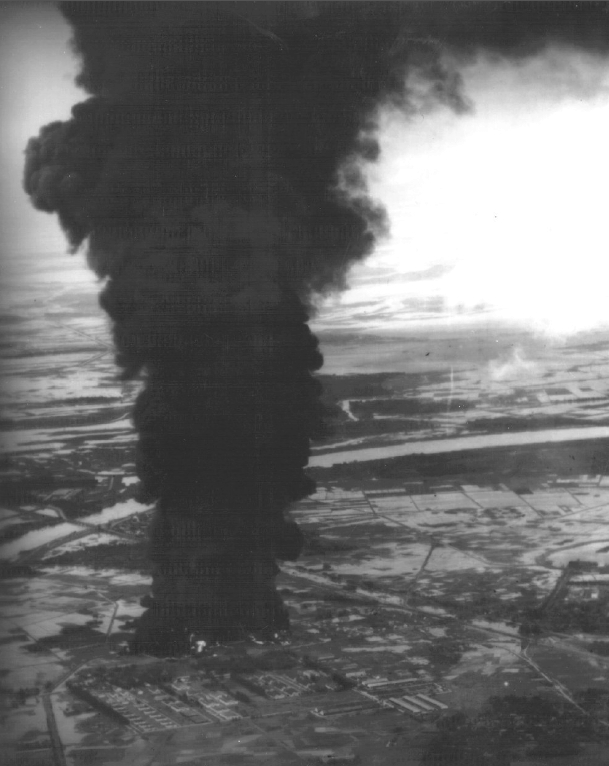
Hanoi fuel storage tanks on fire

Sixteen U.S. Navy A-6 Intruders and 12 support aircraft took off from the aircraft carriers USS Constellation and USS Ranger to carry out the first American bombing of North Vietnam's largest cities, striking at fuel and oil facilities near Haiphong, the nation's second biggest city. Twenty-five minutes later 25 USAF F-105 Thunderchief fighter-bombers attacked fuel storage tanks in Hanoi. However, a CIA report two months later would conclude that the daring raids had escalated the war, but failed to have the expected impact, noting "there is no evidence that the air strikes have significantly weakened popular morale."

30 June

The Fort Hood Three, three soldiers in the 142nd Signal Company, 2nd Armored Division stationed at Fort Hood, Texas refused to be sent to South Vietnam, stating that the war was illegal and immoral. All three were court-martialed and sentenced to three years' hard labor.

== July ==
1 July

The North Vietnamese government orders the evacuation of all non-essential persons from Hanoi.

3 July

Thirty-one people were arrested when a demonstration by approximately 4,000 antiwar protesters in front of the U.S. Embassy in London's Grosvenor Square turned violent.

4 July - 28 October

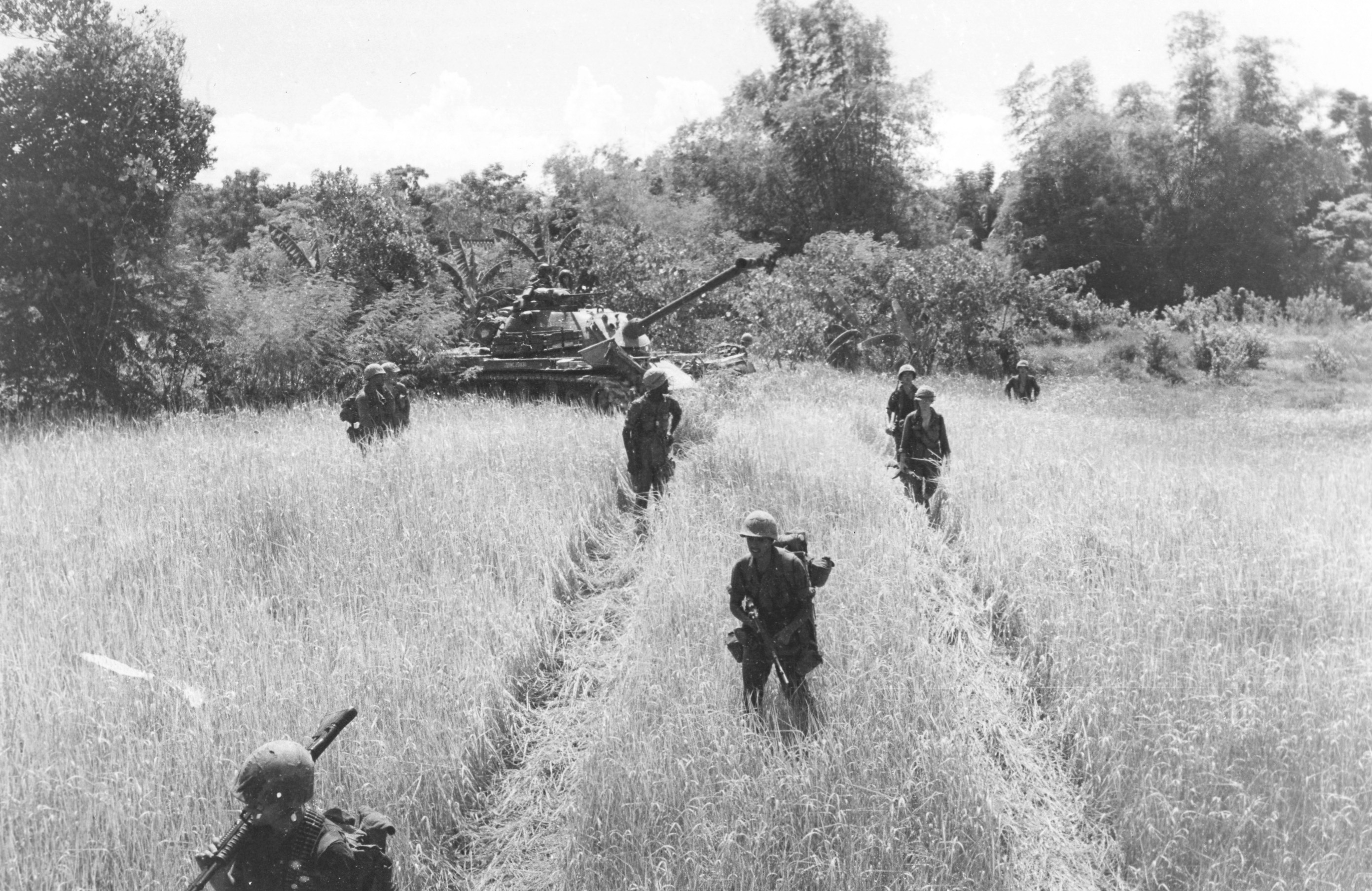
1/3 Marines patrol during Operation Macon

Operation Macon was a 1st Marine Division operation around the An Hoa Combat Base. The operation resulted in 380 VC and 24 Marines killed.

5 July

Operation Cuu Long 32/66 was an ARVN operation in Kien Hoa Province. The operation resulted in 155 VC and four ARVN killed.

5-11 July

Operation Binh Phu was an ARVN operation in Bình Định Province. The operation resulted in 137 VC and 15 ARVN killed.

6 July

The Hanoi March was conducted, with 52 U.S. prisoners of war (POWs) forced to walk for 2 miles (3.2 km) through the streets of Hanoi to be shown off before tens of thousands of North Vietnamese civilians. The action came in the wake of the bombing raids near Hanoi a week earlier. The POWs were chained in pairs, and were paraded along Tràng Tiền Street, and then along Hàng Bông and Nguyễn Thái Học streets in front of an increasingly angry mob. Over the next hour, many of the men were beaten by civilians as the planned event went out of control before the group finally reached the relative safety of the Hàng Đây Stadium, before being returned to their prison camps.

7 July

Air-to-air missiles were used in combat for the first time by the VPAF as two MiG-21 jets fired on USAF F-105 fighters.

The Warsaw Pact conference in Bucharest ended with a joint declaration by the European Communist nations to send volunteers to North Vietnam if requested for such support by the North Vietnamese government. The members making the pledge were the Soviet Union, Bulgaria, Czechoslovakia, East Germany, Hungary, Poland and Romania.

The U.S. Department of Defense declared a new policy, to take effect immediately, of a hardship discharge from American military service for any men "who become qualified sole surviving sons subsequent to their enlistment or induction", but only if the applicant's brother or father had been in the military and had died "as a result of hazards incident to their service in the armed forces".

8-12 July

Operation Thăng Long 243 was an ARVN operation in Darlac Province. The operation resulted in 107 VC and 17 ARVN killed.

9 July

The Battle of Minh Thanh Road occurred when a VC force attacked a U.S. 1st infantry Division convoy, triggering a prepared U.S. ambush, resulting in 238 VC and 25 U.S. killed.

9 July to August

Operation Bun Kae 66-9 was an ROK Capital Division operation in Pleiku Province. The operation resulted in 106 VC and seven ROK killed.

15 July - 3 August

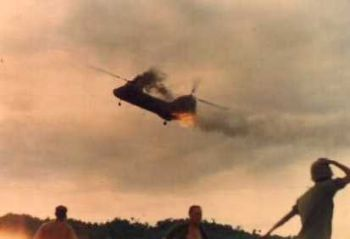
A Marine CH-46 is shot down during Operation Hastings

Operation Hastings was conducted by the 3rd Marine Division and ARVN 1st Division to push the PAVN 324B Division back across the DMZ. The operation resulted in 700+ PAVN killed and 17 captured and 126 Marines and 21 ARVN killed.

16 July

British Prime Minister Harold Wilson flew to Moscow to try to persuade the Soviets to start peace negotiations between the United States and North Vietnam about the war. Despite a warm welcome from Soviet Premier Alexei Kosygin, Wilson was told simply that his peace bid was doomed to fail. Wilson arrived only two hours after the departure of India's Prime Minister Indira Gandhi, who had been on a similar peace initiative.

17 July

As the war escalated, North Vietnam's President Ho Chi Minh ordered a partial mobilization of the PAVN to "extend all-out support" to the VC forces. Ho said: "This war may go on for five more years, ten more years, 20 more years, or even more. Hanoi, Haiphong and a number of our other cities and enterprises may be destroyed, but the people of Vietnam are not afraid. There is nothing more precious than independence and freedom."

Operation Lam Son 290 was an ARVN 1st Division operation in Quảng Trị Province. The operation resulted in 135 PAVN/VC killed.

18 July - 14 January 1968

The Battle of Nam Bac took place in the Nam bac valley in Laos between RLA and the PAVN and Pathet Lao. After initially occupying the area against light resistance, by early 1967 the RLA forces were besieged by the PAVN and Pathet Lao in a battle of attrition. On 13 January 1968 the RLA forces disintegrated and the PAVN 316th Division overran the area capturing over 2,400 RLA soldiers.

20 July

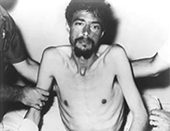
Dieter Dengler after being rescued

Lieutenant (j.g.) Dieter Dengler, a U.S. Navy pilot, became the second and last American to successfully escape from a POW camp during the war, when he was rescued 23 days after escaping a camp in Laos.

21 July - 5 September

Operation John Paul Jones was conducted by the 1st Brigade, 101st Airborne Division in Phú Yên Province. The operation resulted in 209 VC and 23 U.S. killed.

22 July

A million people gathered in Tiananmen Square in Beijing for a rally in support of defending North Vietnam, and to listen to speeches by Communist Party leaders. President Liu Shaoqi told the crowd, "We must warn the United States Aggressors in all seriousness— don't miscalculate, don't misjudge your opponents.... If you think you can unscrupulously 'escalate' the war of aggression without meeting due punishment, then you will find it too late to repent. The 700,000,000 Chinese people provide powerful backing for the Chinese people."

U.N. Secretary General U Thant visited Moscow, the third world leader (after Indira Gandhi of India and Harold Wilson of the Britain) in two weeks to try to persuade the Soviet Union to endorse a program for ending the war.

30 July

The U.S. began its first bombing of the DMZ with 15 B-52s hitting a PAVN base 1 mile (1.6 km) north of the Bến Hải River.

== August ==
1 August

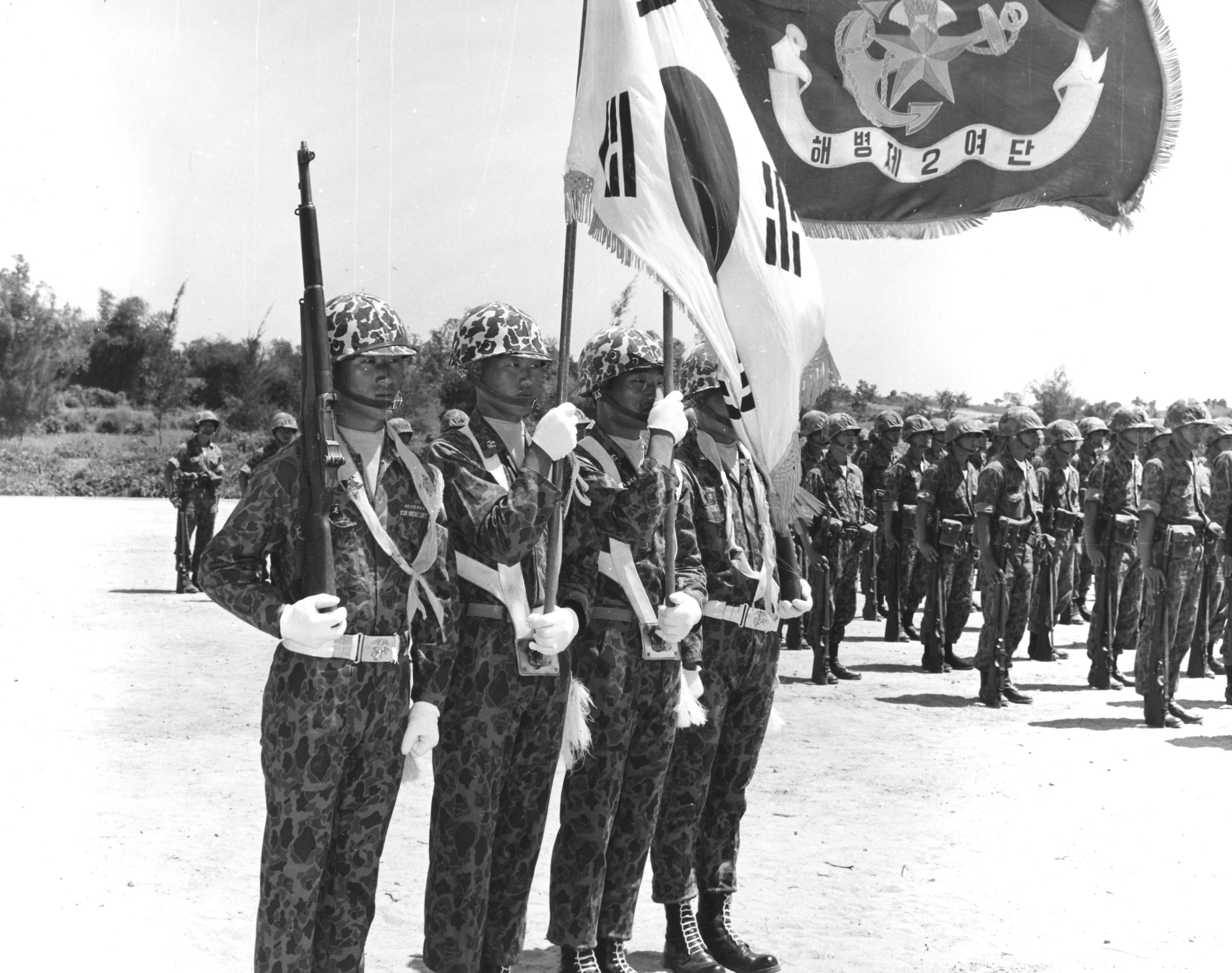
ROKMC 2nd Marine Brigade color guard

The Republic of Korea Marine Corps 2nd Marine Brigade began to arrive at Chu Lai Base Area.

1-25 August

Operation Paul Revere II was conducted by the 1st Cavalry Division, ARVN and ROK forces in western Pleiku and Darlac Provinces. It resulted in 861 PAVN VC killed and 119 captured, 80 U.S. killed and 97 ARVN and ROK killed.

3 August

A U.S. Navy board of inquiry recommended a court-martial for Captain Archie C. Kuntze for misconduct during his two years as commander of the supply depot operations within South Vietnam. Captain Kuntze, who called himself "The American Mayor of Saigon", would be convicted on 14 November of lesser charges involving a romantic affair and would receive a reprimand.

3 August - 31 January 1967

Operation Prairie was a 3rd Marine Division operation to engage PAVN forces south of the DMZ. The operation resulted in 1,329 PAVN killed and 27 captured and a further 1,713 estimated killed, Marine losses were 226 killed.

5 August

The Soviet Union protested against damage to one of its merchant ships in Haiphong, caused by American air attacks. The Soviet diesel vessel Medyn had been moored when it was struck by large caliber bullets during a U.S. air raid on 2 August. Foy D. Kohler, the U.S. Ambassador to Moscow, responded eight days later that the damage had actually been caused by North Vietnamese anti-aircraft fire and that the U.S. planes conducted no strafing operations.

6-22 August

Operation Colorado/Lien Ket 52 was a search and destroy operation by the U.S. 1st Marine Division, Vietnamese Marines and ARVN 2nd Infantry Division in Hiệp Đức District. The operation resulted in 350 PAVN killed and 20+ captured and 14 U.S. and 26 South Vietnamese killed.

7 August

Seven U.S. warplanes were shot down in a single day over North Vietnam, the highest U.S. air loss since the war had begun breaking the previous record of six aircraft downed on 13 August 1965. Within the space of a month, 25 F-105s, the equivalent of an entire USAF squadron had been shot down, mostly by anti-aircraft guns.

8 August

Former Vice President Richard Nixon called for an increase in American military personnel in South Vietnam to 500,000 and advocated that the U.S. should increase bombing of North Vietnam, including Hanoi.

9 August

The Battle of Đức Cơ was an engagement between the PAVN 5th Battalion, 88th Regiment and the U.S. 1st Battalion, 69th Armor Regiment and ROKA 3rd Battalion, 1st Cavalry Regiment. The battle resulted in 197 PAVN and seven Koreans killed.

U.S. aircraft mistakenly attack two South Vietnamese villages killing 63 civilians.

11 August

Three USAF jets mistakenly attack the USCGC Point Welcome operating offshore from the DMZ, killing two United States Coast Guard crewmen and wounding several other crewmen and photojournalist Tim Page.

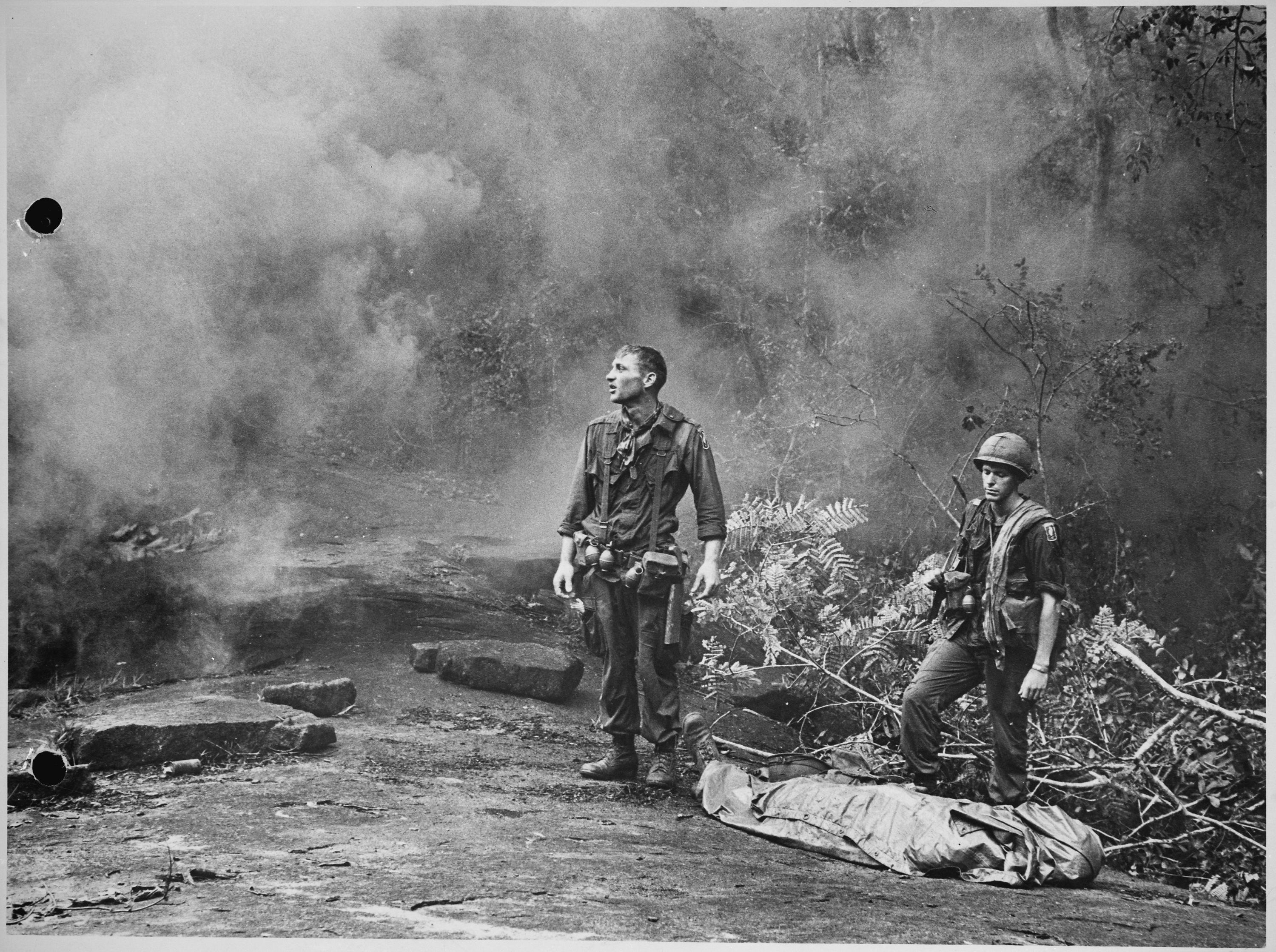
Men of the 4th Battalion, 503rd Infantry, 173rd Airborne Brigade wait for a helicopter to evacuate their dead comrade, 14 August

16 August

The House Un-American Activities Committee began an investigation of Americans who had demonstrated against the war, seeking "evidence that communist organizations were instigating their operations". Twelve demonstrators issued subpoenas to testify on activities such as urging donations to the VC. Eight people in attendance were forcibly removed from the hearing and arrested after they began shouting protests, while nine others were arrested outside the Capitol building for disturbance of the peace. U.S. District Judge Howard F. Corcoran had issued an injunction the day before, prohibiting the hearings from going forward, but a Court of Appeals order had reversed the injunction and the hearings took place as scheduled.

18 August

The Battle of Long Tan was fought between 1 ATF and PAVN/VC forces in a rubber plantation near the village of Long Tần, about 27 kilometres north east of Vung Tau, South Vietnam. The four hour long battle resulted in 245 PAVN/VC killed and three captured and 18 Australians killed. It is arguably the most famous battle fought by the Australian Army during the Vietnam War.

18-21 August

Operation Quang Dien was an ARVN 1st Division search and clear operation in Thừa Thiên Province. The operation resulted in 100 VC and 21 ARVN killed.

20-9 August

Operation Allegheny was a 3rd Marines search and destroy operation 22 km southwest of Da Nang. The operation resulted in 113 PAVN/VC and seven Marines killed.

23 August

The U.S. merchant vessel SS Baton Rouge Victory was sunk by a VC naval mine on the Lòng Tàu River, about 22 miles (35 km) southeast of Saigon. Seven civilian crew members were killed.

23-31 August

Operation Amarillo was a road security operation conducted by 1st Brigade, 1st Infantry Division in Bình Dương Province. The operation resulted in 99 VC and 41 U.S. killed.

25 August

The U.S. House of Representatives overwhelmingly rejected a request by President Johnson for authority to activate the 133,000 military reserve forces (including the Army National Guard and the Air National Guard) for duty in the war. Although the U.S. Senate had approved the plan, the first vote in the House was 162–39 against, and when a roll call was requested, the measure failed 378 to 3.

25-7 August

Operation Long Phi 984 was an ARVN search and destroy operation in Kiên Giang Province. The operation resulted in 132 VC and 30 ARVN killed.

25 August - 1 December 1967

Operation Byrd was a security operation conducted by the U.S. 2nd Battalion, 7th Cavalry Regiment and the ARVN 44th Regiment in Bình Thuận Province. The operation resulted in 913 VC, 11 U.S. and 41 ARVN killed.

== September ==
1 September

U.N. Secretary-General U Thant declared that he would not seek re-election, because of the failure of U.N. efforts to end the war. "Today it seems to me, as it has seemed for many months, that the pressure of events is remorselessly leading toward a major war... In my view the tragic error is being repeated of relying on force and military means in a deceptive pursuit of peace."

In a speech in Phnom Penh, French president Charles de Gaulle denounced the war and called for the U.S. to withdraw its forces from Southeast Asia.

2 September - 11 October

Operation Sunset Beach was an operation conducted by the 2nd Brigade, 25th Infantry Division in Hậu Nghĩa Province, southeastern Tây Ninh Province and southwestern Bình Dương Province. The operation resulted in 80 VC killed and a further 135 estimated killed and 29 U.S. killed.

3 September

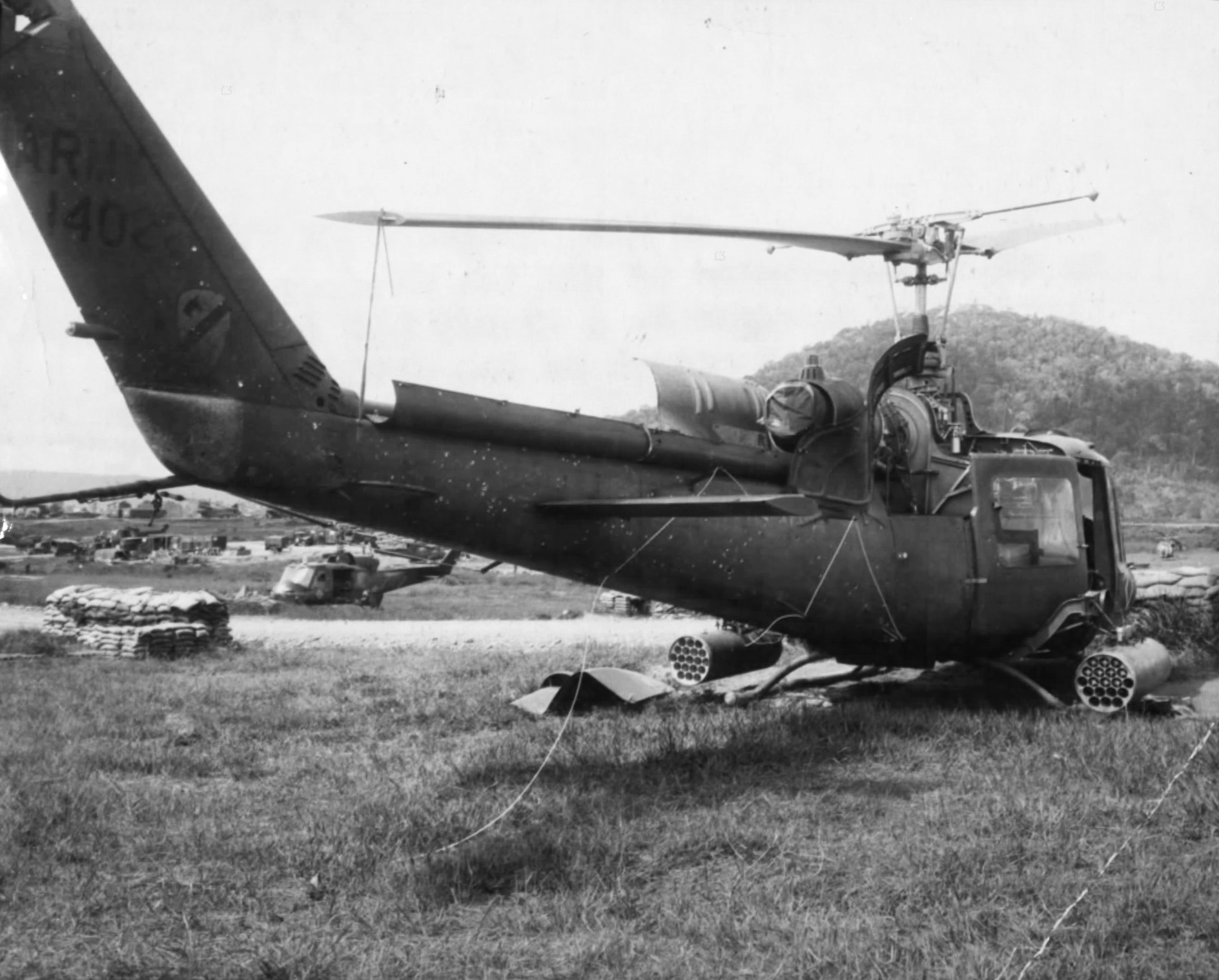
UH-1B damaged by mortar fire at Camp Radcliff

A VC mortar attack on Camp Radcliff killed four U.S. and wounded 76 and damaged 77 helicopters.

4-6 September

Operation Cranston was a 1st Battalion, 16th Infantry Regiment security and resupply operation between Lai Khe and Phu Loi. The operation resulted in 52 VC and two U.S. killed.

5 September

Flying a MiG-17 jet, Nguyễn Văn Bảy became the first VPAF ace and first ace of the war, when he shot down his fifth airplane, a U.S. Navy F-8 Crusader fighter. The U.S. pilot, USAF Captain Wilfred K. Abbott, ejected safely, but was captured and would spend more than six years as a prisoner of war.

5-25 September

Operation Seward was a harvest security operation conducted by the 1st Brigade, 101st Airborne Division in Phú Yên Province. The operation resulted in 239 PAVN/VC and 27 U.S. killed.

5 September to 8 October

The South Korean 9th Infantry Division (White Horse) arrived in South Vietnam and was deployed near Ninh Hòa.

6-9 September

Operation Manh Ho was an ARVN operation in Bình Định Province. The operation resulted in 147 PAVN/VC killed.

7 September

The U.S. Department of Defense announced what would be the largest draft call of the Vietnam War, calling for 49,200 registered men to be inducted into military service for the month of October, the highest numbers since the Korean War.

9 September

According to a complaint registered by the People's Republic of China on September 16, two American F-105 jets strayed from North Vietnam and into the Guangxi Autonomous Region of China and "wantonly strafed Chinese villages and commune members who were working there", wounding three people, until "Aircraft of the Chinese People's Air Force promptly took off to intercept the enemy planes and damaged one of them." U.S. Secretary of State Dean Rusk said that he had no information about such an encounter and said that the U.S. was "looking into it".

10 September

USAF Captain Pete Peterson is captured after his F-4 Phantom was shot down on a bombing mission near Hanoi. In April 1997 he would become the first postwar U.S. ambassador to Vietnam.

11 September

Elections were held in South Vietnam for the first time since the installation of a military regime in November 1963. Despite VC attacks on polling places 80.8% of the 5,288,512 registered voters turned out to elect members of a constituent assembly that would draw up a new constitution. The VC staged 166 separate incidents of intimidation, abduction and assassination killing 19 voters and wounding 120.

13 September - 12 February 1967

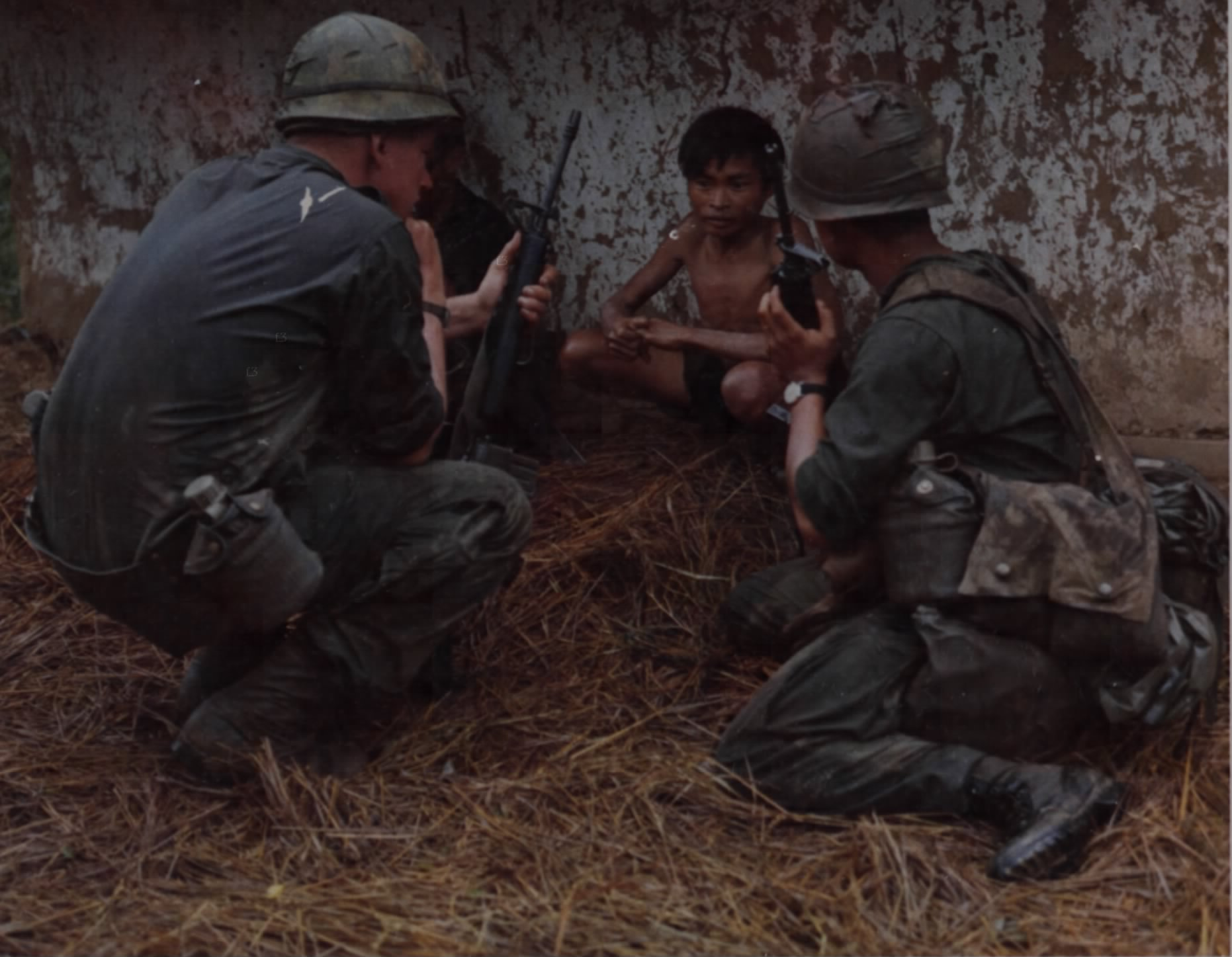
Questioning a VC during Operation Irving

Operations Thayer, Irving and Thayer II were related operations carried out primarily by the 1st Cavalry Division, with support by the ARVN 22nd Division and the ROKA Capital Division, to eliminate PAVN/VC influence in Bình Định Province. The operations resulted in 2,669 PAVN/VC and 296 U.S. killed.

14 September

The Philippines established the headquarters of the Philippine Civic Action Group in Tây Ninh Province. The total number of Philippine soldiers in South Vietnam was 2,000. The U.S. paid all expenses for the Filipinos deployed to South Vietnam and granted additional aid to the Philippines.

14 September - 24 November

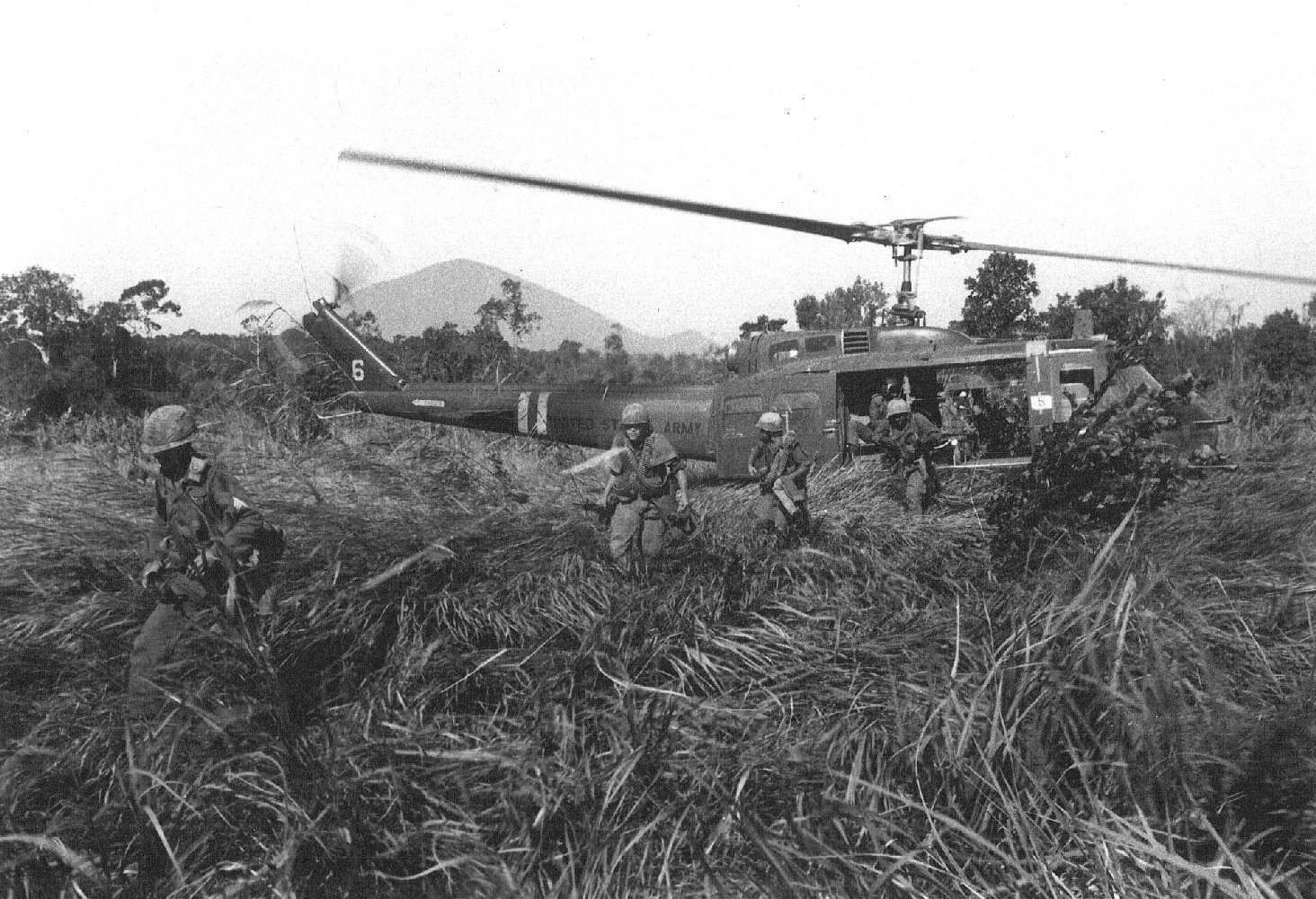
U.S. infantry deploys during Operation Attleboro

Operation Attleboro was a search and destroy operation by the 196th Light Infantry Brigade and elements of the U.S. 1st, 4th and 25th Infantry Divisions northwest of Dau Tieng. The operation resulted in 1,016 PAVN/VC killed and 200+ captured, U.S. losses were 155 killed and five missing.

15-8 September

Operation Deckhouse IV was an operation conducted by the Special Landing Force (SLF) Battalion Landing Team (BLT) of 1st Battalion, 26th Marine Regiment in the eastern DMZ. The operation resulted in 200+ PAVN and 36 Marines killed.

16 September

Buddhist leader Thích Trí Quang ended a 100-day hunger strike that had started after the government had crushed the Buddhist uprising in June. During that time, the 42 year old monk had gone from 130 pounds to only 68 pounds.

17-27 September

Operation Golden Fleece 7-1 was a harvest security operation by the 1st Battalion, 7th Marines in Mộ Đức District. The Marines relocated the occupants of Van Ha, a VC stronghold, and killed 240 VC for the loss of one Marine.

23 September to 30 October

Operation Mang Ho VI was an ROK Capital Division search and destroy operation in Bình Định Province. The operation resulted in 1,161 PAVN/VC and 30 ROK killed.

25 September

The U.S. 4th Infantry Division began deploying to Camp Enari, South Vietnam.

27 September

Two U.S. Marine jets mistakenly bombed a village in the mountains of Quảng Ngãi Province, killing 28 Montagnard civilians and wounding 17 others.

== October ==
2 October

The Soviet military newspaper Red Star published an article that officially confirmed suspicions that military advisers were aiding the North Vietnamese. According to the article, missile specialists had been sent to train the Vietnamese on how to fire SAMs and had been forced to dodge U.S. bombing.

3 October

The West German hospital ship MV Helgoland arrived at Saigon and would treat civilian patients until September 1967 when it moved to Danang.

3 October to 20 November

Operation Lam Son 318 was an ARVN 1st Division operation in Quảng Trị Province. The operation resulted in 179 PAVN/VC, 38 ARVN and one U.S. killed.

8 October

Two days before Soviet Foreign Minister Andrei A. Gromyko met with President Johnson, the Soviet Union announced that it was rejecting the United Kingdom's six-point plan to end the war. British Foreign Secretary George Brown met with Gromyko in London, and proposed that the two nations arrange a peace conference in Geneva. The Soviet position was that, until North Vietnam requested a conference, they would not push for peace negotiations.

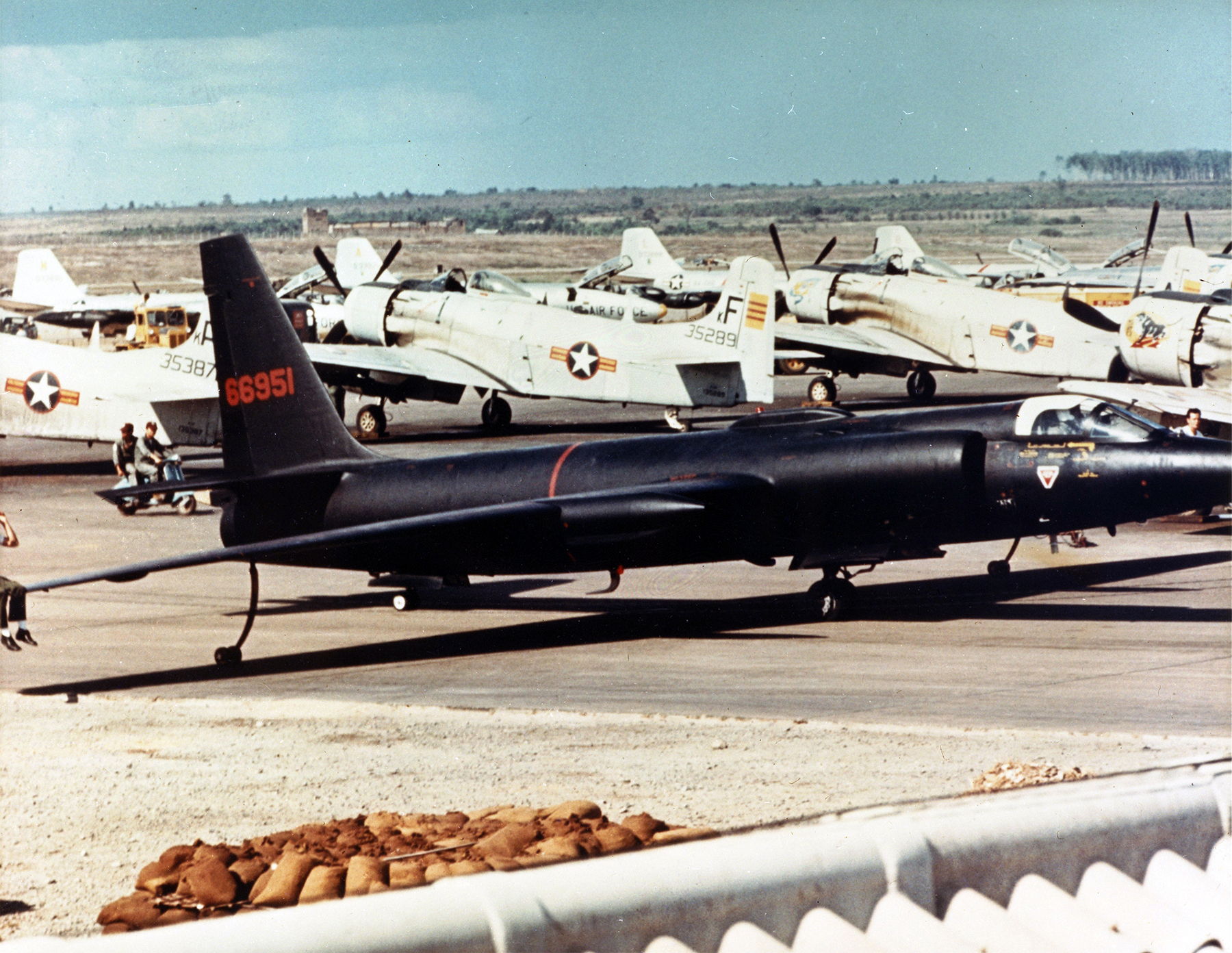
Lockheed U-2 at Bien Hoa Air Base in 1965

9 October

A Lockheed U-2 crashed in VC territory 65 miles (105 km) east-northeast of Saigon after developing mechanical problems on a mission over North Vietnam. A U.S. Army team was sent to destroy the wreckage.

11 October

Allied forces discovered a VC prison complex in Bình Định Province containing the bodies of 12 South Vietnamese who had been machine gunned and grenaded by fleeing guards.

11 October to 14 November

Operation Kailua was a 2nd Brigade, 25th Infantry Division operation in Hậu Nghĩa Province. The operation resulted in 67 PAVN/VC and five U.S. killed.

14 October

U.S. Secretary of Defense Robert McNamara in a memorandum following another visit to South Vietnam said that communist forces were suffering 60,000 killed per year, "yet there is no sign of an impending break in enemy morale and it appears that he can more than replace his losses by infiltration from North Vietnam and recruitment in South Vietnam." McNamara continued: "enemy...forces...are larger; terrorist and sabotage have increased in scope and intensity; more railroads and highways cut; the rice crop expected to come to market is smaller; we control little, if any, more of the population...in the countryside, the enemy almost completely controls the night."

16 October - 2 November

Operation Shenandoah was conducted by 1st Brigade, 1st Infantry Division in Bình Long Province. The operation resulted in 74 VC and five U.S. killed.

18-20 October

Operation Dan Chi 263 was an ARVN operation in Chuong Tien Province. The operation resulted in 138 PAVN/VC, 29 ARVN and one U.S. killed.

19 October - December

Operation Atlanta was a road security operation carried out by the 11th Armored Cavalry Regiment in Đồng Nai Province. The operation resulted in 161 VC and 15 U.S. killed.

20 October - 30 December

Operation Paul Revere IV was a sweep operation conducted by Brigades of the 4th and 25th Infantry Divisions, 1st Cavalry Division and 101st Airborne Division southeast of the Plei Trap Valley near the South Vietnam-Cambodia border. The operation resulted in 1,200 PAVN and 376 U.S. killed.

21 October

Former U.S. President Dwight D. Eisenhower supported Richard Nixon's criticisms of President Johnson for "hesitation, indecision, and even timidity" in South Vietnam.

21-2 October

In the 1966 Laotian coup forces loyal to Generals Ouane Rattikone and Bounthone Marthepharak defeated a coup led by Royal Lao Air Force commander Brigadier General Thao Ma and forced him to flee into exile in Thailand.

24-5 October

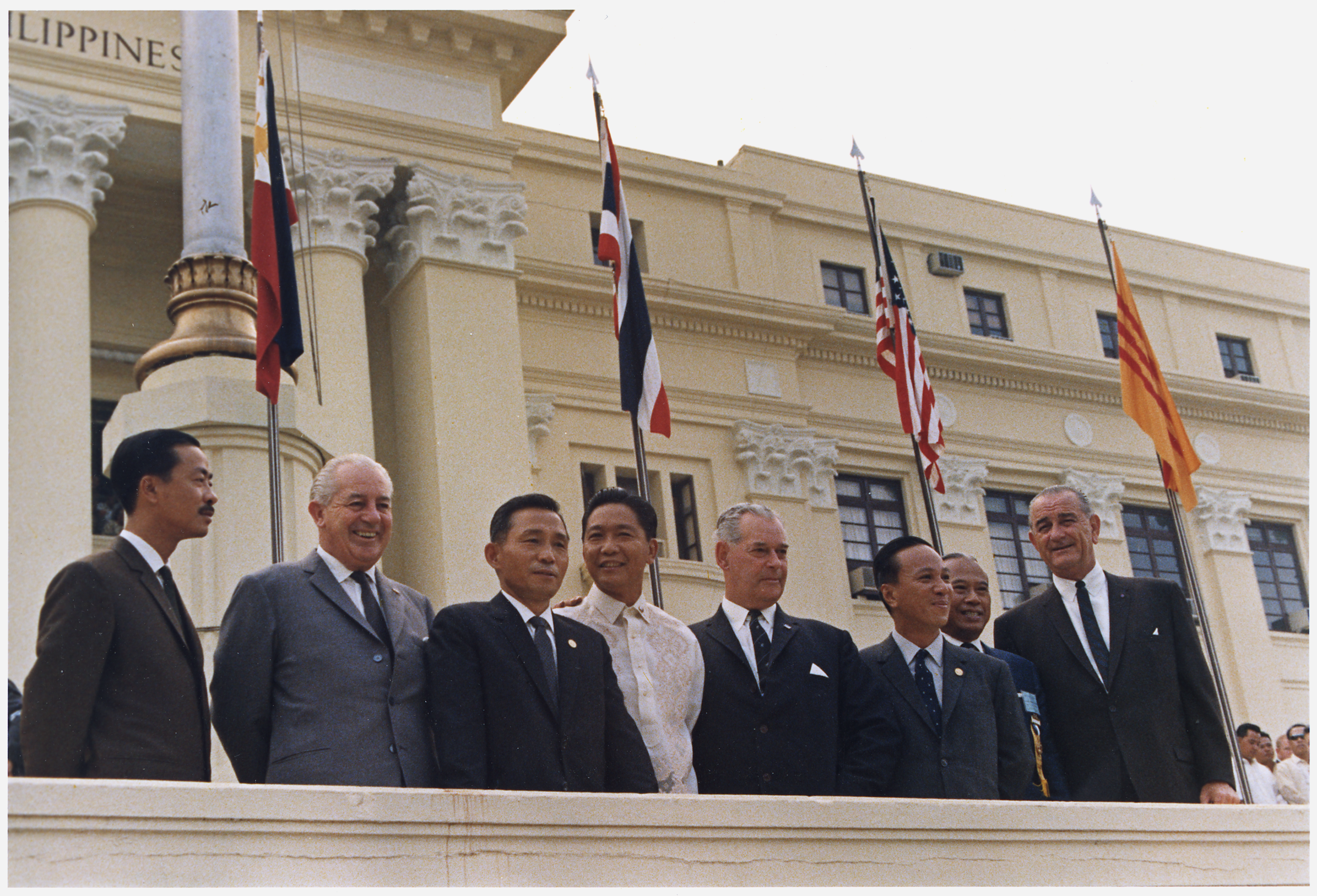
Manila Summit Conference

President Johnson met with the leaders of Australia, New Zealand, the Philippines, South Korea, South Vietnam and Thailand at the Manila Summit Conference in the Philippines. The leaders offered an American troop withdrawal from South Vietnam in six months contingent upon a North Vietnamese withdrawal of its troops and support for the VC. North Vietnam's Prime Minister Pham Van Dong, responded, "Never Munich again, in whatever form," and pledged that his nation "will fight until final victory against the U.S. imperialists."

25 October to 2 April 1967

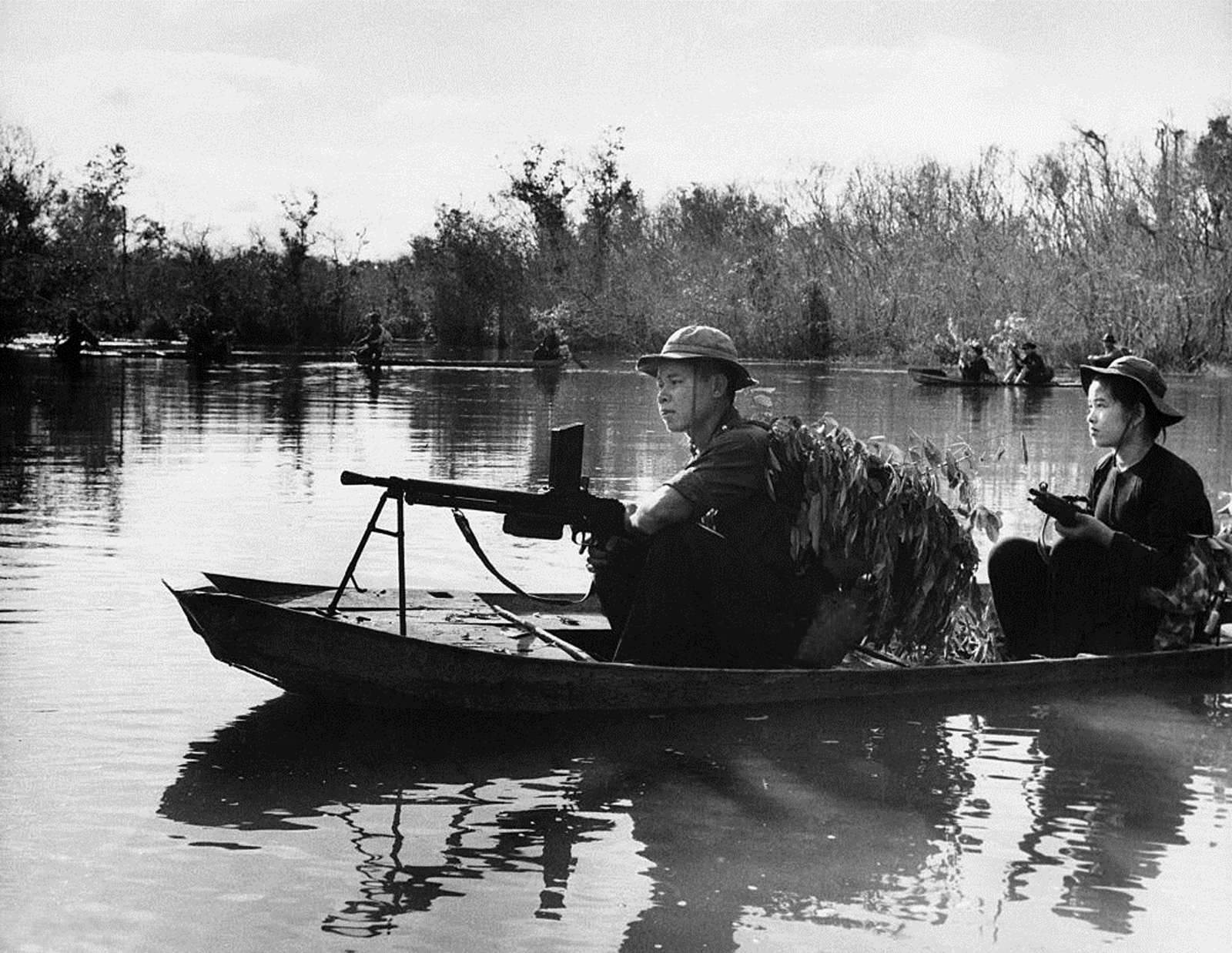
Viet Cong guerrillas in small boats patrol the Saigon River in South Vietnam. October 1966

Operation Adams was a 1st Brigade, 4th Infantry Division, 1st Brigade, 101st Airborne Division and ARVN 47th Regiment rice harvest security operation in Phú Yên Province. The operation resulted in 491 PAVN/VC and 51 U.S./ARVN killed.

25–31 October 1968

Operation Sea Dragon was a series of American-led naval operations to interdict sea lines of communications and supply going south from North Vietnam to South Vietnam and to destroy land targets with naval gunfire.

26 October

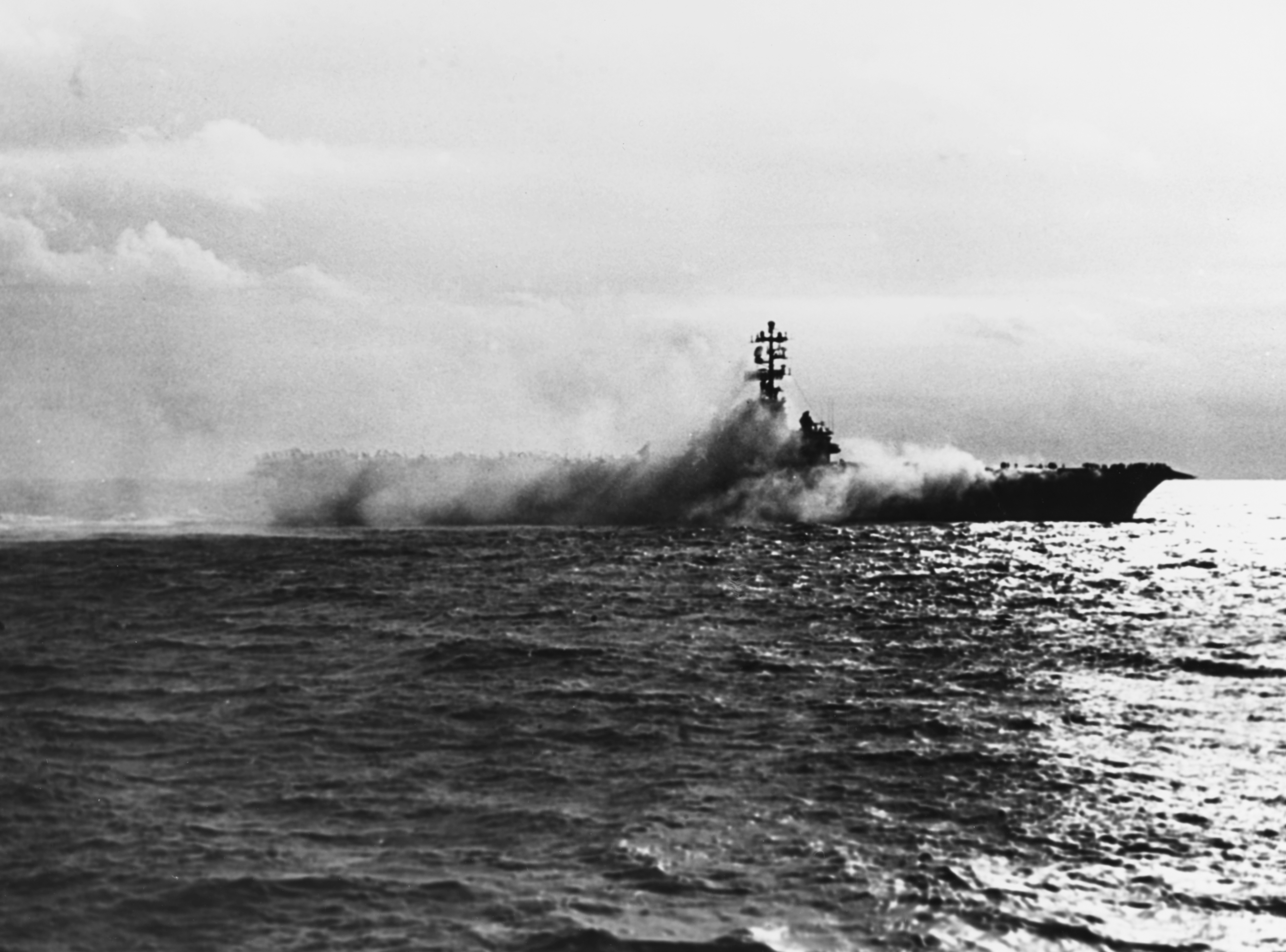
USS Oriskany on fire

A fire aboard the aircraft carrier USS Oriskany in the Gulf of Tonkin killed 44 crewmen and seriously injured 15 others. Thirty-four of the dead were officers, and 24 of them were pilots.

President Johnson stopped briefly in South Vietnam after the conclusion of a summit meeting in the Philippines. Landing at the Cam Ranh Base in an unannounced visit, Johnson spent almost two and a half hours addressing American troops, then personally presenting medals, including 24 Purple Hearts to wounded men at the base hospital.

31 October - 4 December

Operation Geronimo was an operation conducted by the U.S. 1st Brigade, 4th Infantry Division, 1st Brigade, 101st Airborne Division, ROK 28th Infantry Regiment, 9th Infantry Division and ARVN 47th Infantry Regiment, 22nd Division against the PAVN 18B Regiment. The operation resulted in 150 PAVN killed and 76 captured and 16 U.S. killed.

October - December 1971

Project 100,000 was a program to accept low-IQ draftees who scored in the 10-30 percentile range in the Armed Forces Qualification Test into the U.S. military. These draftees, known pejoratively as "McNamara's Morons" or the "Moron Corps" suffered proportionately higher casualty rates in the war than other draftees.

== November ==
1 November

The VC launch an artillery attack on the National Day parade in Saigon firing more than 30 shells into the city, killing seven South Vietnamese and one American officer.

2 November

A grenade was thrown by a VC at Phú Thọ Racetrack, Saigon, killing two persons and wounding eight others, including two children.

3 November

VC squads infiltrated the outskirts of Saigon and fired 24 recoilless rifle shells on the city. Among the buildings hit were Bến Thành Market, Grall Hospital, Saigon Cathedral, a seminary chapel and several private homes. Eight persons were killed and 37 seriously wounded.

4 November

A fire on the USS Franklin D. Roosevelt killed seven sailors.

5-8 November

Operation Lien Ket 68 was an ARVN 2nd Division search and destroy operation in Quảng Tín Province. The operation resulted in 109 PAVN/VC and 64 ARVN killed.

7 November

MACV and the Joint General Staff promulgated the Combined Campaign Plan 1967 to extend the area controlled by the South Vietnamese Government and to win victories over PAVN/VC units.

After giving an address at Harvard University, McNamara was mobbed by students opposed to the war and has to be escorted out by police.

9-27 November

Operation Dragon Eye was an ROK 2nd Marine Brigade search and destroy operation in Quảng Ngãi Province. The operation resulted in 154 PAVN/VC, 38 ROK and four U.S. killed. In the village of Phuoc Binh, Quảng Ngãi Province, South Korean troops massacred 68 villagers, most of them women and children.

18-9 November

In the Incident on Hill 192 five men of C Company, 2nd Battalion, 8th Cavalry, 1st Cavalry Division kidnapped, gang raped and murdered Phan Thi Mao, a young Vietnamese woman. One of the group later reported the crime and the other four were convicted of murder and served sentences of 22 months to four years.

19 November

Eight VC mortar rounds on Can Giuoc, Long An Province, killed two children; 12 civilians were wounded. 20 mortar rounds hit Can Duoc, wounding five civilians.

19-27 November

Operation Lien Ket 70 was an ARVN 2nd Division search and destroy operation in Quảng Ngãi Province. The operation resulted in 123 PAVN/VC and three ARVN killed.

25 November

Eight civilian Page Communications Engineers employees and one U.S. Army 1st Signal Brigade soldier were killed in a VC ambush of their convoy en route to the Pr Line signal site (11.868°N 108.547°E) near Da Lat.

29 November to 5 December

Operation Healdsburg was a 3rd Brigade, 1st Infantry Division search and destroy operation. The operation resulted in 113 PAVN/VC killed.

30 November

The United States, South Vietnam and their other allies in the Vietnam War agreed to a proposal from the VC and North Vietnam for three ceasefires to coincide with holidays. All fighting would halt from 07:00 24 December, until 07:00 on 26 December, as well as from the morning of New Year's Eve until the morning of 2 January 1967. In addition, there would be a four-day ceasefire during the 1967 Tết holidays, celebrated in both North Vietnam and South Vietnam, that marked the traditional start of the Vietnamese new year, with a truce to last between 8 and 12 February 1967.

The VC shelled Tân Uyên market, Bien Hoa Province, killing three civilians and wounding seven.

== December ==
December - 15 December 1967

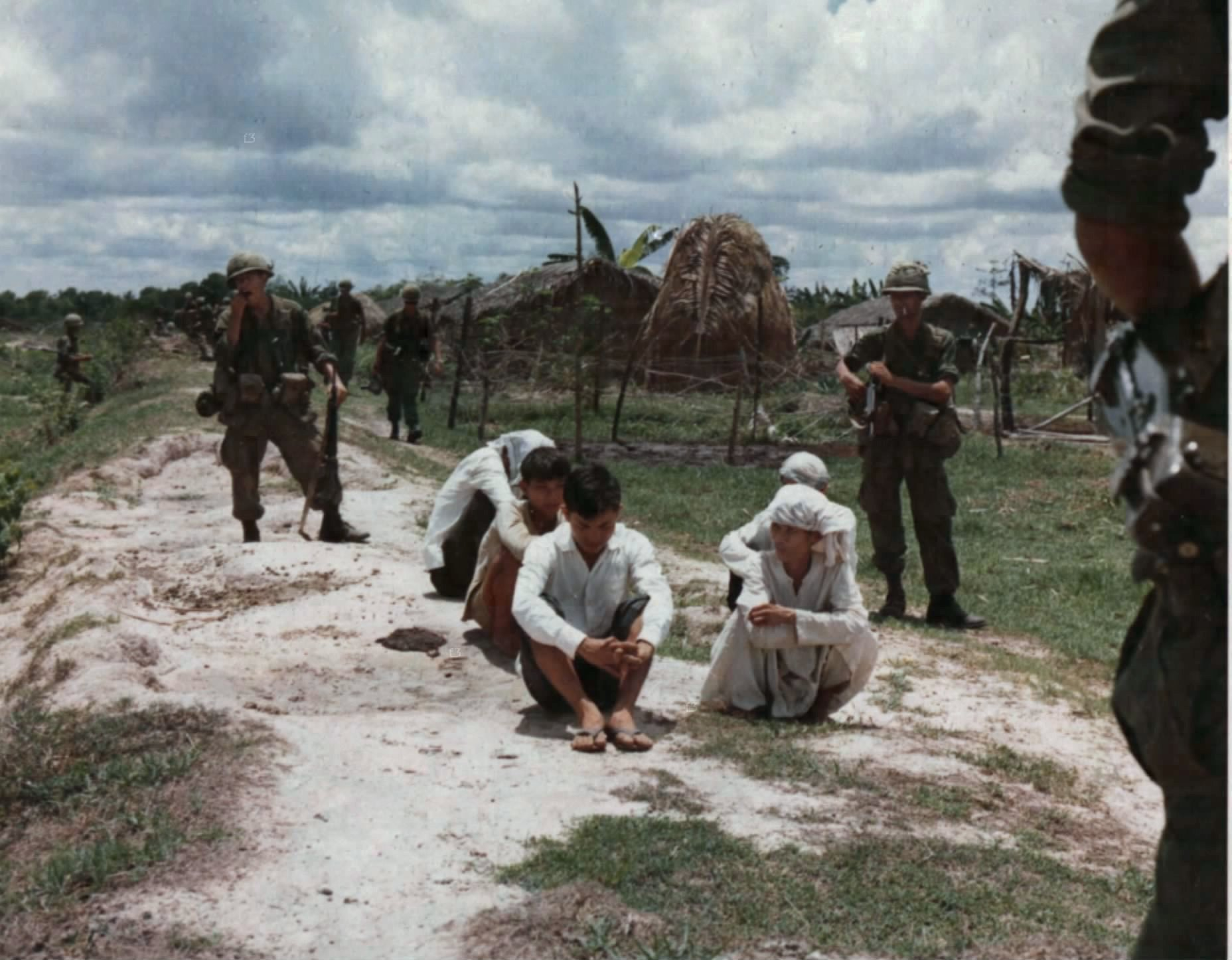
VC suspects detained during Operation Fairfax

Operation Fairfax was a joint counterinsurgency/pacification operation conducted by II Field Force, Vietnam and the ARVN in Gia Định Province near Saigon. The operation resulted in 1,200 VC killed or captured.

4–5 December

The VC conduct a sapper and mortar attack on Tan Son Nhut Air Base. The attack resulted in 28 VC killed and four captured, three U.S. and three ARVN killed. Twenty aircraft were damaged and three vehicles destroyed.

7 December

Trần Văn Văn, considered a leading candidate for President of South Vietnam, was assassinated by the VC in Saigon after leaving the office of Prime Minister Kỳ. Tran, a 58 year old politician who had formerly been the Secretary General of the nation's High National Council, had recently been elected as to the 117 member assembly that was to draw up a new constitution. He was riding in a car when a VC on a motorcycle pulled alongside and killed him with four shots.

8 December to 19 January 1967

Operation Pickett was a 1st Brigade, 101st Airborne Division search and destroy operation in Kon Tum Province. The operation resulted in 62 PAVN and 20 U.S. killed.

10 December

Sixteen U.S. Marines were killed and 11 others injured when a Marine bomber accidentally dropped two 250 pound bombs on them. The Marines were fighting near Đông Hà in Quảng Trị Province, when they came under a mortar attack, and were firing their own 81 mm shells when the bombs "either bounced off a ridge of boulders, or fell about 300 yards (270 m) yards from their intended target."

A taxi on Highway 29, Phong Dinh Province ran over a mine. Five passengers, all women, were killed and the driver badly wounded.

13 December

The U.S. Department of Defense confirmed for the first time that a USAF pilot was being held captive in the People's Republic of China, after his F-104 Starfighter went down over China's Hainan Island. China had long maintained that it had an American pilot who had been captured alive in its territory. The United States said that Captain Philip E. Smith had either been shot down or had had a mechanical failure on 20 September 1965.

A bomb explosion killed three CORDS personnel and wounded nine who were attending a course at the Ca Mau school, An Xuyen Province.

13-16 December

U.S. aircraft bomb the Yên Viên railyard 6 miles (9.7 km) northeast of Hanoi and a truck park 2 miles (3.2 km) south of Hanoi. The North Vietnamese and Soviet and East German media report that the U.S. is bombing residential areas and killing civilians. The U.S. denies that they have been bombing the city.

19 December

MACV's long-standing estimates were that the PAVN/VC forces in South Vietnam numbered 282,000. CIA analyst Sam Adams wrote a memo stating that "the number of Viet Cong is closer to 600,000 and perhaps more." The memo would initiate a lengthy debate between MACV and the CIA concerning the number of VC.

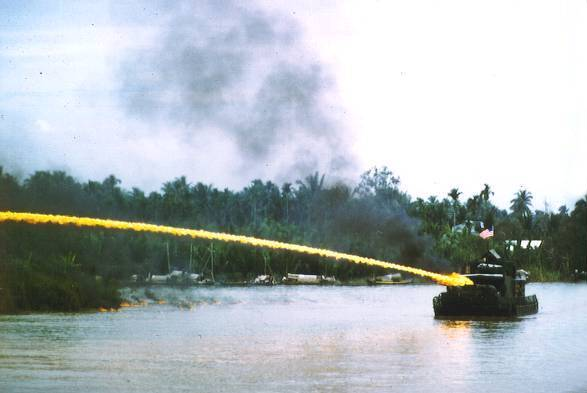
A Mobile Riverine Force boat fires a flamethrower

The U.S. Army deployed its new Mobile Riverine Force into combat for the first time, with the 2nd Brigade of the 9th Infantry Division arriving at Vung Tau.

20 December to 16 February 1967

Operation Chinook was a 4th Marines operation in Thừa Thiên Province. the operation resulted in 218 PAVN killed.

23 December

The destroyer USS O'Brien became the first U.S. ship to be struck by shells fired from North Vietnamese shore batteries in Quảng Bình Province killing two crewmen and wounding four.

24 December

A Flying Tiger Line Canadair CL-44 cargo plane crashed into the Hòa Vang District of Da Nang, killing at least 125 civilians and the plane's crew of four. The four-engine turboprop fell short of the runway as it attempted to land in fog at Da Nang Air Base.

Starting at 07:00 a 48-hour holiday ceasefire went into effect, five hours into the ceasefire, however, Australian troops were fired upon by VC near Saigon and six other incidents took place, including a small arms and mortar fire attack near Phú Lộc in Thừa Thiên Province, that killed an ARVN soldier.

During a visit to MACV in Saigon Cardinal Francis Spellman described the war as a "war for civilization" and that anything "less than victory is inconceivable." Spellman's comments were met with disapproval by the Vatican.

25 December

The New York Times published a front page investigative report, "A Visitor to Hanoi Inspects Damage Laid to U.S. Raids", filed by editor Harrison E. Salisbury stating "Contrary to the impression given by U.S. communiques on-the-spot inspection indicates that U.S. bombing has been inflicting considerable civilian casualties and its environs for some time past." Salisbury claimed that the towns of Nam Định and Phủ Lý had been extensively bombed with Phủ Lý completely destroyed.

27 December

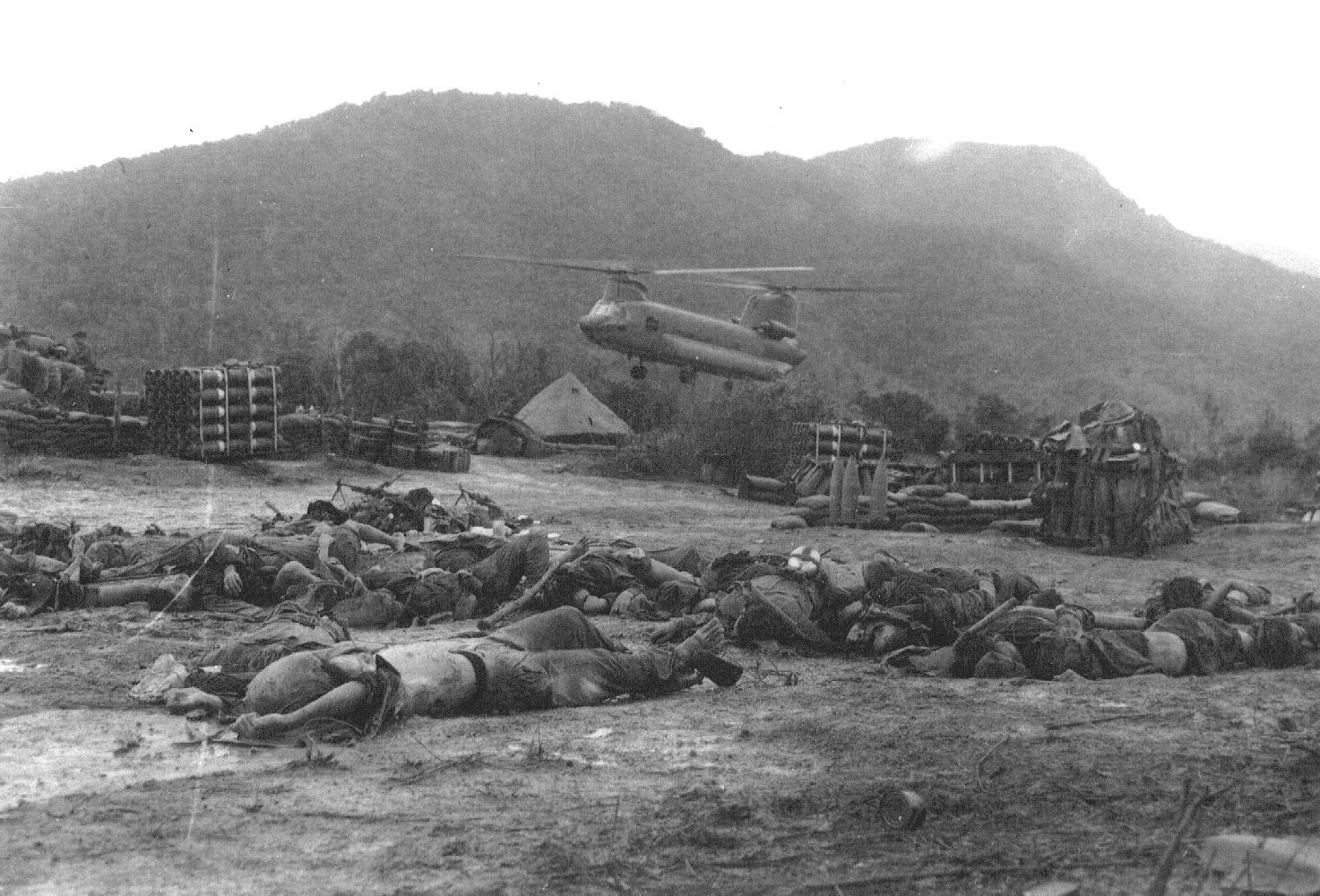
PAVN dead at Firebase Bird

The PAVN 22nd Regiment attacked Firebase Bird located in the Kim Son Valley and occupied by C Battery 6th Battalion, 16th Artillery and B Battery 2nd Battalion, 19th Artillery and defended by elements of the 1st Battalion, 12th Cavalry. The PAVN breached the perimeter and occupied most of the artillery positions, but were eventually forced out. The U.S. lost 27 killed in the attack and 267 PAVN were killed in the attack and the four day pursuit of the attacking unit.

The VC attempted to assassinate National Constituent Assemblyman, Dr. Phan Quang Dan, when a car bomb detonated as Dan opened the door. Dan escaped with minor wounds but a woman passerby was killed and five civilians wounded.

27-31 December

A U.S./ARVN operation against a VC stronghold in the U Minh Forest killed 104 VC and captured 18.

29 December

Responding to Salisbury's report the U.S. Assistant Secretary of Defense confirmed that Nam Định had been attacked 64 times since mid-1965, but that only military targets had been hit.

30 December

U.S. and ARVN troops crossed the border into the Svay Rieng Province of Cambodia in pursuit of a fleeing VC force, and conducted a ground and air assault on the village of Ba Thu.

Operation Marigold, a secret attempt to reach a compromise solution to the war, failed after attempts by Polish diplomat Janusz Lewandowski and the Italian ambassador in Saigon, Giovanni D'Orlandi, in collaboration with American ambassador Lodge.

USS Mahnomen County was driven ashore near Chu Lai by surf and high winds of Typhoon Pamela. Attempts to refloat it during January 1967 were unsuccessful and the ship was stripped and demolished.

31 December

The Selective Service System drafted 382,010 men into military service in 1966, the highest total during the war. By comparison, in 1962, only 82,060 men were drafted

== Year in numbers ==
Armed Force	Strength	KIA	Reference	Military costs – 1966	Military costs – 2026	Reference
South Vietnam	735,900	11,953
United States	485,300	6,350
South Korea	45,566
Thailand	244
Australia	4,525
Philippines	2,061
New Zealand	155
Viet Cong and North Vietnam	282,000

== See also ==
List of allied military operations of the Vietnam War (1966)
