= III Corps (South Vietnam) =

Corps of the South Vietnamese Army

- Quân đoàn III
- Active: 1959–1975
- Country: South Vietnam
- Branch: ARVN
- Type: Corps
- Garrison/HQ: Saigon; Bien Hoa
- Mottos: Chiến Thắng và Xây Dựng (Victory and Rebuilding)
- Engagements: Vietnam War: Fall of Saigon

Commanders
- Notable commanders: Đỗ Cao Trí; Nguyễn Văn Minh; Nguyễn Văn Toàn; Dư Quốc Đống; Trần Quang Khôi; Thái Quang Hoàng; Lê Nguyên Khang

Insignia
- Division flag

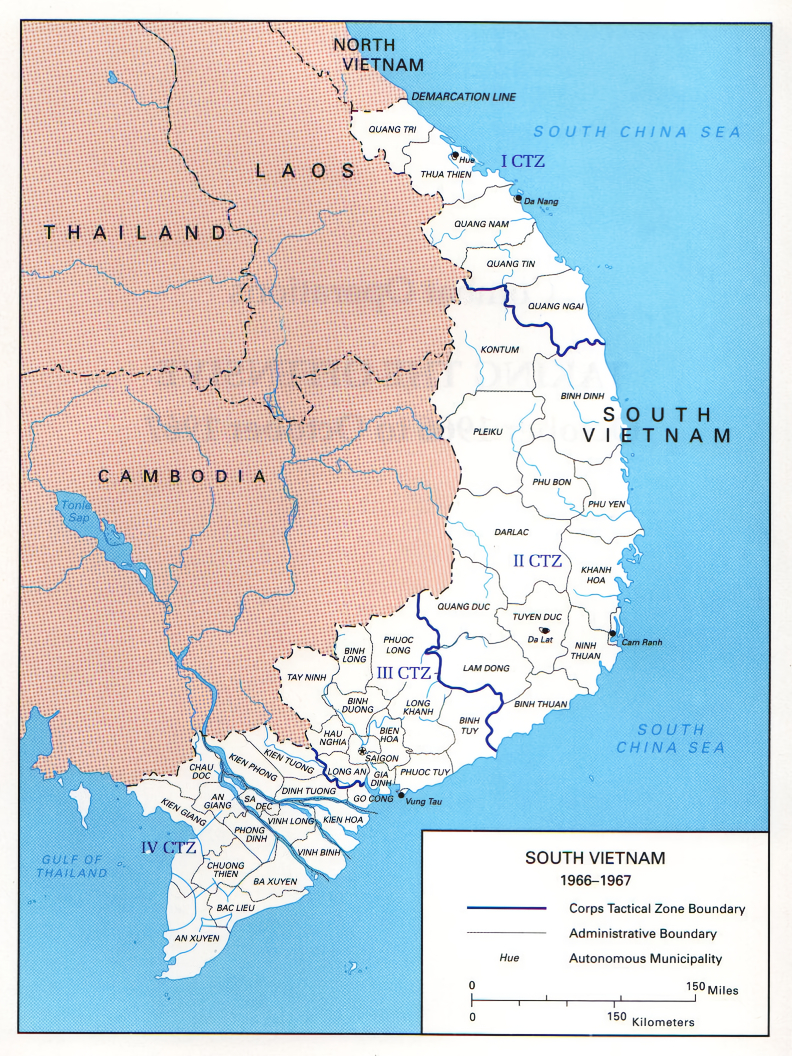
Map depicting the military regions of South Vietnam including III Corps

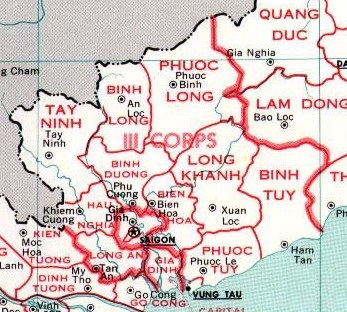
Map of III Corps Tactical Zone

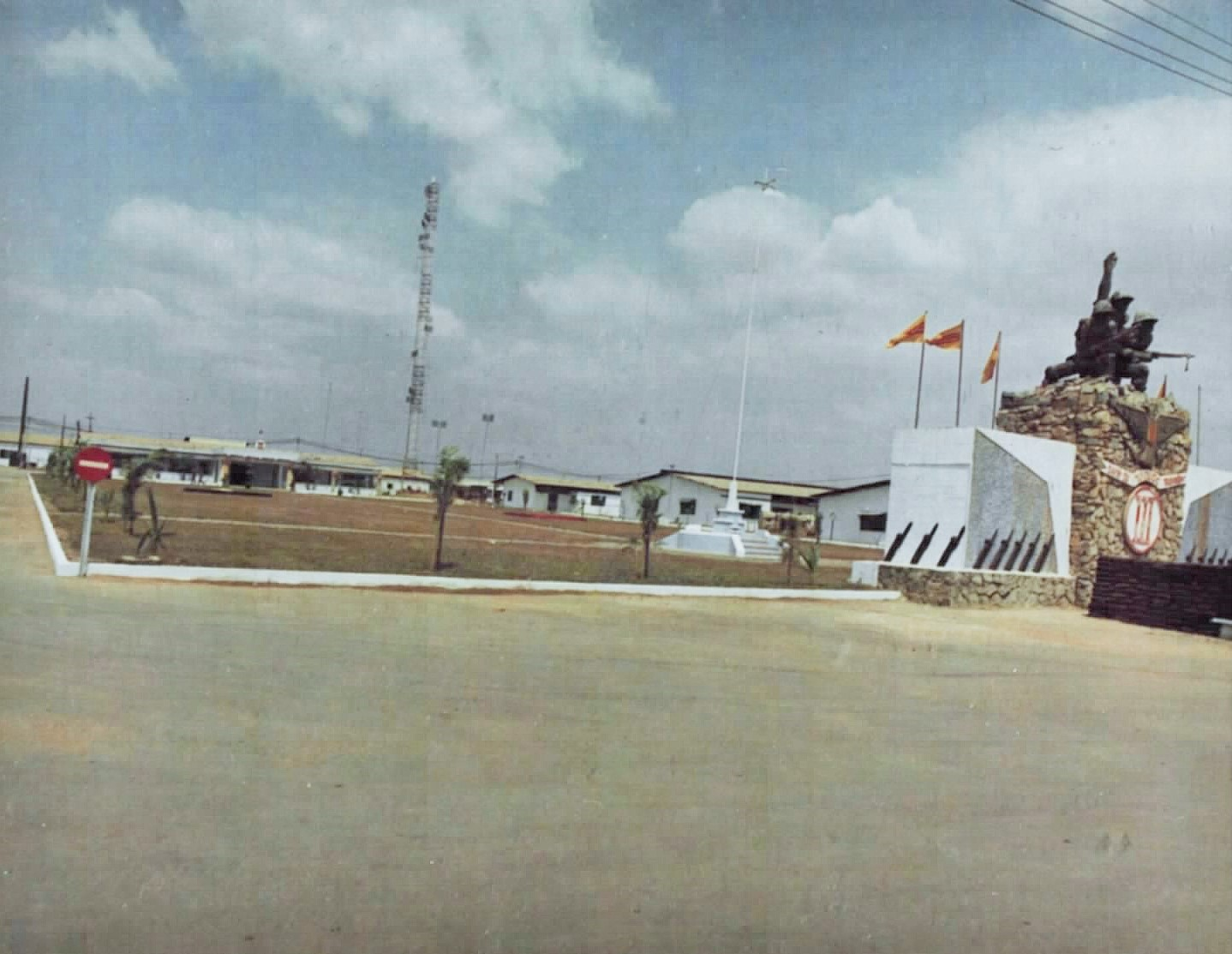
III Corps headquarters at Bien Hoa

III Corps ( Vietnamese: Quân đoàn III) was a corps of the Army of the Republic of Vietnam (ARVN), the army of the nation state of South Vietnam that existed from 1955 to 1975. It was one of four corps in the ARVN, and oversaw the region of the country surrounding the capital Saigon.

== History ==
=== 1959-1963 ===
III Corps headquarters was activated in September 1959 at Bien Hoa and controlled the country south of Phan Thiet, excluding Saigon which was controlled by the Capital Military District (CMD). Its assigned units being the 11th and 13th Light Divisions at Tay Ninh and the 4th Field Division at Bien Hoa.

In 1962, President Ngô Đình Diệm decided to split the Corps into two, the former III Corps area being reduced in size to cover the area northeast of Saigon and the newly created IV Corps taking over the west and southwest.

The 5th Division based in Bien Hoa on the northern outskirts of Saigon was a part of III Corps, and due to the division's close proximity to the capital was a key factor in the success or failure of the various coup attempts in the nation's history.

Following the 1963 South Vietnamese coup d'état, the junta had appointed General Tôn Thất Đính to command III Corps. In January 1964, the junta changed its mind and replaced Đính with General Trần Thiện Khiêm.

In December 1963, with the Corps' leadership in a state of flux, the senior U.S. military advisor, Colonel Wilbur Wilson took the initiative to draft goals for the coming year. "Close coordination between military and civil administrators must be emphasized," he wrote, to bring 95% of the Corps' population under control by the end of 1964. Not only did he want to see more hamlets built, but he also sought to improve existing hamlets by introducing better-trained officials and significant socioeconomic programs. Militarily, his first priority was to improve the militia and the Self-Defense Corps. With these forces more able to secure their communities, the Civil Guard and the army would be able to engage in offensive combat. Wilson wanted infantry units maintained at 90% strength and kept in the field 20 days per month. He believed small-unit operations, backed by robust programs of civic, psychological, and intelligence action, held the key to success.

=== 1964 ===
On 30 January 1964 General Nguyễn Khánh overthrew General Dương Văn Minh in a bloodless coup. By 6 March Khánh had replaced three of the four Corps commanders. Khánh appointed Brigadier general Lâm Văn Phát as the new III Corps commander. A March 1964 assessment by Wilson, described Phát as a "personally very charming" former French officer who spoke excellent English. "As a matter of protocol will almost always agree with a recommendation on most any subject, but this does not mean that the recommendation will be implemented." Politically ambitious but "professionally incompetent and emotionally unstable," Phát was known to "lash out with his swagger stick and give... a caning on the spot" to any soldier who displeased him. Yet at the same time, he exhibited what Wilson termed "almost a psychopathic horror of issuing a direct order to a subordinate." In April, Khánh replaced Phát with Brigadier general Trần Ngọc Tám.

On 24 February 1964 Khánh issued the 1964 National Campaign Plan under the name Chien Thang (Struggle for Victory). Khanh decided the provinces surrounding Saigon would receive top priority in the distribution of troops, civil servants, and money. The rest of III Corps and IV Corps were next in the resource queue, whereas the provinces of II and I Corps had the lowest priority. One reason why the north received the least resources was that, at least before late 1963, it had appeared to be in the best shape. Thus, Chien Thang forecast that I and II Corps would be the first to enter into the final phase, the destruction of the enemy's last major formations and bases in January 1965, whereas III and IV Corps would not reach that point until January 1966.

To implement pacification in its most important areas, III Corps organized 700 civilian cadre in 35 groups of 20 men each. Each group consisted of a command element, a police team, a militia training team, a psychological warfare team, and a health team. The plan envisioned that the groups would follow on the heels of military forces as they cleared territory. Their mission was to separate the people from VC operatives and to establish control. Once done, they would gradually transfer authority to normal civil government. Reflecting government priorities, III Corps assigned the groups to Hau Nghia, Gia Dinh, Binh Duong, Tay Ninh, Long An, Bien Hoa, and Dinh Tuong provinces, as well as the newly created province of Go Cong.

Assisting III Corps, Wilson had under his operational control several hundred advisers, the 145th Aviation Battalion and the Utility Tactical Transport Company, redesignated as the 68th Aviation Company in March 1964.

Opposing the allies was a robust VC force consisting of two regimental headquarters, nine battalions, plus many smaller units for a total of 18,000 regulars, a figure nearly equal to the number of VC regulars in the rest of South Vietnam. After considering the enemy’s irregulars, MACV estimated that the government outnumbered the VC by just 2:1 in III Corps. Binh Duong and Hau Nghia provinces were VC strongholds, Phuoc Thanh province hosted War Zone D, while Tay Ninh province, hosted COSVN headquarters and War Zone C in the north.

The high command subdivided III Corps into nine military commands. Initially, six of these reported to the III Corps commander, one reported to his naval aide, and two reported directly to the Joint General Staff (JGS). The official reason for the division of authority was to address local circumstances better and to avoid overburdening the Corps' commander and his two division commanders. MACV came to see the multiplicity of commands as a weakness, as the commands did not have the staff required to operate effectively.

In early 1964 the Vietnamese agreed to test a new system for handling immediate requests for aviation assistance from US and Republic of Vietnam Air Forces operating in the Corps. MACV stationed air liaison officers, forward air controllers, and radio operators at each special zone, regiment, and division headquarters, as well as at the headquarters for the Corps and the airborne brigade. Initially, the new system consisted entirely of USAF people, with the plan to transition eventually to an all-Vietnamese system once enough personnel were available. MACV envisioned that the system would fast-track impromptu requests for air support, bypassing province chiefs and intermediary commanders.

On 8 June 1964 Corps' commander Tam told his subordinate commanders that the government was losing the war. Over the past two months, the ARVN had lost 489 dead in III Corps compared to 328 dead insurgents, and he believed the vc exaggerated their losses. He blamed the officer corps' lack of aggressiveness, knowledge, and leadership for the situation.

In July the VC launched their summer offensive with a series of attacks on isolated outposts and then ambushing the relief forces. Activity subsided in August and then surged again in September.

On 1 September the Hop Tac pacification program was launched in the Corps' provinces immediately surrounding Saigon - Gia Dinh, Bien Hoa, Binh Duong, Hau Nghia, Long An, and Phuoc Tuy.

On 5 September, the JGS abolished the Tien Giang Tactical Area. It transferred the 7th Division and four of the five provinces it supervised to IV Corps and assigned Long An Province to III Corps.

Also in September the 25th Division began moving from II Corps to Hau Nghia province to support Hop Tac pacification operations, leaving behind one of its regiments in Quang Ngai. The JGS then assigned one of the independent regiments already stationed in III Corps to the 25th Division to build the organization back up to its full complement. As predicted, desertions grew and morale sank because of the move. In MACV commander General William Westmoreland's opinion, it took about three years for the 25th Division to regain its efficiency. Westmoreland believed it would have been better to have left the 25th Division in Quang Ngai and to have organized an entirely new division for service in III Corps. In addition, the JGS abolished the Binh Lam Special Zone in III Corps and divvied up its provinces. Long Khanh now fell under the Phuoc Bien Special Zone, and Lam Dong, Binh Thuan, and Binh Tuy provinces were reassigned from III Corps to II Corps.

In mid-October Major general Cao Văn Viên replaced Tam as the Corps' commander.

For their winter-spring offensive in III Corps, COSVN planned a major campaign for late December 1964. Instead of targeting the western part of the Corps, which had been the site of most of the major battles of 1964, it chose the relatively quiet east. After preliminary attacks on Bình Giã in early December, the VC launched a full-scale attack on 28 December and in a battle that lasted until 1 January 1965 they achieved a significant victory over several units of elite South Vietnamese forces.

During 1964 population control was assessed to have increased from 45% in January to 49% in December.

By the end of 1964 a US Army helicopter aviation company or US Marine Corps helicopter squadron was assigned in direct support of each Vietnamese infantry division, with two additional helicopter companies in general support of III and IV Corps. Further fixed-wing transport, reconnaissance, and observation aircraft were available as well. As a result, each senior Corps adviser had between 70 and 100 aircraft at his disposal, with MACV retaining control over the rest.

=== 1965 ===
Following their victory at Bình Giã, COSVN recalled its two main force regiments to base areas to rest and refit. It completed the formation of new units of regulars and sought to secure further its supply lines from Cambodia and between War Zones C and D. Lastly, COSVN developed Plan X, a scheme for what it hoped would be a general uprising in and around Saigon. Plan X gave the Saigon-Gia Dinh Military Region the task of creating a commando unit large enough to capture key targets in Saigon in one swift, decapitating blow. Supplementing the commandos would be armed teams based in every sector of the city. They would lead the city's residents to action on the appointed day. The Saigon-Gia Dinh Military Region was also to raise five spearhead battalions that would converge quickly on the city to reinforce the commandos and armed teams until COSVN’s main force regiments arrived from outside the region. Preparations began in January with the formation of a new mobile regiment and the Group 165A Training Center in Tay Ninh province.

MACV's priority in III Corps was to advance pacification, particularly in the Hop Tac region. With more than two dozen battalions routinely assigned to Hop Tac security and 78% of the Corps' regular army units assigned to pacification and security missions, the number of forces left in the Corps for offensive actions was limited. Security was particularly tenuous in Phuoc Tuy and Phuoc Long, in part because the Saigon government had failed to respond to requests to raise more Regional Forces in these two provinces. Throughout the Corps, the VC weakened the public's confidence by occasionally bombarding key towns with mortars.

In early March the VC began a new terrorist bombing campaign in Saigon. On 4 March, a bomb exploded outside a Saigon bar, killing four children. A week later, a mine destroyed a bus in Long An province, killing 13 civilians. On 30 March, a car bomb detonated outside the US embassy, killing two Americans and 20 Vietnamese.

Despite deterioration in some areas, the level of government control and influence increased marginally in III Corps during the first three months of the year, thanks to the Hop Tac program, from 49% to 52%. The number of people believed to be under firm control rose more slowly from 23% to 24%.

On 5 May the 173rd Airborne Brigade began arriving in South Vietnam, becoming the first US Army combat unit deployed to the war. The brigade was initially responsible for providing security for Bien Hoa Air Base and the port of Vung Tau. The Brigade conducted its first combat patrols around Bien Hoa in mid-May and around Vung Tau on 26 May.

In mid-May the new 10th Infantry Division was formed. Headquartered in Long Khanh province, it assumed responsibility for the defense of eastern III Corps.

COSVN's goal for its summer offensive in III Corps was to solidify control over an arc of territory north and east of Saigon that would cut it off from II Corps. The most important targets were Binh Long and Phuoc Long provinces. Remote and sparsely populated, they served as strategic crossroads linking Cambodian sanctuaries with War Zones C and D, and VC forces in III and IV Corps with those in the Central Highlands. The B–2 Front had massed three infantry regiments to kick off the summer offensive in III Corps—the veteran 271st (aka 1st) and 272nd (aka 2nd) VC Regiments and the newly raised 273rd (aka 3rd) Regiment. On 11 May the VC overran Song Be, the capital city of Phước Long Province, about 60 miles (97 km) north of Saigon. The town was recaptured the next day by the ARVN with US air support. The battle resulted in 297 VC, 58 ARVN and five US killed.

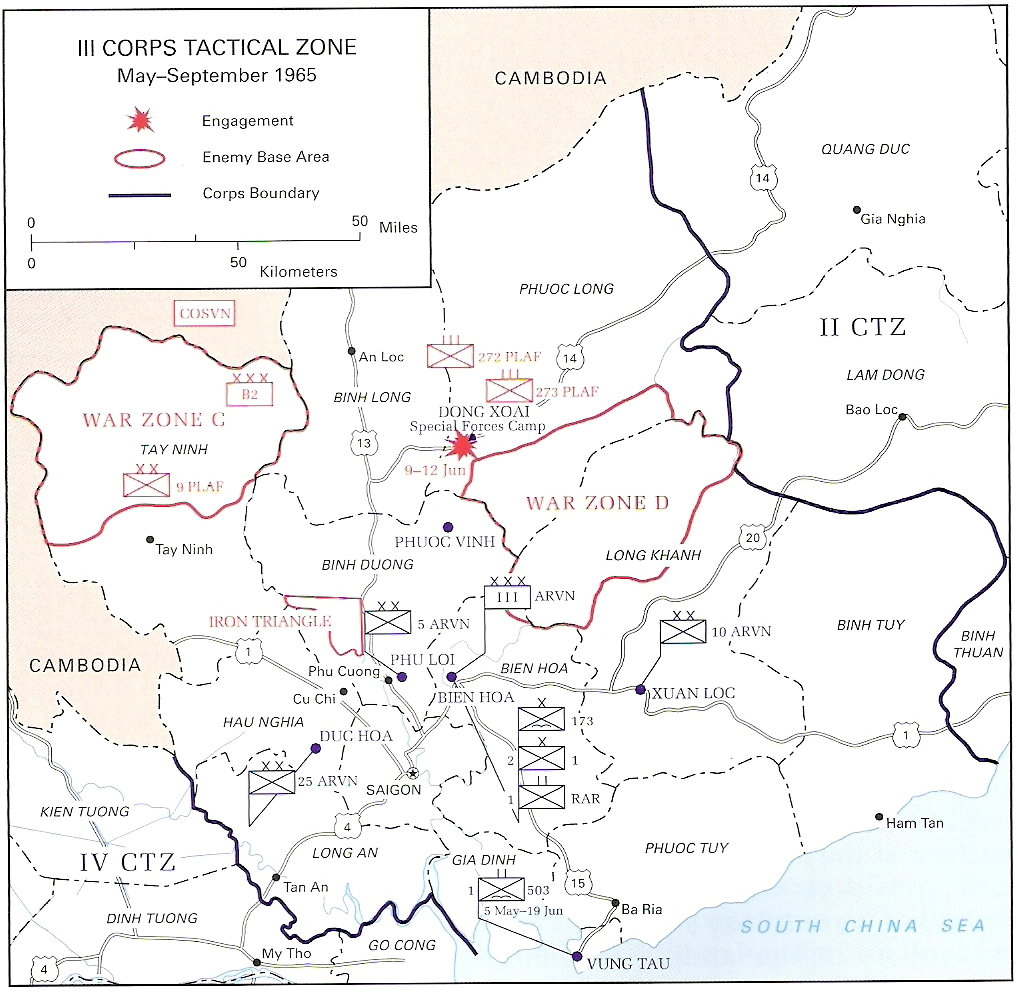
III Corps May to September 1965

On 22 May a VC battalion ambushed two CIDG platoons as they crossed a field after returning from an operation near Bến Cát. The attack killed 54 Strikers and wounded 11, with six soldiers missing and 69 weapons lost. One US advisor was also killed.

On 9 June the VC overran Đồng Xoài in Phuoc Long province, holding the town for five days before withdrawing. The battle resulted in 416 ARVN, 18 US killed and more than 300 VC killed.

On 15 June the first elements of the 1st Battalion, Royal Australian Regiment (1RAR), Australia's first ground combat unit arrived at Tan Son Nhut Air Base and Vung Tau port. They were sent to Bien Hoa Base Camp and attached to the 173rd Airborne Brigade.

On 8 July the VC attacked a small post 2km outside of Dầu Tiếng. The 5th Division hurriedly dispatched the 2nd Battalion, 9th Infantry, without a forward observer or air cover. At 12:10, two VC battalions ambushed the column as it neared the post, killing 103 soldiers (including four Americans) and wounding 26. Another 199 soldiers went missing, with all but 79 eventually returning to the colors.

COSVN's combined military, terror, and political offensive had an adverse impact on pacification. Perhaps in recognition that pacification was impossible in Phuoc Thanh, the home to much of War Zone D, the South Vietnamese dissolved the province, assigning pieces to Binh Duong, Long Khanh, and Bien Hoa.

On 14 July the US 2nd Brigade, 1st Infantry Division (less the 1st Battalion, 18th Infantry Regiment deployed to Cam Ranh Bay) began arriving at Vung Tau. They were then flown to Bien Hoa and stationed 3km southeast of the air base and placed under the operational control of the 173rd Airborne.

From 11 August until early September the 173rd Airborne deployed to II Corps before returning to Bien Hoa. The 1st Infantry Division's 2nd Battalion, 18th Infantry Regiment took over security of Bien Hoa in their absence. During September and October the 173rd together with the 5th Division provided security for units of the US 1st Infantry Division while they moved into base camps near Saigon.

On 29 September the 1st Battalion, 18th Infantry arrived from Cam Ranh Bay to rejoin the rest of its regiment at Bien Hoa.

On 1 October the rest of the US 1st Infantry Division began arriving on troopships at Vung Tau.

On 4 October, the 2nd Brigade, 1st Infantry Division began securing and clearing and area at Phước Vĩnh for the 1st Brigade, 1st Infantry Division. The 1st Brigade moved into the camp between the 22nd and 24th of October and the 2nd Brigade returned to Bien Hoa on the 25th. The 1st Infantry Division headquarters was established at Dĩ An Base Camp in late October.

From 5-8 November the US 1st Battalion, 503rd Infantry Regiment and 1RAR conducted Operation Hump against the VC in War Zone D.

On 12 November the US 2nd Battalion, 2nd Infantry Regiment fought elements of the VC 272nd and 273rd Regiments in the Battle of Ap Bau Bang.

On the evening of 27 November the 7th Regiment, 5th Division operating in the Michelin Rubber Plantation was overrun by the VC 271st and 273rd Regiments, killing most of the Regiment (possibly up to 500 soldiers) and its five US advisers. In response the US 3rd Brigade, 1st Infantry Division was ordered to rescue the shattered 7th Regiment and launched Operation Bushmaster II from 1-6 December.

In late December the first elements of the US 2nd Brigade, 25th Infantry Division began arriving in Vietnam and were deployed to Cu Chi where they established the Cu Chi Base Camp.

Vien showed little interest in the pacification campaign. Westmoreland reported that many Corps' units had "pulled into defensive positions with the resultant lack of aggressiveness in saturation patrolling and the limiting of night activities to manning fixed positions." All three ARVN divisions had higher than average desertion rates. In late September Viên was promoted to command the JGS and was replaced as Corps' commander by General Nguyễn Bảo Trị who was unable to rectify the situation. Westmoreland viewed Colonel Phan Trọng Chinh's leadership of the 25th Infantry Division as uninspired. The 5th Infantry Division was equally poor, with commander, General Phạm Quốc Thuần, having recently gone to pieces when his 7th Regiment had been badly mauled in the Michelin Rubber Plantation, and the unit was notorious for its high desertion rate and low morale. In the new 10th Infantry Division American advisers regarded the "moody and vacillatory" General Lữ Mộng Lan as "a marginal commander who would have to be worked with."

In the Combined Campaign Plan for 1966, which the JGS and MACV issued in December, the allies declared their "basic objective" for the year to be clearing, securing, and developing the heavily populated regions around Saigon, in the Mekong Delta, and in selected portions of the I and II Corps coastal plain. "Coincident" with this effort, they would defend significant outlying government and population centers and conduct search and destroy operations against "major VC/PAVN forces." In pursuit of these objectives, South Vietnamese forces would concentrate on defending, clearing, and securing the designated strategic areas. American and third-country forces, besides securing their own bases and helping to protect rice-producing areas, were to "conduct operations outside of the secure areas against VC forces and bases." Implicit in these words was the defacto division of labor between the South Vietnamese and Americans that had been in effect since the summer.

=== 1966 ===
The 173rd Airborne Brigade and 1RAR conducted Operation Marauder in the Plain of Reeds from 1-6 January.

From 8-14 January the 1st Infantry Division and 1RAR conducted Operation Crimp in the Ho Bo Woods.

From 21-25 February the 1st Infantry Division conducted Operation Mastiff in the Dầu Tiếng District.

On 23/4 February the 1st Brigade, 1st Infantry Division and 1RAR fought off a regimental-sized VC night attack in the Battle of Suoi Bong Trang near Tan Binh, in central Binh Duong province.

From 3-8 March the 3rd Brigade, 1st Infantry Division conducted Operation Cocoa Beach along Highway 13 near Lai Khê.

From 7-23 March the 1st Brigade, 1st Infantry Division and the 173rd Airborne Brigade conducted Operation Silver City in Bien Hoa province.

On 15 March Westmoreland established II Field Force, Vietnam, at Bien Hoa, a corps-level headquarters responsible for coordinating the US ground war throughout III Corps.

In March the 2nd Brigade, 1st Infantry Division moved from Bien Hoa to its new Bearcat Base.

From 26 March to 6 April the US 1st Battalion, 5th Marines and two Vietnamese Marine battalions conducted Operation Jackstay in the Rung Sat Special Zone.

In early 1966 the South Vietnamese government was assessed to control only ten out of 131 hamlets in Hau Nghia province. The province was strategically significant being used by the VC to link their forces in the Mekong Delta with their command-and-control and logistical bases in Tay Ninh province and Cambodia. Hau Nghia also provided a major avenue of approach to Saigon along Highway 1, which ran from Saigon to the VC sanctuaries on the Cambodian border. To keep pressure on the capital, the B2 Front's Military Region 4 maintained several strongholds in the province. The most important of these were the Plain of Reeds that comprised the western half of Hau Nghia province, and the Boi Loi Woods, the Ho Bo Woods, and the Filhol Rubber Plantation, a succession of heavily forested areas that ran along the province's northern border. The people were openly hostile to ARVN troops and their US advisers, and travel on all but the main roads was hazardous day or night. The 25th Division was one of the worst in the ARVN, poorly trained, ill led, and demoralized. The troops never ventured far from their bases and the major roads that linked them, in part because Premier Ky had ordered the division to keep the vast majority of its men in their barracks at all times so that they could return to Saigon at a moment's notice to thwart attempted coups. The arrival of substantial US forces in the Corps would allow offensive operations against such sanctuary areas.

From 29 March to 7 April the US 25th Division conducted Operation Circle Pines in the Filhol Rubber Plantation resulting in 170 VC killed for US losses of 30 killed and 195 wounded.

From 29 March to 15 April the 1st Infantry Division and 1RAR conducted Operation Abilene in Phước Tuy province, which culminated in the Battle of Xã Cẩm Mỹ on 11-12 April.

From 24 April to 17 May the 1st Infantry Division conducted Operation Birmingham against the VC 9th Division in War Zone C.

In late April the US 1st Brigade, 25th Infantry Division arrived in Vietnam and it joined the 2nd Brigade at Cu Chi.

From 27 April to 12 May the 1st Battalion, 27th Infantry conducted Operation Maili with the 49th Regiment, 25th Division in Bao Trai in Hau Nghia province.

In 1966 the two worst units in the ARVN were still the 5th and 25th Infantry Divisions, both guarding the approaches to Saigon. Here the brunt of the fighting had been assumed by American combat units, the US 1st and 25th Infantry Divisions and three separate brigades. Under their protection, the ARVN performed static security missions. But rather than using this respite to regroup and retrain their forces, or to hunt down the local VC, the Vietnamese commanders had let their units degenerate through inactivity, and American advisers now rated them lower than even the neighboring territorials. In early May Westmoreland ordered the US 1st and 25th Divisions to "start working more closely with elements of these two divisions on operations in order to improve their morale, efficiency and effectiveness." He suggested a "buddy" effort, matching the US 1st and the ARVN 5th Divisions; the US 25th and the ARVN 25th Divisions; and the US 173d Airborne Brigade and the 1st Australian Task Force with the ARVN 10th Division. JGS Chairman General Viên agreed and Westmoreland asked General Jonathan O. Seaman, the II Field Force, Vietnam commander, to get together with his counterpart, III Corps commander Trị, to implement the buddy program.

From 1-18 May the 1st Brigade, 101st Airborne Division and the 173rd Airborne Brigade conducted Operation Austin IV in western Quang Duc and Phước Long provinces.

In mid-May the commander of the US 25th Division, Major general Frederick C. Weyand, started a series of combined operations with South Vietnamese regular and territorial forces in Hau Nghia province; tasked his subordinate brigade commanders to assist the three infantry regiments of the ARVN 25th Division in constructing housing for military dependents; and sponsored a propaganda program entitled "The Brotherhood of the 25th Division," which he dedicated to the "fight for freedom against the communists." In neighboring Binh Duong province the new commander of the US 1st Division, General William E. DePuy, began a similar effort, with one of his three brigades supporting the 5th Division. Initially each unit contributed one infantry battalion to the project. Combined activities consisted of small unit patrolling, village seals and searches, propaganda campaigns, intelligence collection efforts, and various civic improvement projects. In July, however, with the bulk of his units engaged in heavy fighting north of Saigon, DePuy had to abandon the combined operations task force concept. Thereafter, he monitored and supported the 5th Division's activities in Binh Duong through the Division's 2nd Brigade headquarters, only occasionally assigning ground units to the effort. Westmoreland enthusiastically applauded these endeavors, especially Weyand's propaganda program, and both he and Seaman claimed major improvements for the participating South Vietnamese units.

From 16 May to 8 June the 503rd Infantry Regiment, 1RAR and the 5th Battalion, Royal Australian Regiment (5RAR) conducted Operation Hardihood to secure the area around Nui Dat for the establishment of a base area for the 1st Australian Task Force (1 ATF).

From 16-30 May the US 25th Infantry Division conducted Operation Wahiawa in Hậu Nghĩa province.

From 19 May to 13 July the 3rd Brigade, 1st Infantry Division and the 5th Division conducted Operation El Paso in Binh Long province.

In May the Bien Hoa prisoner of war camp opened.

From 3 June to 3 July the 2nd Battalion, 14th Infantry, conducted Operation Fort Smith in Trang Bang district.

As from 7 June the CMD became a subordinate command of III Corps.

On 9 June General Lê Nguyên Khang was appointed as Corps' commander.

From 13 June to 4 July the 1st Battalion, 27th Infantry conducted Operation Santa Fe in Đức Hòa district. From 13 June to 14 July the 2nd Battalion, 27th Infantry conducted Operation Fresno west of Bao Trai.

On 9 July a VC force attacked a 1st Infantry Division column in the Battle of Minh Thanh Road near An Lộc.

From 22 July to 6 August, the 2nd Brigade, 25th Infantry Division conducted Operation Kokohead targeting VC bases east of the Saigon River.

On 14 August the 196th Light Infantry Brigade began arriving at Vung Tau and was immediately deployed to Tây Ninh Combat Base under the command of the US 25th Infantry Division.

On 18 August 1ATF forces defeated a VC force in the Battle of Long Tan.

From 23-31 August the 1st Brigade, 1st Infantry Division conducted Operation Amarillo in Bình Dương province.

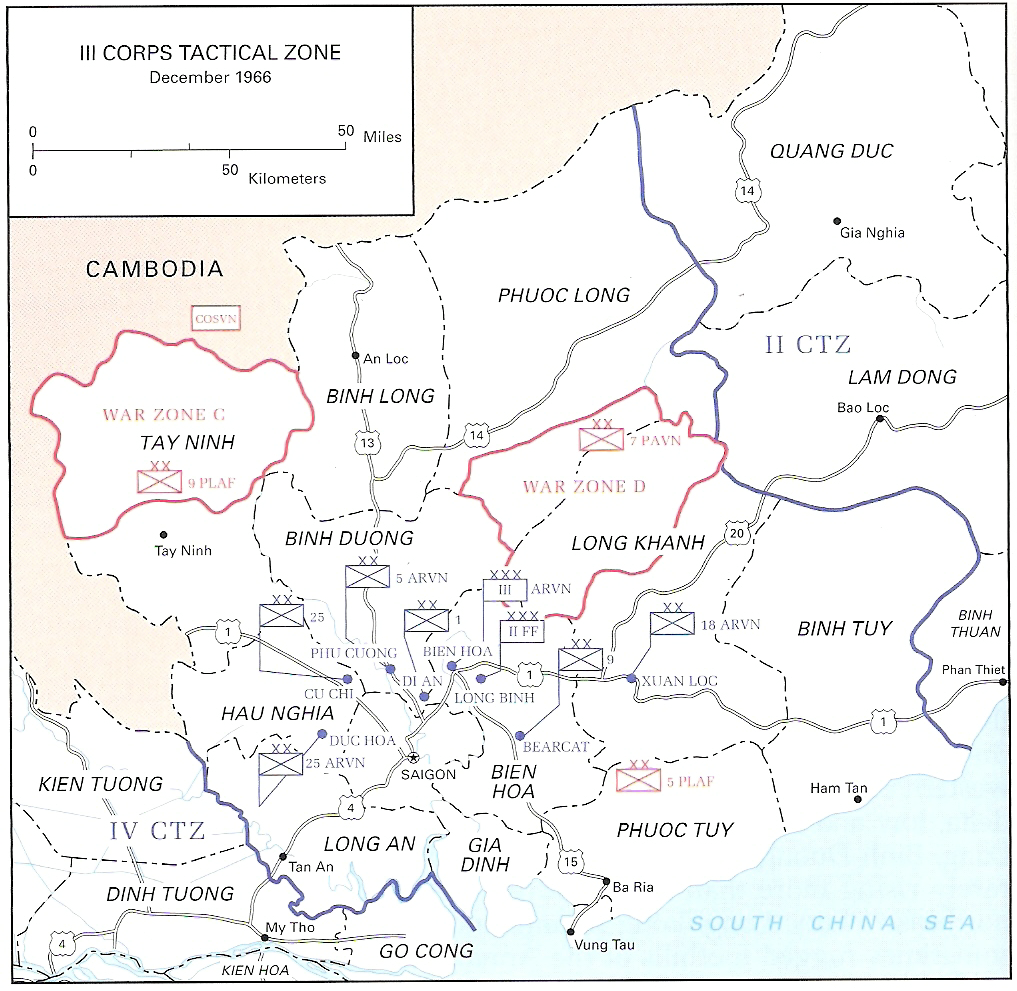
III Corps in December 1966

In August the US embassy reported that the government had gained control over 53% of Hau Nghia's population, up from only 20% at the start of the year.

From 2 September to 11 October the 2nd Brigade, 25th Infantry Division conducted Operation Sunset Beach in Hậu Nghĩa province, southeastern Tây Ninh province and southwestern Bình Dương province.

On 7 September the US 11th Armored Cavalry Regiment arrived at Vung Tau.

On 14 September the 196th Light Infantry Brigade commenced Operation Attleboro, which grew to a Corps' operation before concluding on 25 November.

From 14 September to 13 February 1967 the 1st Brigade, 25th Infantry Division conducted Operation Lanikai, a pacification operation in Long An province.

From 17 September to 14 November the 4th Battalion, 23rd Infantry and a battalion of the 7th Regiment, 5th Division conducted Operation Kahili in the Filhol Plantation, claiming 37 VC killed.

From 20 September to 4 October the 2nd Battalion, 14th Infantry conducted Operation Kamuela in the western Boi Loi Woods.

In September the US senior adviser in Hau Nghia province openly doubted whether the revolutionary development cadres had truly achieved the claimed 75% of their goals, noting that the cadres never stayed overnight in their assigned hamlets and were doing little to improve hamlet security or win popular support for the government.

In September the Philippine Civic Action Group arrived in Vietnam and was placed under the control of the 196th Light Infantry Brigade at Tây Ninh Combat Base.

From 14 October to 14 November the 2nd Brigade, 25th Infantry Division and the 49th Regiment, 25th Division conducted Operation Kailua in Hậu Nghĩa province, claiming 67 VC killed.

In November Westmoreland proposed a joint US/ARVN security operation to Viên to pair US and ARVN battalions to conduct security operations in Bình Chánh, Nhà Bè and Thủ Đức districts in Gia Dinh province around Saigon. Operation Fairfax would commence in December.

Also in November MACV and the JGS released their new combined campaign plan. It reflected the division of labor already in effect. The plan divided South Vietnam into three mission-oriented areas. Critical were those designated as "National Priority Areas" and "Areas of Priority for Military Offensive Operations." The remainder constituted a mix of sparsely inhabited regions of less military consequence or areas where weather, terrain, or troop strength limited allied effectiveness, such as those opposite the DMZ or along the Laotian border. The two priority categories comprised about half of South Vietnam and included about 77% of its population, 85% of its food production, and 75% of its roads. According to MACV, these areas also contained 77% of the enemy's conventional units and 43% of his bases Ostensibly, South Vietnamese forces would have primary responsibility for providing security in the National Priority Areas-heavily populated zones with reasonably good road and water networks. For this mission, all ARVN regular infantry battalions were to receive special revolutionary development, or pacification, training during 1966 and 1967, and at least half were to be assigned direct pacification support or security missions as soon as possible. Meanwhile, the more mobile American forces would take the fight to the enemy in the less accessible Areas of Priority for Military Offensive Operations. Only in IV Corps were both securing and offensive missions given to South Vietnamese commanders. While the South Vietnamese would pursue a strategy of pacification, US forces would follow one of attrition.

In December the 199th Light Infantry Brigade arrived in Vietnam and was deployed to Sông Bé Base Camp. Also in December the first elements of the 9th Infantry Division arrived in Vietnam and were deployed to Bearcat Base.

=== 1967 ===
From 8 to 26 January US and ARVN forces conducted Operation Cedar Falls to eradicate the VC base area known as the Iron Triangle.

From 2 to 21 February the US 25th Infantry Division conducted Operation Gadsden in Tay Ninh province.

From 7 February to 31 March 1968 the 2nd and 3rd Brigades, 1st Infantry Division and 5th Division, 18th Division and VNMC 3rd Battalion conducted Operation Lam Son 67, security operations in Biên Hòa and Bình Dương provinces.

From 13 February to 11 March 1968 the 3rd Brigade, 9th Infantry Division and Regional and Popular Forces conducted Operation Enterprise in Long An Province.

From 22 February to 14 May US forces conducted Operation Junction City against War Zone C.

In March MACV ordered the 3rd Brigade, 9th Infantry Division to deploy to Long An province and they established their base at Tân An.

From 23 April to 7 June US forces conducted Operation Manhattan in the Ho Bo Woods/Bến Củi area.

In mid-April the 196th Light Infantry Brigade redeployed to southern I Corps to join Task Force Oregon. Their tactical area of responsibility was assumed by the 3rd Brigade, 25th Infantry Division which took over Tây Ninh Combat Base.

Weyand, now commanding II Field Force, cultivated his relationship with Khang through weekly meetings. He bypassed the three incompetent division commanders by having American combat units work directly with South Vietnamese regiments, battalions, and territorials, thus repeating on a larger scale what he had done the year before as commander of the US 25th Infantry Division. Weyand also began a six-week training program for ARVN infantry and ranger battalions, which he hoped to extend to South Vietnamese engineer, signal, armor, and artillery units by the end of the year.

In April the JGS charged that ARVN units performing security duties in Operation Fairfax were helping local authorities and absentee landlords collect retroactive land rents and taxes from peasant tenants in formerly insecure areas. Viên and his chief of staff, Nguyen Van Vy, termed the practice illegal, if only because the owners themselves had paid no taxes for the period concerned. But the ramifications were obviously much deeper. If the practice was indeed widespread the Vietnamese farmers must have seen the returning government troops as oppressors, rather than liberators, and the Saigon regime that they represented as only concerned with the interests of a privileged minority. The entire concept of employing regular troops in this manner was thus open to question, and may explain why it was so easy for the VC to move men and supplies into the Saigon area for a major offensive scheduled for early 1968.

Early on 14 May the VC entered the compound of the ARVN 2nd Battalion, 50th Infantry, 25th Division, through two gates that someone from inside had opened. The VC quickly overran the compound and early in the fight jammed the American adviser's radio with voice transmissions, preventing him from calling for help. Within two hours, the VC had killed 31 and wounded 34 and then fled with 68 weapons, losing only three killed.

From 14 May to 7 December the 2nd Brigade, 25th Infantry Division conducted Operation Kole Kole in Hậu Nghĩa and Tây Ninh provinces.

From 18 May to 7 December the 1st Brigade, 25th Infantry Division conducted Operation Barking Sands in Hậu Nghĩa and Bình Dương provinces.

From 9 to 29 June the 1st Brigade, 9th Infantry Division and the 1st & 3rd Squadrons, 11th Armored Cavalry Regiment and Rangers and 18th Division elements conducted Operation Akron against the VC Base Area 301 in Hát Dịch.

From 12 to 26 June the 3rd Brigade, 1st Infantry Division conducted Operation Billings, a preemptive attack on the VC 271st Regiment, 9th Division north of Phước Vĩnh.

On 10 July a company of the 9th Regiment, 5th Division at Xa Tan Hung, 5km southeast of Quan Loi defeated an attack by the PAVN 141st Regiment killing 144 and capturing 18 together with 67 weapons for the loss of 15 killed.

From 11 July to 31 October the 3rd Brigade, 25th Infantry Division conducted Operation Diamond Head in Tây Ninh province.

On 7 August the PAVN 1965th Regiment unsuccessfully tried to overrun Tonle Cham Camp losing 152 killed and 60 weapons, while the defenders lost 26 killed.

From 4 to 18 August the Mobile Riverine Force (MRF) conducted Operation Coronado III in the Rung Sat.

From 19 August to 9 September the MRF conducted Operation Coronado IV in Long An, Gò Công and Kiến Hòa provinces.

From 15 September to 10 November the 1st Brigade, 25th Infantry Division conducted Operation Kunia to eliminate VC base areas in the Ho Bo Woods.

From 29 September to 19 November the 1st Infantry Division conducted Operation Shenandoah II along Highway 13.

In October MACV and South Vietnamese commands finalized plans for the upcoming year. Although pacification activities occurred in every province in South Vietnam, the Combined Campaign Plan for 1968 (AB 143) continued the previous year's program of concentrating resources on 26 of South Vietnam's 44 provinces. Omitted were areas where the enemy's military forces were strongest—such as the northernmost and southernmost reaches of the country—or that were remote and sparsely populated. The 1968 plan called for the greatest effort to be made in areas close to Saigon, with the rest of the country receiving progressively fewer resources the farther north or south one traveled from that location. The MACV and Vietnamese staffs further decided that for 1968 they would focus the pacification effort on two types of areas. First, they wished to solidify control over areas in which the South Vietnamese government already held some sway. Second, they wanted to target areas where a significant number of people could be added to the rolls of those living under government authority without expanding allied resources over a large physical area. Military plans reflected the pacification design. The 1968 Campaign Plan designated most of the pacification priority provinces as priority areas for offensive military operations. Other areas targeted for offensive action were the border areas northwest of Saigon—Tay Ninh, Binh Long, Phuoc Long, and Quang Duc provinces—which also acted as important bases and conduits for enemy forces. Disrupting the enemy in these areas would both shield pacification efforts in the more populated areas and pave the way for geographical expansion in the future. Since the areas the allies planned to target in 1968 were similar to those of 1967, little movement of forces was needed to execute the AB 143 plan. Four US Army divisions formed a defensive ring around Saigon.

On 29 October the VC 9th Division attacked Loc Ninh but were beaten by US 1st Infantry Division and ARVN Rangers, Regional and CIDG forces.

From 3 November to 5 January 1968 the 1st Brigade, 9th Infantry Division, 1ATF and the 18th Division conducted Operation Santa Fe against the May Tao Secret Zone.

From 18 November to 23 December the 2nd and 3rd Brigades, 25th Infantry Division and the 5th Division conducted Operation Atlanta II in the Iron Triangle.

From 4 December to 17 February 1968 the 199th Infantry Brigade conducted Operation Manchester in Tân Uyên district.

On 5 December the VC massacred 252 civilians in Đắk Sơn village, Phước Long province.

In early December the 2nd and 3rd Brigades of the 101st Airborne Division began arriving by airlift to South Vietnam. The 3rd Brigade moved to Phước Vĩnh Base Camp, while the 2nd Brigade, which arrived in the third week of December, moved in temporarily at Cu Chi Base Camp.

From 8 December to 24 February 1968 the 1st and 3rd Brigades, 25th Infantry Division conducted Operation Yellowstone in northeast Tây Ninh province.

From 8 December to 11 March 1968 the 2nd Brigade, 25th Infantry Division conducted Operation Saratoga in northeastern Hậu Nghĩa, southern Tây Ninh and western Bình Dương provinces.

On 31 December the 11th Armored Cavalry Regiment completed its move to Loc Ninh which had begun in early December.

By the end of 1967 US Civil Operations and Revolutionary Development Support (CORDS) advisors reported that poor leadership at all levels and the lack of coordination between the various commands. At times CORDS advisers reported that regular and territorial units were entrenched side by side, protecting the same hamlet. In other instances security tasked battalions failed to even make a gesture at providing hamlet security, and CORDS coordinator Robert Komer himself accused several battalion commanders in the 18th Division of using the new mission as an excuse to withdraw from all meaningful operations, except to provide for their own self-protection.

=== 1968 ===
At the beginning of 1968, Weyand had accomplished most of the military goals he had hoped to achieve in the National Priority Area during the first phase of the dry season campaign. His forces had whittled down the Iron Triangle and several other base areas on the Saigon River and had strengthened the anti-rocket barrier around Bien Hoa–Long Binh. They had also been fairly successful in discouraging the enemy from conducting major attacks in populated areas. Finally, road security efforts had enabled him to sustain the troops he had sent toward the Cambodian border. Meanwhile, South Vietnamese authorities and their US advisers had continued to push forward on the pacification front. The Revolutionary Development program appeared to be gaining momentum. The number of Revolutionary Development teams in the Corps stood at around 100 and was set to grow by another 30 in the next few months. Khang had assigned roughly half of his regular ARVN units to support Revolutionary Development, and security was improving in many pacification areas. In addition, 51 of the 53 districts in III Corps now had a functioning combined intelligence center, an important step toward energizing the new counter VC infrastructure effort that the allies had inaugurated under the name Phuong Hoang, or Phoenix. Though the program was still in its infancy, by year’s end the district intelligence centers had already identified nearly 5,000 VC cadre, with allied forces eliminating 200 of them in October and November alone. Small-scale attacks and harassment activities continued and could occur almost anywhere, but overall allied officials believed that conditions in III Corps were slowly improving.

Despite allied security and counter-infrastructure efforts, VC guerrillas could still harass civilians and outposts over most of III Corps. During 1967, the VC had committed over 4,000 acts of terrorism in the Corps, specifically targeting for execution 631 individuals and kidnapping another 614. Other acts, such as throwing grenades into crowds, placing bombs in public areas, and conducting indiscriminate shootings, had killed or injured over 2,300 Vietnamese, and by year's end the rate of VC terrorist actions in the Corps was on the rise. Meanwhile, the enemy’s base camps along the Saigon River, diminished as they were, continued to harbor main force units capable of doing great harm.

From 24 January to 1 March, 1ATF conducted Operation Coburg near Trảng Bom in Bien Hoa province.

At 02:45 on 30 January the PAVN/VC began their Tet Offensive attacks in Saigon with a VC sapper attack on the Independence Palace. The VC failed to gain entry to the palace grounds and retreated to a nearby building where they held out until they exhausted their ammunition. Less than 30 minutes later the VC attacked the US embassy gaining access to the grounds, before being wiped out by the morning. A simultaneous attack on the RVNN Headquarters at the Saigon Naval Shipyard was easily repulsed. A VC unit seized the Saigon radio station, but their attempts to broadcast a propaganda message was thwarted by the line to the transmitter station being cut off. The 3rd Di An Battalion which was supposed to reinforce the VC in the city was halted by South Vietnamese police at a bridge over the Nhi The River northeast of the city and then forced to retreat by the 30th Ranger Battalion. Airborne troops supported by M41 tanks then cleared the VC at the radio station by mid-morning.

At 03:00 on 30 January the PAVN/VC attacked targets in Cholon, but were forced out of their base at Phú Thọ Racetrack on the 31st and then out of Cholon by 11 February. At about the same time, the PAVN/VC unsuccessfully attacked the JGS Compound.

At 00:30 on 31 January the PAVN/VC began their attacks on Bien Hoa Air Base and Long Binh Post. The attacks were repulsed by 2 February with the PAVN/VC losing 527 killed.

At 03:20 on 31 January the PAVN/VC attacked Tan Son Nhut Air Base, gaining access to the western end of the base where they were stopped by USAF and ARVN security forces. At dawn the US and ARVN forces, reinforced by the 3rd Squadron, 4th Cavalry Regiment and the 8th Airborne Battalion, counterattacked and by 13:00 the battle was over with 669 PAVN/VC killed and 26 captured for the loss of 22 US and 29 ARVN killed.

On the morning of 1 February the D445 Local Force Battalion and the C610 Local Force Company attacked Ba Ria, but were held back by the 3rd Battalion, 52nd Infantry, and some Regional Forces which were later reinforced by the 11th Airborne Battalion and later by elements of 1ATF and the 18th Division. VC losses were over 300 killed.

The Tet offensive had severely damaged pacification in Saigon and in the neighboring provinces of Hau Nghia, Binh Duong, and Gia Dinh. Progress had also come to a standstill in Phuoc Long and Binh Long Provinces due to the withdrawal of allied forces to more populous areas. Pacification sustained moderate to minor setbacks in the provinces east of Saigon, while to the west, Tay Ninh, a stronghold of the anti-Communist Cao Dai sect, emerged unscathed. Long An Province suffered because most of the local VC had marched on Saigon.

From 11 March to 7 April ARVN and US forces conducted Operation Quyet Thang to reestablish South Vietnamese control over the areas immediately around Saigon.

From 8 April to 31 May ARVN, US, 1ATF and Thai forces conducted Operation Toan Thang I, a counteroffensive involving nearly every combat unit in the Corps to pursue PAVN/VC forces.

The May Offensive attacks on Saigon began at 04:00 on 5 May with the VC 4th Thu Duc Battalion and the PAVN 2nd Battalion, 274th Regiment attacking the Newport Bridge, but this was repulsed by the 5th Marine Battalion. At 05:00 elements from the 1st and 3rd Battalions of the Dong Nai Regiment attacked the Binh Loi Bridge, where Highway 1 crossed the Saigon River, approximately 2km northwest of the Newport Bridge. The 6th Marine Battalion repulsed the attack killing 54 PAVN/VC and five capturing five. From 5-12 May the PAVN/VC unsuccessfully attacked west and south achieving little and suffering severe losses.

From 12 May to 6 June 1ATF fought the Battle of Coral–Balmoral against the PAVN 7th Division north of Tân Uyên.

On the night of 24–25 May the PAVN/VC began their second phase of May offensive attacks. The attacks achieved little and cost the PAVN/VC an estimated 600 killed and another 107 captured, while the South Vietnamese lost 42 killed.

In early June 1968 Khang resigned his Corps' command after misplaced US helicopter rocket fire killed several Kỳ supporters observing fighting in Saigon on 2 June. Thiệu replaced him with General Đỗ Cao Trí.

In June, the US 3rd Brigade, 9th Infantry Division left Long An province for Dong Tam Base Camp where it joined the Mobile Riverine Force. In July the 9th Division headquarters moved to Dong Tam.

On 17 August the PAVN/VC began their Phase III offensive with an attack on Tây Ninh. The attack was repulsed by 27 August. A renewed attack began on 11 September with sporadic attacks continuing until 27 September.

On 19 August the PAVN 7th Division attacked the Lộc Ninh Special Forces Camp with combat continuing until 25 August. A renewed attack began on 11 September and continued until 14 September.

By September US advisors were pleased by Trí's aggressiveness as the new commander, but noted he had been mounting operations across the Cambodian border against retreating PAVN/VC forces risking an international incident with nominally neutral Cambodia. However the 18th Division was a "laughing stock" even to the Vietnamese and the 5th Division had "withdrawn into a shell" and was doing nothing constructive."

=== 1969 ===
In early 1969, Corps' senior advisor General Walter T. Kerwin Jr. wrote that he saw "no marked improvement" during 1968 in two of the three South Vietnamese divisions and rated one-third of the South Vietnamese maneuver battalions in the zone as "effective," one-third as "ineffective," and the remaining one-third as "unsatisfactory." Taken as a whole," he concluded, "ARVN units are much less effective than similar US units and achieve minimal results." He did note, however, "substantial" improvement in the Territorial Forces caused by better weapons, logistics, and administration, and the assistance provided by US mobile advisory teams.

On 16 April Abrams informed II Field Force commander General Julian Ewell that he could expect no further US reinforcements and would somehow have to get the three ARVN divisions moving "despite their commanders." Impressed with the success of combined operations in the I Corps, Ewell decided to sponsor a similar program in III Corps. Drawing on his experiences in the US 9th Division, he believed that successful counterinsurgency operations were predicated on the availability of helicopter support. However, simply attaching American aviation units to Vietnamese units was an unsatisfactory proposition, because the principal Vietnamese commanders and staffs lacked the experience and, in his opinion, the will to effectively employ such expensive resources. Instead, he wanted each major Vietnamese unit in the zone married to a similar American force that would funnel the necessary aviation, artillery, and communications support needed to put the Vietnamese ground combat forces back on their feet again. On 22 June he formally announced his intention to "buddy up US and ARVN units to conduct combined operations [that would]... maximize the effectiveness of both forces [and] achieve in 2, 3, or 4 months a quantum jump in ARVN and RF/PF performance." On the 26th Ewell and Tri jointly proclaimed the new Dong Tien ("Progress Together") Program, calling for the "close and continuous association of [American and South Vietnamese] units... to effect a significant increase in the efficiency of utilizing critical combat support elements, particularly [US] Army aviation assets." The official objective of Dong Tien was training "ARVN and US forces which can take over the complete responsibility for an area [of the other] on short notice." The program was to commence on 1 July 1969 and encompass the entire Corps.

Ewell moved almost all of his combat units out of the Saigon area and turned over the defense of the capital to the Vietnamese. He transformed the US Capital Military Assistance Command, a small tactical headquarters in Saigon, into an advisory organization for the Capital Military District, and charged it with transferring local American sensor and ground radar installations to the South Vietnamese. Ewell also relieved the US Bien Hoa Tactical Area Command, east of Saigon, of its tactical responsibilities and fashioned it into an advisory and liaison agency to the South Vietnamese Long Binh Special Zone headquarters, a local area command.

The main Dong Tien operations began almost immediately. East of Saigon, the US 199th Light Infantry Brigade moved to Xuan Loc, headquarters of the 18th Division, and began a series of combined operations with what was still considered one of the worst units in South Vietnam. To the west, in marshy Long An Province, the US 3rd Brigade, 9th Infantry Division, began a similar effort with elements of the 46th and 50th Regiments of the 25th Infantry Division. Northwest of Saigon, the US 25th Infantry Division attempted to massage some life into the rest of the 25th Division. In mid-1969 an entire US brigade moved south to the Cu Chi area to work with the 49th and 50th Regiments. In Hau Nghia, most of the Dong Tien units directed their combat efforts against enemy units of Sub-Region 1 in the upper Saigon River area.

The most important Dong Tien operation took place directly above Saigon between the 5th Division and the US 1st Infantry Division. Infantry battalions of the 5th Division's 7th Regiment worked extensively with those of the US 1st Division's 2nd Brigade in central Binh Duong province, while similar units of the 5th Division's 8th Regiment operated with battalions of the 1st Division's 1st and 3rd Brigades in the northern Binh Duong jungles.

In August Trí replaced Phạm Quốc Thuần, commander of the 5th Division with Nguyễn Văn Hiếu and Đỗ Kế Giai, commander of the 18th Division with Lam Quang Tho. While US advisers were glad to see them leave, neither of the incoming commanders were regarded as dynamic leaders.

In October the Dong Tien forces established an integrated fire support base in the "Citadel" region east of Cu Chi, and in February 1970 the ARVN assumed area responsibility for most of northern Hau Nghia Province, including traditional enemy base areas like the Ho Bo and Boi Loi Woods.

In October and November representatives of II Field Force and III Corps agreed the ground rules for the US 1st Cavalry Division-Vietnamese Airborne Dong Tien operation. Almost immediately the 2nd Airborne Brigade moved into War Zone C for combined operations with the Cavalry division's 1st Brigade. Operating from Tay Ninh city, the two brigade commanders opened fire support bases across War Zone C for the three participating airborne battalions. Each airborne battalion had its own area of operation and, supported by helicopters of the US 11th Combat Aviation Group, constantly patrolled their jungle zones. In December the Cavalry's 2nd Brigade began a similar program with the 1st Airborne Brigade east of War Zone C, in the Phuoc Binh border area.

=== 1970 ===
As the US 1st Division began its redeployment, leading to the end of the Dong Tien program in March, Hieu moved his 5th Division headquarters north and, with the help of adjacent American units, gradually took over responsibility for the 1st Division's former operational area without incident.

After several months in the field, Tri rotated other Airborne units through the 1st Cavalry Division's "training area" until the program ended in April. The effort was a mixed success. As in similar programs, American air, communications, and logistical support enabled the Airborne units to run extended operations well beyond their normal supply and support capabilities. However, the airborne force never operated as an entire division. Because the division commander, General Dư Quốc Đống, failed to establish a tactical command post and rarely took to the field, his staff and support units benefited little.

In summary, the Dong Tien Program benefited the participating infantry, Airborne, and territorial tactical units, but did little for their higher commands and staffs, or for their support units. Although easing the transfer of significant territorial and base responsibilities from American to South Vietnamese units, the program did little to reduce Tri's area security responsibilities throughout the zone. As long as American units supplied most of the command and control and the intelligence, logistical, and fire support, Tri found it difficult to force his own divisions and regiments to become more involved in these matters.

=== 1971 ===
On 4 February the Corps launched Operation Toan Thang 1/71 into Cambodia.

On 23 February Trí was killed in a helicopter crash. His replacement was the less aggressive General Nguyễn Văn Minh.

In late May the 5th Division was severely mauled in the Battle of Snuol.

=== 1972 ===
ARVN III Corps in 1971

The Easter Offensive in III Corps began on 4 April with the VC 5th Division attacking Lộc Ninh, defended by the ARVN 9th Infantry Regiment, 5th Division supported by the 1st Cavalry Squadron, 1st Regional Force Battalion and elements of the 74th Ranger Battalion. After three days of fighting, the vastly outnumbered ARVN forces, though well supported by US airpower, were forced to abandon the town.

Meanwhile other PAVN/VC units blocked Highway 13 to prevent a withdrawal from Lộc Ninh to An Lộc and to prevent reinforcement of An Lộc. On 7 April the VC 9th Division attacked Quản Lợi Base Camp, just 3km north of An Lộc. Elements of the ARVN 7th Infantry Regiment defending the area were unable to hold off the VC, so they were ordered to destroy their equipment and join other ARVN units in An Lộc.

Minh dispatched the rest of the 5th Division to hold An Lộc. They were reinforced by two battalions of the Ranger Group (on 7 April) and by two additional infantry battalions (on 10 and 11 April). The 21st Division, which had been stationed in IV Corps, was rushed to Chơn Thành Camp to join a regiment of the 9th Division as a relief force. All forces in the area were placed under the command of Brigadier general Lê Văn Hưng, commander of the 5th Division.

The Battle of An Lộc began on 13 April with the PAVN 9th Division launching tank and infantry attacks on the defenders. The attack was repulsed as was a second assault on 15 April. The PAVN kept the town under constant artillery fire, while US and RVNAF aircraft conducted constant attacks on PAVN forces. On 11 May the PAVN launched a massive all-out infantry and armor attack which was held back by the ARVN and massive US airpower. Further attacks on 12 and 19 May were similarly defeated. On 13/14 June, a regiment of the 18th Division was landed in An Lộc to reinforce the exhausted 5th Division. On 11 July the entire 18th Division arrived to replace the 5th Division. In mid-July the 21st Division was replaced by the 25th Division and it completed the destruction of the remaining PAVN strongpoints blocking Highway 13 by 20 July. The 18th Division would spread out from An Lộc and push the PAVN back, increasing control in the area. On 9 August the 18th Division recaptured Quản Lợi.

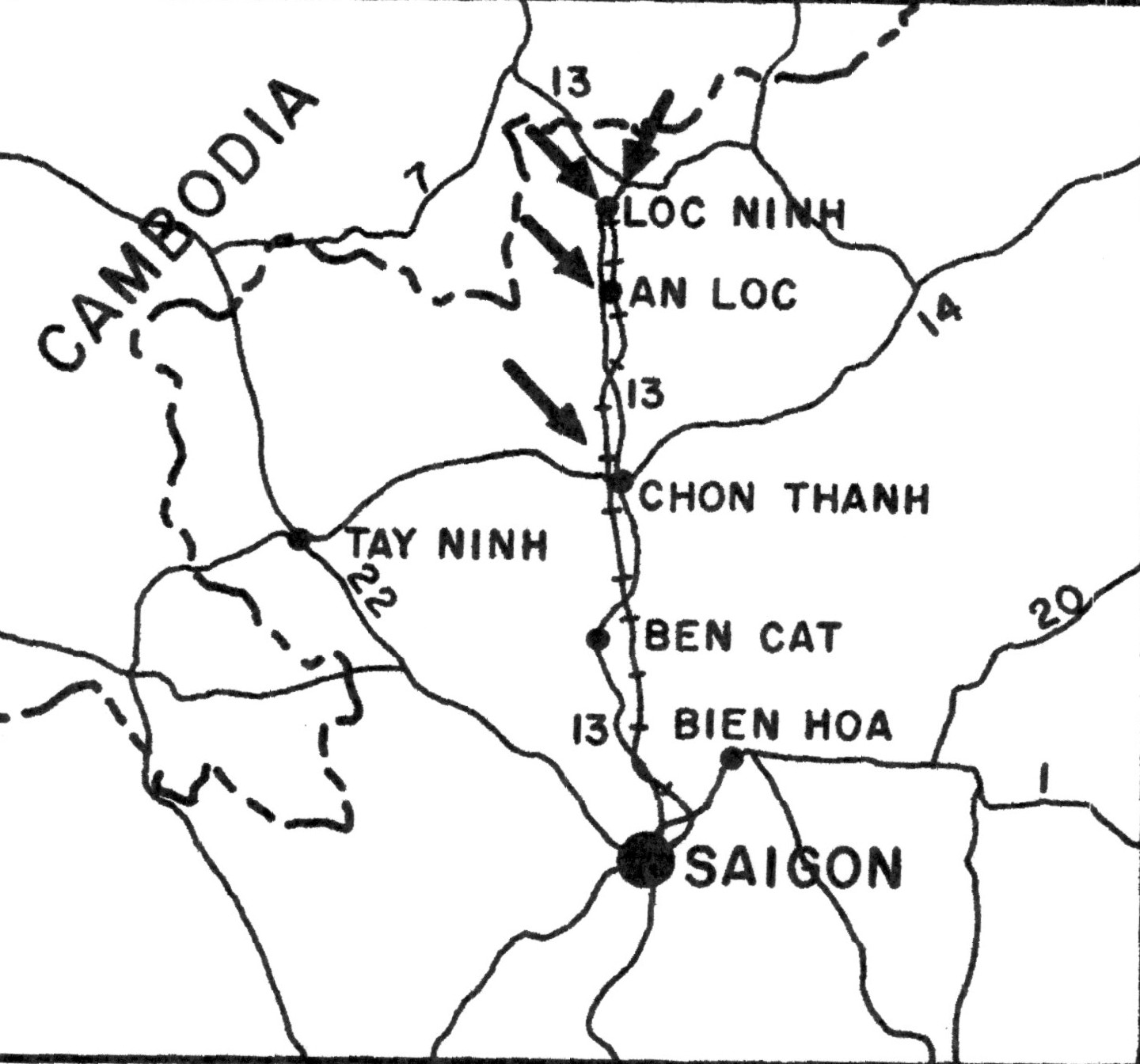
PAVN offensive in ARVN III Corps

Corps' advisers found Minh "wanting" and related that Hung "choked" and "didn't do a damn thing". According to Brigadier general John R. McGiffert II, the Corps' deputy advisor, An Lộc would never have held out without the handful of American advisers directing the air strikes and shoring up the local leadership. Thieu replaced Hưng of the 5th Division with Colonel Tran Quoc Lich and Lâm Quang Thơ of the 18th Division with Colonel Lê Minh Đảo. Minh remained Corps' commander despite continued American insistence that he be replaced.

On 17 May MAG-12 deployed to Bien Hoa Air Base. On 21 May Company K, 3rd Battalion, 9th Marines was deployed to Bien Hoa to provide air base security.

By the end of the year, South Vietnam's line of relatively secure control in MR 3, i.e. bases that could be supported by lines of communication and secured through minor operations, ran from the Cambodian border west of Tay Ninh City, generally east to Dau Tieng on the Saigon River, down to Bau Bang, north of Lai Khe, over to Phuoc Vinh (Phu Giao) on Highway LTL-1A, and along the Song Be and the Dong Nai River to north of Xuân Lộc in Long Khanh province. Highway QL-20 was open from Xuân Lộc to Dalat, but local Route 2 south to Ba Ria in Phuoc Tuy Province was hazardous. Highway 1 was open to Nha Trang.

=== 1973 ===
From 23 January in anticipation of the Paris Peace Accords ceasefire, PAVN/VC and South Vietnamese forces attempted to maximize the territory under their control in the War of the flags before the ceasefire came into effect.

At 08:00 on 28 January the ceasefire came into effect.

On 28 January the Defense Attaché Office, Saigon (DAO) was activated, it would assume many of the responsibilities of MACV, within the limits imposed by the Paris Peace Accords.

From 29 January to 3 February MAG-12 redeployed out of South Vietnam.

From March to 4 May in the Battle of Hồng Ngự the PAVN attempted to interdict South Vietnamese supply convoys moving up the Mekong river into Cambodia.

From 25 March to 12 April 1974 in the Battle of Tong Le Chon, the PAVN lay siege to and finally captured the Rangers' Tong Le Chon camp.

In August Thieu finally replaced Minh as Corps' commander with his old ally General Phạm Quốc Thuần.

In late September, the 2nd Battalion, 49th Infantry, 25th Division, was ambushed in a rubber plantation between Highway 22 and Khiem Hahn, losing 43 killed, and 150 weapons and 18 field radios lost.

On 3 October, more than 200 soldiers of the PAVN 207th Regiment were killed by ARVN forces in the Battle of Ap Da Bien.

On 3 December PAVN/VC rockets hit the Nhà Bè fuel depot, the largest fuel storage facility in South Vietnam with approximately 80% of the nation's storage capacity, destroying or damaging 30 fuel tanks and igniting over 600,000 barrels of fuel.

On 15 December Captain Richard Morgan Rees serving with Field Team 6, Control Team B, Headquarters, Joint Casualty Resolution Center was killed when VC forces ambushed a joint US-South Vietnamese team engaged on an MIA recovery mission 15 miles (24 km) southwest of Saigon. A South Vietnamese pilot was also killed in the attack and another four Americans were wounded. As a result of this attack all US MIA field recovery efforts were indefinitely suspended.

=== 1974 ===
From 27 March to 2 May, the 25th Division and 7th Ranger Group fought the Battle of Svay Rieng, the last major South Vietnamese offensive operation of the war.

In early April the PAVN 7th Division attacked Chi Linh on Route 13, manned by the 215th RF Company quickly damaging the two howitzers and destroying the ammunition dump. On 5 April the 3rd Battalion, 141st Regiment, with the division's 28th Sapper and 22d Artillery Battalion supporting, overran the base. With the elimination of Chi Linh, the PAVN enjoyed unimpeded movement along Route 13 between Chon Thanh and Don Luan and had reduced the effectiveness of the ARVN defenses of Don Luan and Chon Thanh.

On 15 May the 8th Infantry Regiment attacked assembly areas of the PAVN 209th Infantry, severely disrupting their preparations for an attack on the Sông Bé bridge. The next day the 322nd RF Battalion fought off the attack on the bridge.

On 16 May the PAVN 165th Infantry Regiment attacked the Bo La area, managing to hold enough of Route 1A to prevent reinforcements from breaking through to the Song Be bridge. The 5th Division reacted immediately and sent its 7th Infantry Regiment and the 315th Task Force north to break the block on Route 1A. By 23 May, despite reinforcement by a battalion of the 141st Regiment, the ARVN tank and infantry counterattack had cleared the road to the bridge and beyond to Phuoc Vinh.

From 16 May to 20 November in the Battle of the Iron Triangle the PAVN attempted to seize control of the Iron Triangle, but were eventually pushed back in a series of costly counterattacks.

On 24 May three PAVN battalions overran Bao Binh hamlet east of Xuan Loc, they would not be evicted until August.

On 11 June, a PAVN force attacked the Rung La refugee resettlement village and cut Route 1 about 30km east of Bao Binh. An ARVN task force consisting of two battalions of the 8th Infantry, the 32nd Ranger Battalion and a tank company cleared the PAVN by 17 June. The PAVN returned to the area again on 8 July and held it until the 13th.

On 10 August a PAVN rocket attack on Bien Hoa Air Base slightly damaging several F-5A jets, most of the rest fell on civilian communities causing light casualties. The bombardment signalled the beginning of the PAVN's attack on the outposts along the north bank of the Đồng Nai River in Tan Uyen District north of the air base. The PAVN 165th Infantry Regiment overran Ho Da, west of Tan Uyen District Town, on the night of 9 August, but the town was recovered by the ARVN 52nd Infantry five days later. On the 10th, a battalion of the 165th Infantry captured Dat Cuoc outpost at the big bend in the Dong Nai east of Tan Uyen. The PAVN managed to hold on to this outpost until 24 August, when the 346th RF Battalion recaptured it. East of Dat Cuoc on the river north of Thai Hung village, was the Ba Cam outpost, manned by the 316th RF Ballalion. In successive attacks, the 316th was driven out of its defenses by a battalion of the 165th Infantry, heavily supported by artillery. By 13 August, the 316th had withdrawn to Thai Hung, virtually destroyed by PAVN and ARVN artillery. By the end of the month, ARVN counterattacks had recovered all lost positions north of the Dong Nai.

On 14 August the PAVN 6th Regiment, 5th Division, launched heavy mortar and artillery bombardments into three outposts west of Tay Ninh. At Luoc Tan outpost, the 2nd Company 312th RF Battalion held on and beat back successive assaults by tank-supported battalions. Artillery and air strikes knocked out one tank and killed over 300 PAVN. On the night of 20 August a PAVN battalion breached the shattered defensive works and captured the remnants of the 97-man garrison.

On 21 October a PAVN sapper attack on the Hóa An Bridge over the Dong Nai river linking Bien Hoa with Saigon, succeeded in knocking down two 60-meter spans.

On 30 October Thieu replaced Thuần as Corps' commander with Lieutenant general Dư Quốc Đống.

On 7 December the PAVN 7th Battalion, 205th Regiment lost over 100 soldiers trying to overrun Suoi Da on Route 13. On 12 December a 46th Infantry Regiment relief column moving up Route 13 from Tay Ninh City was ambushed suffering heavy casualties.

On 8 December the PAVN 812th Regiment attacked Tánh Linh district with one sapper and three infantry battalions supported by the 130th Artillery Battalion. By 9 December the PAVN held most of Tánh Linh, the surrounding villages and the road between Tánh Linh and Võ Xu. In mid-December the Corps' headquarters order the 18th Division to reinforce the RF/PF in Binh Tuy Province and a four battalion task force was sent up Route 333, but was unable to advance past Gia Huynh. Following a 3,000-round bombardment on 23 and 24 December, the PAVN launched five successive assaults, finally overrunning the last defenses in Tanh Linh on 25 December.

From 12 December to 6 January 1975 the PAVN 3rd, 7th and 9th Divisions defeated the 5th Division and Regional Forces in the Battle of Phước Long.

=== 1975 ===
On 6 January, after being besieged for over a month, the 80-man RF Company stationed on the summit of Nui Ba Den withdrew to ARVN lines.

On 17 January, the Corps launched an operation, using the 25th Division, to retake Nui Ba Den. While artillery, helicopter gunships and fighter-bombers pounded the PAVN positions, ARVN Ranger patrols searched for artillery positions in the jungles north of the mountain. An airmobile assault on the summit was attempted, but anti-aircraft artillery and small arms fire prevented the landing. By 26 January it was apparent that retaking Nui Ba Den was beyond the resources available to the Corps.

During the last week of January 1975, the ARVN had the road cleared from Gia Ray to Hoai Duc and by February had reoccupied the village of Vo Xu.

On 5 February General Nguyễn Văn Toàn replaced Đống as Corps' commander.

On 10 March the PAVN began their 1975 spring offensive by attacking Ban Me Thuot and triggering the collapse of South Vietnamese forces in the Central Highlands.

On the morning of 2 April II Corps commander Major general Phạm Văn Phú met with General Nguyễn Văn Hiếu, the deputy commander of III Corps near Phan Thiết, Hiếu informed Phú that II Corps had been dissolved and the remaining provinces and forces would be incorporated into III Corps.

On the morning of 3 April 1975 the RVNAF at Phan Rang Air Base launched a heliborne operation to rescue the remnants of the ARVN 2nd, 5th and 6th Airborne Battalions that had been cut off at the M'Đrăk Pass, successfully evacuating over 800 soldiers. That day the PAVN 10th Division captured Cam Ranh Bay and Cam Ranh Air Base north of Phan Rang.

On 4 April the two remaining provinces of II Corps were incorporated into III Corps and Lieutenant general Nguyễn Vĩnh Nghi arrived at Phan Rang to take over the defense of the area.

On 14 April the PAVN attacked Phan Rang Air Base but were repulsed. On 16 April a renewed attack on the base forced the evacuation of numerous aircraft and the base was overrun on the early morning of 17 April, with Nghi being captured.

From 9 to 21 April the 18th Division held back three PAVN divisions in the Battle of Xuân Lộc, before being forced to withdraw.

From 29 to 30 April the US conducted Operation Frequent Wind, the helicopter evacuation of over 7,000 US civilians and "at-risk" Vietnamese from Saigon.

At 14:30 on 30 April, after being captured by PAVN forces at the Independence Palace, President Duong Van Minh ordered the surrender of all South Vietnamese military forces.

== Divisions ==
5th Infantry Division

18th Infantry Division

25th Infantry Division
