= Operation Mastiff =

Part of the Vietnam War (1966)

- Part of the Vietnam War
Date	21–25 February 1966
Location	Dầu Tiếng District, Bình Dương Province, South Vietnam 11.129°N 106.308°E
Result	Inconclusive

Belligerents
United States	North Vietnam

Commanders and leaders
MG Jonathan O. Seaman	

Units involved
1st Infantry Division	9th Infantry Division

Casualties and losses
17 killed	61 killed

Operation Mastiff was an operation conducted by the US 1st Infantry Division in the Dầu Tiếng District, lasting from 21 to 25 February 1966.

== Prelude ==
US intelligence reports indicated that the People's Army of Vietnam (PAVN) 9th Division planned to attack the Army of the Republic of Vietnam (ARVN) 8th Regiment, 5th Infantry Division in the Dầu Tiếng District and was massing its forces in the Boi Loi Woods 12 km south of Dầu Tiếng. US commander General William Westmoreland ordered MG Jonathan O. Seaman to launch a spoiling attack on the PAVN.

Concerned about possible leaks by the ARVN III Corps staff, Seaman shared a false plan indicating that the target was the Michelin Rubber Plantation east of Dầu Tiếng and B-52 strikes were conducted in that area to lend it credibility. It was hoped that this would cause the PAVN to move their forces to the west bank of the Saigon River where the real operation would take place. After this ruse had been in place for a week the real operation commenced.

== Operation ==
On the morning of 21 February 142 helicopters began lifting the 2nd and 3rd Brigades of the 1st Infantry Division to establish a cordon around a 100 square kilometer area around the west bank of the Saigon River. The units then moved in from the north and south discovering abandoned base areas, hospitals and supplies but few PAVN soldiers.

== Aftermath ==
Operation Mastiff officially concluded on 25 February, but it took another two days for the operation to wind down completely. The US claimed PAVN/VC losses were 61 killed (40 of them in a single airstrike), US losses were 17 killed and 94 wounded (mostly by mines and booby traps). The operation was a major disappointment for the US command as the PAVN 9th Division was not engaged and the PAVN had again demonstrated their ability to choose when and where it would stand and fight.

Although there were no major engagements with VC forces, the 3rd Brigade commander Colonel Brodbeck still considered they accomplished their mission successfully like defeating VC in a large battle by moving into an area never before entered by US troops and destroying critical VC base camps, stores of food, munitions and medical supplies.
