= Battle of Sông Bé =

1965 battle during the Vietnam War

- Part of the Vietnam War
Date	10-12 May 1965
Location	Sông Bé, Bình Phước Province, South Vietnam UTM Grid YU 19-11
Result	South Vietnamese and American victory

Belligerents
Viet Cong	South Vietnam; United States

Units involved
761st Regiment; 763rd Regiment; 840th Battalion	(South Vietnam) 34th Ranger Battalion (South Vietnam) 36th Ranger Battalion (United States) B-34 Detachment

Strength
2,500	Unknown

Casualties and losses
297 killed	(South Vietnam) 58 killed (United States) 5 killed

The Battle of Sông Bé was a major action between the Viet Cong (VC) and Army of the Republic of Vietnam (ARVN) in May 1965.

Planned as a major show of force against the ARVN forces, the VC attempted to capture Sông Bé and the capital of Phước Long Province. However, ARVN forces in the area rallied and re-took the town by the end of the second day of combat.

== Background ==
Central Office for South Vietnam (COSVN)'s goal for the 1965 summer offensive in III Corps was to solidify control over an arc of territory north and east of Saigon that would cut the capital city off from I and II Corps. The most important targets were Bình Long and Phước Long provinces. Remote and sparsely populated, they served as strategic crossroads linking Cambodian sanctuaries with War Zones C and D, and VC forces in Cochinchina with those in the Central Highlands. The other targeted provinces were Lâm Đồng, Bình Thuận, Phước Tuy, Long Khánh and Biên Hòa.

In preparation for the campaign, COSVN mobilized ordinary civilians who contributed 140,000 days of labor to move and stockpile supplies. MACV obtained an inkling of what was brewing in April when it translated a captured document that claimed that the VC planned a "second Dien Bien Phu" campaign that would target provincial and district capitals north of Saigon.

On 9 May 1965, a defector entered Sông Bé, the capital of Phuoc Long Province and a town of 15,000 people situated 119km northeast of Saigon. The defector reported that an attack on the town was imminent. Prisoners captured the following day convinced the province chief that the assault would occur overnight, and he put half of the garrison on alert. This included 250 soldiers of the 36th Ranger Battalion and 150 territorials. Also present were three dozen US military advisers, most of whom belonged to Special Forces Detachment B-34, which, in April, had become the sector advisory team. Many of the Americans felt the province chief was overreacting.

The VC B-2 Front had massed three infantry regiments in III Corps, the veteran 271st (aka 1st) and 272nd (aka 2nd) Regiments and the newly raised 273rd (aka 3rd) Regiment. Joining them were the 840th Battalion, two sapper platoons, and an artillery contingent that, in addition to the mortars and recoilless rifles organic to the infantry units, consisted of two 75mm howitzers, two 82mm mortars, eight 75mm recoilless rifles, and eight heavy machine guns.

The plan, which the VC commander carefully rehearsed using a sand table and troop exercises, was for the 1st Battalion, 271st Regiment, and the 840th Battalion to seize Sông Bé, while a battalion from the 272d Regiment captured the district capital of Phước Bình. The rest of the force was to lay in ambush for any troops the government sent to recapture the towns. The weakest part of the plan concerned fire support. Much of the artillery had to march a long distance through rough terrain to reach the battlefield. As it happened, many soldiers fell out of formation because of illness or fatigue. The attrition limited the amount of ammunition the VC would have available for the fight.

== Battle ==
The VC launched their attack in the early hours of 11 May 1965. It took just 25 minutes for them to overrun Phước Bình, but Sông Bé proved tougher. Having carefully plotted their locations in advance, VC artillery successfully hit many key installations around Sông Bé in the opening minutes of the battle. The infantry then surged forward, capturing the province chief's home, the police station, and much of the town. The VC also captured four armored cars, which they then turned against the South Vietnamese. The VC ran into trouble, however, when they reached the advisory compound. Believing the headquarters ill-prepared to withstand an attack, B-34's commander, Lieutenant colonel Alton E. Park, had ordered the building additional fortifications inside the compound's perimeter in the days before the battle. The VC had not known of these entrenchments, and, consequently, the positions emerged from the bombardment unscathed. VC shells did, however, severely wound Park, so his executive officer, Major Mitchell A. Sakely, conducted the defense.

A sapper platoon led the assault. It penetrated the compound’s outer defenses as a Popular Forces company broke and ran. Fighting soon swirled in and around the compound's buildings. The VC captured the mess hall, which the Americans were using as a first aid station, killing several Green Berets in the process. One of the men lying incapacitated inside was Park. An insurgent searched Park's pockets and then shot him in the back. Another injured soldier in the mess hall, Sergeant Richard Bartlett, pretended to be dead. After kicking his body and deciding he was deceased, a VC soldier rested his weapon against Bartlett, using his body as cover. Every time the soldier fired, a bullet grazed Bartlett’s arm. He endured the pain and remained still until the Americans retook the hall after about 20 minutes.

The fighting was equally desperate elsewhere in the camp. Sixty rangers repulsed a VC battalion along one sector of the perimeter, while two American civilian reporters who happened to be present used rifles to protect the base's mortarmen. On the camp's western face, two special forces NCOs stood ankle deep in shell casings, manning a machine gun throughout the night despite multiple injuries. Even a US Army doctor grabbed a rifle. When a soldier questioned whether he was violating the Geneva Convention by taking up arms, the doctor replied, "This is preventive medicine. I shoot them before they shoot me."

As the battle raged, the VC's artillery support gradually slackened because of the shortage of ammunition. At 03:00, US Army helicopter gunships from the 197th Aviation Company arrived overhead to support the defenders. The rangers staged a counterattack, but the VC repulsed them and killed their commander. By dawn, each side clung to a portion of the base, but neither could make headway against the other.

Aware of the VC's penchant for ambushing relief columns, the South Vietnamese reacted cautiously. Advancing from the southwest, a ranger battalion detected and avoided an ambush before reaching Sông Bé around midday on the 11th. US helicopters ferried in additional reinforcements, but because the VC had miscalculated where they would land, they came to no harm. Skirmishing continued in and around the town through the day, but with their ammunition running low, the VC began to withdraw. Allied aircraft, including US Air Force A–1Es and B–57s and US Army helicopter gunships, harried the VC as best they could in overcast weather. The bulk of the VC waited until the night of 11–12 May to make their escape. A battalion from the 48th Infantry, advancing from the northeast, ran into a VC battalion on the afternoon of 12 May and, after a sharp engagement, emerged victorious. Having failed either to capture Sông Bé quickly or to destroy government reinforcements, and lacking enough ammunition for a sustained battle, the B-2 Front had decided not to press its luck. Given the size of the VC force, matters could have been much worse for the South Vietnamese.

== Aftermath ==
Both sides claimed victory. The VC had captured a district seat and much of a provincial capital and had held them for several hours. According to one Communist history, the VC had killed 1,389 allied soldiers, including 30 Americans, shot down 14 planes, and captured 700 weapons. In truth, they achieved much less. Most importantly, they had failed to pull off the operation's main point, which was to ambush government relief forces. Contrary to Communist claims, the battle cost the South Vietnamese 58 dead, 96 wounded, and 83 missing. The ARVN lost 109 weapons, 21 radios, and four armored cars that the VC had captured, but which the allies later destroyed. Five Americans died in the fighting, and thirteen were wounded (Park survived). VC gunners shot down a B–57. The allies variously reported civilian casualties as between 12 and 80 people. The VC, as usual, were silent about their losses, but advisers on the scene reported that 297 VC had died. MACV speculated that VC casualties could have been as high as 1,000 killed or injured. It had been a costly battle for everyone, but, on balance, the allies had won the first round of the Summer Offensive.
