= Thái Quang Hoàng =

Thái Quang Hoàng

Lieutenant General Thái Quang Hoàng (c. 1920 – February 22, 1993) was an officer of the Army of the Republic of Vietnam. He was born in Vinh.

He served as the commander of III Corps, which oversaw the region of the country surrounding the capital Saigon, from 1 March 1959 until 11 October of the same year, when he was replaced by Lieutenant General Nguyen Ngoc Le. He was the first commander of III Corps.

In 1975, he emigrated to Arlington in the United States. As a self-taught goldsmith, he worked in the family jewellery business. He died of cancer in 1993, aged 73.
