= Operation Barking Sands =

Part of the Vietnam War (1967)

- Part of the Vietnam War
Date	18 May – 7 December 1967
Location	Hậu Nghĩa (now in Tay Ninh Province and Bình Dương Provinces, South Vietnam

Belligerents
United States	Viet Cong

Units involved
1st Brigade, 25th Infantry Division	

Casualties and losses
152 killed	304 killed 218 individual and 18 crew-served weapons recovered

Operation Barking Sands was a pacification operation during the Vietnam War conducted by the 1st Brigade, 25th Infantry Division that took place in Hậu Nghĩa and Bình Dương Provinces, lasting from 18 May to 7 December 1967.

== Background ==
The operation was focussed on the Củ Chi and Trảng Bàng Districts of Hậu Nghĩa Province and the Phu Hoa District of Bình Dương Province which were long-term Vietcong (VC) bases and supply routes. Numerous small unit actions were conducted including Bushmaster (extensive company size patrols), cordon and search of suspected VC hamlets, Roadrunner (mine sweeping of roads) and Checkmate (unannounced roadblocks to check for VC personnel or supplies being moved by surface transportation). In addition, search and destroy missions employing airmobile assaults into the Iron Triangle, and along the west side of the Saigon River south of the Iron Triangle were conducted, when intelligence reports located VC units in the area.

== Operation ==
On 30 May 1st Brigade forces killed 10 VC.

On 7 July northwest of Phu Cuong 1st Brigade units engaged a VC force losing 5 killed. On 13 July the VC attacked a 1st Brigade unit with Rocket-propelled grenades killing 1 US soldier.

On 30 August the 4th Battalion, 9th Infantry Regiment conducted airmobile assaults against an entrenched VC battalion in the Iron Triangle. Small arms, automatic weapons, artillery and airstrikes were directed against the VC resulting in 4 VC killed while US losses were 11 killed.

Operation Waimea was launched as part of the operation from 22 through 26 August. In addition to an organic battalion of the 1st Brigade, Waimea included the 4th Battalion, 12th Infantry placed under the 1st Brigade's operational control and the Army of the Republic of Vietnam 2nd and 4th Battalions, 7th Regiment, 5th Division. The operation was conducted along the Rach Tra, from grid reference XT7507 (10.914°N 106.6°E) to the Saigon River and along the opposite bank of the Saigon River. The operation was designed to drive the VC from the area and to destroy their base camps and fortifications. Contact throughout the operation was limited, however, to engagement of VC in sampans and destruction of fortifications, many of which were booby trapped.

The operation continued throughout September as a pacification operation, to which was added the security of jungle clearing operations. During 1–5 September primary emphasis was placed on platoon and company size patrols to deny VC units access to populated areas during the Presidential elections. After the elections were held jungle clearing operations were begun in the Rach Tra area. The purpose of this clearing was to eliminate foliage used by VC units for concealment when moving along the waterways flowing from the Saigon River. Clearing operations intensified with Operation Kunia, to eliminate the Ho Bo Woods as a VC base area. The operation continued as a search and destroy operation and security for jungle clearing.

== Aftermath ==
The operation concluded on 7 December 1967. VC losses were 304 killed and 218 individual and 18 crew-served weapons captured for US losses of 152 killed.
