= Operation Toan Thang 1/71 =

Part of the Vietnam War (1971)

- Part of the Vietnam War
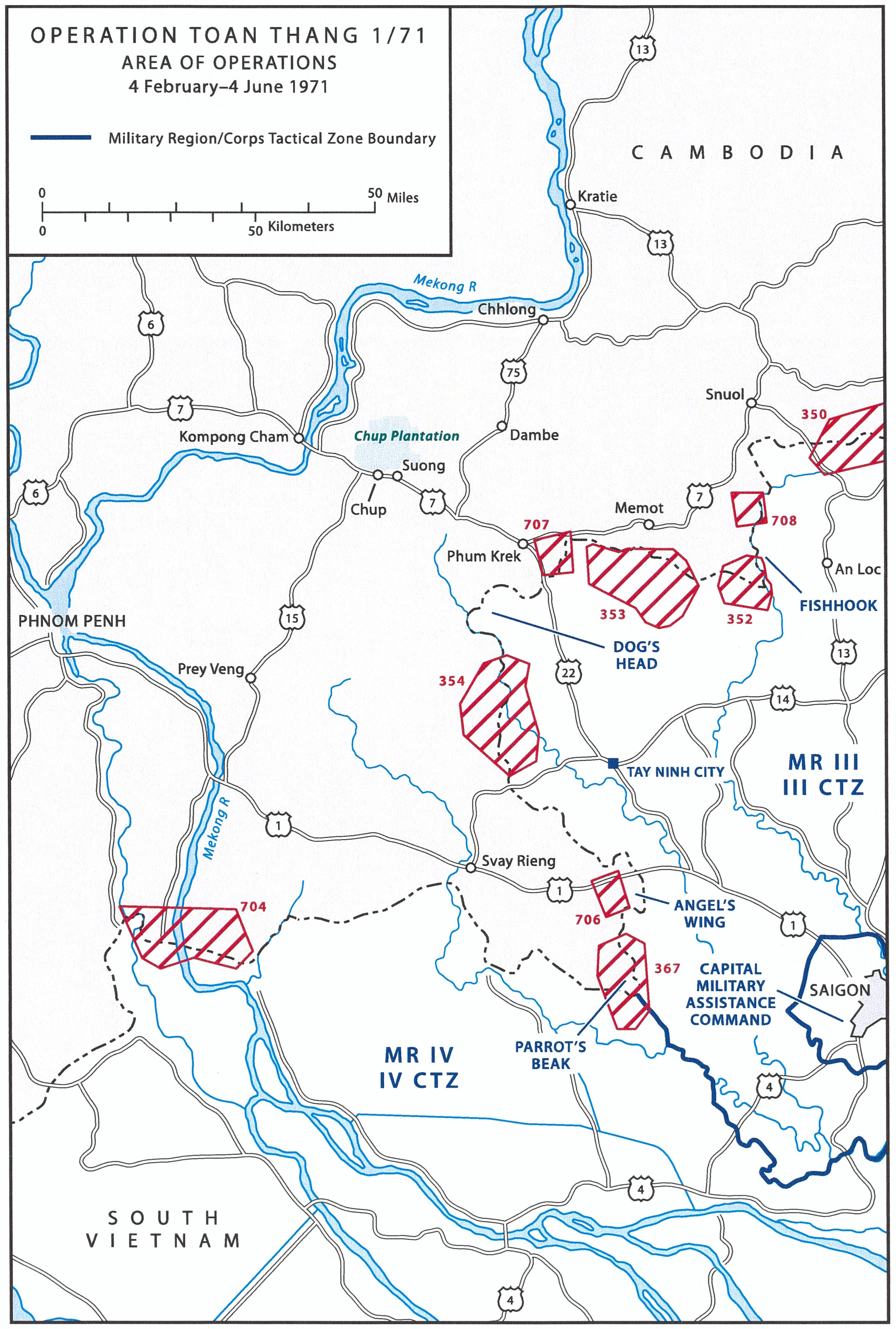
- Map of Operation Toan Thang 1/71
Date	4 February – June 1971
Location	Highway 7, Cambodia
Result	Indecisive

Belligerents
South Vietnam; Khmer Republic; United States	North Vietnam; Khmer Rouge

Commanders and leaders
Đỗ Cao Trí; Nguyễn Văn Minh	

Units involved
(South Vietnam) 5th Infantry Division	

Casualties and losses
(South Vietnam) 133+ killed, 130 missing (United States) 2 killed	South Vietnamese body count: 1,143 killed

Operation Toan Thang 1/71 was an operation during the Vietnam War conducted by South Vietnamese forces from 4 February to June 1971 to reopen Highway 7 in Cambodia and destroy North Vietnamese bases.

== Background ==
With the pro-American Khmer Republic government still under severe threat and the People's Army of Vietnam (PAVN) rebuilding their supply lines, COMUSMACV General Creighton Abrams and Chairman of the South Vietnamese Joint General Staff, General Cao Văn Viên agreed on a new incursion into Cambodia. Because the United States Congress had just adopted the revised Cooper-Church Amendment banning U.S. ground troops from entering Cambodia, American support would be limited to Army and Air Force aviation overhead and Army artillery based in South Vietnam.

The goal of Operation Toan Thang 1/71 was to destroy PAVN and Khmer Rouge bases and to help the Cambodian forces reestablish control over the area north of Highway 7 up to the Mekong River town of Kratié.

== Operation ==
On 4 February 1971, Lieutenant general Đỗ Cao Trí led the first of 16,000 Army of the Republic of Vietnam (ARVN) troops into Cambodia. Initially the troops concentrated on clearing Highway 7 between Snuol and Chup, and for the most part the PAVN avoided contact.

On 26 February, however, advancing ARVN troops came under fire from a line of bunkers concealed in a tree line. Captain Jon E. Swanson of the 1st Squadron, 9th Cavalry Regiment, swept down in his OH-6A scout helicopter to engage the enemy with grenades and machine guns. After destroying five bunkers he came under fire from an antiaircraft machine gun. Despite having expended his grenades, he engaged the position with machine guns and knocked it out. When a second antiaircraft gun opened fire, hitting his helicopter, he attacked again before directing an Army helicopter gunship to destroy the target. He was then engaged by a third antiaircraft gun. Ignoring his own safety he flew his damaged and now virtually unarmed helicopter toward the enemy to mark the target for the gunships when enemy fire caused his helicopter to explode, killing him and his copilot. Swanson was posthumously awarded the Distinguished Service Cross for his actions that day. In 2002 the award was upgraded to the Medal of Honor.

Trí had been killed in a helicopter accident on 23 February and his successor, General Nguyễn Văn Minh, was less aggressive. This combined with the South Vietnamese focus on Operation Lam Son 719, which had begun on 8 February but had bogged down, meant that the momentum behind the incursion had started to wane.

The first large engagement occurred on 17 March, when two South Vietnamese task forces, supported by U.S. Army gunships, engaged a PAVN regiment in a two-day battle in the Chup Plantation, a major enemy depot. Two weeks later, a South Vietnamese task force defeated an enemy battalion in a five-hour battle near Suong.

After some additional activity around Snuol during the first week in April, the PAVN went to ground. Thereafter, ARVN troops focused on uprooting enemy supply caches. The operation remained relatively uneventful until the PAVN learned that the South Vietnamese planned to withdraw a task force of the 5th Infantry Division from Snuol in late May. The Battle of Snuol began on 25 May when three PAVN regiments massed to cut Highway 13, thereby trapping the task force in Snuol. An ARVN task force was sent up Highway 13 to relieve the besieged the task force, but the operation became a rout and the ARVN suffered heavy losses of men and equipment as they withdrew. The battle rendered the ARVN 5th Division combat ineffective in the estimation of its American advisers. According to II Field Force, Vietnam commander Michael S. Davison, the 5th Division troops were close to mutiny.

== Aftermath ==
Operation Toan Thang 1/71 ended in June. The senior U.S. adviser to III Corps, Major general Jack J. Wagstaff, declared the results mixed. The operation had imposed heavy casualties on the PAVN, tying down three enemy divisions away from South Vietnam and further bolstering the Khmer Republic. On the other hand, the South Vietnamese had not done significant damage to the enemy's logistical network and the debacle at Snuol once again raised questions about the progress of Vietnamization.
