= Operation Austin IV =

Part of the Vietnam War (1966)

- Part of the Vietnam War
Date	1–18 May 1966
Location	Phước Long Province, South Vietnam

Belligerents
United States	North Vietnam

Commanders and leaders
BG Willard Pearson; Lt.Col. Henry E. Emerson	

Units involved
1st Brigade, 101st Airborne Division; 173rd Airborne Brigade	141st Regiment

Casualties and losses
9 killed	101 killed 148 estimated killed 6 captured

Operation Austin IV was a search and destroy operation conducted by the 1st Brigade, 101st Airborne Division and the 173rd Airborne Brigade in western Quang Duc and Phước Long Provinces, South Vietnam, from 1 to 18 May 1966.

== Prelude ==
Operation Austin IV was a search and destroy operation near the Cambodian border in II Corps.

== Operation ==
On 1 May the 2nd Battalion, 502nd Infantry Regiment conducted a helicopter assault near Bu Prang Camp and patrolled the area until 6 May without making any contact with the PAVN. Also on 1 May the 1st Battalion, 327th Infantry Regiment was deployed by helicopter onto 2 infiltration routes from Cambodia and patrolled the area until 8 May without making any contact.

On 6 May following intelligence indicating the presence of enemy forces near the abandoned Special Forces base at Bù Gia Mập, the 2/502nd was moved from Bu Prang to Bù Gia Mập and were joined by A Troop 17th Cavalry Regiment on 8 May and the 1/327th on 10 May. On 10 May Company A, 2/502nd captured a soldier from the PAVN 141st Regiment who revealed that 4 companies of his unit were waiting in an ambush nearby. On 11 May Company A, 2/502nd and A/17th Cavalry encircled the PAVN ambush position and then called in air and artillery strikes, which resulted in claims of the destruction of most of a PAVN battalion.

On 14 May a B-52 strike took place northwest of Bù Gia Mập and 2/502nd and 2nd Battalion, 503rd Infantry Regiment were sent into the area to exploit the strike but met only scattered resistance. On 17 May 2/502nd was flown out of Bù Gia Mập to Nhon Co (11.978°N 107.565°E), while 2/503rd was flown by helicopter to Sông Bé Base Camp. On 18 May 1/327th was flown out to Nhon Co.

== Aftermath ==
Operation Austin IV officially concluded on 18 May, with the US claiming PAVN losses of 101 killed, 148 estimated killed and 6 captured, U.S. losses were 9 killed.
