= Operation Wahiawa =

Part of the Vietnam War (1966)

- Part of the Vietnam War
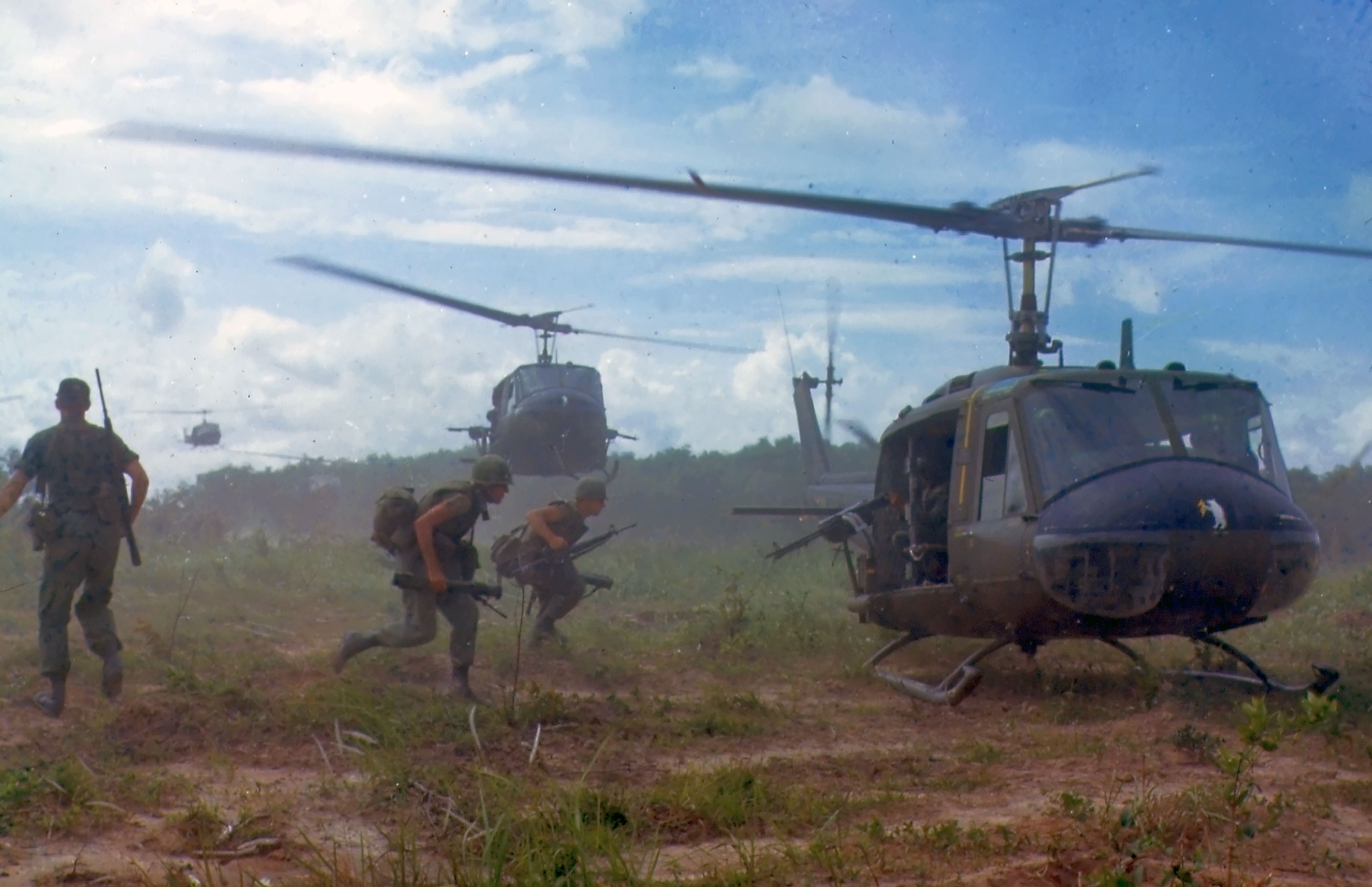
- UH-1D helicopters airlift members of the 2nd Battalion, 14th Infantry Regiment from the Filhol Rubber Plantation during the operation
Date	16–30 May 1966
Location	Hậu Nghĩa Province (now in Binh Duong Province), South Vietnam

Belligerents
United States	Viet Cong

Commanders and leaders
MGen Frederick C. Weyand	

Units involved
25th Infantry Division	1st Battalion, 165A Regiment

Casualties and losses
	157 killed

Operation Wahiawa was an operation conducted by the 25th Infantry Division in Hậu Nghĩa Province, South Vietnam, lasting from 16 to 30 May 1966.

== Prelude ==
U.S. intelligence indicated that the Viet Cong (VC) 1st Battalion, 165A Regiment and its headquarters and supply depots were located in the Filhol Plantation, the Ho Bo Woods and the Boi Loi Woods (now in Binh Duong Province).

== Operation ==
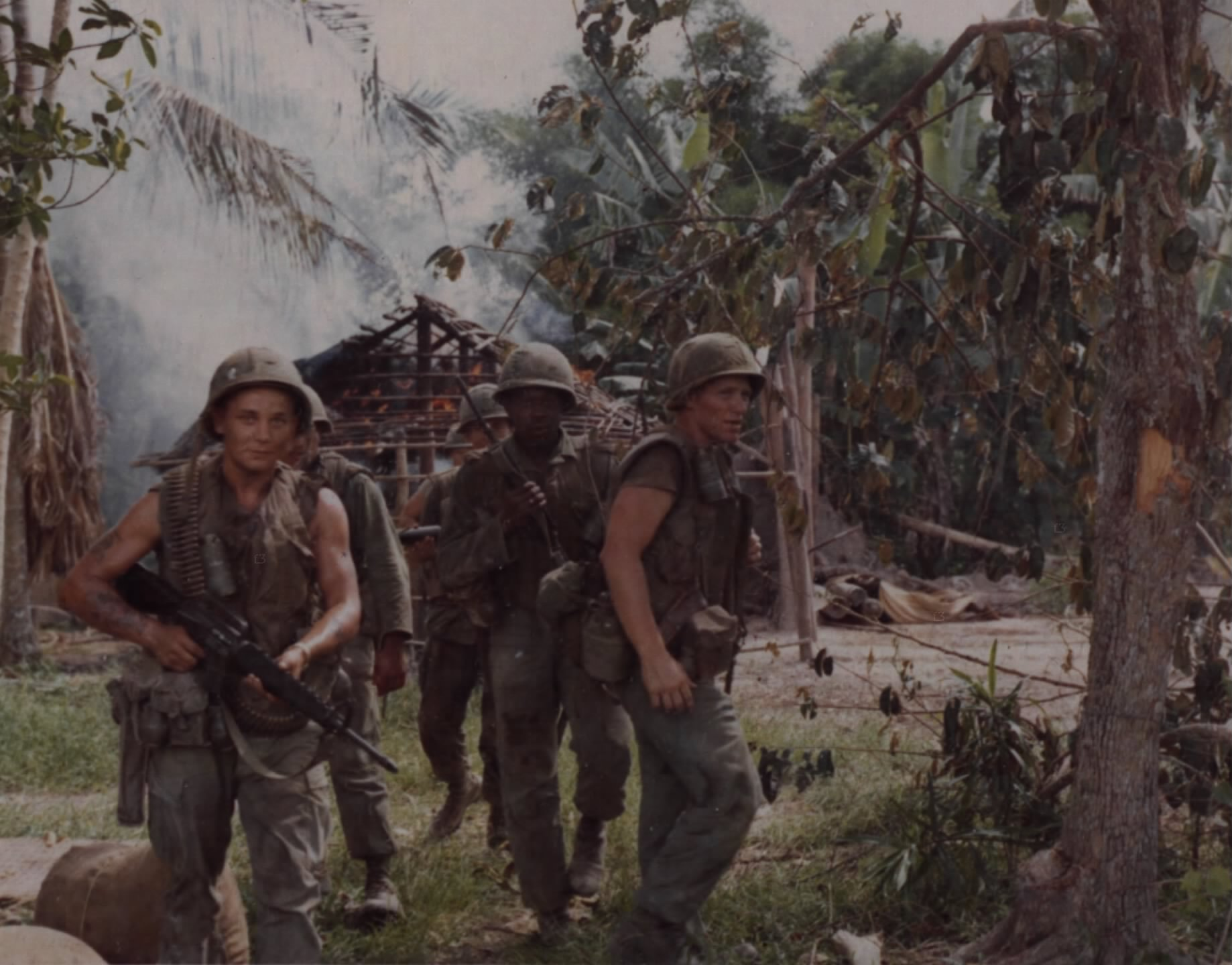
Men of "B" Company, 2nd Battalion, 14th Infantry, search for VC, 20 May 1966

Due to the proximity of the operational area to the 25th Division's Củ Chi Base Camp, Division commander BG Frederick C. Weyand committed the entire division to the operation. The division's sweeps encountered sporadic resistance and uncovered numerous supply caches.

== Aftermath ==
Operation Wahiawa officially concluded on 30 May, the US had claimed VC losses were 157 killed.
