= Michelin Rubber Plantation =

Rubber plantation in Vietnam

Coordinates: 11.2631°N 106.3339°E

The Michelin Rubber Plantation was a rubber plantation in Vietnam. It was located near Dầu Tiếng District in Bình Dương Province, 72 km northwest of Saigon. The plantation was established by the Michelin company in 1925 and at 12,400 hectares (31,000 acres) it was the largest rubber plantation in Vietnam. Michelin established Dau Tieng Rubber Company in 1917, according to Binh Duong News.

The plantation was located approximately halfway between the Cambodian border and Saigon and so was an important base and staging area for the Viet Cong (VC) and later the PAVN. The plantation was an important source of revenue for the South Vietnamese government and it was believed that the Michelin Company paid off the VC in order to keep the plantation operating during the war. US forces were obliged to compensate Michelin for damage caused to the rubber trees during operations in the plantation.

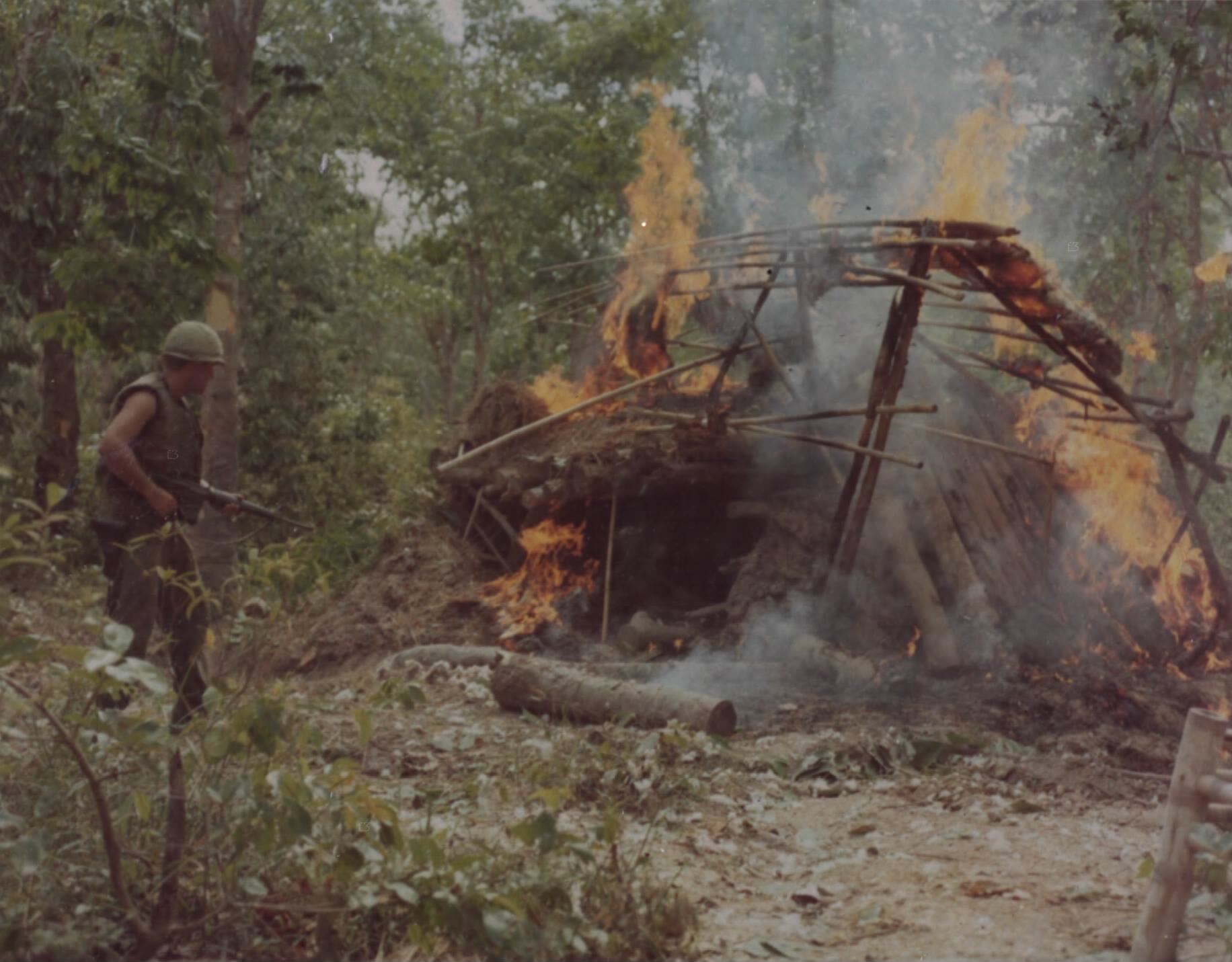
Men of "B" Company, 1st Battalion, 5th (Mechanized) Infantry, 25th Infantry Division set fire to a Vietcong hut during a search and destroy mission in the Michelin Rubber Plantation, 8 April 1966

US and Army of the Republic of Vietnam (ARVN) forces conducted frequent operations against PAVN and VC forces in the plantation. On the morning of 27 November 1965 the ARVN 7th Regiment, 5th Division was overrun by the VC 272nd Regiment, killing most of the Regiment and seven US advisers. From 21 to 27 February 1966 the 2nd and 3rd Brigades, 1st Infantry Division conducted Operation Mastiff, a search and destroy operation in and around the plantation. From 22 February to 14 May 1967 3rd Brigade, 4th Infantry Division, 196th Infantry Brigade, 173rd Airborne Brigade, 11th Armored Cavalry Regiment, VNMC 1st and 5th Battalions and ARVN 35th and 36th Ranger Battalions conducted Operation Junction City which included operations in the plantation. From 17 May to 7 December 1967, the 3rd Brigade, 25th Infantry Division conducted Operation Diamond Head, a search and destroy operation in the Plantation and surrounding areas. From 17 to 24 March 1969 the 1st Infantry Division, 11th Armored Cavalry Regiment, 1/4th Cavalry conducted Operation Atlas Wedge in the plantation.

In 1975 after the fall of Saigon, first the plantation and then the factory in Saigon was nationalized by the communist government.

In 2010, a village was recreated inside a plantation in Dinh Hiep Commune, Dau Tieng District.

== See also ==
- Bến Củi
- Dầu Tiếng
