= Operation Diamond Head =

Part of the Vietnam War (1967)

- Part of the Vietnam War
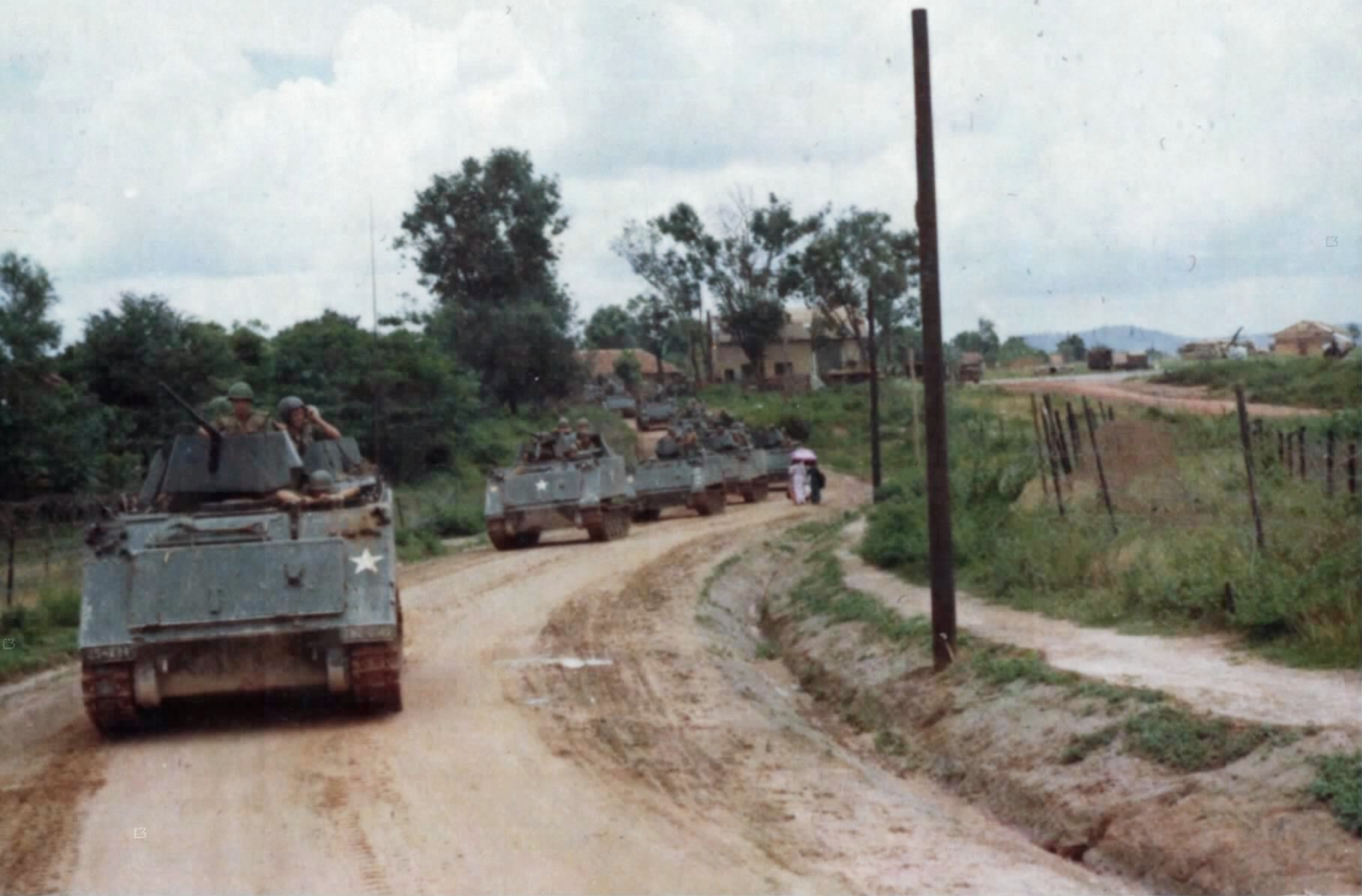
- M113s of the 2nd Battalion, 22nd Infantry, 10 September 1967
Date	11 July – 31 October 1967
Location	Tây Ninh Province, South Vietnam

Belligerents
United States	North Vietnam

Commanders and leaders
MG John C. F. Tillson	

Units involved
3rd Brigade, 25th Infantry Division	101st Regiment; 165th Regiment

Casualties and losses
35 killed	136 killed

Operation Diamond Head was an operation conducted by the 3rd Brigade, 25th Infantry Division in Tây Ninh Province, lasting from 11 July to 31 October 1967.

== Prelude ==
In May 1967, U.S. intelligence located a People's Army of Vietnam (PAVN) supply base in the Angel's Wing area of Cambodia's Svay Rieng Province and learned that a two battalion attack would be made from this sanctuary into Tây Ninh Province in July.

== Operation ==
The operation commenced on 11 July with the 2nd Battalion, 12th Infantry Regiment and the 3rd Battalion, 2nd Infantry Regiment and eight South Vietnamese Regional Force companies conducting sweeps between the Vàm Cỏ Đông River and the Cambodian border.

On 14 July, South Vietnamese agents reported that the PAVN planned to attack Tây Ninh city and that night PAVN forces attacked positions between Tây Ninh and Dầu Tiếng District. The border sweeps were immediately cancelled and on 15 July the two US battalions, reinforced by the 2/22nd Infantry (Mechanized) moved to the scene of the attacks, but the PAVN had fled. On 18 July a U.S. patrol engaged and killed several members of the PAVN 165th Regiment.

The PAVN attack never eventuated and the operation continued with only sporadic contact resulting in 61 PAVN and 31 U.S. killed by the end of August.

On the night of 2 September, a PAVN force attacked a U.S. company's night defensive position destroying two M113s with Rocket-propelled grenades. On 4 September the same company engaged a PAVN force near Black Virgin Mountain losing four killed.

In late September, the 2nd Battalion, 34th Armor Regiment joined the operation and were tasked with defending Tây Ninh Combat Base. The other Battalions swept the Michelin Rubber Plantation claiming to have killed 75 PAVN and locating several supply caches.

During October, the 3rd Brigade formed a blocking force in the eastern Michelin Plantation while the 1st Infantry Division swept the Long Nguyen Secret Zone in Operation Shenandoah II.

== Aftermath ==
Operation Diamond Head officially concluded on 31 October and PAVN losses were 136 killed whereas U.S. losses were 35 killed.
