= Boi Loi Woods =

Vietnamese forested area

Coordinates: 11.1688°N 106.374°E

Boi Loi Woods are located 25km northwest of Củ Chi District and 22km west of Bến Cát District in Hậu Nghĩa Province. The woods were an important base and staging area for the Viet Cong (VC) and later the PAVN.

On 19 January 1965, allied aircraft began Operation Sherwood Forest, pummeling the wood's 76 square kilometers with 800 tons of bombs over the next three days. Then between 22 and 27 January, 40 sorties of U.S. Air Force C–123 aircraft sprayed the area with 33,000 gallons of defoliant. Once the vegetation had dried up, MACV planned to start an inferno by dropping napalm on the tinderbox. By that point, the command estimated that the region's 4,000 inhabitants would have evacuated to one of the five refugee receiving centers the allies had established on the far fringes of the forest. To guide residents to safety, aircraft dropped three million leaflets and made 25 hours of loudspeaker broadcasts. The exodus was slow, with slightly more than 2,000 people reporting to the refugee centers by the end of February. Additional refugees emerged the following month, but the planned incineration failed as unseasonably heavy rains doused the flames.

US and Army of the Republic of Vietnam (ARVN) forces conducted frequent operations against PAVN and VC forces in the woods including Operation Mastiff (21–25 February 1966), Operation Wahiawa (16–30 May 1966), Operation Sunset Beach (2 September-11 October 1966), Operation Manhattan (23 April-7 June 1967), however none of these operations permanently cleared the PAVN/VC and the last attempt by the ARVN to penetrate the area occurred during the War of the flags (25 January-3 February 1973).
