= Operation Sunset Beach =

Part of the Vietnam War (1966)

- Part of the Vietnam War
Date	2 September – 11 October 1966
Location	Hậu Nghĩa Province, South Vietnam

Belligerents
United States	Viet Cong

Commanders and leaders
MGen Frederick C. Weyand; Col. Thomas M. Tarpley	

Units involved
2nd Brigade, 25th Infantry Division	

Casualties and losses
29 killed	80 killed 135 estimated killed

Operation Sunset Beach was an operation conducted by the 2nd Brigade, 25th Infantry Division in Hậu Nghĩa Province, southeastern Tây Ninh Province and southwestern Bình Dương Province, lasting from 2 September to 11 October 1966.

== Prelude ==
Operation Sunset Beach was planned as a security operation intended to engage Viet Cong forces before the South Vietnamese national elections scheduled for 11 September 1966.

== Operation ==
The 2nd Brigade conducted a series of air and ground assaults across the operational area together with Army of the Republic of Vietnam forces, before withdrawing to base camps several days before the elections to avoid accusations of interference.

On 20 September the 1st Battalion, 5th Infantry Regiment (Mechanized) conducted a sweep of the Boi Loi Woods, meeting sporadic resistance and destroying bunkers and supplies.

== Aftermath ==
Operation Sunset Beach officially concluded on 11 October, with US reports claiming that Viet Cong losses were 80 killed (body count) and a further 135 estimated killed, U.S. losses were 29 killed.
