= Operation Kunia =

Part of the Vietnam War (1967)

- Part of the Vietnam War
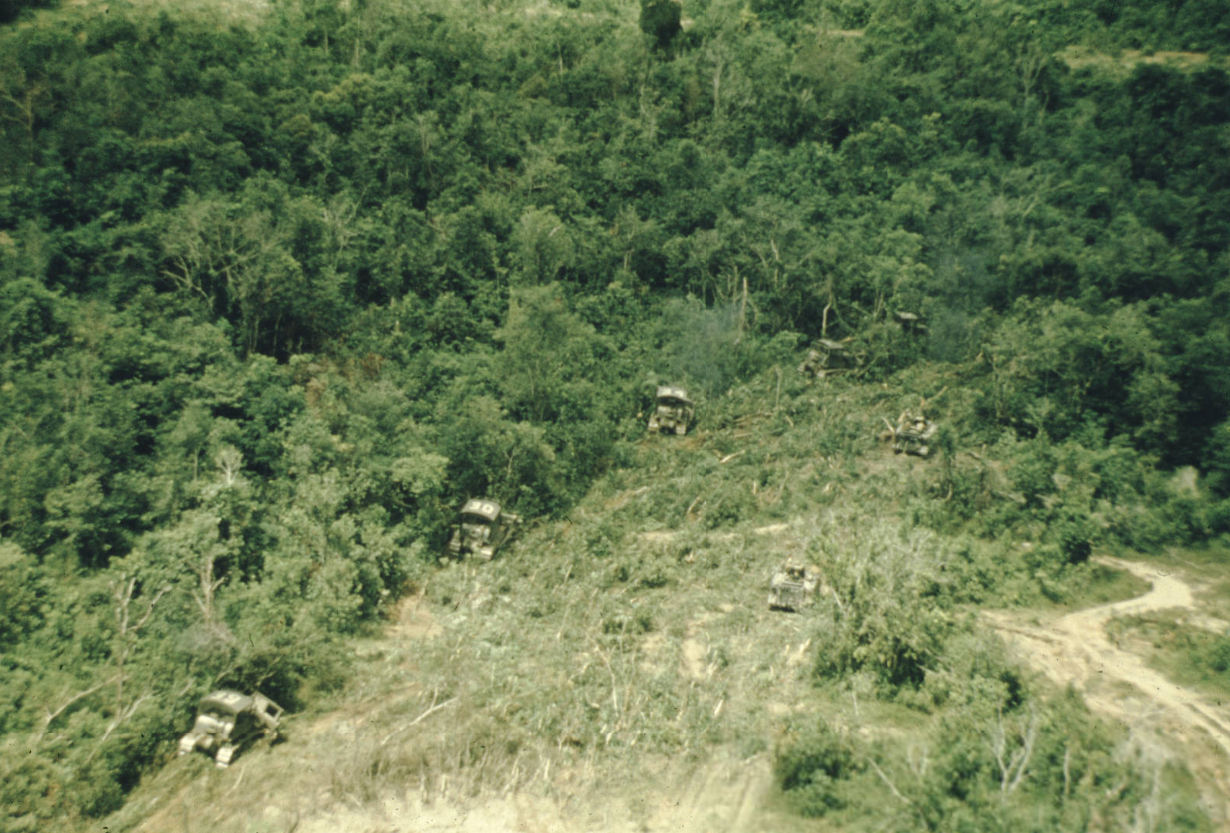
- Rome Plows clearing jungle, 24 September 1967
Date	15 September – 10 November 1967
Location	Ho Bo Woods, Bình Dương Province, South Vietnam
Result	Inconclusive

Belligerents
United States	Viet Cong

Commanders and leaders
MG John C. F. Tillson; Col Edwin H. Marks	

Units involved
1st Brigade, 25th Infantry Division	

Casualties and losses
40 killed	US body count 105 killed

Operation Kunia was an operation conducted by the 1st Brigade, 25th Infantry Division in the Ho Bo Woods, lasting from 15 September to 10 November 1967.

== Background ==
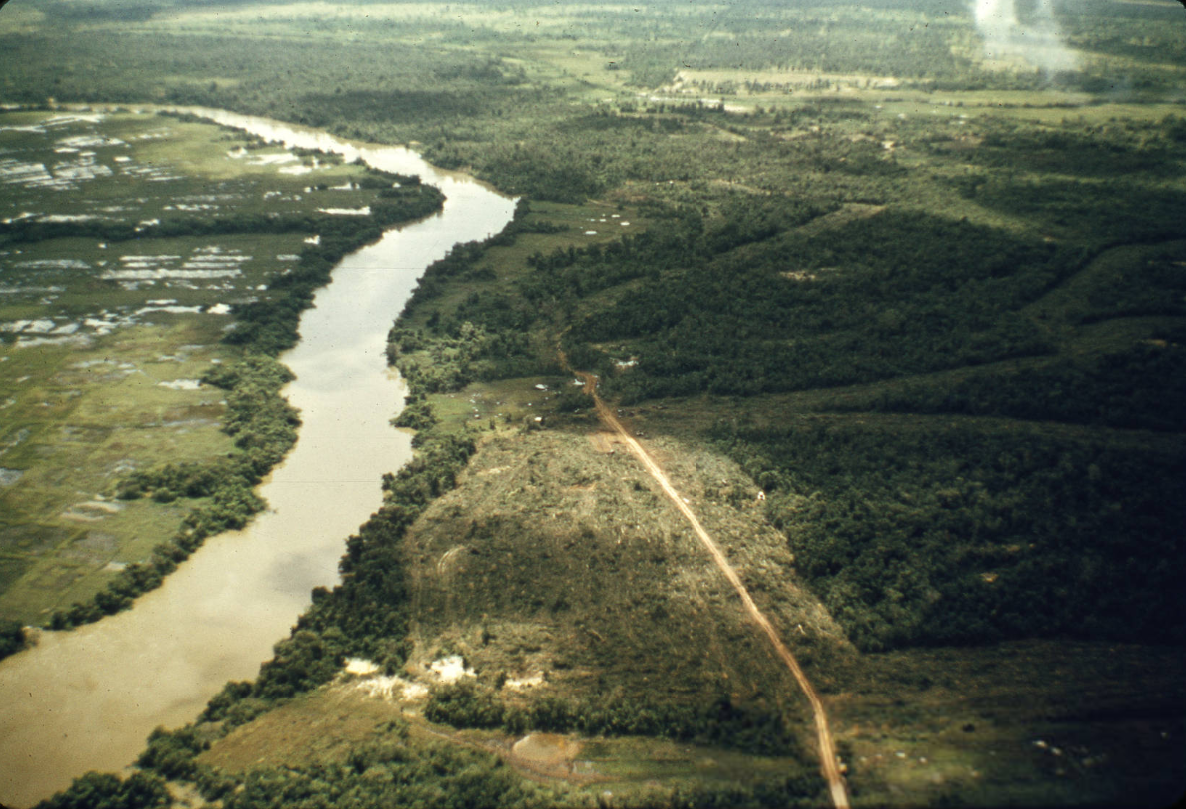
Kunia operational area, 24 September 1967

In September 1967 the 1st Brigade was assigned responsibility for destroying base areas in the Ho Bo Woods, which were believed to be sheltering the Viet Cong (VC) 1st and 7th Battalions. U.S. forces had last entered the area in June 1967 during Operation Manhattan.

The plan called for four artillery battalions to support the attack, two of which would establish firebases on Route 6A near the Saigon River. A battalion from the 3rd Brigade, 25th Infantry Division would form a screening force along the river and the 1st Brigade would then sweep through the woods. After eliminating any resistance, the 1st Brigade would provide security while the 168th Engineer Battalion would use Rome plows to clear the woods. The entire operation was to be completed by the end of October.

On 14 September the two artillery battalions moving along Route 6A became stuck in mud several kilometers from the planned firebase locations. The 4th Battalion, 23rd Infantry was deployed to protect the stranded convoy while it took two days for engineers to extract the bogged down vehicles and build a Corduroy road out of the area.

== Operation ==
After the delayed start, the sweep of the woods proceeded relatively uneventfully with occasional small engagements, sniper fire, mines and booby-traps. On 20 September the 168th Engineer Battalion began flattening the woods, being met with some mines and hit and run attacks resulting in 33 vehicles destroyed. Most resistance had been eliminated by mid-October and the clearing operation proceeded unimpeded, extending southeast into the Filhol Plantation. When tunnel complexes were located the engineers would pump water into the entrances, then wait several days for the structure to weaken before destroying them with explosives and artillery fire.

== Aftermath ==
Operation Kunia officially concluded on 31 October, with the US claiming VC losses were 105 killed, U.S. losses were 40 killed. Within two months of the end of the operation the VC had returned to the area which they used as a base for their Tet Offensive attacks.
