= Operation Manhattan =

Part of the Vietnam War (1967)

- Part of the Vietnam War
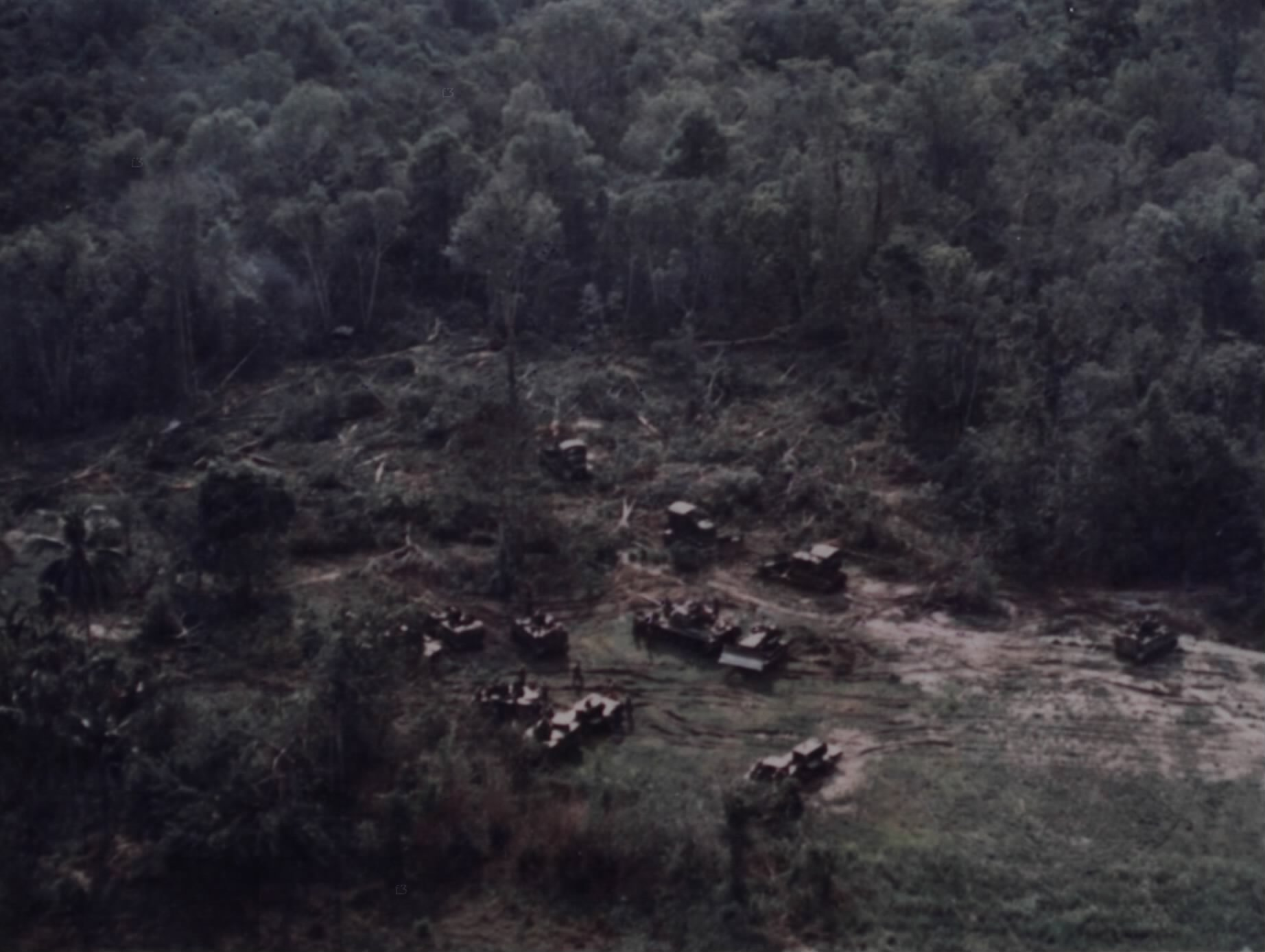
- The 1st Infantry Division jungle clearing team moves into the woods to destroy a Viet Cong bunker complex northwest of Saigon.
| Date | 23 April – 10 May (division operation ran until 7 June) 1967 |
| Location | Ho Bo Woods/Bến Củi, South Vietnam |

Belligerents
| United States; South Vietnam | Viet Cong |

Commanders and leaders
| MGen John C. F. Tillson | |

Units involved
| 1st Infantry Division: 3rd Brigade; 11th Armored Cavalry Regiment: 2 squadrons; Continuing Operation 25th Infantry Division: 1st Brigade; 2nd Brigade; 4th Infantry Division: 3rd Brigade | |

Casualties and losses
| 15 KIA; 133 WIA | See Aftermath |

Operation Manhattan was an operation conducted by IIFFV using the 3rd Brigade, 1st Infantry Division and two squadrons from the 11th Armored Cavalry Regiment. The IIFFV operation concluded on 10 May, but was continued as a division-level operation by the 1st and 2nd Brigades, 25th Infantry Division and the 3rd Brigade, 4th Infantry Division in the Ho Bo Woods/Bến Củi area, lasting from 23 April to 11 May. The division operation continued until 7 June 1967.

== Background ==
The initial operation was a sweep of a large area ("from the northwestern portion of the Iron Triangle to the Michelin Plantation and from the Saigon River east to Highway 13") with goal of weakening NVA and VC elements north of Saigon. The follow-on division-level operation targeted Vietcong (VC) bases in the Ho Bo Woods, Boi Loi Woods, Bến Củi area and along the Saigon River.

== Operation ==
The operation commenced on 23 April. On 9 May 2 Brigade, 25th Infantry Division withdrew from the operation and returned to Củ Chi Base Camp to prepare for Operation Kolekole. On 10 May 3rd Brigade, 1st Infantry Division withdrew from the operation and returned to Dầu Tiếng Base Camp to prepare for other operations. The 1st Brigade, 25th Infantry Division continued the operation, providing security for the 65th Engineer Battalion which used Rome plows to destroy VC fortifications when discovered.

== Aftermath ==
Operation Manhattan officially concluded on 11 May, with the 25th Infantry Division's continuation ending on 7 June. Reported VC losses during the first phase of Operation Manhattan (20 April to 10 May) were reported by the 1st Infantry division as 123 VC killed and 21 prisoners of war. They also reported capturing 347 rifles in one base camp, noted in one source as "the largest capture of enemy weapons by Americans in Vietnam." VC losses during the second (division-level) portion of the operation were 74 killed, with a further 99 estimated killed, 19 captured and three Chieu hoi. A total of 201 small arms and 18 crew-served weapons were captured. US losses were 15 killed in action and 133 wounded during the course of the initial operation (23 April to 10 May).
