= Sông Bé Base Camp =

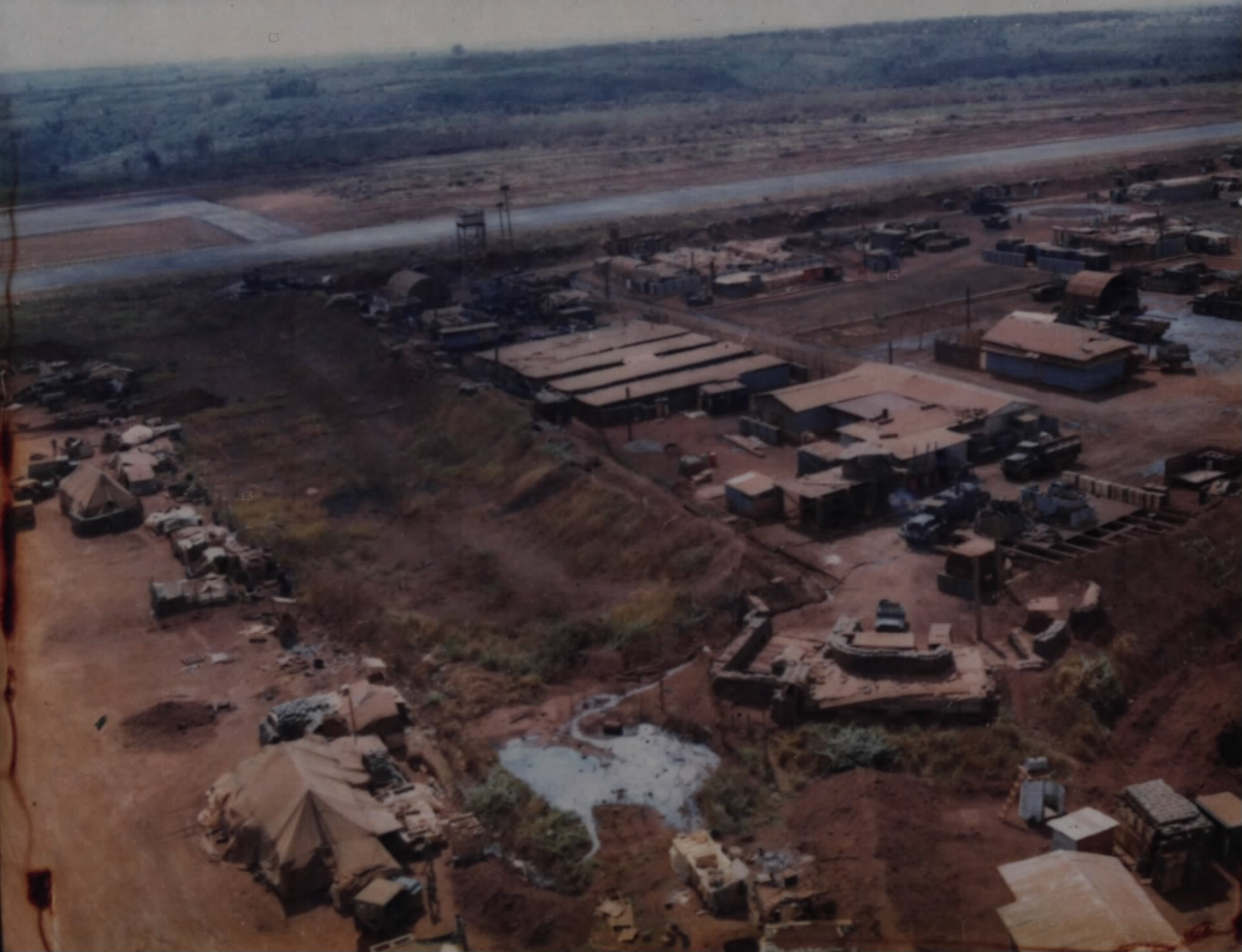
- Sông Bé Base Camp signal site, 10 January 1970

Site information
- Type: Army Base

Location
- Coordinates: 11.819°N 106.961°E

Site history
- Built: 1965
- In use: 1965-71
- Battles/wars: Vietnam War; Battle of Song Be

Garrison information
- Occupants: 199th Light Infantry Brigade; 1st Brigade, 1st Infantry Division; 2nd Brigade, 1st Cavalry Division

Sông Bé Airfield
- IATA: none; ICAO: none

Summary
- Elevation AMSL: 797 ft (243 m)
- Interactive map of Sông Bé Airfield

Runways
Direction	Length		Surface
Direction	ft	m	Surface
	3,400	1,036	PSP

Sông Bé Base Camp (also known as Sông Bé Airfield, Farley Field or Landing Zone Buttons) is a former U.S. Army and Army of the Republic of Vietnam base southwest of Phước Bình in southern Vietnam.

== History ==
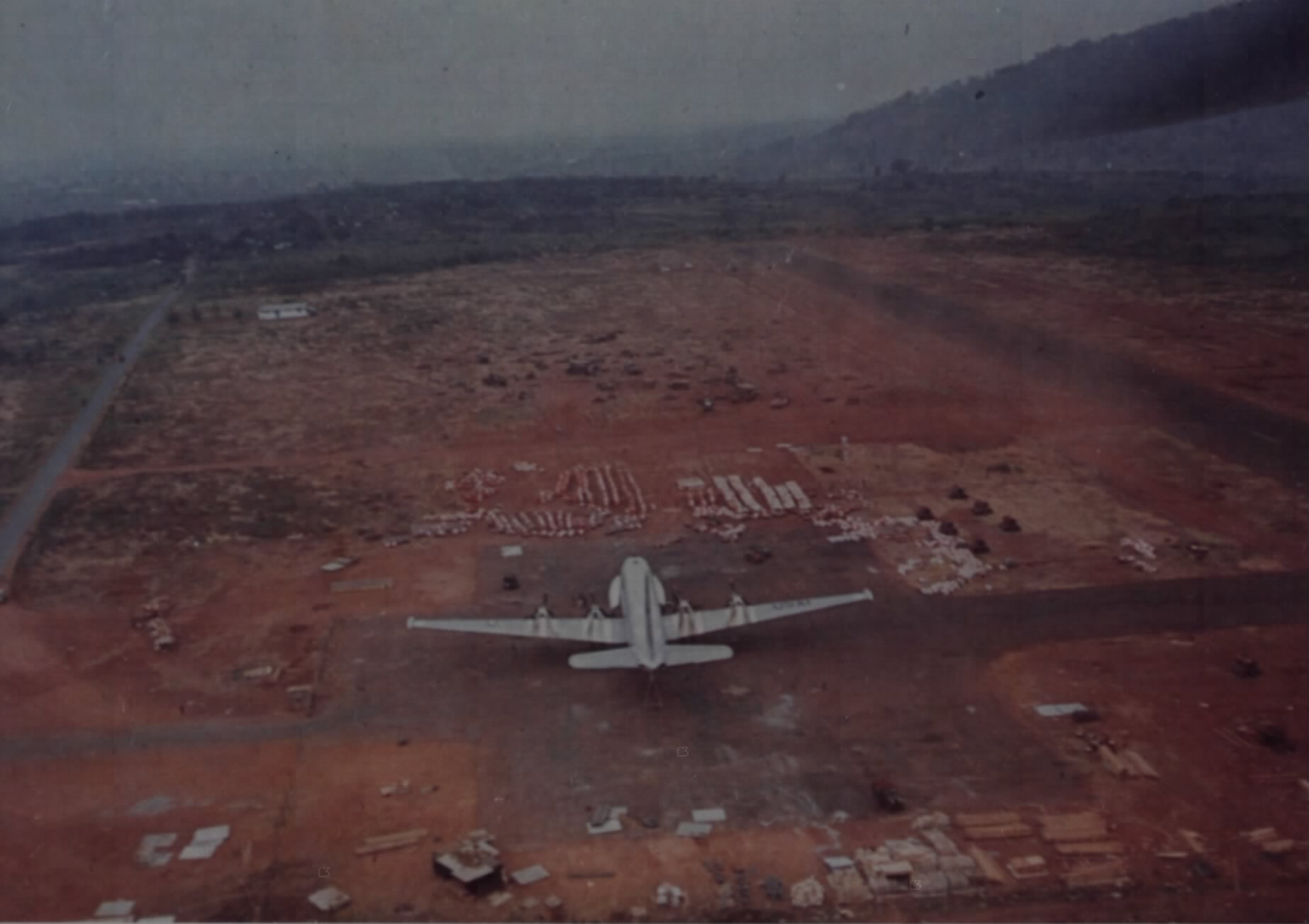
C-124 offloads engineering equipment at Sông Bé, 4 April 1967

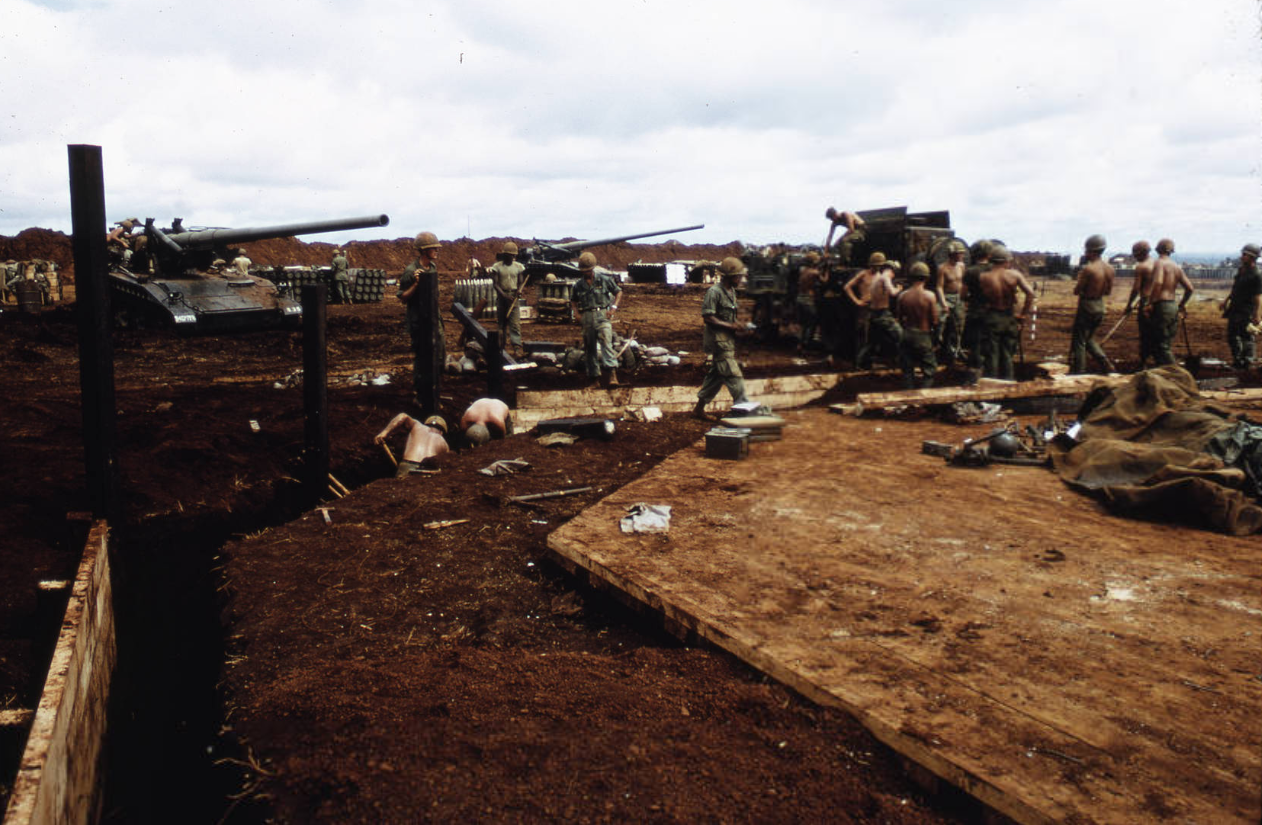
Artillery pad construction, 23 September 1967

The base was originally established in April 1965 as a 5th Special Forces Detachment B-34 base and was located approximately 2 km southwest of Phước Bình in Phước Long Province. The Battle of Song Be was fought around the base in May 1965.

On 10 April 1966 the 173rd Airborne Brigade moved to Sông Bé for Operation Denver and remained there until the end of April.

The 199th Light Infantry Brigade was based at Sông Bé from December 1966 to February 1967.

The 1st Brigade, 1st Infantry Division comprising:

- 1st Battalion, 2nd Infantry Regiment
- 1st Battalion, 26th Infantry Regiment
- 1st Battalion, 28th Infantry Regiment

was based at Sông Bé from May until June 1969.

The 1st Brigade, 101st Airborne Division was based at Sông Bé in January 1968.

In August 1969 Headquarters, 2nd Brigade, 1st Cavalry Division comprising:

- 5th Battalion, 7th Cavalry
- 1st Battalion, 12th Cavalry
- 2nd Battalion, 12th Cavalry

moved to Sông Bé and would stay here until March 1971.

Other units stationed at Sông Bé included:

- 2nd Battalion, 19th Artillery (1970)
- 2nd Battalion, 40th Artillery (1968)
- 1st Battalion, 77th Artillery
- 1st Squadron, 9th Cavalry
  - Alpha Troop

== Accidents and incidents ==
- 18 December 1974 Republic of Vietnam Air Force Lockheed C-130A Hercules #56-0521 was destroyed on the ground
- 25 December 1974 Republic of Vietnam Air Force C-130A #55-0016 was shot down while landing

28 October 1969, Huey from C company, 227 aviation battalion entered IFR during takeoff and impacted trees at the edge of the rubber plantation 400 m from FSB buttons. 5 KIA in the crash.

== Current use ==
The base is abandoned and turned over to housing but the former airfield is still clearly visible on satellite images.
