= II Corps (South Vietnam) =

Corps of the South Vietnamese Army

- Quân đoàn II
- Active: 1958–1975
- Disbanded: 2 April 1975
- Country: South Vietnam
- Branch: ARVN
- Type: Corps
- Garrison/HQ: Pleiku, Central Highlands
- Mottos: Thắng Không Kiêu, Bại Không Nản (No Arrogance in Victory, No Discouragement in Defeat)
- Engagements: Vietnam War

Commanders
- Notable commanders: Ngô Du; Nguyen Van Toan; Pham Van Phu

Insignia
- Unit flag

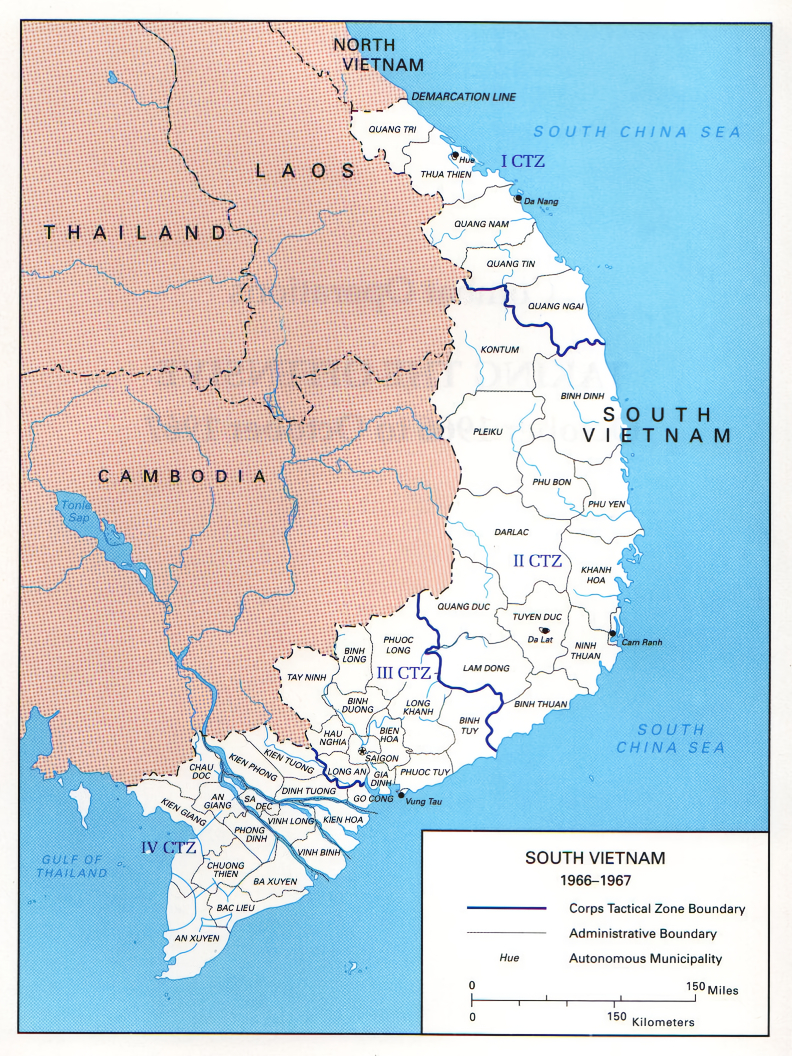
Map depicting the military regions of South Vietnam including II Corps

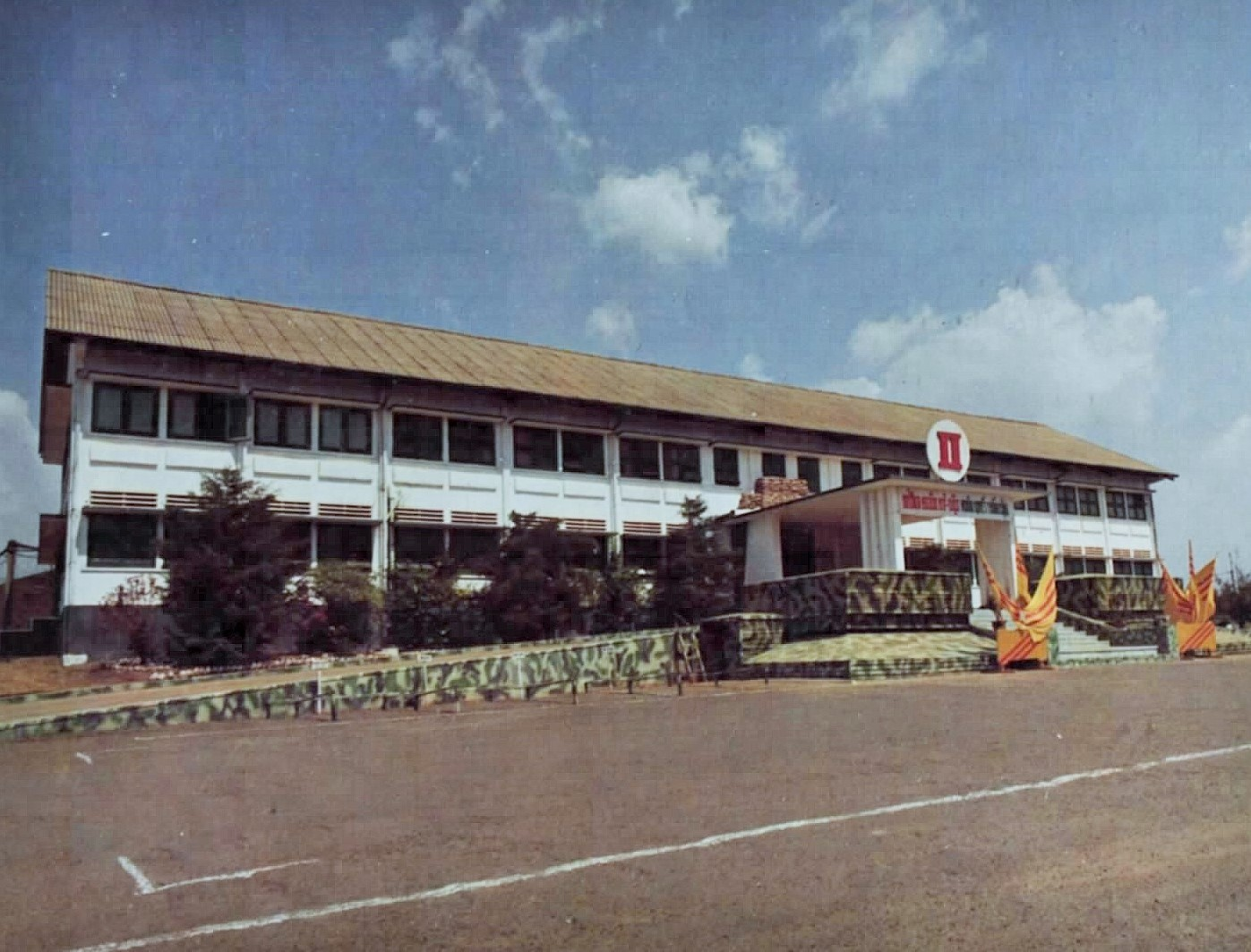
II Corps headquarters at Pleiku

The II Corps (Vietnamese: Quân đoàn II) was a corps of the Army of the Republic of Vietnam (ARVN), the army of the nation state of South Vietnam that existed from 1955 to 1975. It was one of four corps in the ARVN, and it oversaw the Central Highlands region, north of the capital Saigon. Its corps headquarters was in the mountain town of Pleiku.

== History ==
=== 1957-1963 ===
II Corps headquarters became operational in October 1957 and was responsible for the Central Highlands and the coastal region from southern Quang Nam province south to the town of Phan Thiet. II Corps headquarters was originally located at Ban Me Thuot in the Central Highlands, but was moved to Pleiku in mid-1959. Its assigned units were the 12th Light Division at Kontum, the 14th Light Division at Qui Nhon, the 15th Light Division at Duc My, the 3rd Field Division at Song Mao, and miscellaneous units stationed in the region. US advisors at II Corps headquarters consisted of about a dozen officers and enlisted men with a colonel of infantry as senior corps adviser, and two lieutenant colonels to advise the corps engineer, armor, ordnance, and Signal units.

=== 1964 ===
Following the 1963 South Vietnamese coup d'état, coup leader General Dương Văn Minh reassigned II Corps commander General Nguyễn Khánh to command I Corps, allegedly to get him as far from Saigon as possible. On 30 January 1964 Khánh overthrew Minh in a bloodless coup. By 6 March Khánh had replaced three of the four Corps commanders.

On 24 February 1964 Khánh issued the 1964 National Campaign Plan under the name Chien Thang (Struggle for Victory). Khanh decided the provinces surrounding Saigon would receive top priority in the distribution of troops, civil servants, and money. The rest of III Corps and IV Corps were next in the resource queue, whereas the provinces of II and I Corps had the lowest priority. One reason why the north received the least resources was that, at least before late 1963, it had appeared to be in the best shape. Thus, Chien Thang forecast that I and II Corps would be the first to enter into the final phase, the destruction of the enemy's last major formations and bases in January 1965, whereas III and IV Corps would not reach that point until January 1966.

The Diem regime's relative success in pacifying significant parts of I and II Corps had led to decisions in 1963 and 1964 to transfer troops to more troubled areas further south. This meant that troops were leaving just as the VC were increasing their efforts. Northern II Corps, like southern I Corps, was a long-standing revolutionary bastion and the VC had made deep penetrations in the last two months of 1963 following Diem's ouster.

In May 1964 the North Vietnamese politburo established three subordinate commands, including the Western Subregion, renamed the B–3 Front in September 1964, it encompassed the provinces of Kontum, Pleiku, and Darlac. The politburo envisioned it would be the decisive battle theater, where the Communists could best trap and destroy major government units before pushing down from the mountains and into the populated plains.

South Vietnam considered the Central Highlands of strategic importance too. The ARVN had considerable resources at their disposal and believed they outnumbered the VC by 4.6 to 1, but given the Corps' size, they had to spread their troops thinly. Corps commander General Đỗ Cao Trí positioned the 25th Division on the northern coast, the 22nd Division in the west, and the 23rd Division in the south. Corps' plans for 1964 were to focus initially on pacifying the densely populated north-south corridor that bordered Highway 1 and the railway, as well as communities along the zone’s three important east-west routes that connected the coast to the highlands, Highways 19, 20, and 21. Once Tri had secured the major communication axes, he planned to target the gaps between pacified areas, first on the coast and then in the piedmont. The Civil Guard would bear most of the population security burden at close-in communities, whereas the ARVN would perform operations on the fringes of populated areas, with occasional raids into the mountainous interior.

In late April 1964 II Corps launched Operation Quyet Thang 202, a successful assault on the VC's Do Xa stronghold that straddled Quang Ngai, Quang Tin, and Kontum provinces on the northern border of II Corps.

The VC summer offensive commenced in July 1964, lessened in August and then peaked in September. By summer’s end, advisers reported modest progress in pacification in five of the Corps' 11 provinces, however it had deteriorated significantly in four provinces — Pleiku, Quang Ngai, Binh Dinh, and Phu Yen.

On 19 September Montagnard irregulars in the Central Highlands mutinied, seizing several outposts and killing 73 people. The rebellion ended on 28 September when the rebels laid down their arms in exchange for amnesty and promises of future concessions.

Also in September the 25th Division began moving to III Corps' Hau Nghia Province to support Hop Tac pacification operations, leaving behind one of its regiments in Quang Ngai. Efforts to backfill the hole created in Quang Ngai by the division's transfer floundered, thereby contributing to the serious losses in population control that were already underway in that forlorn province. In hindsight, MACV commander General William Westmoreland believed it would have been better to have left the 25th Division in Quang Ngai and to have organized an entirely new division for service in III Corps. In addition, the Joint General Staff reassigned Lam Dong, Binh Thuan, and Binh Tuy provinces from III Corps to II Corps.

In late 1964, as monsoon flooding destabilized the countryside, small bands of VC continued to infiltrate into the lowlands to support local cadre in wresting control over rural communities. As in I Corps, Khanh's decision to funnel all recruits to III and IV Corps exacerbated the situation, undermining both morale and fighting strength. By October, II Corps had only 86% of its authorized manpower. Service and support units were near capacity, but combat units were at 46% strength. The Corps' Ranger battalions were particularly undermanned, leading Westmoreland to make a special appeal on their behalf. The loss of the 25th Division and the net gain of two additional provinces because of the corps boundary shifts worsened the situation further.

In October, the Corps' new commander, Major general Nguyễn Hữu Có, increased the number of battalions assigned to pacification duty from eight to ten, a considerable effort considering that he had just lost the 25th Division. Area control by saturation patrolling was the modus operandi for these units. During the month, nine of his provinces reported slight pacification gains and four—Binh Dinh, Phu Yen, Pleiku and Darlac—reported regression. However, the deterioration in security became so widespread through the Corps' northern tier that Có felt compelled to respond. He cut the number of battalions directly supporting pacification from ten to four. He then used the manpower freed from pacification duty to launch offensive operations that he hoped would drive the enemy's larger units out of populated areas, thus gaining some breathing room. Monsoon damage and increased VC attacks impacted Binh Dinh province severely.

Westmoreland blamed himself for the deterioration that had occurred in the northern and central coastal provinces. At his urging, the South Vietnamese had dispersed much of their forces to support pacification, only to be overrun by main force enemy units. Population control was assessed to have declined from 76% in January to 51% in December.

By the end of 1964 a US Army helicopter aviation company or US Marine Corps helicopter squadron was assigned in direct support of each Vietnamese infantry division. Further fixed-wing transport, reconnaissance, and observation aircraft were available as well. As a result, each senior Corps adviser had between 70 and 100 aircraft at his disposal, with MACV retaining control over the rest.

=== 1965 ===
January 1965 was relatively quiet in II Corps. Có took advantage of the respite to double the number of battalions assigned to province chiefs for pacification from nine to 18, while launching 30 operations involving a battalion or more.

By the end of the Tết holiday in early February, Military Region 5 and the B–3 Front were ready to launch a new surge in the winter-spring offensive. Their goal was to carve up South Vietnam into several isolated blocks. Northern II Corps would once again be the focal point of this effort. First, the VC wanted to cut South Vietnam in two by controlling a stretch of land from the Cambodian border to the sea that ran through Kontum, Pleiku, and Binh Dinh provinces in II Corps and Quang Ngai province in I Corps. Second, they planned to isolate the western highlands from the populated eastern lowlands by interdicting Highway 19.

The VC began its new wave of attacks in the early hours of 7 February. The first targets were transportation facilities such as roads, railroads, airfields, and fuel depots. The VC damaged or destroyed 15 railroad bridges in northern II Corps and I Corps. In Phu Yen, they attacked Chop Chai airfield and destroyed 331 barrels of fuel at Tuy Hoa. With these actions, the VC hoped to impede the allies' ability to respond to the coming offensive in the north. The Attack on Camp Holloway killed seven Americans, destroyed ten helicopters and damaged 15 more. On 10 February a VC sapper attack in Qui Nhon killed 21 US soldiers and 11 South Vietnamese civilians.

On 16 February a US Medevac helicopter discovered a heavily-armed trawler in Vũng Rô Bay near Tuy Hoa. The discovery showed that the North Vietnamese were using coastal infiltration to resupply the VC.

From 20 to 24 February Có launched an operation to reopen Highway 19 which had been closed by the VC since 30 January. The PAVN/VC defeated the ARVN forces and Highway 19 wouldn't be reopened until mid-March.

Binh Dinh remained the focus of the VC offensive. Since 7 February, the VC had captured 131 hamlets in the province, and the population had lost faith in the government’s ability to protect it. Thousands of refugees fled the VC in northern Binh Dinh, leaving them in near total control. In MACV's opinion, government control in Binh Dinh had dwindled to 21% of the population and 10% of the land.

On 8 March the VC launched an unsuccessful attack on the Kannak CIDG camp on Highway 19, losing 131 dead and 65 weapons. The CIDG troops lost 33 dead and three US Army Special Forces soldiers were killed. On 9 March a VC attack on Ha Tay resulted in more than 200 VC killed, while an attempt to seize and hold Hoai An town was defeated. These attacks marked the crescendo of the VC offensive.

On 26 March the 21st Ranger Battalion engaged an enemy force west of Highway 14 near the Laotian border. The five-day skirmish killed 82 PAVN/VC for the loss of 24 Rangers killed and seven missing. The action confirmed that the PAVN 101st Regiment was now fighting in South Vietnam.

By the end of March, the immediate threat of the VC splitting South Vietnam had passed, but the price had been high. In addition to the casualties suffered, the winter- spring offensive had forced Có to divert troops from pacification. He had reduced the number of regulars assigned to province chiefs from 18 battalions in January to ten in February and to zero in March. The move weakened the already hard-pressed pacification effort. By the end of March, the government admitted the presence of more than 90,000 refugees in II Corps and continued to be hard-pressed to deal with them. 70,000 refugees were in Binh Dinh, where the allies believed the VC maintained 3,600 regulars and 3,000 guerrillas. During the first three months of 1965, the VC had been able to enlarge the segment of the rural population under its control in the Corps from 17% to 22%. The government, on the other hand, claimed it controlled 35% of the Corps' 2.8 million people and maintained some influence over another 19%.

The infusion of North Vietnamese regulars and new weaponry, such as fully automatic rifles and antitank weapons, had altered the situation in II Corps. The morale of South Vietnamese soldiers dropped noticeably. Army Chief of Staff Harold K. Johnson, who visited II Corps in March, found Có "very distraught" by the fact that enemy soldiers armed with AK-47s were outgunning his units. Johnson sympathized, adding that "they just didn't have the ability to absorb that shock of initial contact."

In April, Westmoreland convinced the JGS to order the commanders of I, II, and IV Corps to develop Hop Tac-style pacification programs for their areas. After receiving joint MACV-JGS briefings about the program, the commanders presented their plans on 3 May. II Corps was to create a Hop Tac program centered on Qui Nhon.

Có's top priority in the spring of 1965 was to keep II Corps' roads open. This was no mean task, as VC throughout the region threatened the country's economic and political viability by harassing traffic, destroying bridges, and erecting obstacles. The decline in the frequency and magnitude of VC actions that had become apparent in March continued and this allowed Có to increase the number of infantry battalions assigned to support pacification from zero in March to six in April and 15 in May. However, the VC was not always obliging, particularly in the north. There, the threat, boosted by PAVN troops, led Có to create the 24th Special Tactical Zone, consisting of Kontum, Pleiku, and Phu Bon. The zone had its own commander who drew most of his troops from the 22nd Division. This allowed the 22nd Division commander, General Nguyen Thanh Sang, to concentrate the remainder of the division in Binh Dinh. Sang's focus was keeping Highway 19 open in the highlands and reopening Highway 1 to I Corps.

In mid-1965 the VC planned make the northern half of South Vietnam—and particularly the area of southern I Corps and northern II Corps—the focal point for their new offensive. The summer offensive began later in II Corps as the VC wanted to make sure that the southwest monsoon season was in full swing in the Central Highlands before launching their attacks, with heavy rain and low cloud complicating ground movement and air support.

In anticipation of the onslaught, representatives from MACV and the JGS met with II Corps' new commanding officer, Major general Nguyễn Phước Vĩnh Lộc, appointed on 23 June to replace Có. The conferees opted for a defensive strategy in the highlands. Garrisons would hold out for as long as possible to delay the VC and inflict maximum casualties before withdrawing. The allies would mount relief efforts only for critical installations. To prioritize the defense, the US senior adviser drew up a document that evaluated the "military worth" of every post and town. The allied officers then identified air and ground reaction forces from Corps- and national-level assets that commanders could commit to address emergencies. They then waited for the rains, and the offensive, to begin.

On 1 June the VC overran Le Thanh District 63km west of Pleiku. It was decided to abandon the district other than Đức Cơ Camp, which became the sole position blocking the VC's use of Highway 19 between Cambodia and Pleiku and the VC began a siege of the camp that would continue until August. Unable to hold the vast but sparsely populated Central Highlands, the South Vietnamese ceded ground. By mid-July 1965, the government had lost or abandoned six district capitals and swaths of the highlands' territory. Aviation was the only way to resupply areas still under government control, as the VC had cut roads across the highlands. Military morale sank, and panic spread throughout the populace.

On 1 July the 3rd Battalion, 7th Marines was landed at Qui Nhon to secure the port and logistics facilities there, they would later be replaced by the 2nd Battalion, 7th Marines.

On 12 July the US 1st Battalion, 18th Infantry Regiment, and an artillery battery disembarked at Cam Ranh Bay to provide security for the new port being built there.

On 17 July the 22nd Division and eight reserve battalions launched Operation Than Phong to reopen Highway 19 and deliver supplies to Pleiku. Resistance proved light, and after troops had secured Highway 19, vehicles drawn from every possible source delivered 3,000 tons of supplies to Pleiku. From there, aircraft and trucks brought succor to other government-controlled areas. Public confidence in the highlands rose, and food prices dropped by as much as 30 percent.

Throughout the Corps, the VC pressured the South Vietnamese with guerrilla attacks, political and terrorist actions, and the occasional large engagement to erode the government’s presence in the countryside. Boosting the rise in activity were the enemy's growing numbers. Not counting guerrillas, the B–3 Front now had 44,500 regulars in II Corps, including three PAVN regiments, three VC regiments, twelve independent battalions, and numerous smaller units, with three more battalions suspected but not confirmed. II Corps was forced to cut the number of battalions assigned to support pacification from 15 in May to eight in June and four in July.

On 29 July, the 1st Brigade, 101st Airborne Division landed at Cam Ranh Bay and then established their base at Dong Ba Thin Base Camp.

Following the losses caused by the winter-spring offensive of 1964–1965, the 1965 summer offensive confronted the allies with a stark situation in II Corps. Four of the Corps' provinces, Pleiku, Phu Bon, Darlac, and Khanh Hoa, had experienced significant degradations. Advisers in the Corps' remaining provinces indicated that their situations had not changed materially. The PAVN/VC had destroyed 312 New Life hamlets in II Corps during the first six months of 1965. In June alone, the Corps had lost 177,000 people and 280 of the Corps' 2,061 hamlets. Through the first half of the year, the government also had lost control of about 9% of the population it once had considered secure. The fact that 40% of this loss had occurred in June indicated the sizable impact of the summer offensive. II Corps was looking increasingly like an archipelago of isolated government-controlled islands in a hostile sea.

In early August intelligence indicated that an attack on Đức Cơ Camp by the PAVN 32nd Regiment was imminent. In response, Lộc directed two task forces-each roughly two battalions strong-to relieve the camp. On 3 August one moved by air directly to Đức Cơ. The other, an armored group, would take Highway 19 to the hamlet of Thanh Binh, about halfway between Pleiku and Đức Cơ. After securing the town, it would continue westward, clearing the road to the camp. From 4 to 9 August the two task forces implemented the plan. The one operating near Đức Cơ clashed intermittently with an unidentified PAVN unit, but the other en route to Thanh Binh ran into an ambush. Although gunships and fighter-bombers responded quickly, the situation appeared bleak. Lộc had only two Marine battalions in reserve. If he committed them to the relief of Đức Cơ, Pleiku City would stand unguarded. Asserting that no troops were available, the JGS turned to Westmoreland for assistance. Westmoreland immediately agreed to move the 173rd Airborne Brigade to Thanh Binh. If the PAVN lingered near Đức Cơ, the brigade would join the fight. By deploying the brigade Westmoreland hoped to "eliminate any and all excuses" for why the South Vietnamese should not seek out and destroy the enemy." The brigade's move to the highlands was swift. By 11 August the 1st and 2nd Battalions, 503rd Infantry Regiment, had reached Pleiku and moved into the field. For this offensive they would be under the operational control of the newly activated tactical command in II Corps, Task Force Alpha, at Nha Trang. With American forces nearby, Lộc could attack toward Đức Cơ. Once in position, brigade elements conducted patrols and airmobile assaults to hold open a mountain pass near Thanh Binh, but they hardly saw the enemy, who chose to withdraw in the face of a superior force. On 17 August, with no one left to fight, Lộc's units began to pull back to Pleiku via Highway 19 without incident. Remaining in the Highlands for the rest of August and into early September, the 173d operated mainly around Pleiku city, except for a detachment that searched north into Kontum province in late August. When the patrols produced no significant contact with the enemy, the brigade returned to Bien Hoa.

From 22-26 August the 1st Brigade, 101st Airborne Division conducted Operation Highland to secure the An Khe area and Highway 19 in preparation for the arrival of the 1st Cavalry Division (Airmobile).

On 6 September the first troopships carrying the 1st Cavalry Division (Airmobile) arrived at Qui Nhon and by 1 October the division was established at its camp near An Khe.

From 18-19 September the US 2nd Battalion, 502nd Infantry Regiment and Rangers fought the VC 2nd Regiment, 3rd Division in the Battle of An Ninh.

On 22 September the first elements of the South Korean Capital (Tiger) Division began arriving at Qui Nhon. The division would be based just outside Qui Nhon at Camp Thunderbolt in Bình Định province, from where it could protect vital arteries such as Highway 1 and Highway 19, as well as rice-growing areas and foothills to the north and west.

On 29 September the 1st Battalion, 18th Infantry ceded its mission at Cam Ranh to the 1st Brigade, 101st Airborne Division, and rejoined the rest of its regiment at Bien Hoa.

In late September the South Korean 2nd Marine Brigade (Blue Dragons began arriving at Cam Ranh Bay.

On 19 October the PAVN began the Siege of Plei Me which continued until the 25th. In the aftermath of the siege the 1st Cavalry Division pursued the PAVN in the Pleiku campaign, culminating in the Battle of Ia Drang from 14 to 18 November.

On 4 November, with the ROK Tiger Division taking responsibility for security, the 2nd Battalion, 7th Marines was redeployed from Qui Nhon to Chu Lai.

On 24 December the first elements of the US 3rd Brigade, 25th Infantry Division began arriving in Vietnam and were deployed to Pleiku.

By late 1965, Westmoreland regarded the II Corps' leadership as shaky. He had passed on his dissatisfaction with Lộc, to the government and JGS several times, characterizing Lộc's abilities as "marginal" and his retention "a calculated risk." Westmoreland felt that the isolated highlands was an allied weak point and expected heavy fighting there. Advisory assessments of Lộc's two infantry division commanders, Generals Nguyen Thanh Sang of the 22nd Division and Nguyễn Văn Mạnh of the 23rd, were more favorable, but advisers judged the regimental commanders as poor and gave high marks only to the head of the remote 24th Special Tactical Zone.

In the Combined Campaign Plan for 1966, which the JGS and MACV issued in December, the allies declared their "basic objective" for the year to be clearing, securing, and developing the heavily populated regions around Saigon, in the Mekong Delta, and in selected portions of the I and II Corps coastal plain. "Coincident" with this effort, they would defend significant outlying government and population centers and conduct search and destroy operations against "major VC/PAVN forces." In pursuit of these objectives, South Vietnamese forces would concentrate on defending, clearing, and securing the designated strategic areas. American and third-country forces, besides securing their own bases and helping to protect rice-producing areas, were to "conduct operations outside of the secure areas against VC forces and bases." Implicit in these words was the defacto division of labor between the South Vietnamese and Americans that had been in effect since the summer.

=== 1966 ===
From 15 January to 25 February, the 1st Brigade, 101st Airborne Division conducted Operation Van Buren, a harvest security operation in the Tuy Hòa Valley, Phú Yên Province.

From 27 January to 6 March the 1st Cavalry Division, the 22nd Division and the ROK Capital Division conducted Operation Masher in Bình Định province.

On 22 February the government established a Special Commissariat for Montagnard Affairs headed by Paul Nur, a respected French-educated administrator of Montagnard descent. Shortly thereafter, Nur and Lộc, agreed upon a package of economic, social, and administrative reforms for the Montagnard tribes. Lộc promised to increase the number of Montagnard civil servants, to reestablish tribal courts, and to widen educational and medical services for the Montagnards. He also promised to resolve the long-standing issue of land ownership by granting land titles to the Highland tribes. However, the government did little to implement these agreements.

From 25 February to 25 March the 3rd Brigade, 25th Infantry Division conducted Operation Garfield in Darlac province.

From 26 February to 25 March the 1st Brigade, 101st Airborne Division conducted Operation Harrison in Phú Yên Province.

On 11 March, junta leader Nguyễn Cao Kỳ removed his political rival General Nguyễn Chánh Thi as commander of I Corps, sparking the Buddhist Uprising. In early May Colonel John F. Freund, MACV's special assistant for the South Vietnamese armed forces, toured the II Corps headquarters at Pleiku, where he learned that the deputy Buddhist chaplain, Thich Ho Giac, had visited the city on 27 April and had spoken to troops of the 3rd Armored Cavalry Squadron. Ho, according to Freund's sources, had stressed three themes: that South Vietnamese soldiers should lay down their arms; that the objectives of the war were solely American; and that China, not North Vietnam, was the real enemy. Meanwhile Lộc stated publicly that he was neither for Thi nor Kỳ, which raised the possibility of his defecting too.

From 25 March to 8 April the 1st Cavalry Division conducted Operation Lincoln west of Pleiku.

26 March to 21 July the 1st Brigade, 101st Airborne Division conducted Operation Fillmore in Phú Yên province.

From 1-16 May the 3rd Brigade, 1st Cavalry Division conducted Operation Davy Crockett near Bong Son.

From 10 May to 31 July the 3rd Brigade, 25th Infantry Division conducted Operation Paul Revere west of Pleiku.

From 16 May to 5 June the 1st Brigade, 1st Cavalry Division conducted Operation Crazy Horse in Vĩnh Thạnh district, Binh Dinh province.

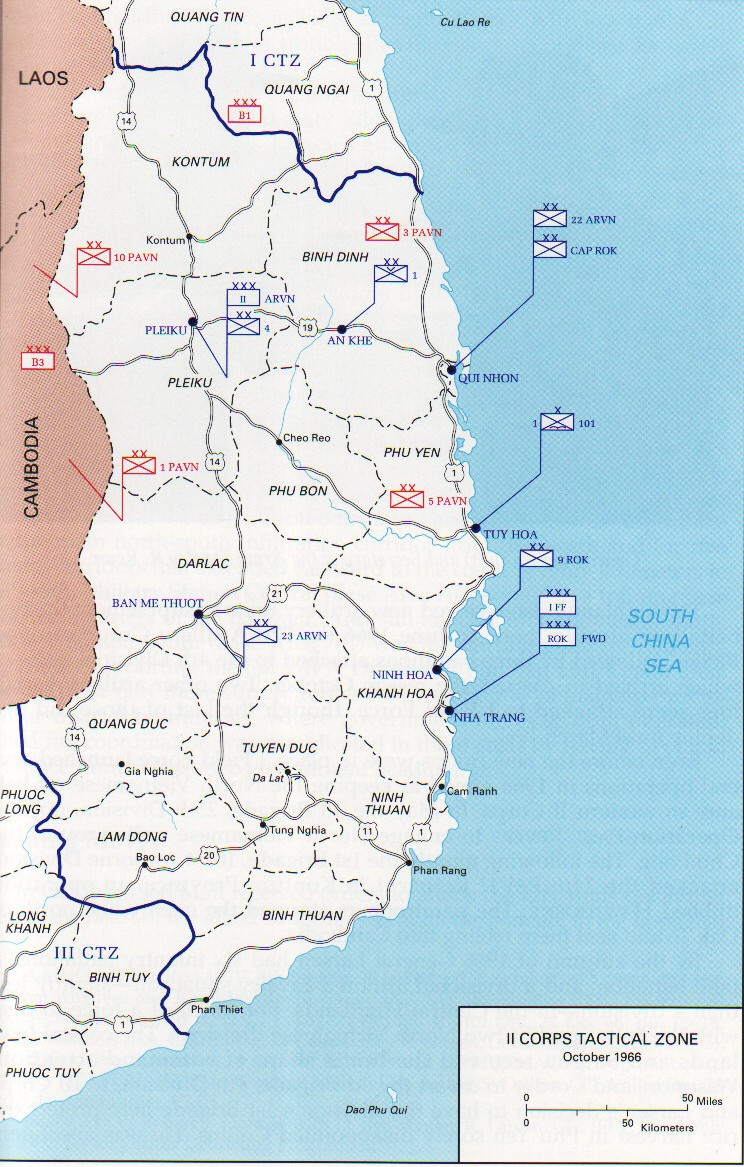
II Corps in October 1966

In early June, in order to relieve the PAVN siege of elements of the 42nd Regiment, 22nd Division under siege at Toumorong, the US 101st Airborne and the rest of the 42nd Regiment and 21st Rangers conducted Operation Hawthorne from 2-21 June.

In May the US 1st Battalion, 69th Armor Regiment was moved from III Corps to Qui Nhon.

From 19-30 June the 1st Cavalry Division conducted Operation Nathan Hale in western Phú Yên province.

On 23 June government troops and police swept through the Buddhist Institute in Saigon, eliminating the last stronghold of the Buddhist leaders. The Thiệu-Kỳ regime successfully tested its power against the Buddhists and a popular Corps commander and, as a consequence, seemed to increase its political standing. While the government agreed to hold elections for a constituent assembly, it successfully resisted demands to have the projected assembly replace the Kỳ government. The crisis also marked the last stand of the Buddhists as an intermediate political force, leaving the Vietnamese people little choice between the Saigon generals on one end of the political spectrum and the VC on the other.

From 21 July to 5 September the 1st Brigade, 101st Airborne Division conducted Operation John Paul Jones in Phú Yên province.

In July a battalion of the US 2nd Brigade, 4th Infantry Division arrived in Vietnam and was deployed to Pleiku. The rest of the division, less its 3rd Brigade and its armor component which were sent to III Corps, arrived in August-October.

On 9/10 August the South Korean 9th Company, 3rd Battalion, 1st Armored Regiment and 1st Platoon, Company A, 1st Battalion, 69th Armor Regiment defeated a PAVN attack in the Battle of Đức Cơ.

In August, the South Korean 2nd Marine Brigade redeployed from Tuy Hoa north to Chu Lai in southern I Corps.

From 25 August 1966 to 1 December 1967 the 2nd Battalion, 7th Cavalry Regiment and the ARVN 44th Regiment conducted Operation Byrd an area security operation in Bình Thuận province.

In early September the South Korean 9th Infantry Division (White Horse), arrived in II Corps, its mission to clear and hold contested territory and safeguard bases in Phu Yen, Khanh Hoa, and Ninh Thuan provinces.

From 5-25 September the 1st Brigade, 101st Airborne Division conducted Operation Seward in Phú Yên province.

From 13 September to 11 February 1967 the 1st Cavalry Division, 22nd Division and ROK Capital Division conducted Operation Thayer/Irving in Bình Định province.

In October a prisoner of war camp was opened in Pleiku.

From 20 October to 30 December US forces conducted Operation Paul Revere IV in the Plei Trap Valley.

From 31 October to 4 December the 1st Brigade, 4th Infantry Division, the 1st Brigade 101st Airborne Division, the Korean 28th Infantry Regiment, 9th Division and the 47th Infantry Regiment, 22nd Division conducted Operation Geronimo against the PAVN 18B Regiment west of Tuy Hoa.

In November 1966, MACV and the JGS released their new combined campaign plan. It reflected the division of labor already in effect. The plan divided South Vietnam into three mission-oriented areas. Critical were those designated as "National Priority Areas" and "Areas of Priority for Military Offensive Operations." The remainder constituted a mix of sparsely inhabited regions of less military consequence or areas where weather, terrain, or troop strength limited allied effectiveness, such as those opposite the DMZ or along the Laotian border. The two priority categories comprised about half of South Vietnam and included about 77% of its population, 85% of its food production, and 75% of its roads. According to MACV, these areas also contained 77% of the enemy's conventional units and 43% of his bases Ostensibly, South Vietnamese forces would have primary responsibility for providing security in the National Priority Areas-heavily populated zones with reasonably good road and water networks. For this mission, all ARVN regular infantry battalions were to receive special revolutionary development, or pacification, training during 1966 and 1967, and at least half were to be assigned direct pacification support or security missions as soon as possible. Meanwhile, the more mobile American forces would take the fight to the enemy in the less accessible Areas of Priority for Military Offensive Operations. Only in IV Corps were both securing and offensive missions given to South Vietnamese commanders. While the South Vietnamese would pursue a strategy of pacification, US forces would follow one of attrition. The combined campaign plan for 1966-1967 gave all coastal provinces "priority" for the new offensive but had declared only the regions around Da Nang and Qui Nhon "national priority areas," since the South Vietnamese military was too weak to accomplish more.

=== 1967 ===
On 5 January the ROK 26th Regiment, Capital Division launched Operation Maeng Ho 8 moving south from Qui Nhon toward Phu Yen, resulting in over 150 VC killed.

On 26 January the ROK 9th Division launched Operation Baek Ma I in northern Khanh Hoa province, resulting in over 400 VC killed or captured.

From 12 February to 5 April the 4th Infantry Division conducted Operation Sam Houston in the Plei Trap Valley.

From 12 February to 19 January 1968 the 1st Cavalry Division, the 3rd Brigade, 25th Infantry Division, the ROK Capital Division and the 22nd Division conducted Operation Pershing in Bình Định province.

From 8 March to 18 April the ROK Capital and 9th Divisions conducted Operation Oh Jak Kyo to link up the two divisions' tactical area of responsibility in Phú Yên province, resulting in 831 VC killed and 659 weapons captured.

By April the attrited VC 3rd Division departed the Binh Dinh plain and local VC forces were also in disarray. The province's Hamlet Evaluation System (HES), report estimated that 68 percent (660,000) of the people of Binh Dinh lived in areas under government control; another 14 percent resided in contested areas; while the remaining 18 percent still lived in regions under VC domination.

From 6 April to 11 October the 4th Infantry Division and 173rd Airborne Brigade conducted Operation Francis Marion in Pleiku, Darlac and Kon Tum provinces.

Beginning in May the B3 Front began a buildup aimed at drawing the US forces back into the border areas, where prowling PAVN forces could attack them at will. Even after three US campaigns in the highlands in two years, the PAVN presence in the region was as strong as ever. In addition to sapper, artillery, and several independent PAVN and VC battalions, the B3 Front had six main force regiments at its disposal. The 32nd, 66th, and 88th, belonged to the 1st Division and were deployed in Cambodian Base Areas 701 and 702. The remaining regiments were operating independently - the 24th in northern Kontum Province, the 95B in Pleiku Province, and the 33rd in northern Darlac. In midsummer a seventh regular regiment, the 174th, joined the 24th in Kontum. Hanoi expected the B3 Front to use those assets as it always had-to draw the Americans away from the populated coast and into the rugged border regions where it could inflict heavy casualties.

From 26 May to 27 January 1968 elements of the 1st Cavalry Division and the 816th and then 222nd National Police Field Force Battalion conducted Operation Dragnet against the VC infrastructure in Binh Dinh province. The operation led to the capture of 944 VC, including 191 cadre and 223 VC killed and 625 captured for the loss of 12 cavalrymen.

From 17 June to 11 October the 173rd Airborne Brigade and 42nd Regiment conducted Operation Greeley in Kontum province.

The PAVN had repeatedly lured the allies into the border wilderness. Although 4th Division policy would continue to dictate prompt action against all major enemy forces found entering the South, 4th Division commander General William R. Peers had grown increasingly wary of fighting on the border. I Field Force commander General Stanley R. Larsen, on the other hand, still supported the border engagement policy, and it remained in place until his midsummer departure from I Field Force.

From 9 July to 26 August the ROK Capital and Tiger divisions conducted Operation Hong Kil Dong against the PAVN base area known as the Hub, west of Tuy Hoa.

In August Lieutenant general William B. Rosson, the US senior adviser and the senior American commander in the II Corps area, was hopeful. Combined operations between American and the South Vietnamese forces in the highlands and the South Vietnamese revolutionary development training programs for both regular and territorial units along the coast were proving beneficial. Although nepotism and corruption were still serious problems, Lộc had firm control over the province chiefs and was loyal to the Saigon regime. Lộc's frequent consultations with Montagnard leaders also enhanced his stature and promised stability in this area.

From 19 September to 31 January 1969 the 503rd Infantry Regiment conducted Operation Bolling in Phú Yên province west of Tuy Hoa.

In October the PAVN 18B Regiment left its mountain bases for the coast to launch its first offensive campaign in over a year. The 18B sent two battalions to seize hamlets around Ninh Hòa, a district capital 25km north of Nha Trang. When the Koreans reacted, they found the PAVN using the inhabitants as human shields. The South Korean commander attempted to separate the noncombatants from the enemy troops. After three days of bitter small unit fighting, the Koreans regained control of the area, but took heavy casualties. A week later the PAVN returned and reoccupied two of the hamlets. The Koreans had had enough, as at Tuy Hoa, they sat back and watched as artillery and air strikes obliterated the hamlets.

Three weeks later the 18B's uncommitted battalion mortared Nha Trang Air Base, seized two hamlets west of the city, and sent six sapper teams to destroy military facilities within the city limits. Prompt reaction by the allies forced the PAVN to retreat, but the psychological impact was severe. No PAVN/VC force had directly threatened Nha Trang in two years. The fact that they could still penetrate the city's defenses immediately lowered confidence in the central government.

In October MACV and South Vietnamese commands finalized plans for the upcoming year. Although pacification activities occurred in every province in South Vietnam, the Combined Campaign Plan for 1968 (AB 143) continued the previous year's program of concentrating resources on 26 of South Vietnam's 44 provinces. Omitted were areas where the enemy's military forces were strongest or that were remote and sparsely populated, such as the Central Highlands. The 1968 plan called for the greatest effort to be made in areas close to Saigon, with the rest of the country receiving progressively fewer resources the farther north or south one traveled from that location. The MACV and Vietnamese staffs further decided that for 1968 they would focus the pacification effort on two types of areas. First, they wished to solidify control over areas in which the South Vietnamese government already held some sway. Second, they wanted to target areas where a significant number of people could be added to the rolls of those living under government authority without expanding allied resources over a large physical area. Military plans reflected the pacification design. The 1968 Campaign Plan designated most of the pacification priority provinces as priority areas for offensive military operations. Other areas targeted for offensive action were the western sectors of Kontum and Pleiku provinces. Disrupting the enemy in these areas would both shield pacification efforts in the more populated areas and pave the way for geographical expansion in the future. The allies planned only minimal operations in sparsely populated areas like the center of the country. Since the areas the allies planned to target in 1968 were similar to those of 1967, little movement of forces was needed to execute the AB 143 plan. Two US brigades would continue to screen the frontier in the highland provinces of Kontum and Pleiku, while a similarly sized force helped protect the heavily populated, rice-producing coastal lowlands.

From 12 October to 31 January 1969 the 4th Infantry Division and ARVN forces conducted Operation MacArthur in western Kontum and Pleiku provinces.

From 3 to 23 November the 4th Infantry Division, 173rd Airborne Brigade, 42nd Infantry Regiment and Airborne units fought the PAVN 1st Division in the Battle of Dak To.

From 1 December to 8 January 1968 the 2nd Battalion, 7th Cavalry, the 1st Brigade, 101st Airborne Division, three battalions of the 44th Regiment and a Ranger battalion conducted Operation Klamath Falls along the border between Binh Thuan and Lam Dong provinces.

From 6 to 20 December the 1st Brigade, 1st Cavalry Division, 1st Battalion, 50th Infantry Regiment, 40th Regiment and 3rd and 4th Marine Battalions fought the PAVN 22nd Regiment in the Battle of Tam Quan in Bình Định province.

From 17 December to 6 January 1968 the ROK 1st Regiment, Capital Division and ARVN forces conducted Operation Maeng Ho 9 against the PAVN E2B Battalion and the 18th Regiment in southern Binh Dinh province, killing 299 PAVN and capturing 84.

By the end of 1967 the Hamlet Evaluation System reported that the proportion of II Corps' population living under government control had risen from 72.6% in January to 75.8% in December. In Khanh Hoa, Ninh Thuan, and Binh Thuan Provinces, 90, 90, and 87% of the population, respectively, living in relative security. In Binh Dinh, the population living under government control rose from 50% to 64% during the year. However, despite allied efforts, the VCC remained deeply intertwined with the population, particularly in Phu Yen and Binh Dinh. Contrary to the downward trend in total incidents, the number of assassinations and kidnappings in II Corps had risen in 1967.

=== 1968 ===
On 23 January two mechanized companies from the 1st Battalion, 50th Infantry, and South Vietnamese irregulars engaged the PAVN 2nd Regiment as it moved to a staging area several kilometers east of Phu My, killing 142 PAVN.

On the night of 29/30 January the PAVN/VC began their Tet Offensive attacks in II Corps. On the coast, two understrength battalions from the 18B Regiment and four district-based sapper companies attacked Nha Trang. At Tuy Hoa, one battalion from the 95th Regiment and one VC infantry battalion comprised the assault force, while at Qui Nhon, the attackers consisted of just one VC infantry battalion and three district-based sapper companies. In Nha Trang the attack was largely repulsed by morning and the province chief declared the city secure on 4 February, PAVN losses were 274 killed and 76 captured, while Allied losses were 74 killed. In Tuy Hoa the VC unit was ambushed during its approach, leaving the 95th Regiment to attack alone. Their attack was repulsed by ARVN forces and US artillery and then once US and ROK reinforcements arrived, the PAVN retreated to the hamlet of Binh Tin where they were eventually wiped out by napalm strikes, losing 189 killed and 31 captured. At Qui Nhon, US Navy patrol boats sank sampans carrying one sapper company, and while the two other sapper companies secured their objectives, they were wiped out in the morning as Allied reinforcements arrived. The E2B Local Force Battalion seized the Qui Nhon train station and railway yards, but were forced to retreat in the afternoon by 22nd Division and ROK Capital Division troops. 161 VC were killed and 45 captured, while ARVN losses were 35 killed.

In the Central Highlands on the night of 29–30 January the B3 Front sent a total of four infantry regiments, four sapper battalions, three local force infantry battalions, two artillery battalions, and at least nine local force companies to seize the provincial capitals of the western highlands: Kontum City, Pleiku City, and Ban Me Thuot. Two more regiments, the 66th and the 174th of the 1st Division, were to continue their siege of Ben Het and Firebase 25, and to attack the nearby town of Tan Canh in order to cut Highway 14 between Dak To and Kontum City.

At Ban Me Thuot four battalions from the PAVN 33rd Regiment, the 301st and the 401st Local Force Battalions, and four local force companies—approximately 3,000 soldiers in all—swarmed into the city from the south, securing several of their objectives, but met resistance from the 8th Armored Cavalry Squadron. The 2nd and 3rd Battalions, 45th Regiment joined the cavalry at noon, later joined by reconnaissance and Regional Forces companies. On 1 January the 23rd Ranger Battalion was flown into the city and by the 4th the PAVN had retreated. The PAVN had approximately 900 casualties, ARVN losses were 74 killed and over 560 civilians killed and 3,300 homes destroyed leaving one third of the population homeless.

At Pleiku, despite warnings of an impending attack, Corps commander Lộc had gone to Saigon for Tet, leaving Major Le Than, the deputy province chief, in charge of the defense of the city. Than placed his forces on alert and when the 408th Sapper Battalion, half of the H15 Local Force Battalion, elements of the 407th Sapper Battalion, a company from the 28th Sapper Battalion, and over a hundred local guerrillas attacked the city and Camp Holloway, they failed to capture any of their objectives. The 3rd Armored Cavalry Squadron engaged PAVN/VC throughout the city. At dawn Montagnard forces and the 11th and 22nd Ranger Battalions began clearing the city and by nightfall the PAVN/VC were hiding in the southwest corner of the city. On 31 January clearing operations continued and by nightfall most of the PAVN/VC had withdrawn. On 2 February two companies of the H15 Local Force Battalion were observed in trenches west of the city and they were then wiped out by the 3rd Armored Cavalry and US helicopter gunships. Total PAVN losses were 606 killed and 156 captured for Allied losses of 28 killed.

At Kontum, a company from the 406th PAVN Sapper Battalion and a company from the 304th Local Force Battalion approached the city from the northeast and then assaulted the airfield where they were held back by the US security forces and gunships from the 57th Assault Helicopter Company. The PAVN K6 Battalion, 24th Regiment joined the assault and was engaged by Troop A, 2d Squadron, 1st Cavalry. Simultaneously several companies from the K4 and K5 Battalions, 24th Regiment, and two companies from the 304th Battalion assaulted the 24th Special Tactical Zone compound several hundred meters to the west. Zone commander, Colonel Nguyen Trong Luat retreated to his private residence with one of his infantry companies, effectively abdicating his command duties. At dawn US helicopter gunships prowled the city and reinforcements began to arrive throughout the day. The PAVN/VC renewed their attacks on the night of 30/31 January but with limited results. A further attack on 1 February was repulsed and on the night of 2 February the PAVN/VC began withdrawing from the city having lost 753 killed. From5 to 7 February US forces engaged the PAVN 24th Regiment on Hill 684 5km northeast of the city.

On the morning of 30 January a battalion from the 174th Regiment occupied part of Tan Canh before being forced out by a battalion of the 42nd Regiment. On 8 February, the 174th Regiment returned to attack Tan Canh, but the ARVN stopped them from entering the city, killing almost 170 PAVN. Afterward, the 174th and 66th Regiments withdrew to refit in Cambodia.

On the night of 30/31 January the PAVN 2nd Regiment approached Phu My from the east, but were detected by the two mechanized companies and a mechanized troop from the 1st Squadron, 9th Cavalry, which repulsed the attack. Over the next few nights, the 2nd Regiment and the 22nd Regiment took turns attacking Phu My, but the mechanized units rebuffed them. The PAVN withdrew on 6 February, leaving behind 200 dead.

On the morning of 1 February, the PAVN 32nd Regiment, 1st Division attacked Thanh An on Highway 19. The ARVN held their ground until helicopter gunships from the 1st Squadron, 10th Cavalry, and armored personnel carriers from the 2nd Battalion, 8th Infantry (Mechanized), arrived from Camp Oasis. The next morning 275 PAVN bodies were found on the battlefield. Allied troops went after the 32nd Regiment and discovered its base camp on 5 February and they lost another 35 soldiers before they could break contact.

On 6 February the PAVN 8th Battalion, 18th Regiment attacked An Nhơn, but was repulsed by four Popular Forces platoons after losing 41 killed.

The Tet offensive most affected the Corps' pacification programs along the northeastern coast and in the western highlands. Binh Dinh province, formerly a showplace for progress through most of 1967, became more insecure than it had been at any point since the arrival of US forces in early 1966 and Phu Yen was almost as bad. Rural security was likewise almost nonexistent in the highland provinces of Kontum, Pleiku, and Darlac. The situation on the central and southern coast, on the other hand, was better. In the southwest interior, Tuyen Duc province sustained a major setback, while the offensive had largely bypassed the neighboring provinces of Quang Duc and Lam Dong.

On 23 February Thiệu replaced Lộc with Lieutenant general Lữ Mộng Lan on 23 February 1968. The demise of Lộc was a victory for both Thiệu and Westmoreland. He had ruled the Central Highlands as a personal fief since 1965 and was the last of the old, independent general-warlords who had habitually defied the central government in Saigon. To Americans, he was a "mercurial, unstable opportunist" - more of a politician than a general and more effective as a governor than a fighter.

From 1 to 30 March the US Brigade, 4th Infantry Division conducted Operation Patrick in Bình Định province.

After a night-time rocket attack on their base camp on 3 March, the 1st Squadron, 1st Cavalry Regiment and Company A, 3rd Battalion, 23rd Infantry Regiment engaged the PAVN 3rd Regiment, 3rd Division in the Battle of Tam Kỳ.

In March, Lan and I Field Force commander Peers, reorganized their forces. Peers grouped his 4th Division in the mountainous western highlands of Darlac, Pleiku, and Kontum Provinces, where it could serve as a shield for the flat farming areas on the coast. There the 173rd Airborne Brigade, two South Korean divisions, and the bulk of Lan's territorial units remained strung out along the coastal lowlands, providing security for the zone's most populated areas. Lan also split his regular forces, deploying two infantry regiments in the Highlands and another four on the coast; guarded his east-west supply routes with two cavalry squadrons; and kept his three Ranger battalions in reserve. In the ensuing months he also supervised the training of selected infantry battalions for security duty and the activation of several new regular infantry battalions, 240 territorial companies, and 1,060 territorial platoons. With the entire 4th Division and two of the better South Vietnamese regular regiments holding the PAVN at bay along the border, Peers and Lan planned to concentrate on restoring and expanding Saigon's control of the coastal population, especially in traditionally hostile Binh Dinh and Phu Yen provinces. In Binh Dinh the 173rd and the ARVN 22nd Division paired off in what was almost a replica of Operation Fairfax that had taken place in III Corps.

Peers attempted to extend the pair-off program throughout the zone. In the western highlands he instructed the US 4th Division to support the ARVN 24th Special Tactical Zone (with the three-battalion 42nd Infantry Regiment) and the 23rd Division in the Ban Me Thuot area (site of the division headquarters and its 45th Regiment). He also directed the organization of a Task Force South with the 173rd's two airborne infantry battalions, "pairing up" these units with several Ranger battalions and the remaining regiments of the 23rd Division (44th and 53rd) south of Binh Dinh. The success of the program varied greatly from unit to unit. In the interior highlands the pair-off program of the 4th Division was undeveloped as they spent most of their time in what might be termed conventional antiguerrilla, or jungle, operations: backing up CIDG border camps, and serving as a blocking force in order to keep PAVN units in Cambodia and Laos from the populated coastal regions to the east. Along the coast, the programs of the 173rd and Task Force South were more effective. In general, it appeared easier for American units to assume the traditional South Vietnamese area security missions than to have Saigon's combat units undertake the more mobile conventional operations normally pursued by the Americans. Yet even here some participating American commanders were disappointed, pointing to the stubborn reluctance of many Vietnamese officers to relinquish any authority to their subordinates. Nevertheless, Peers and Lan continued to hope that such soldier-to-soldier efforts, together with the delivery of M16 rifles and other new equipment, would give the South Vietnamese small unit leaders the confidence and ability to operate with minimum supervision. At the very least, they believed that the program greatly increased the military and police pressure on the local VC, reflecting MACV's renewed emphasis on territorial security.

From 17 March to 31 January 1969 the 1st Battalion, 503rd Infantry Regiment conducted Operation Walker to defend Camp Radcliff and to protect Highway 19 around An Khe.

From 30 March to 31 January 1969 the 173rd Airborne Brigade conducted Operation Cochise Green in Bình Định province.

From 8 April to 11 November the 198th Infantry Brigade conducted Operation Burlington Trail in Quảng Nam province.

On 5 May during their May Offensive attacks in the Corps, PAVN 325C Division assaulted Hill 990, a small CIDG outpost 2km south of Ben Het, killing one US and 66 CIDG were killed or missing for the loss of 16 PAVN killed.

Also on 5 May, a battalion from the PAVN 32nd Regiment attacked a convoy on Highway 14 to the south of Kontum City, but the ambush turned into a rout when troops from the 3rd Armored Cavalry arrived on the scene. US losses were nine killed and 16 missing, while the PAVN lost 122 killed.

On 9/10 May, a reinforced battalion from the 101D Regiment and a sapper company attacked Firebase 25, 3km northeast of Ben Het defended by US Companies C and D of the 3rd Battalion, 8th Infantry. The garrison repulsed the attack after a three-hour firefight, losing three dead and killing at least 47 PAVN.

On the evening of 25 May, the PAVN 95C and 101D Regiments assaulted Firebase 29, a 4th Infantry Division outpost 4km southwest of Ben Het that stood atop Hill 824. The attack was repulsed with PAVN losses of 198 killed, while prisoners estimated that an additional 150 of their comrades had died and around 300 were wounded. US losses were 18 killed.

On 30 May the PAVN 101st Regiment attacked Hill 990 which was now occupied by the US Company D, 3rd Battalion, 12th Infantry. The PAVN withdrew before dawn leaving 43 dead; US losses were seven killed.

Contact with the PAVN was light during the summer, with the 4th Infantry Division killing 1,500 PAVN and capturing 437 weapons and 21 tons of food between May and October.

Lan lacked the political influence of his predecessor, Lộc, which put Lan at a disadvantage when dealing with willful subordinates. That weakness was particularly evident in Binh Dinh Province. Whenever the commander of the 22nd Division, General Nguyễn Văn Hiếu, wished to organize mobile operations with his 40th Infantry Regiment or his 41st Infantry Regiment, he had to negotiate with the powerful province chief, Lt. Col. Phan Minh Tho, who used those same units to support the pacification program. The relationship between the two officers, Peers called it a “vendetta”, had been simmering for years, and to make matters worse, both of Hiếu’s regimental commanders enjoyed a close relationship with Tho. The result was a pair of regiments that rarely sought the enemy.

On 18 June, several Regional Forces companies and elements of the 3rd Battalion, 44th Infantry, engaged a company from the 482nd Local Force Battalion just north of Phan Thiet killing 62 VC for the loss of 18 ARVN. On 20 June two companies from the 482nd Battalion ambushed a patrol from the 4th Battalion, 44th Infantry, in the same area as the first encounter, killing 36 ARVN.

On the morning of 18 August, a battalion from the PAVN 101D Regiment attacked Dak Seang Camp in northwest Kon Tum Province, the attack was repulsed with 35 PAVN killed and 11 captured.

On 20 August a battalion from the PAVN 24th Regiment assaulted an ARVN firebase on Highway 14 22 km north of Pleiku. The ARVN repelled the assault killing 87 PAVN for the loss of 9 ARVN dead.

From 22 August to 12 December the 173rd Airborne Brigade and 22nd Division conducted Operation Dan Sinh 22-6 to clear the Bong Son Plain.

On the night of 23/4 August, as part of their Phase III Offensive, PAVN/VC artillery hit more than 30 locations across the Corps.

Also on the night of 23 August, the 66th Regiment and the 20th Sapper Battalion gathered near Duc Lap Camp in preparation for their attack on the base while the 320th Regiment established a blocking position on Highway 14 northeast of Duc Lap to intercept allied ground units. In the ensuing Battle of Duc Lap from 24 to 27 August the assault would be repelled for the loss of over 700 PAVN, 114 ARVN and seven US killed.

The 3rd Armored Cavalry Squadron, earned the Presidential Unit Citation (United States).

=== 1969 ===
In January 1969, Peers and Lan agreed to replace one brigade of the US 4th Division in Kontum Province with the military forces of the ARVN 24th Special Tactical Zone. Peers regarded the zone's organic infantry unit, the (nondivisional) 42nd Regiment, as well led, familiar with the land, and accustomed to using American fire support when needed. Based in a sparsely populated border area, the 42nd had developed a higher degree of combat expertise than its pacification-bound sisters along the coast, and, with II Corps armor and ranger reinforcements, its American advisers felt that the regiment could hold the northern Highlands.

In April the 173rd Airborne Brigade officially ended the unit's pair-off program and replaced it with Operation Washington Green, an intensive area security effort with territorial and paramilitary forces in Binh Dinh province. In essence, Washington Green was a second Operation Fairfax, but without the presence of ARVN regulars. Washington Green proved to be the final American campaign in Binh Dinh province. The operation appeared no more successful than Fairfax's efforts to clean up the area around Saigon prior to the Tet Offensive. Binh Dinh was not easily pacified by military action alone. American and Vietnamese local intelligence was poor, the area was a traditional enemy stronghold, and province and district officials were never able to eliminate the local VC infrastructure.

From May to June PAVN elements pushed east from the "Tri-border" area into the Ben Het-Dak To region of western Kontum Province, and, in October through November, launched similar attacks to the south in the vicinity of Duc Lap and Bu Prang, southwest of Ban Me Thuot. In general, ARVN forces along the border repelled these frontier assaults and held their advanced bases without American ground assistance. However, losses on both sides were heavy and post-battle autopsies revealed serious problems. ARVN forces survived only through the massive intervention of American fire support and logistical assistance. Neither the ARVN commanders nor their staffs were accustomed to operating under stress and around-the-clock, coordination among commands was intermittent, and staff work was poor-or, more often, nonexistent. In the 24th Special Tactical Zone, the 42nd Regiment fought well, but lost most of its leaders and received few replacements. Participating CIDG elements had also done well at times, but were neither equipped nor trained for sustained combat. In both clashes Lan and the Corps' headquarters had done little, leaving the tactical commanders to sink or swim on their own. The limitations of Vietnamese air and artillery were well known, and Corcoran was not surprised that strong US military support was necessary. Nevertheless, advisers felt that the ARVN tended to avoid maneuver, shy away from the offense, and fight from fixed positions, where they could use massive US artillery and tactical air support to destroy the attacking forces with minimum loss to themselves. Once the attackers began to withdraw, they showed little desire to pursue them.

=== 1970 ===
As the US 4th Division left Vietnam, the 22nd Division moved into Pleiku with its 47th Regiment, taking responsibility for the 24th Special Tactical Zone and the defense of the northern Highlands. Lan's Vietnamese forces now had almost complete responsibility for the western borders. His new adviser, Lieutenant general Arthur S. Collins, Jr., was troubled about the future. Upon reviewing some of the more optimistic portions of Peers' debriefing report, he questioned the existence of any discernible progress during the past two years. "Frankly," Collins observed, "I do not know what happened between 1968-1970," believing that "if the ARVN combat units had improved as much as indicated by General Peers, somewhere along the line they had again slipped back a long way." Upon his arrival in February, Collins judged that the local Vietnamese forces were "woefully weak because of lack of leadership at the regimental and battalion level," and he exhibited little of Peers' optimism. Collins' deputy senior adviser, agreed, citing one battalion of the 53rd Regiment (23rd Division), which he "sat in Dalat during all of 1969 and killed only ten enemy while suffering just two of its members killed," a record that "can hardly justify the cost of its existence."

Later in the year Collins assessed that the dissolution of the 24th Special Tactical Zone headquarters and the transfer of its responsibilities to the 22nd Division had not brought any noticeable improvement to the Highlands. Local American and South Vietnamese cross-border incursions there had amounted to only minor raids. The 42nd Infantry Regiment had continued its decline begun during the Ben Het Camp battles of 1969, and neither the 42nd nor the 22nd's 47th Regiment had done well during the struggle for the Dak Seang Camp in April. Collins regarded the other five regiments in the zone as acceptable, but saw their "lack of aggressiveness" as a "persistent" and "fatal weakness."" In his opinion, ARVN units were "no match" for their PAVN opponents, and ARVN commanders relied too heavily on American air and artillery support now that it was available in quantity. In combat, they were simply unwilling to close with enemy forces. "The failure is one of leadership... and one of will."

In August Thiệu replaced Lan as Corps commander with General Ngô Du.

The government resumed the practice of forcibly relocating Montagnard tribes from their traditional homelands, generating some 52,000 Montagnard "relocatees," or refugees, in 1970-71. Du felt that the action was necessary because of his inability to provide security for the scattered Highlander villages and his conviction that many were aiding the PAVN/VC. Under pressure from MACV and the US Embassy, the government subsequently ordered the practice abandoned, declaring that the tribes should remain in their home areas and pointing out to II Corps officials that the North Vietnamese had never been successful in enlisting Montagnard support for their cause.

=== 1971 ===
On 30 April I Field Force and II Corps Advisory Group were merged to form the Second Regional Assistance Group, led by John Paul Vann.

=== 1972 ===
The 21st Tank Regiment was formed at Pleiku in 1972.

ARVN II Corps in 1971

The PAVN objective during the Easter Offensive in II Corps was to seize the cities of Kon Tum and Pleiku, thereby overrunning the Highlands. This would then open the possibility of proceeding east to the coastal plains, splitting South Vietnam in two. The PAVN were under the command of Lieutenant general Hoang Minh Thao, commander of the B-3 Front. The Front included the 320th and 2nd Divisions in the highlands and the 3rd Division in the lowlands – approximately 50,000 men.It had become evident as early as January that the PAVN were building up for offensive operations in the tri-border region and numerous B-52 strikes had been conducted in the area in hopes of slowing the build-up. ARVN forces had also been deployed forward toward the border in order to slow the PAVN advance and allow the application of airpower to deplete North Vietnamese manpower and logistics.

The Highlands offensive was preceded by PAVN/VC diversionary operations that opened on 5 April in coastal Bình Định province, which aimed at closing Highway 1, seizing several ARVN firebases, and diverting South Vietnamese forces from operations further west. The 22nd Division was split between the Highlands and the coast, where it still had area security missions, and was more or less chopped up in detail. The division headquarters was overrun at Tan Canh. Du blamed himself for the initial defeats, lost heart, and was replaced by General Nguyễn Văn Toàn, but CORDS' commander Vann effectively took over the defense of II Corps. Kontum city, key to the Highlands, was defended by a mixed bag of Airborne, Ranger, territorial, and armored forces, and one regiment of the 23rd Division. Colonel Lý Tòng Bá, the new commander of the 23rd Division was put in charge of the defense, but he found it impossible to control the non-divisional elements supposedly under his command, and Vann himself reported on 2 May that the Airborne and Ranger commanders at Kontum were "in almost open rebellion" and later, on the 8th, noted the start of several Montagnard mutinies. However, the PAVN took their time investing the city, giving the defenders a chance to reorganize. At Vann's suggestion, Toàn replaced the Airborne and Ranger units with the other two regiments of the 23rd, and with his entire division on line, Ba was able to hold out against repeated PAVN attacks supported by US B-52 strikes, tactical air, and helicopter gunships coordinated by Vann and his team. By early June the PAVN were withdrawing back into their border sanctuaries.

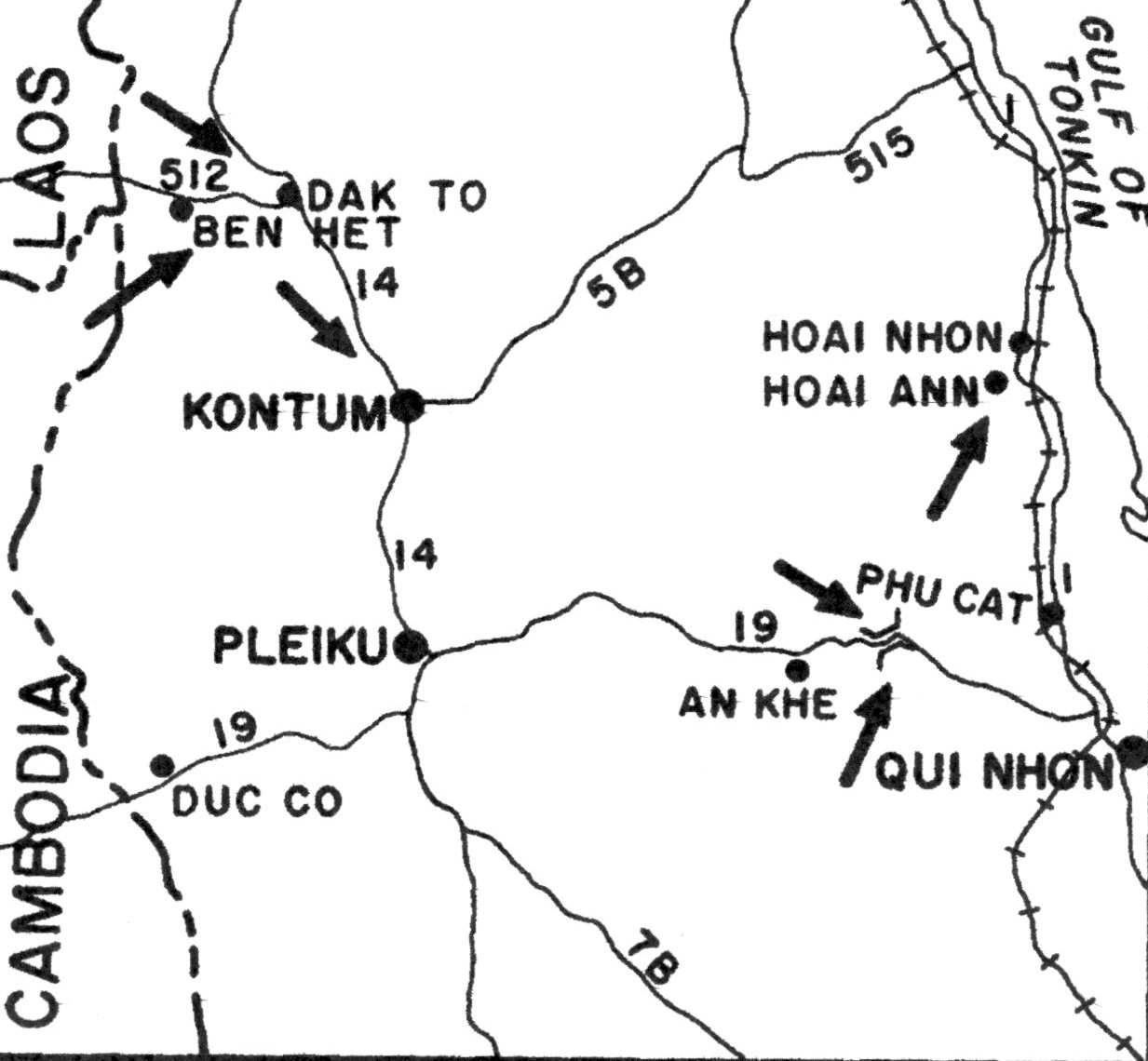
PAVN Offensive in ARVN II Corps

Vann was killed on the night of 9/10 June when his OH-58 helicopter was shot down. He was replaced by Brigadier general Michael D. Healy and the group was redesignated the Second Regional Assistance Command.

=== 1973 ===
From 23 January in anticipation of the Paris Peace Accords ceasefire, PAVN/VC and South Vietnamese forces attempted to maximize the territory under their control in the War of the flags before the ceasefire came into effect.

From 8 June to 16 September in the Battle of Trung Nghia PAVN forces captured the village of Trung Nghia in the Central Highlands west of Kontum. The PAVN were eventually forced out.

From 21 September Plei Djereng Camp came under PAVN artillery fire and on the 22nd it was overrun by the 26th Regiment, 320th Division supported by artillery and tanks. 200 of the 293 Rangers at the camp were killed or captured during the battle.

From 30 October to 10 December in the Battle of Quang Duc PAVN forces attempted to occupy part of Quang Duc province to expand their logistical network from Cambodia into South Vietnam.

=== 1974 ===
On 4 May a PAVN battalion overran Nui Ya and then attacked Ky Tra, a sprawling village on a minor road junction in the hills west of Chu Lai. On 5 May the PAVN 1st Infantry Regiment, 2nd Division, occupied Ky Tra. At the same time the PAVN 31st Regiment, 2nd Division, launched an attack on outposts protecting Tien Phuoc, but two RF battalions at Tien Phuoc repelled the 31st Regiment attacks with heavy losses. The fighting for control of Ky Tra and Tien Phuoc continued until June with three ARVN battalions rendered combat ineffective.

On 27 May the PAVN bombarded Tieu Atar Camp, north of Ban Me Thuot, which was garrisoned by the 211th RF Battalion, with 60 rounds of 82mm mortar fire. On 30 May more than 1,000 mortar rounds hit the camp followed by an assault by one or two PAVN battalions which overran the camp.

On 14 June the PAVN 29th Regiment, 324B Division attacked Dak Pek Camp, overrunning the base on 16 June.

On 25 July the PAVN began besieging Mang Buk, 50km north of Kontum, which was garrisoned by two RF companies and two PF platoons. 3,000 rounds of rocket and mortar fire hit the camp between 2S July and 4 August. On 18 August after a respite, the camp again came under heavy fire. On 19 August two battalions of the 66th Regiment, 10th Division, supported by artillery overran the camp and the surviving defenders withdrew towards Chuong Nghia.

On 4 August the PAVN began besieging Plei Me Camp, garrisoned by the 82nd Ranger Battalion and the 2nd Company, 81st Ranger Battalion. The main defense was inside Plei Me Camp itself, with outposts in Chu Ho Hill and Hill 509. The PAVN 320th Division employed at least four infantry battalions from its 9th and 48th Regiments, plus the 26th Independent Regiment of the B-3 Front, and later a battalion of its 64th Regiment. Artillery support included at least two 130mm guns and at least 12 heavy antiaircraft machine guns were in position to fire into the camp and at RVNAF aircraft. On 10 August Chu Ho fell, followed by Hill 509 on 15 August, but the main camp held on. On 2 September the PAVN withdrew after having launched 20 ground assaults, fired over 10,000 artillery and mortar rounds and lost at least 350 soldiers.

On 30 September the PAVN began attacking a series of outposts around Chuong Nghia, the last major ARVN base in Kontum province. By 2 October, five outposts had fallen and the main camp, defended by the 254th RF Battalion, was under heavy bombardment. On 3 October, after an intense artillery bombardment, the PAVN 28th Regiment overran the camp.

On 30 October Thieu replaced Toan as Corps' commander with Major general Phạm Văn Phú.

=== 1975 ===
On 9 January a PAVN sapper attack at Pleiku destroyed 1.5m gallons of assorted fuel.

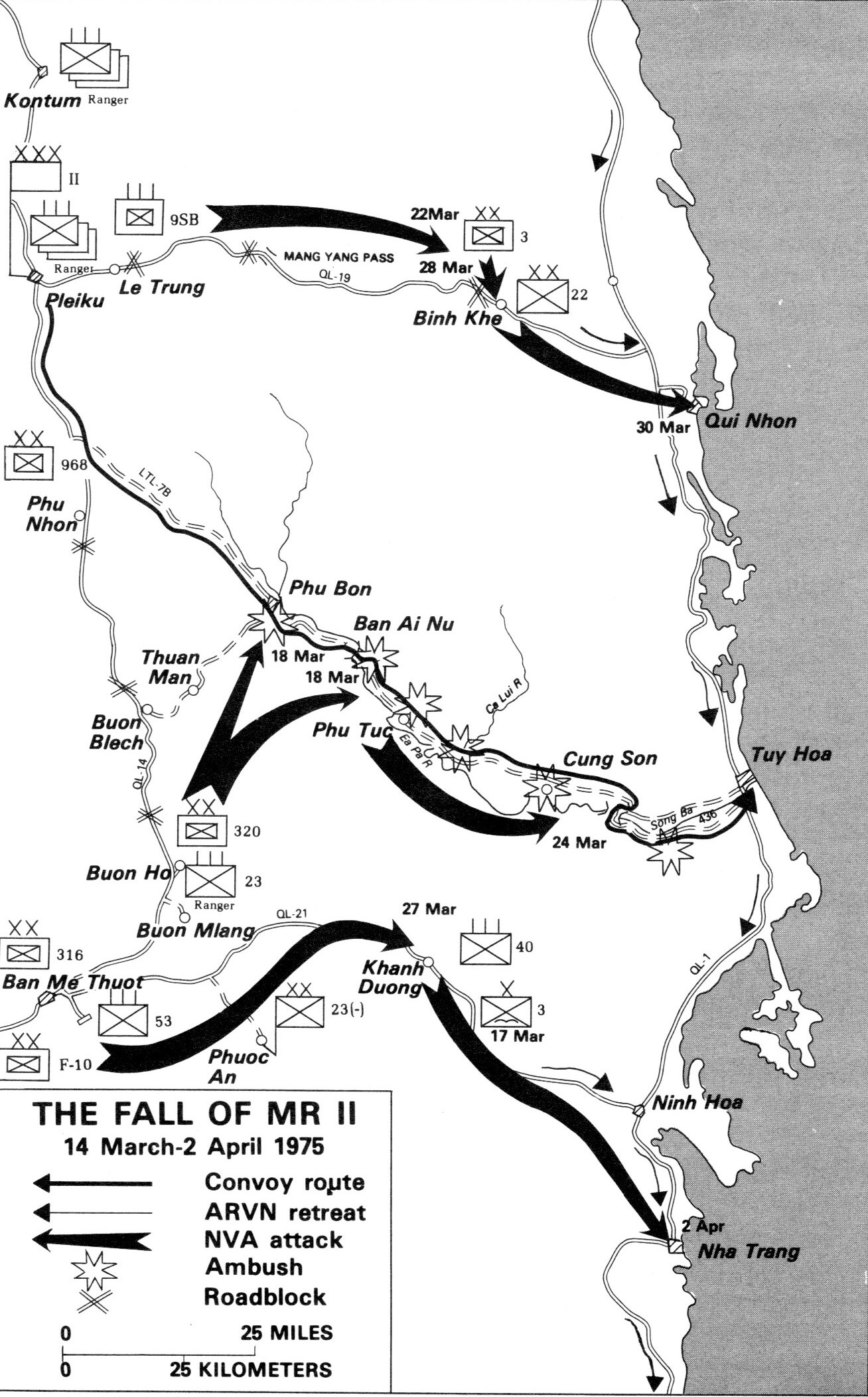
Collapse of MRII, March-April 1975

On 10 January the PAVN overran outposts of the 223rd RF Battalion on Route 19 east of Le Trung. The 45th Regiment counterattacked and within a few days recaptured the original positions.

On 30 January airstrikes damaged three PAVN tanks in a base area north of Ban Me Thuot, and the 53rd Regiment launched an operation into the area, meeting light resistance.

On 4 February a PAVN rallier from the 48th Regiment, 320th Division confirmed that the 320th was moving to Darlac.

On 28 February an ARVN unit ambushed a PAVN reconnaissance patrol 12km north of Ban Me Thuot, and the Corps' G-2, as well as the G2 of the JGS, insisted that a major attack on Ban Me Thuot was imminent. On the same day the PAVN attacked Kontum with artillery.

Believing that the main PAVN attack would be in Kontum and Pleiku, and that the fighting at Ban Me Thuot was a deception, Phu recalled the 45th Regiment from Darlac to Pleiku. He also directed the 23rd Division to pull its forward command post out of Ban Me Thuot and return it to Pleiku. Further on 4 March he ordered General Niem to alert his 42nd Infantry Regiment for movement to Pleiku.

On 3 March the PAVN began their 1975 spring offensive by attacking Ban Me Thuot. Ban Me Thuot was captured on the 12th. On 14 March Thieu ordered Phu to abandon Kontum and Pleiku, withdrawing the forces there, regroup them in Khanh Hoa province and then attack up Route 21 to retake Ban Me Thuot. The withdrawal of ARVN forces from Pleiku along the decrepit Route 7B began on 16 March and was soon joined by large numbers of civilians fleeing the PAVN who soon became entangled in combat formations, impeding their movement and ability to deploy and fight. The PAVN moved to intercept the withdrawal and by 18 March was attacking the column. The vanguard of the "convoy of tears" eventually reached Tuy Hòa on 25 March. Only an estimated 20,000 of the 60,000 troops reached Tuy Hòa and they were no longer fit for combat.

From 10 March the PAVN began attacking 22nd Divisions along Route 19 and by 22 March the PAVN had captured An Khe.

On 21 March the remnants of the 23rd Division were flown to Cam Ranh. The 3rd Airborne Brigade was taken off its ships in Nha Trang and rushed to Khanh Duong on Route 21 to halt the pursuing PAVN 10th Division.

After defending Binh Khe since 24 March, on 27 March the 41st and 42nd Regiments broke through the PAVN and retreated to Qui Nhon. As they prepared to defend the city the 22nd Division was ordered to prepare for evacuation.

On 29 March Phú issued new command responsibilities for what was left of the Corps, however the momentum of the PAVN advance was such that a defense at Cam Ranh was no longer feasible.

From 30 to 31 March the PAVN 10th Division attacked the 3rd Airborne Brigade positions along Route 21, forcing their withdrawal to Nha Trang and isolating remnants of the 2nd, 5th and 6th Airborne Battalions in the M'Đrăk Pass.

On 31 March the PAVN 320th Division had Tuy Hòa under artillery fire. As the PAVN attacked Phu Cat Air Base the RVNAF flew out about 32 aircraft, leaving about 58, mostly disabled or destroyed, on the ground.

From 1-2 April, about 7,000 troops of the 22nd Division and Binh Dinh territorials boarded Navy ships at Qui Nhon and sailed for Vũng Tàu.

On the morning of 2 April Phú met with General Nguyễn Văn Hiếu, the deputy commander of III Corps near Phan Thiết, Hiếu informed Phú that II Corps had been dissolved and the remaining provinces and forces would be incorporated into III Corps.

== Divisions ==
22nd Infantry Division

23rd Infantry Division
