= Operation Hawthorne =

Part of the Vietnam War (1966)

- Part of the Vietnam War
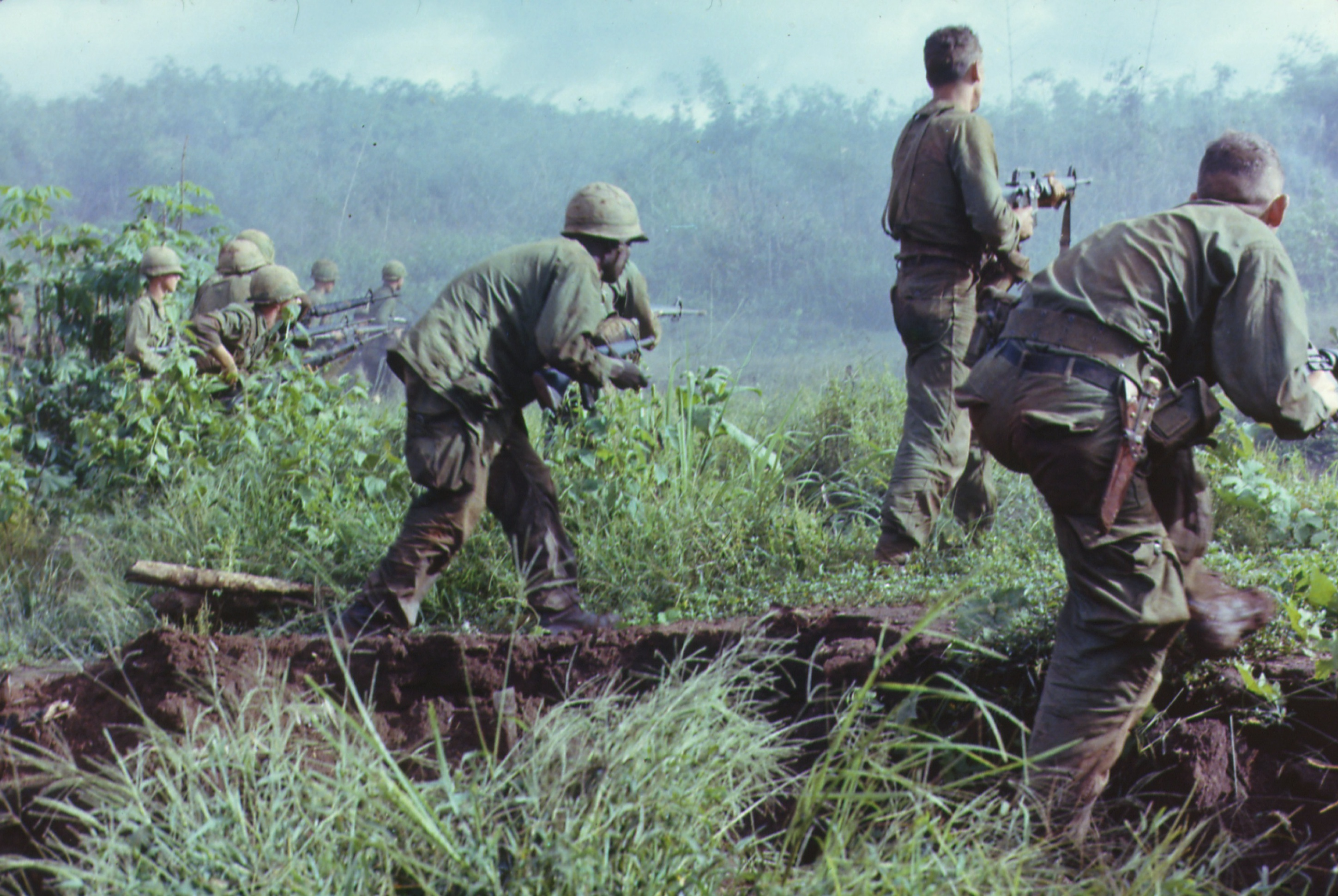
- An infantry patrol moves up to assault the last Viet Cong position at Đắk Tô, 7 June 1966.
| Date | 2–21 June 1966 |
| Location | Toumorong, South Vietnam 14.814°N 107.906°E |
| Result | U.S. & South Vietnamese victory |

Belligerents
| United States; South Vietnam | North Vietnam |

Commanders and leaders
| (United States) BG Willard Pearson | Unknown |

Units involved
| (United States) 101st Airborne Division: 1st Battalion, 327th Infantry Regiment; 2nd Battalion, 502nd Infantry Regiment; 1st Battalion, 5th Cavalry Regiment; (South Vietnam) 42nd Regiment; 21st Ranger Battalion | 24th Regiment |

Casualties and losses
| (United States) 48 killed (South Vietnam) 10 killed | 688 killed 506 estimated killed 21 captured |

Operation Hawthorne took place near the village of Tu Mơ Rông, Kon Tum Province, South Vietnam from 2 to 21 June 1966.

== Background ==
The Central Highlands, in II Corps, masked crucial supply routes carrying munitions and support to People's Army of Vietnam (PAVN) and Viet Cong (VC) operations further south and COMUSMACV General William Westmoreland, aimed to contest any incursions into the area. In the province of Kontum PAVN/VC used the monsoon rains as an opportunity to mount a major offensive.

The operation was mounted to relieve elements of the Army of the Republic of Vietnam (ARVN) 42nd Regiment, 22nd Division under siege at Toumorong (14.886°N 107.96°E) northeast of Đắk Tô. To relieve the regiment and to fight off the estimated regiment-sized enemy force present, three battalions of the 1st Brigade, 101st Airborne Division, a battalion of the 1st Cavalry Division (Airmobile) and two Civilian Irregular Defense Group companies were concentrated, under the overall command of Brigadier General Willard Pearson, commander, 1st Brigade, 101st Airborne Division, himself responsible to I Field Force.

== Operation ==
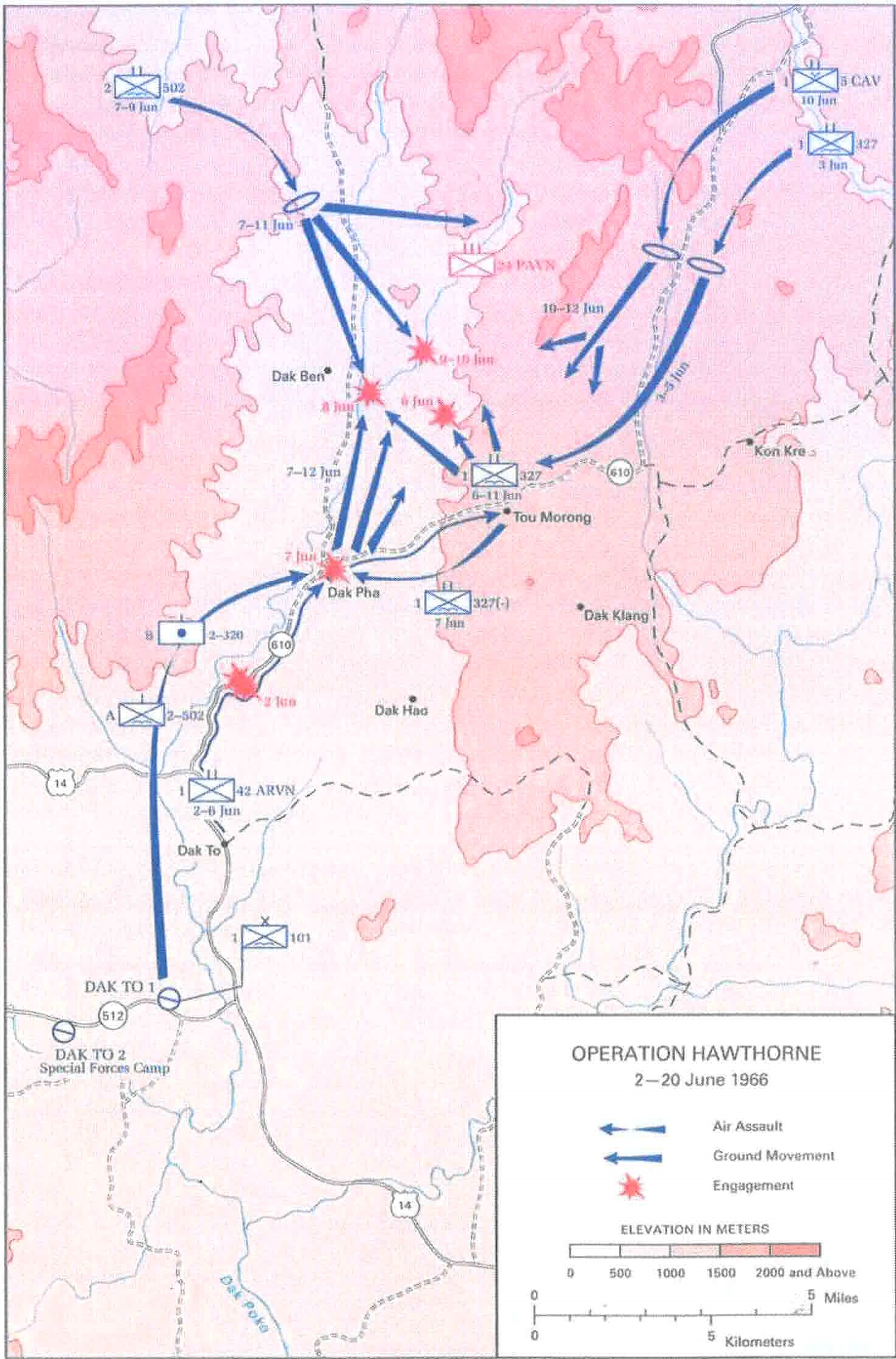
Operation Hawthorne, 2-20 June 1966

On 3 June elements of the ARVN 42nd Regiment moved north by road from Đắk Tô to Toumorong, while the 1st Battalion, 327th Infantry Regiment was deployed by helicopter to blocking positions north and east of Toumorong. On 6 June the garrison at Toumorong was relieved and withdrawn while the 1/327th and Company A 2nd Battalion, 502nd Infantry Regiment and Battery B 2nd Battalion, 320th Artillery Regiment remained at Toumorong and in the surrounding area.

At 02:15 on 7 June an estimated PAVN battalion attacked the 2/502nd and 2/320th position, the initial assault was beaten back, but the PAVN made two further assaults and the fighting continued until 09:00 when the PAVN were forced back by air and artillery support. At 07:00 on 7 June the remainder of the 2/502nd was committed to the battle and dropped into a landing zone northwest of the battle area. At 13:00 Company A engaged a PAVN unit which developed into a pitched battle lasting until nightfall. PAVN losses for the day were 77 killed.

On 8 June the 1/327th pursued withdrawing PAVN forces northwest killing 31 PAVN. US losses were 5 killed and 17 wounded.

On the afternoon of 9 June Company C, 2/502nd engaged an estimated PAVN Battalion northwest of Toumorong (14.814°N 107.906°E), B Company was moving to assist C Company when it too was engaged by another PAVN Battalion (14.836°N 107.92°E). Company C 2/502nd was trapped in a bowl surrounded by PAVN on 3 sides in close contact and threatening to overrun their position. As air support arrived overhead the C Company commander Captain Bill Carpenter radioed the orbiting forward air controller "Lay it right on top of us...they are overrunning us, we might as well take some of them too." The two orbiting F-4Cs dropped napalm which hit inside and outside the Company perimeter breaking up the PAVN attack. Further airstrikes were then called in outside the Company perimeter. Company A 2/502nd and Company A 1/327th were sent to relieve Company C 2/502nd, Company A 1/327th engaged a PAVN company at 21:50, the 1st Battalion, 5th Cavalry Regiment linked up with Company B at 22:15 and formed a new defensive position while Company A 2/502nd eventually linked up with Company C at 23:30.

On 10 June Companies A and C 2/502nd and Company B 2/502nd and 1/5 Cavalry defended their respective positions while Company C 1/327th was sent to assist Company A 1/327th as it engaged an estimated PAVN platoon (14.806°N 107.90°E). Later that day 15 B-52s dropped 270 tons of bombs on suspected PAVN positions.

On 11 June the US units attempted to withdraw from contact with the PAVN as the PAVN "hugging" tactics reduced the effectiveness of US air and artillery support. As Company A 1/327th withdrew it ran into an entrenched PAVN Battalion and was only able to disengage with the help of close air support and artillery fire. On the afternoon of the 11th Companies A and C 2/502nd were extracted back to Đắk Tô.

At 08:00 on 13 June 24 B-52s dropped 432 tons of bombs on the 9–10 June battle area, US troops were quickly lifted by helicopter into the bombed area and reported that the strike had been very effective and captured several dazed PAVN soldiers. Following the B-52 strike minimal contact was made with the PAVN until the operation terminated on 21 June.

== Aftermath ==
U.S. losses were 48 killed and 239 wounded, ARVN losses were 10 killed and 29 wounded, US/ARVN claiming PAVN losses were 479 killed (body count), 209 killed by aircraft of which 52 were counted, plus an estimated further 506 killed, 21 PAVN/VC were captured.
