= Operation Fillmore =

Part of the Vietnam War (1966)

- Part of the Vietnam War
Date	26 March – 21 July 1966
Location	Phú Yên Province, South Vietnam
Result	Inconclusive

Belligerents
United States	North Vietnam

Commanders and leaders
BG Willard Pearson	

Units involved
1st Brigade, 101st Airborne Division	

Casualties and losses
8 killed	134 killed 35 captured

Operation Fillmore was an operation conducted by the 1st Brigade, 101st Airborne Division in Phú Yên Province, lasting from 26 March to 21 July 1966.

== Prelude ==
Operation Fillmore was a continuation of the harvest security operations of Operation Harrison.

== Operation ==
The 1st Battalion, 327th Infantry Regiment was retained as a reserve force at Tuy Hoa Air Base, while the 2/327th Infantry and the 2nd Battalion, 502nd Infantry Regiment patrolled the rice-growing plains and the western foothills.

In early April, 2/502nd Infantry was rotated to Tuy Hoa Air Base and 1/327th and 2/327th began a block and sweep operation in the mountains northwest of Tuy Hòa. On 7 April a company from 1/327th engaged an entrenched company-sized force, killing 28 defenders.

Given that the PAVN had apparently withdrawn from the Tuy Hòa Valley, on 9 April 1/327th and 2/502nd were redeployed, leaving only the 2/327th Infantry to continue operations.

== Aftermath ==
Operation Fillmore officially concluded on 21 July, the US claimed PAVN losses were 134 killed and 35 captured, U.S. losses were 8 killed.
