= Operation Seward =

Part of the Vietnam War (1966)

- Part of the Vietnam War
Date	5–25 September 1966
Location	Phú Yên Province, South Vietnam 13.1°N 109.182°E
Result	U.S. operational success

Belligerents
United States	North Vietnam; Viet Cong

Commanders and leaders
BG Willard Pearson	

Units involved
1st Brigade, 101st Airborne Division	(Vietnam) 18B Regiment (Vietnam) 95th Regiment; 307th Battalion

Casualties and losses
27 killed	239 killed

Operation Seward was an operation conducted by the 1st Brigade, 101st Airborne Division in Phú Yên Province, lasting from 5 to 25 September 1966.

== Prelude ==
Operation Seward was a harvest security operation in Phú Yên Province that continued with the same units in the same general area as the just concluded Operation John Paul Jones.

== Operation ==
The operation commenced on 5 September and for the first 11 days saw only small skirmishes. On 8 September a unit from the 1st Battalion, 327th Infantry Regiment engaged a 7-man patrol from the People's Army of Vietnam (PAVN) 18B Regiment, killing 4 and capturing 3. The prisoners revealed that their unit was planning to attack the hamlet of Tu Bong and so the 2nd Battalion, 502nd Infantry Regiment was deployed there to forestall any attack.

At 02:00 on 17 September, under cover of heavy rain more than 100 Viet Cong (VC) attacked the night defensive position of Company B 2/327th, targeting the command post with satchel charges. The attack killed 10 soldiers including the Company commander, the executive officer and the forward observer. The Company had occupied the same position for several days and despite VC probes the Company commander had failed to move his command post, this carelessness prompted BG Willard Pearson to order that in future field command posts should be relocated every 48 hours.

== Aftermath ==
Operation Seward officially concluded on 25 September, Viet Cong losses were 239 killed by body count from the 18B Regiment, 95th Regiment and 307th Battalion, U.S. losses were 27 killed. BG Pearson regarded the operation as a success because 90 percent of the rice crop had been harvested with minimal interference.
