= Operation Garfield =

1966 Vietnam War operation

- Part of the Vietnam War
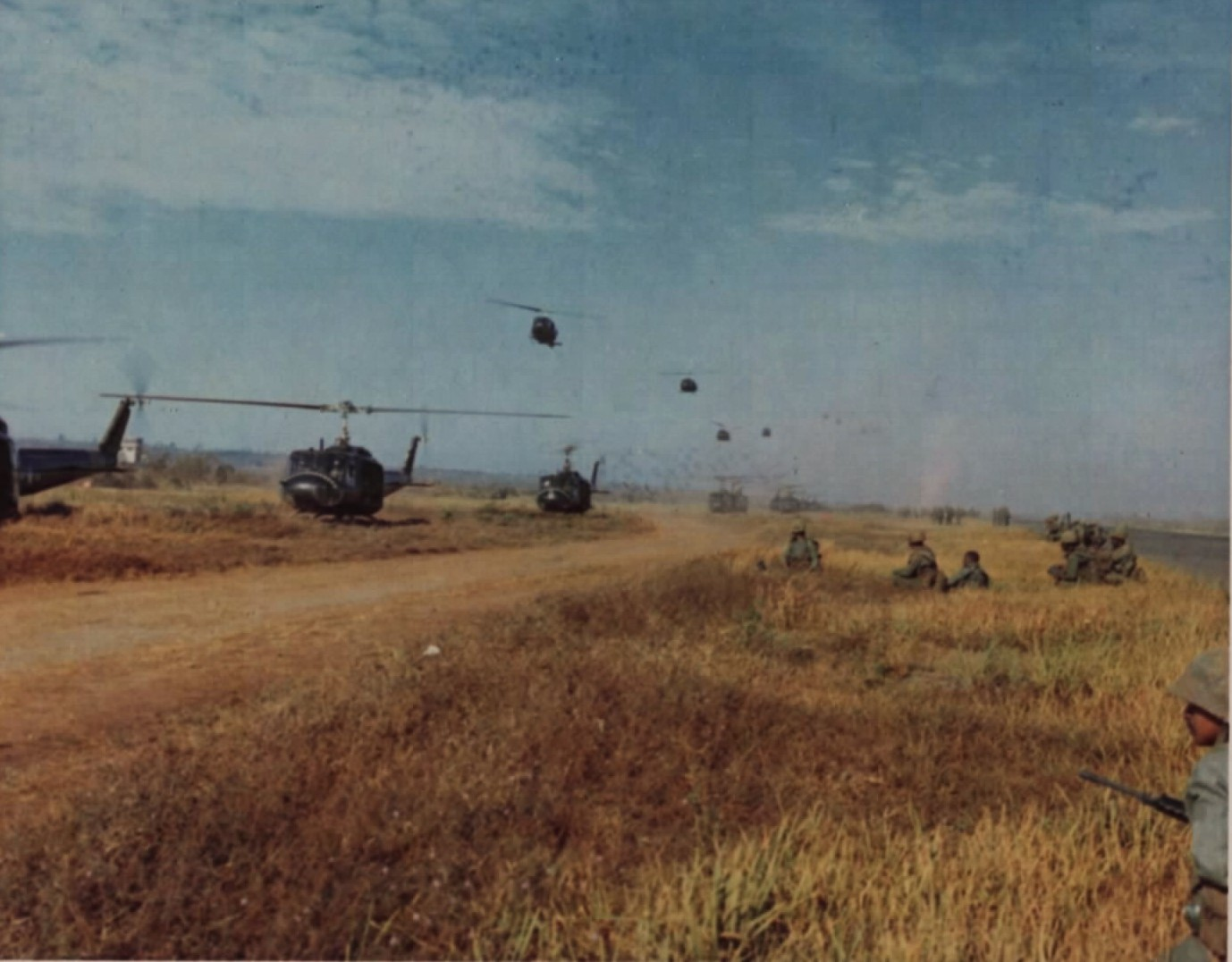
- UH-1Ds lift 3rd Brigade, 25th Infantry Division troops from Ban Me Thuot
Date	25 February - 25 March 1966
Location	Darlac province, South Vietnam 12.666667°N 108.05°E
Result	U.S. victory

Belligerents
United States	North Vietnam

Commanders and leaders
General Stanley R. Larsen; Colonel Everette A. Stoutner	unknown

Units involved
3rd Brigade, 25th Infantry Division	32nd Regiment

Casualties and losses
21 killed	122 killed

Operation Garfield was an operation during the Vietnam War, by the 3rd Brigade, 25th Infantry Division in Darlac province from 25 February to 25 March 1966.

== Prelude ==
Darlac province, south of Pleiku was some 200m above sea level, much of the area consisted of rolling terrain, but rugged mountains up to 2,500m in height and heavy jungle characterized its southern and southeastern portions. Since the dry season was under way, low humidity, warm temperatures, and prevailing winds from the east and northeast provided good campaigning weather. The 3rd Brigade was to search for People's Army of Vietnam (PAVN) forces north and west of the province capital, Ban Me Thuot, in a large area bounded on the east by Highway 14, on the west by the Cambodian border, on the south by Ban Me Thuot, and on the north by the Darlac/Pleiku province boundary.

Although the brigade's intelligence officer suggested that a PAVN battalion might be located about 30km north of Ban Me Thuot, intelligence on enemy activities in the region was sketchy at best. Whether or not the operation achieved its primary goal of flushing the enemy out of a long-standing safe haven, the hope was that it would generate the sort of intelligence that would lead to productive missions in the future.

== Operation ==
The commenced on 25 February, when C-130s began a two-day round-the-clock airlift of the brigade from Pleiku to Ban Me Thuot East Airfield, where Brigade commander Colonel Everette A. Stoutner established his command post. The Army of the Republic of Vietnam 34th Battalion, 44th Regiment, 23rd Infantry Division, provided security for the brigade headquarters, freeing Stoutner's maneuver elements for the hunt. From 28 February to 7 March his troops conducted numerous air assaults and saturation patrols, increasingly directing their attention to the area around the Mewal Plantation, a suspected infiltration way station about 20km north of Ban Me Thuot. Although sporadic firefights occurred, the largest force that Stoutner's men encountered was a squad.

On 4 March Task Force Alpha commander General Stanley R. Larsen ordered Stoutner to shift his base of operations to Buon Brieng airfield, the site of a closed Special Forces camp 55km north of Ban Me Thuot and just west of Highway 14. After completing the move, Stoutner initiated a series of patrols between the 8th and 15th, mainly looking west of Buon Brieng along the boundary between Darlac and Pleiku provinces. He was able to cover a great deal of ground this time because Larsen had made a number of CH-47 Chinooks available to him to move his troops and artillery. Even so, one day was much like any other - air assaults into sterile landing zones, foot patrols into surrounding terrain, and no combat. The monotony was deceiving, however, because the enemy could appear unexpectedly. At 03:20 on the 11th a company in a night laager received a pounding from 40-60 mortar rounds that wounded 11 men.

On 15 March the brigade had its first taste of major combat. The previous evening the 1st Battalion, 35th Infantry had settled in at a landing zone about 13km northwest of Buon Brieng. During the night an enemy force fired 40-50 mortar rounds at the perimeter, but the rounds fell short. The following morning Company A searched in the direction from which the barrage had come. The 3rd Platoon left on that mission at 06:30, following the Ea Wy stream. Coming upon the mortar site, the troops found a number of unfired rounds, a booklet with firing tables, and a history of the enemy unit's operations over the previous year. They spent the next three hours moving northwest along the stream. Around noon the platoon leader decided to return to base, but shortly afterward his point man discovered a wire and started to follow it to its source. When he did, PAVN troops who had been watching all along brought the platoon under fire. Although outnumbered, the Americans held their own against possibly two reinforced companies from a unit later identified as the 32nd Regiment. Within 15 minutes a forward air controller brought in the first of what would become 16 tactical air sorties over the afternoon. At 13:15 the commander of Company A air-assaulted in with another platoon. The PAVN chose that moment to launch an attack and inflicted casualties on the arriving troops. However shells from the nearby 2nd Battalion, 9th Artillery, rained down upon them in between helicopter flights. A half hour after the arrival of the company commander, a third platoon landed. The company counterattacked, overrunning the strongpoint and pursuing the PAVN as they fled to the west and south. Meanwhile, artillery and close-air support pounded likely avenues of escape along the Ea Wy, and Company B was sent about 1km west to serve as a blocking force. The Americans then conducted a three-hour search, which resulted in 21 PAVN killed. During the evening the two companies linked up near where the action had started and folded in behind a common perimeter to spend the night. US losses were 11 killed and 27 wounded. PAVN losses were 36 killed and possibly another 100 killed and 12 rifles and an M79 grenade launcher captured.

On 18 March the 1st Battalion, 14th Infantry deployed some 30km northwest of Buon Brieng. After searching all day long, the battalion simulated a departure by helicopter, but only the command group and the artillery actually withdrew. During the night the three rifle companies that stayed behind moved out along different preselected routes, hoping that the PAVN would think they had the area to themselves and would let down their guard. When nothing occurred the first night, the troops took cover during daylight and returned to the field when darkness fell. Once again nothing happened, but at 07:45 on the 20th Company C fought a PAVN force for about 45 minutes, killing 19 at a cost of one wounded. Over the next five days Stoutner's battalions continued their efforts. In a series of small firefights they accounted for 15 more PAVN killed, losing one of their own.

== Aftermath ==
Stoutner terminated the operation on 25 March. During the month-long operation the 3rd Brigade, supported by airstrikes and artillery, had counted 122 PAVN dead at a cost of 21 Americans killed. Stoutner believed that he had also kept the PAVN off balance, making it more difficult for them to prepare for operations during the coming rainy season.
