= Operation Nathan Hale =

Part of the Vietnam War (1966)

- Part of the Vietnam War
Date	19–30 June 1966
Location	Phú Yên Province, South Vietnam 13.166°N 109.166°E

Belligerents
United States	North Vietnam

Commanders and leaders
MGen Stanley R. Larsen; Col Hal Moore; MGen John Norton	

Units involved
1st Cavalry Division: 1st Brigade; 3rd Brigade; 101st Airborne Division: 2nd Battalion, 327th Infantry Regiment	18B Regiment

Casualties and losses
~32 killed	450 killed further 300 estimated killed

Operation Nathan Hale was an operation conducted by the 1st Cavalry Division west of Phú Yên Province, lasting from 19 to 30 June 1966.

== Prelude ==
In mid-June, U.S. intelligence indicated that a large People's Army of Vietnam (PAVN) force had arrived in the Trung Luong Valley west of Tuy An District, this was later identified to be the 18B Regiment which had recently arrived to join the Viet Cong 5th Division. On 18 June an enemy force attacked a CIDG Company operating out of Dong Tre Special Force Camp and it was believed that the PAVN/VC might be preparing to attack the camp.

== Operation ==
On 19 June Companies A and C 2nd Battalion, 327th Infantry Regiment were landed by helicopter in the Trung Luong Valley and proceeded to sweep the area with artillery support provided by the 2nd Battalion, 320th Artillery. The Companies engaged in small skirmishes with PAVN/VC forces before establishing two night defensive positions.

On 20 June the two Companies resumed their sweep. As Company A approached the hamlet of Trung Luong 2 in the center of the valley they were hit by automatic weapon and mortar fire that wounded all of the officers except the commander. The PAVN then charged Company A and after intense close combat the Company withdrew to its previous night defensive position. Meanwhile, Company C was engaged by a PAVN force on Hill 258 and withdrew to a defensive position. Later that afternoon Company B 2/327th was landed in a hot landing zone northwest of Hill 258 losing 2 men killed, Company B tried to relieve Company C but was soon pinned down by PAVN fire. The Battalion had lost 14 killed that day and only artillery support prevented the 3 separate Companies from being overrun.

MGen Stanley R. Larsen ordered Col Hal Moore, commander of the 3rd Brigade, 1st Cavalry Division to take control of the operation which was now named Nathan Hale. The Field Force Reserve unit, the 1st Battalion, 8th Cavalry Regiment was flown from Kon Tum to Dong Tre Camp and then into the valley, arriving in position 600m north of Hill 258 by 22:00. An additional artillery battery from 5th Battalion, 27th Artillery Regiment set up a new firebase 2km south of the 2/320th Artillery firebase.

On the morning of 21 June, Company B 2/327th supported by Companies B and C 1/8 Cavalry assaulted Hill 258 but found that the PAVN had abandoned the position overnight. Companies A and C 2/327th attacked Truong Luong 2 from the west and east, but made slow progress and withdrew having lost 6 killed while killing 35 PAVN. That evening Companies B and C 1/8 Cavalry moved to Truong Luong 2, Company B 1/8th joined with Company C 2/327th at a position called Eagle west of Truong Luong 2, while Company C 1/8th joined Company A 2/237th on the east. That night 2nd Battalion, 7th Cavalry Regiment was moved to Tuy Hòa Base Camp to serve as a reserve force.

At 05:40 on 22 June the PAVN hit position Eagle with mortars and machine gun fire and then launched a Company-sized assault on the west perimeter defended by heavy weapons platoon of Company C 2/327th. The PAVN force penetrated the perimeter and was mingled with the U.S. defenders meaning that artillery fire and air support could not be used, the fight continued for over 3 hours before the PAVN withdrew around 09:00. 96 PAVN bodies were found on the west perimeter and a prisoner revealed that his unit, the 2nd Company, 7th Battalion had been annihilated. Another 19 dead PAVN were found around the perimeter. U.S. losses were 12 dead.

On 26 June the 1st Brigade, 1st Cavalry Division joined the operation and MGen John Norton assumed overall command. The four Battalions continued to sweep the valley making sporadic contact with the PAVN.

== Aftermath ==
Operation Nathan Hale officially concluded on 30 June, PAVN losses were 450 killed and a further 300 estimated killed. The operation was regarded as a success in that any PAVN attack on Dong Tre was prevented and the 2nd Company, 7th Battalion, 18B Regiment had been destroyed while the rest of the Battalion was believed to have suffered 50 percent casualties rendering it combat ineffective.
