= Operation Geronimo (Vietnam War) =

Part of the Vietnam War (1966)

Operation Gerinomo
- Part of the Vietnam War
Date	31 October – 4 December 1966
Location	Phú Yên Province, South Vietnam

Belligerents
United States; South Korea; South Vietnam	North Vietnam

Commanders and leaders
(United States) BG Willard Pearson	

Units involved
(United States) 4th Infantry Division: 1st Brigade; (United States) 101st Airborne Division: 1st Brigade; (South Korea) 9th Infantry Division: 28th Infantry Regiment; (South Vietnam) 22nd Infantry Division: 47th Infantry Regiment	18B Regiment; 95th Regiment

Casualties and losses
(United States) 16 killed	150 killed 76 captured

Operation Geronimo was a joint operation conducted by U.S., South Korean and South Vietnamese forces in Phú Yên Province, lasting from 31 October to 4 December 1966.

== Background ==
Operation Geronimo was planned to harass the battle-damaged People's Army of Vietnam (PAVN) 18B Regiment before the start of the monsoon season. U.S. intelligence indicated that the 18B Regiment was in a base 50km southwest of Tuy Hòa.

1st Brigade commander, BG Willard Pearson deployed the Brigade to Tuy Hoa Air Base in late October. The plan was for 1st Battalion, 327th Infantry Regiment to move along Highway 7B, that paralleled the Đà Rằng River north of the base area, while the 2/327th Infantry would be landed by helicopter to the south. Both Battalions would move at night to conceal the operation. At dawn the Army of the Republic of Vietnam (ARVN) 47th Regiment, 22nd Division, would block Highway 7B to the north and units of the South Korean 28th Regiment, 9th Division, would block Highway 1 to the east. The two U.S. battalions would then sweep east through the base area. The 2nd Battalion, 502nd Infantry Regiment, would remain in reserve at Tuy Hoa. The U.S. Battalions would initially be operating out of range of U.S. artillery support, but Pearson regarded this and the night deployment as acceptable risks given the expected weakened state of the PAVN.

== Operation ==
The operation commenced on the evening of 31 October and the 2 U.S. battalions deployed without incident. The following morning they began their push to the east but only engaged scattered Viet Cong units. Captured documents indicated that the 18B Regiment had left the area one month earlier.

Despite this apparent intelligence failure, new intelligence indicated that the PAVN 95th Regiment had moved into a mountainous base, jungle-covered base area northwest of Tuy Hòa known as "the Hub". BG Pearson devised a new plan where the 1st Brigade would be landed by helicopter northwest of the Hub and sweep east against blocking positions established by the 1st Brigade, 4th Infantry Division in the east and the ARVN 47th Regiment in the south.

The second phase of the operation began on the morning of 6 November. On 8 November the 1st Battalion, 8th Infantry Regiment was added to the sweep forces. On 10 November the U.S. forces located a PAVN base camp and engaged in a battle with the entrenched forces of the 5th Battalion, 95th Regiment that lasted throughout the night and into the next day. An Army psychological warfare team persuaded 35 PAVN soldiers to surrender and the base camp was subsequently overrun. By 24 November signals intelligence indicated that the 95th Regiment had evacuated the area to the west.

== Aftermath ==
Operation Geronimo officially concluded on 4 December, PAVN losses were 150 killed and 76 captured, U.S. losses were 16 killed.
