= Operation John Paul Jones =

Part of the Vietnam War (1966)

- Part of the Vietnam War
Date	21 July – 5 September 1966
Location	Phú Yên Province, South Vietnam 13.1°N 109.182°E
Result	inconclusive

Belligerents
United States	Viet Cong

Commanders and leaders
BG Willard Pearson	

Units involved
1st Brigade, 101st Airborne Division	

Casualties and losses
23 killed	209 killed 135 estimated killed

Operation John Paul Jones was an operation conducted by the 1st Brigade, 101st Airborne Division in Phú Yên Province, lasting from 21 July to 5 September 1966.

== Prelude ==
Brigadier General Willard Pearson sought to use semi-guerilla tactics to locate Viet Cong and People's Army of Vietnam (PAVN) units and then bring firepower and mobility to bear on enemy units once located. Operation John Paul Jones, named after the U.S. Revolutionary war hero, was to proceed in 3 phases.

== Operation ==
=== Phase 1 (21-31 July) ===
On 21 July 1966 the 1st Brigade secured Highway 1 and the Vũng Rô Pass to secure the area for the construction of a new port facility in Vũng Rô Bay. As minimal enemy activity was detected at the end of the month General Pearson began to move his forces north to the Tuy Hòa area.

=== Phase 2 (2-15 August) ===
On 2 August B-52s bombed the area west of Sông Cầu and 20 minutes later the 2nd Battalion, 502nd Infantry Regiment was landed by helicopter and proceeded to search the area finding no sign of the enemy and withdrawing the following day.

On 8 August following another B-52 strike near Dong Tre, 1st Battalion, 327th Infantry Regiment was landed by helicopter and captured 8 prisoners including a Captain from the PAVN 5th Division. The prisoners confirmed that the 5th Division headquarters was located in the province and that the 18B and 95th Regiments were operating nearby. On 9 August 2/502nd was deployed further west and moved east in an attempt to trap fleeing PAVN/VC but none were encountered. Both units returned to base by 15 August.

=== Phase 3 (16 August-5 September) ===
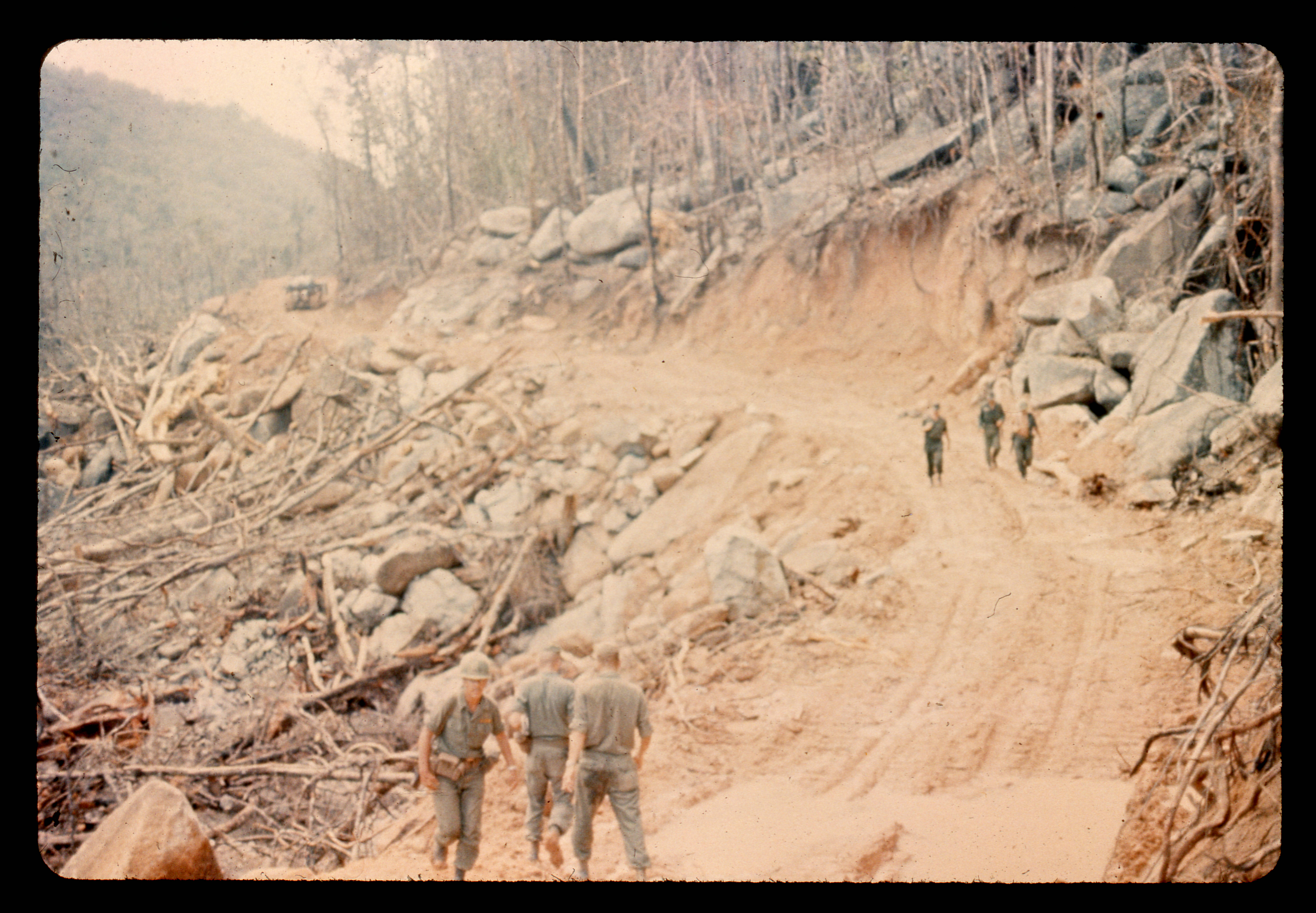
Road from Highway 1 to Vung Ro Bay constructed during the operation, 5 September 1966

On 16 August 2nd Battalion, 8th Cavalry Regiment was opconned to the 1st Brigade. On 17 August 2/8 Cavalry and 2/327th were deployed west of Dong Tre but found nothing.

On 26 August intelligence indicated the presence of enemy forces further west and 2/8 Cavalry and 2/327th were deployed further west to try to pin the enemy force against Army of the Republic of Vietnam blocking forces, but once again they found nothing.

== Aftermath ==
Operation John Paul Jones officially concluded on 5 September, Viet Cong losses were 209 killed by body count and a further 135 estimates killed, U.S. losses were 23 killed.
