= Operation Harrison =

Part of the Vietnam War (1966)

- Part of the Vietnam War
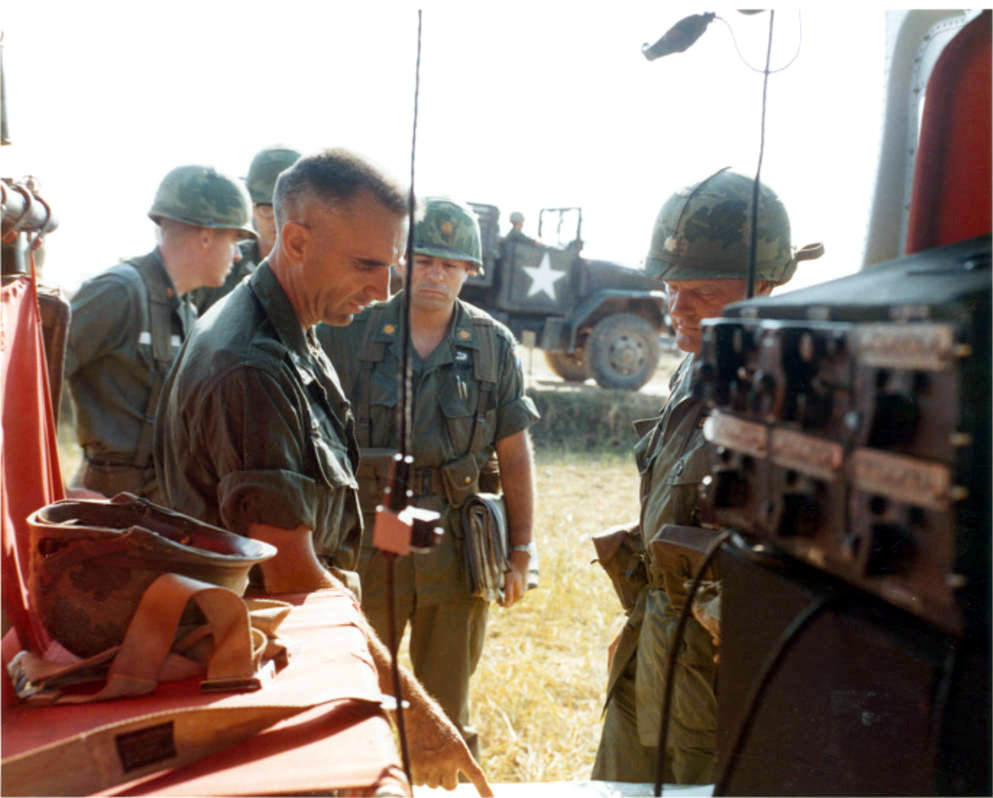
- LTC Joseph B. Rogers commander of 1/327th Infantry briefs BG Willard Pearson during Operation Harrison
Date	26 February-25 March 1966
Location	Phú Yên Province, South Vietnam 13.1°N 109.182°E
Result	Inconclusive

Belligerents
United States	North Vietnam

Commanders and leaders
BG Willard Pearson; Maj David Hackworth	

Units involved
1st Brigade, 101st Airborne Division	4th Battalion, 95th Regiment

Casualties and losses
42 killed 2 missing	288 killed 35 captured

Operation Harrison was an operation conducted by the 1st Brigade, 101st Airborne Division in Phú Yên Province, lasting from 26 February to 25 March 1966.

== Prelude ==
Brigadier General Pearson sought to use semi-guerrilla tactics to locate Viet Cong and People's Army of Vietnam (PAVN) units and then bring firepower and mobility to bear on enemy units once located.

== Operation ==
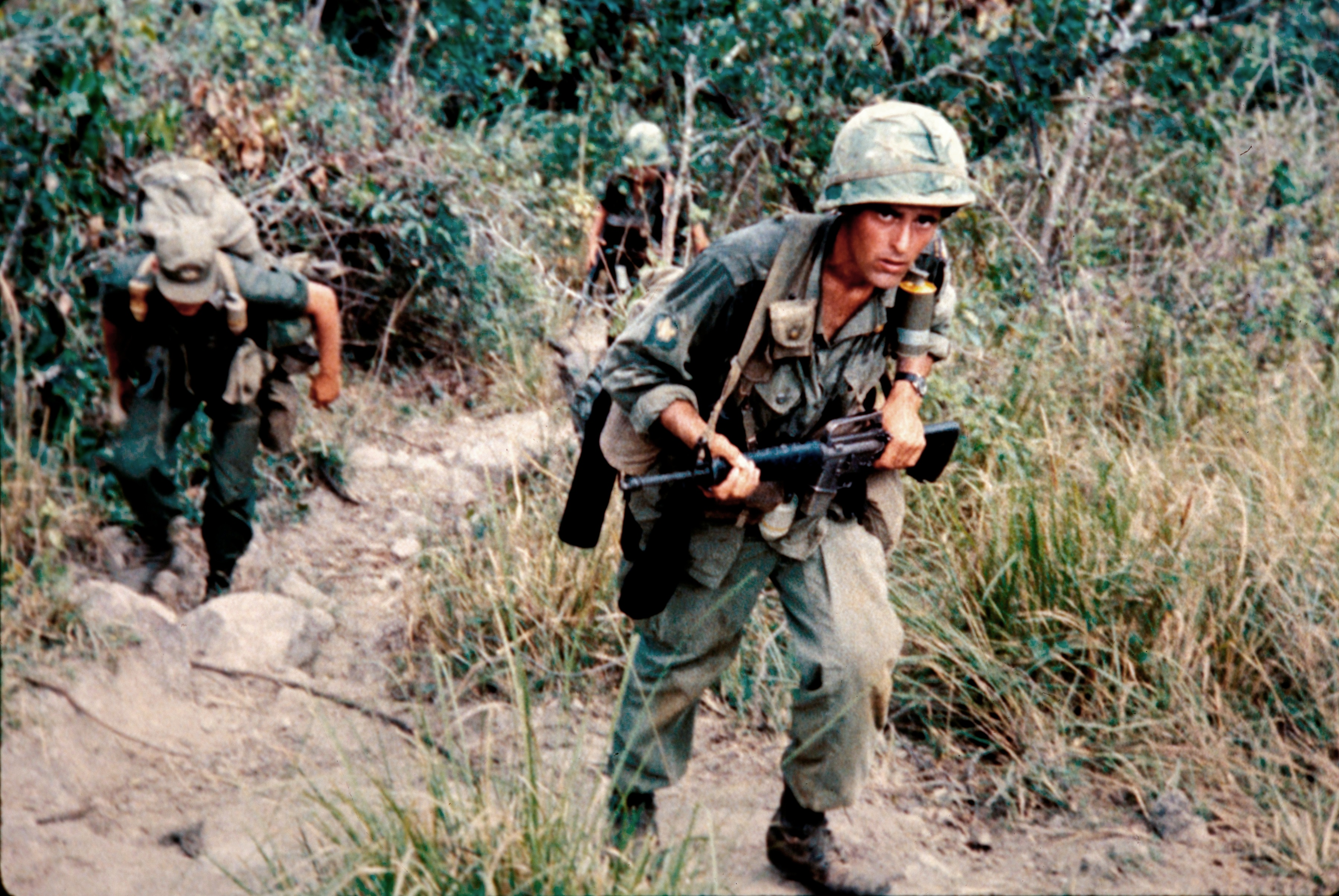
2/502 infantrymen climbing a hill, 27 February

On 26 February the 2nd Battalion, 502nd Infantry Regiment was deployed by helicopter 30 km northwest of Tuy Hòa, while the 2nd Battalion, 327th Infantry Regiment was landed by helicopter 10 km southeast. The units were unable to locate any enemy forces.

On 4 March in the Tuy Hòa Valley, 16 km southwest of Tuy Hòa City a villager approached the command post of the 1/327th which was providing rice harvest security to advise them that he had seen PAVN troops with mortars moving towards the village of Thanh Phu, 3 km to the southwest. Two rifle companies were deployed towards Thanh Phu. As Company B passed the hamlet of My Phu they were hit by enemy fire. Company A proceeded to attack the hamlet across two dry rice paddies suffering heavy losses. Major David Hackworth arrived on the scene in the late afternoon and took command. The two companies made slow progress and by nightfall they disengaged. Hackworth tried to establish a night cordon around the PAVN but lacked the manpower to do so, so instead positioned Tiger Force south of the hamlet and used artillery fire to cover the gaps in the cordon. The PAVN slipped away during the night, but the following morning 109 PAVN bodies were found around the hamlet. U.S. losses were 19 killed.

On 5 March 2/327th relieved 1/327th which moved further west. On 13 March 2/502nd made an unusual night assault to exploit a B-52 strike but found no enemy, a similar assault on 15 March was also fruitless. Prisoner interrogations revealed that the 95th Regiment had broken into small units and dispersed west into the mountains.

== Aftermath ==
Operation Harrison officially concluded on 25 March, the US claiming PAVN losses were 288 killed and 35 captured, U.S. losses were 42 killed and 2 missing.
