= I Field Force, Vietnam =

Corps-level command of the U.S. Army during the Vietnam War

- I Field Force Vietnam shoulder sleeve insignia
- Active: 1966–1971
- Country: United States of America
- Branch: United States Army
- Type: Command
- Size: Corps
- Part of: Military Assistance Command, Vietnam
- Headquarters: Nha Trang
- Engagements: Vietnam War

Insignia
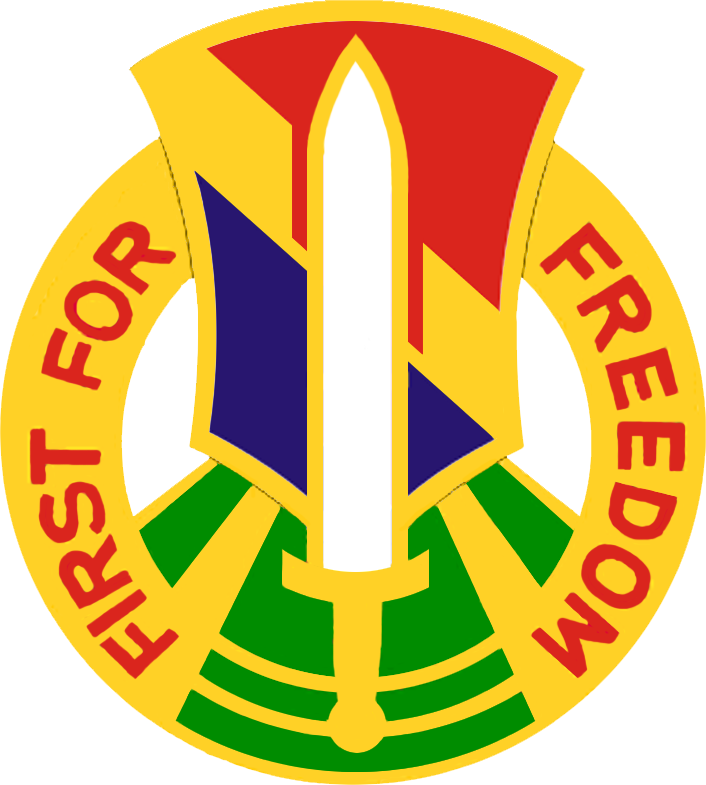
- Distinctive Unit Insignia

I Field Force, Vietnam was a corps-level command of the United States Army during the Vietnam War. Activated on 25 September 1965 as Field Force Vietnam, it was derived (with significant changes) from Task Force Alpha, a provisional corps command created 1 August 1965 for temporary control of activities of U.S. Army ground combat forces arriving in Vietnam. Field Force Vietnam was renamed I Field Force Vietnam on 15 March 1966. I Field Force was a component of U.S. Military Assistance Command Vietnam (MACV) and had its headquarters at Nha Trang.

== Area of Responsibility and Units Assigned ==
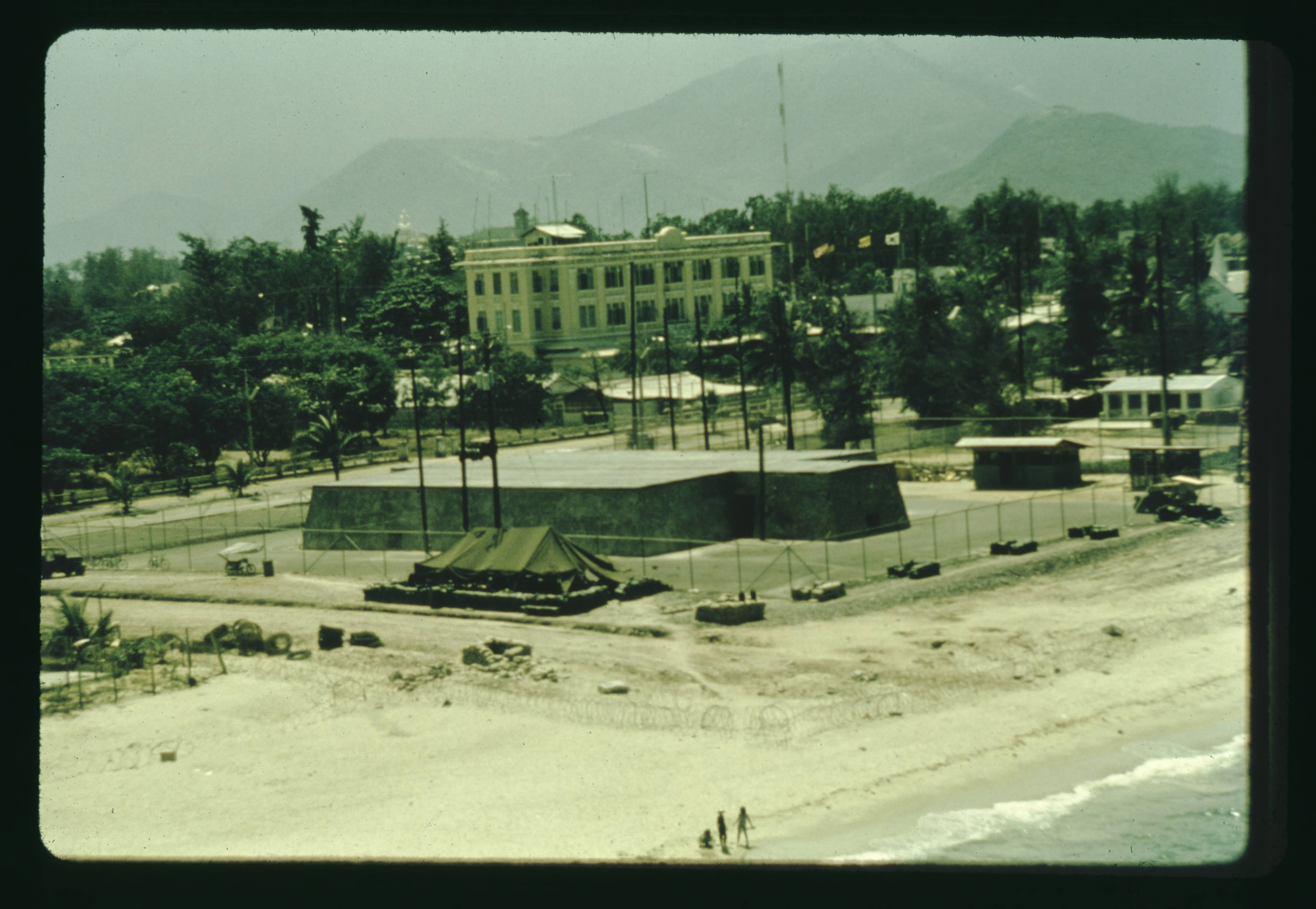
I Field Force Tactical Operations Center, Nha Trang, 13 July 1968

I Field Force's area of responsibility was II Corps Tactical Zone, later renamed Military Region 2, which comprised the seven provinces of Vietnam's Central Highlands and five coastal provinces. (Task Force Alpha, the predecessor organization, had also controlled forces in III Corps Tactical Zone). Among the divisions and brigades under I Field Force Vietnam were:

- 1st Cavalry Division (Airmobile)
- 4th Infantry Division
- 3d Brigade, 25th Infantry Division (Reassigned to 4th Infantry Division August 1967)
- 1st Brigade, 101st Airborne Division
- 173rd Airborne Brigade
- 41st Artillery Group
- 52nd Artillery Group (June 1966 - June 1971)
- 77th Radar Detachment
- 54th Signal Battalion

== Inactivation ==
I Field Force was inactivated on 30 April 1971 during the withdrawal of U.S. ground combat forces from Vietnam, and its assets formed the basis for its successor, the Second Regional Assistance Command (SRAC).

== Commanders ==
- LTG Stanley R. Larsen March 1966 – July 1967
- LTG William B. Rosson July 1967– February 1968
- LTG William R. Peers March 1968 – March 1969
- LTG Charles A. Corcoran March 1969 – March 1970
- LTG Arthur S. Collins Jr. March 1970 – January 1971
- MG Charles P. Brown January 1971 – April 1971

== Sources ==
- Eckhardt, George (1991). Vietnam Studies: Command and Control. Washington, D.C.: Department of the Army. OCLC 1030922. Archived from the original on 19 October 2017.
- Stanton, Shelby (1981). Vietnam Order of Battle. Washington, D.C.: U.S. News Books. ISBN 0-89193-700-5.
