= Stanley R. Larsen =

United States Army general (1915–2000)

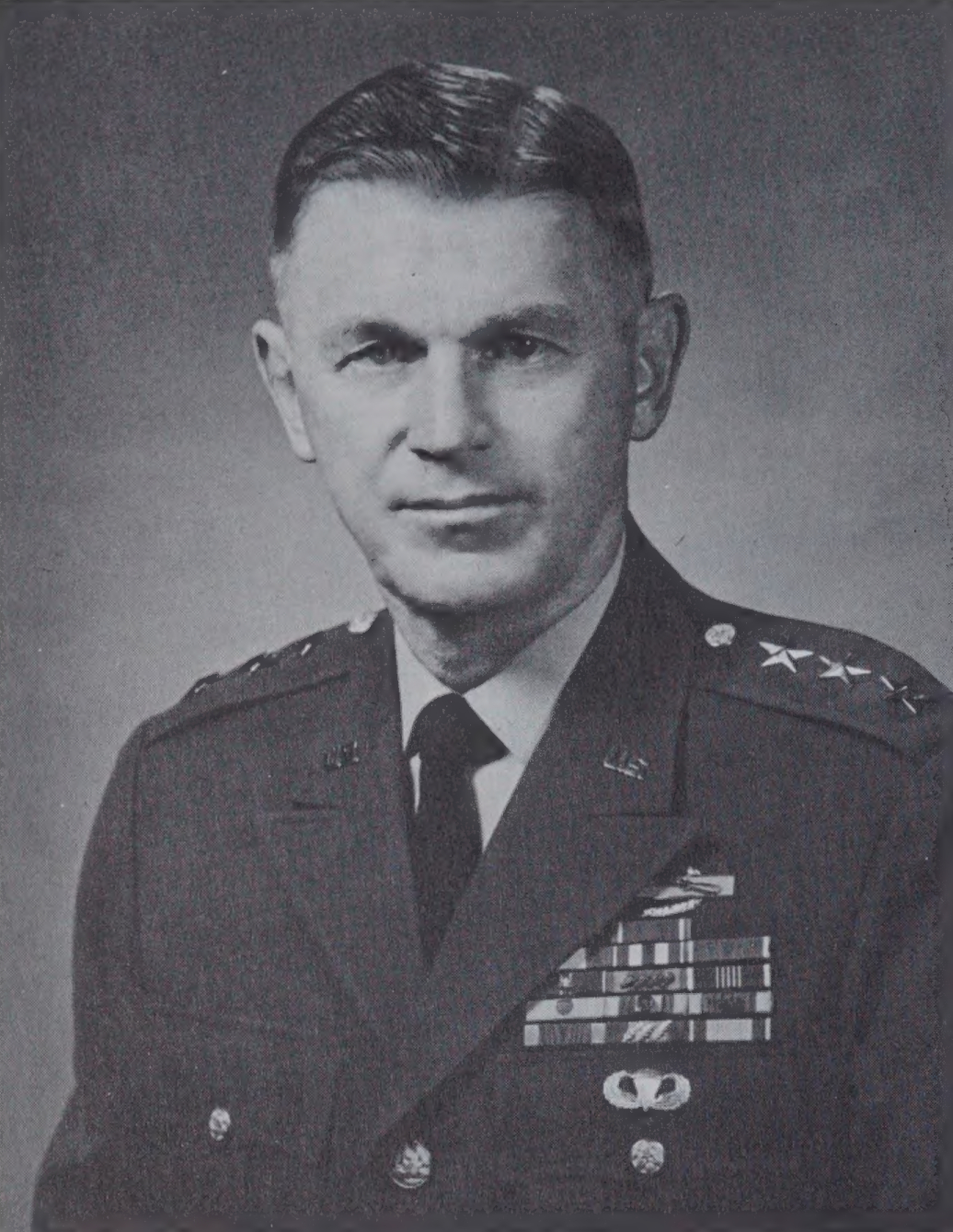
- Larsen as Sixth United States Army commander c. 1969
- Born: November 11, 1915; Honolulu, Hawaii
- Died: November 1, 2000 (aged 84); Talladega, Alabama
- Burial place: Oak Hill Cemetery, Talladega
- Military career
- Allegiance: United States
- Branch: United States Army
- Service years: 1938–1972
- Rank: Lieutenant General
- Nickname: "Swede"
- Commands: Sixth United States Army; I Field Force, Vietnam; 8th Infantry Division
- Conflicts: World War II; Vietnam War
- Awards: Distinguished Service Cross; Army Distinguished Service Medal (3); Silver Star; Legion of Merit; Bronze Star Medal

Stanley Robert Larsen (November 11, 1915 – November 1, 2000) was a United States Army lieutenant general who served as commander of I Field Force, Vietnam during the Vietnam War.

== Military career ==
Larsen attended the United States Military Academy at West Point, graduating in 1939. He served in the 35th Infantry Regiment, leading its 2nd Battalion in the Second Battle of Mount Austen during the Guadalcanal Campaign of World War II.

Larsen later commanded the 8th Infantry Division from November 1962 to April 1964, Task Force Alpha (later renamed I Field Force, Vietnam) from 4 August 1965 to July 1967, and the Sixth United States Army until April 1971.
