= Willard Pearson =

United States Army general (1915–1996)

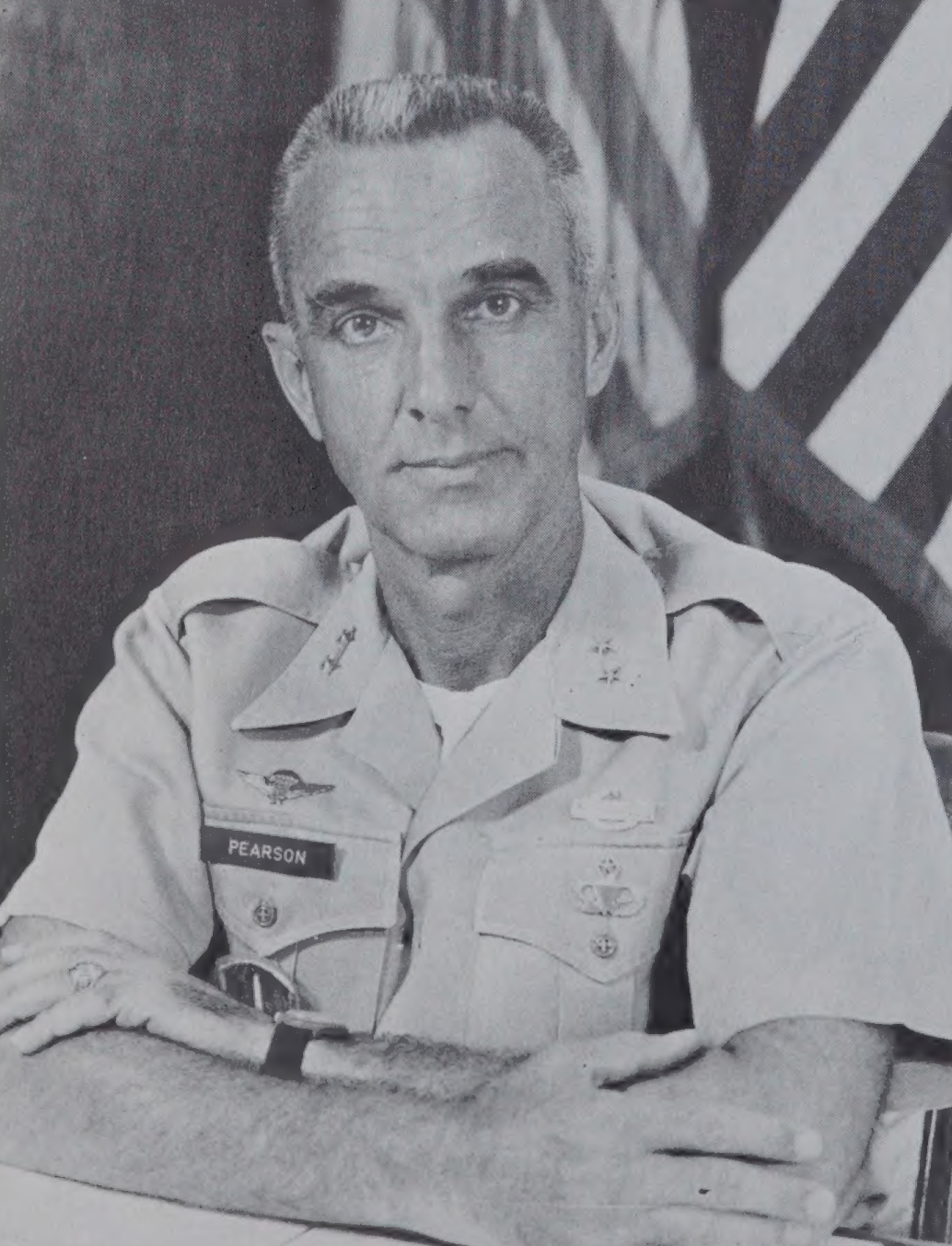
- Pearson as Commanding General of Fort Lewis Army Training Center c. 1969
- Born: July 4, 1915
- Died: March 6, 1996 (aged 80)
- Military career
- Allegiance: United States of America
- Branch: United States Army
- Service years: 1938–1973
- Rank: Lieutenant General
- Commands: 1st Brigade, 101st Airborne Division; V Corps
- Conflicts: World War II; Vietnam War
- Awards: Distinguished Service Medal; Silver Star

Willard Pearson (July 4, 1915 – March 6, 1996) was a United States Army Lieutenant General who served as commander of the 1st Brigade, 101st Airborne Division during the Vietnam War and later as commander of V Corps.

== Early life and education ==
Pearson was born on July 4, 1915, and he was a native of West Elizabeth, Pennsylvania. Pearson was a graduate of George Washington University.

== Military service ==
=== Vietnam War ===
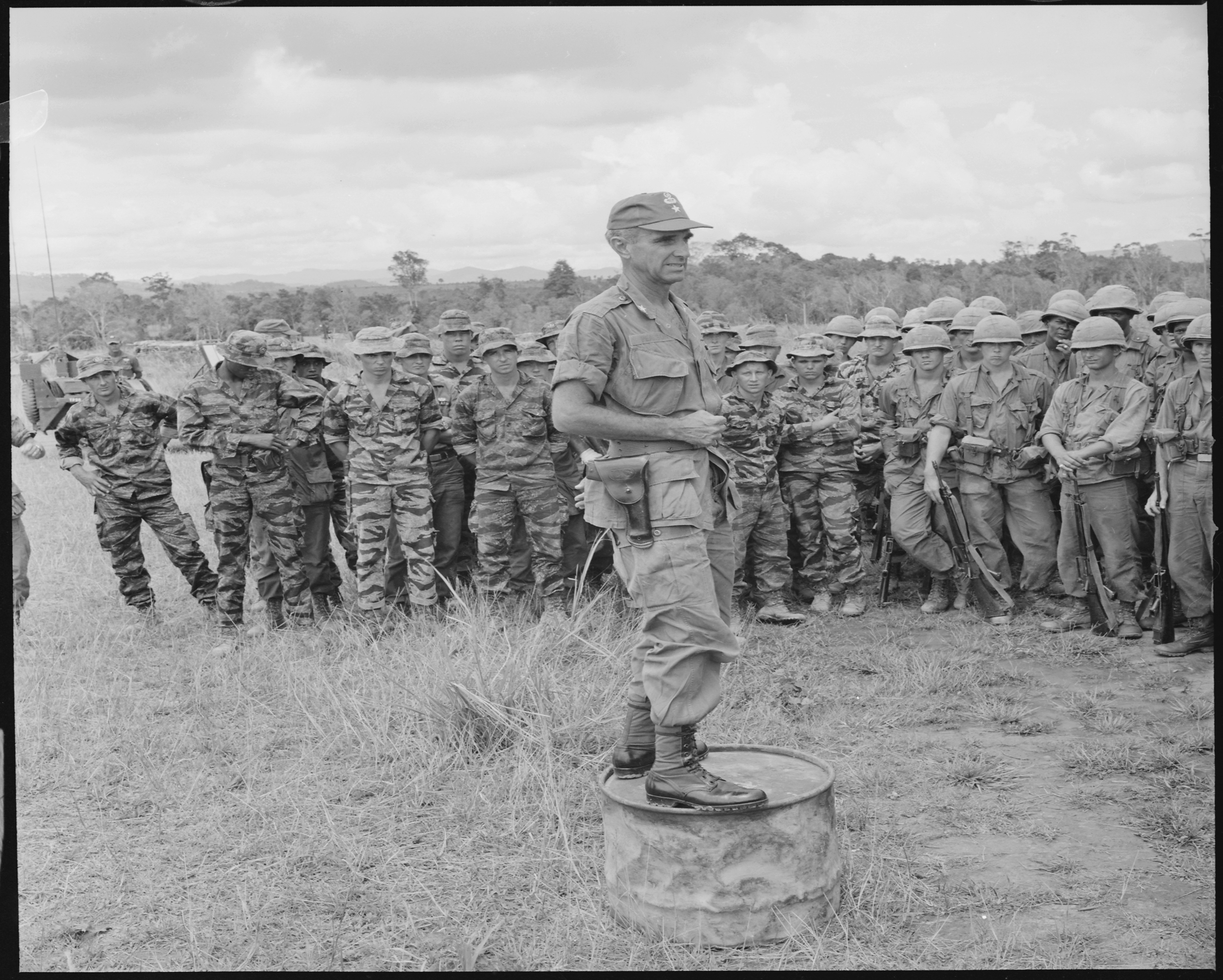
BG Pearson briefs troops before Operation Eagle Bait c. 1966

In January 1966 BG Pearson took command of the 1st Brigade, 101st Airborne Division. During his time in command of the 1st Brigade he advocated the use of semi-guerilla tactics of night operations and long range reconnaissance patrols, which were adopted by his subordinate Maj. David Hackworth who established Tiger Force. These tactics involved "to probe as far into enemy territory as possible, make contact, then reinforce by helicopter." Pearson was described as being "regarded with a mixture of respect and astonishment."

=== Post Vietnam ===
He served as commander of V Corps from 14 February 1971 to 31 May 1973 when he retired from the Army.

== Later life ==
He served as superintendent of the Valley Forge Military Academy and College from 1973 to 1985.

== Personal life ==
Pearson was married to Reba E Barton until his death. 1973 Pearson was bestowed with the Commander's cross of the Order of Merit of the Federal Republic of Germany.
