= List of allied military operations of the Vietnam War (1966) =

This article is a list of known military operations of the Vietnam War in 1966, conducted by the armed forces of the Republic of Vietnam, the United States and their allies.

Date Duration	Operation Name	Unit(s) – Description	Location	VC–PAVN KIA	Allied KIAs
1966	Operation Lightning Bug	USAF air interdiction operations			
Jan 1 – 8	Operation Marauder/Operation An Dan 564	1st Infantry Division, 173rd Airborne Brigade, 1st Battalion, Royal Australian Regiment and ARVN operation in Plain of Reeds area of the Mekong Delta	Hậu Nghĩa Province	268	15 US, 31 ARVN
Jan 1 – 18	Operation Jefferson	A combined ROK 2nd Marine Brigade and paratroops of ARVN 47th Regiment search and destroy operation	Phú Yên Province		
Jan 1 – 20	Operation Matador III	1/1 Cavalry search and destroy operation along the Cambodian border	Kon Tum and Pleiku Provinces		
Jan 3 – 4	Operation War Bonnet	2nd Battalion, 9th Marines and 3rd Tank Battalion search and destroy operation	Quảng Nam Province		
Jan 3 – 8	Operation Hang Over	2nd Battalion, 327th Infantry Regiment search and destroy operation	Ninh Thuận Province		
Jan 3 – 8	Operation Long Lance	1st Battalion, 1st Marines search and destroy operation	Quảng Nam Province		
Jan 3 – 8	Operation Quick Kick	1st Brigade, 1st Infantry Division search and destroy operation	Bình Dương Province		
Jan 8 – 14	Operation Crimp	Operation by two brigades of the 1st Infantry Division and the 1st Battalion, Royal Australian Regiment	Ho Bo Woods, 20 km north of Cu Chi, Bình Dương Province	129	22
Jan 9 – 11	Operation Flying Tiger VI	ARVN and ROK Capital Division search and destroy operation	Bình Định Province	192	11
Jan 11 – 14	Operation Quick Kick II	1st Brigade, 1st Infantry Division search and destroy operation	Bình Dương Province		
Jan 11 – 17	Operation Mallard	1st Battalion, 3rd Marines and 3rd Battalion, 7th Marines search and destroy operation	An Hoa, Quảng Nam Province		
Jan 12 – 25	Operation Short Fuse	2/1 Cavalry search and destroy operation	Tây Ninh Province		
Jan 12 – 31	Operation Buckskin	3rd Brigade, 1st Infantry Division search and destroy operation. Follow-up to Operation Crimp	Ho Bo Woods to the north and west of Cu Chi	93	
Jan 13 – 17	Operation Matador II	2/1 Cavalry search and destroy operation	Bình Định, Kon Tum and Pleiku Provinces		
Jan 13 – 17	Operation Quick Hop/Operation Tyler	2nd Battalion, 327th Airborne Infantry Regiment search and destroy operation	Bình Thuận Province		
Jan 15 – 17	Operation Big Lodge	2nd Battalion, 9th Marines search and destroy operation	Quảng Nam Province		
Jan 15 – 19	Operation Red Ball IV	1st Brigade, 1st Infantry Division resupply operation	III Corps		
Jan 17 – 18	Operation Pioneer I	2nd Battalion, 16th Infantry Regiment search and destroy operation	Biên Hòa Province		
Jan 18 – 20	Operation Retriever I	173rd Airborne Brigade search and destroy operation	Binh Hoa and Bình Dương Provinces		
Jan 19 – Feb 21	Operation Van Buren	101st Airborne Division, ROK 2nd Marine Brigade and ARVN 47th Regiment rice security operation	Phú Yên Province	679	54 US, 45 ROK
Jan 20 – 24	Operation Kamehameha I	3rd Brigade, 25th Infantry Division security operation along Route 19	Pleiku Province		
Jan 24 – 26	Operation Pioneer II	2nd Brigade, 1st Infantry Division search and destroy operation	Biên Hòa Province		
Jan 24 – 26	Operation Quick Kick III	1st Brigade, 1st Infantry Division search and destroy operation	Bình Dương Province		
Jan 24 – 30	Operation Retriever II	173rd Airborne Brigade search and destroy operation	Binh Hoa and Bình Dương Provinces		
Jan 24 – Mar 6	Operation Masher/White Wing/Thang Phong II	1st Cavalry Division, ARVN 22nd Division Airborne Brigade and 1st Regiment ROK Capital Division operation USMC Operation Double Eagle links in cross border segment	Bình Định Province	2389	288 US, 10 ROK, 119 ARVN
Jan 28 – Feb 1	Operation Red Ball V	1st Brigade, 1st Infantry Division resupply operation	Bình Dương Province		
Jan 28 – Feb 15	Operation Mallet	2nd Brigade, 1st Infantry Division search and destroy operation to open Route 15	Long Khánh Province		
Jan 28 – Feb 17	Operation Double Eagle	3rd Battalion, 1st Marines, 2nd Battalion, 3rd Marines, 2nd Battalion, 4th Marines, 2nd Battalion, 9th Marines operation linking in with Operation Masher/White Wing, Operation Lien Ket 22 and Operation Thang Phuong II	Quảng Ngãi and Quảng Trị Provinces	312	24
Jan 29 – 31	Operation Kamehameha II	3rd Brigade, 25th Infantry Division security operation along Route 19	Pleiku Province		
Jan 30 – 31	Operation Bobcat	US search and destroy operation	III Corps		
Jan 30 – Feb 3	Operation Bobcat Tracker	2nd Brigade, 25th Infantry Division search and destroy operation	Hậu Nghĩa Province		
Feb	Operation Reconstruction	1st Brigade, 101st Airborne Division, ROK 2nd Marine Brigade and ARVN 47th Regiment search and destroy operation	south of Tuy Hòa Phú Yên Province		
Feb 3 – 9	Operation Quick Kick IV	1st Brigade, 1st Infantry Division search and destroy operation	Bình Dương Province		
Feb 3 – 15	Operation Taro Leaf	2nd Brigade, 25th Infantry Division search and destroy operation	Hậu Nghĩa Province		
Feb 4- 9	Operation Roundhouse	173rd Airborne Brigade and 1st Battalion, Royal Australian Regiment search and destroy operation	Biên Hòa and Bình Dương Provinces		
Feb 5 – 8	Operation Taylor	3rd Brigade, 25th Infantry Division search and destroy and road clearing operation	Kon Tum and Pleiku Provinces		
Feb 6 – Mar 6	Operation Thừa Thiên 177	ARVN operation	Thừa Thiên Province	183	17
Feb 7 – 11	Operation Road Runner VI	3rd Brigade, 1st Infantry Division road clearing and security operation along Route 13	north of Bến Cát District, Bình Dương Province		
Feb 7 – 16	Operation Taut Bow	3rd Reconnaissance Battalion reconnaissance in force operation	"Happy Valley", Quảng Nam Province		
Feb 7 – May 1972	Operation Shed Light	USAF programme to develop night and adverse weather interdiction capabilities	South Vietnam & Laos		
Feb 8 – 9	Operation Bald Eagle	3rd Brigade, 1st Infantry Division search and destroy operation	III Corps		
Feb 9 – 21	Operation Kamehameha III	3rd Brigade, 25th Infantry Division security operation along Route 19	Bình Định and Pleiku Provinces		
Feb 11 – 28	Operation Eagle's Claw	1st Cavalry Division operation	Bình Định Province	340	172
Feb 11 – Mar 2	Operation Rolling Stone	1st Infantry Brigade, 1st Battalion, Royal Australian Regiment and the New Zealand artillery combined search and destroy, road repair, and pacification operation	30 km northwest of Bien Hoa Air Base, Bình Dương Province	154	11 US
Feb 12 – 16	Operation Entree	173rd Airborne Brigade search and destroy operation	Biên Hòa Province		
Feb 12 – 16	Operation Evansville	1st Infantry Division search and destroy operation	Bình Dương Province		
Feb 13	Operation An Dan 14/66	ARVN operation	Long An Province	150	21
Feb 14 – 16	Operation Breezeway	1st Battalion, 16th Infantry Regiment road clearing and security operation along Route 13	Bình Dương Province		
Feb 14 – 16	Operation Paddy Bridge	2nd Battalion, 27th Infantry Regiment search and destroy operation	Hậu Nghĩa Province		
Feb 15 – 21	Operation Thang Long 234	ARVN operation	Darlac Province	270	62
Feb 17 – 28	Operation Double Eagle II	BLT 3rd Battalion, 1st Marines and 3rd Battalion, 12th Marines search and destroy operation to engage the 1st VC Regiment	Que Son Valley	125	
Feb 18 – 19	Operation Belt Line	3rd Brigade, 1st Infantry Division road clearing and security operation along Route 13	Bình Dương Province		
Feb 21 – 27	Operation Mastiff	2nd and 3rd Brigades, 1st Infantry Division search and destroy operation	Michelin Rubber Plantation and the Boi Loi woods, Bình Dương, Binh Long and Tây Ninh Provinces		
Feb 22 – 24	Operation Clean Sweep I	2nd Brigade, 25th Infantry Division and ARVN 49th Regiment search and destroy operation	Cu Chi area	11	5 US
Feb 22 – Mar 2	Operation Lam Son 235	2 Regiments of the ARVN 1st Division search and destroy operation	Quảng Trị Province	444	35
Feb 25 – Mar 24	Operation Garfield	3rd Brigade, 25th Infantry Division operation	Darlac Province	124	17
Feb 26 – 28	Operation Kolchak I	2nd Brigade, 25th Infantry Division search and destroy operation	Hậu Nghĩa Province	5	
Feb 26 – Mar 1	Operation Phoenix	173rd Airborne Brigade search and destroy operation	Biên Hòa Province		15
Feb 26 – Mar 24	Operation Harrison	1st Brigade, 101st Airborne Division search and clear operation	Tuy Hòa area, Phú Yên Province	285	42
Feb 27 – Mar 3	Operation New York	2nd Battalion, 1st Marines, and HMM-163 sweep operation joining with ARVN Operation Thừa Thiên 177	east of Phu Bai, Thừa Thiên Province	122	15
Mar 1 – 2	Operation Beer Barrel	3rd Brigade, 1st Infantry Division road security operation	Bình Dương Province		
Mar 1 – 5	Operation Black Horse	2/1 Cavalry search and destroy operation	Bình Định Province		
Mar 1 – 5	Operation Hattiesburg	2nd Brigade, 1st Infantry Division search and destroy operation	Tây Ninh Province		
Mar 3 – 6	Operation Red Ball VI	1st Brigade, 1st Infantry Division route security for resupply convoys	Biên Hòa and Bình Dương Provinces		
Mar 3 – 7	Operation Cocoa Beach	3rd Brigade, 1st Infantry Division search and destroy operation	Bình Dương Province	199	15
Mar 4	Operation Waikiki	2nd Brigade, 25th Infantry Division search and destroy operation	Hậu Nghĩa Province		
Mar 4 – 7	Operation Utah/Operation Lien Ket 26	3rd Battalion, 1st Marines, 2nd Battalion, 4th Marines, 1st Battalion, 7th Marines, 2nd Battalion, 7th Marines and ARVN 2nd Division search and destroy operation against the PAVN 36th Regiment and VC Main Force units operation. First USMC contact with the NVA	11 km northwest of Quảng Ngãi City,	632	83 US, 32 ARVN
Mar 6 – 8	Operation Boston	3rd Brigade, 1st Infantry Division search and destroy operation	Bình Dương Province		
Mar 7 – 24	Operation Silver City	1st Brigade, 1st Infantry Division, 173rd Airborne Brigade, 1st Battalion, Royal Australian Regiment and ARVN 10th Division search and destroy operation. Major enemy unit encountered is the VC 271st Main Force Regiment	along the Song Be River, Bình Dương Province/Long Khánh Province border area	336	107
Mar 7 – 28	Operation Jim Bowie	2/1 Cavalry and 3/1 Cavalry search and destroy operation	Bình Định Province		
Mar 9 – 10	Operation Los Angeles	3rd Brigade, 1st Infantry Division route and convoy security operation along Route 13	Bình Dương Province		
Mar 12	Operation Toledo	3rd Brigade, 1st Infantry Division security operation	III Corps	11	9
Mar 13 – 15	Operation Tampa (1966)	3rd Brigade, 1st Infantry Division security operation	III Corps		
Mar 13 – 17	Operation Salem	1st Battalion, 18th Infantry Regiment search and destroy operation	III Corps		
Mar 14 – 19	Operation Honolulu	2nd Brigade, 25th Infantry Division search and destroy operation	Cu Chi, Hậu Nghĩa Province		
Mar 14 – 21	Operation Buchanan/Operation Wyatt Earp/Operation Kam IV	2/1 Cavalry 2nd Battalion, 35th Infantry Regiment reconnaissance in force and security operation along Route 19	II Corps		
Mar 14 – 21	Operation Wyatt Earp	2/1 Cavalry and 2nd Battalion, 35th Infantry Regiment reconnaissance in force and security operation on Route 19	II Corps		
Mar 17 – 18	Operation Wheaton	2nd Brigade, 1st Infantry Division operation	III Corps		
Mar 17 - 18	Operation Massachusetts	2nd Battalion, 4th Marines			
Mar 18 – 19	Operation Palestine	3rd Brigade, 1st Infantry Division security operation	III Corps		
Mar 20 – 23	Operation Oregon	2nd Battalion, 1st Marines and 1st Battalion, 4th Marines search and destroy operation	Quảng Trị Province		
Mar 20 – 24	Operation Cuu Long 15	ARVN operation	Kien Tuong Province	219	3
Mar 20 – 25	Operation Texas/Operation Lien Ket 28	3rd Battalion, 1st Marines, 3rd Battalion, 7th Marines, 2nd Battalion, 4th Marines, ARVN 5th Airborne Battalion and Republic of Vietnam Marine Corps combined reaction force operation landing near An Hoa to encounter the 60th and 90th battalions of the 1st VC Regiment and the 11th Battalion, 21st NVA Regiment	An Hoa	623	99
Mar 20 – 28	Operation Kings	3rd Battalion, 3rd Marines, 2nd Battalion, 9th Marines and 3rd Tank Battalion search and destroy operation	25 km southwest of Da Nang, Quảng Nam Province		
Mar 21	Operation Lê Lợi 15	ARVN Special Forces operation	Darlac Province	134	10
Mar 21 – May 5	Operation Benning	US security operation	II Corps		
Mar 23 – 25	Operation Brownsville	3rd Brigade, 1st Infantry Division search and destroy operation	III Corps		
Mar 23 – 26	Operation Brunswick	US security and road clearing operation along Route 13	III Corps		
Mar 23 – 27	Operation Mang Ho V	ROKA Capital Division search and destroy operation	Bình Định Province	349	17
Mar 23 – 27	Operation Monroe	2nd Brigade, 1st Infantry Division search and destroy operation	III Corps		
Mar 24 – 25	Operation Waycross	1st Brigade, 1st Infantry Division and ARVN 5th Division search and destroy operation	northwest of Phu Loi, Bình Dương Province		
Mar 24 – 26	Operation Dan Chi 211/B	ARVN operation	Ba Xuyen Province	245	17
Mar 24 – 29	Operation Olympa	3rd Brigade, 1st Infantry Division search and destroy operation	Bình Dương Province		
Mar 25 – Apr 8	Operation Lincoln	1st and 3d Brigades, 1st Cavalry Division and 3rd Brigade, 25th Infantry Division search and destroy/reconnaissance in force operation against the same PAVN units that had participated in the battle of the Ia Drang Valley	vicinity of Plei Me and the Chu Pong Massif, Pleiku and Darlac Provinces	522	51
Mar 26 – Jul 21	Operation Fillmore	1st Brigade, 101st Airborne Division, ROK 2nd Marine Brigade and ARVN 47th Regiment operation	vicinity of Tuy Hòa, Phú Yên Province	134	8 US
Mar 26 – Apr 6	Operation Jackstay	SLF 1st Battalion, 5th Marines and 2 Battalions of Vietnamese Marines search and clear operation along the Long Tau shipping channel	Rung Sat Special Zone	63	6
Mar 26 – Sep 23	Operation Su Bok	ROK Capital Division operation	Bình Định Province	299	23
Mar 27 – Apr 1	Operation Red Ball VII	1st Battalion, 28th Infantry Regiment search and destroy operation	III Corps		
Mar 27 – May 5	Operation Buchanan II	2/1 Cavalry 2nd Battalion, 35th Infantry Regiment road clearing operation along Route 19 from Qui Nhơn to Pleiku	Pleiku Province		
Mar 28 – 30	Operation Indiana/Operation Lien Ket 30	1st Battalion, 7th Marines and ARVN 5th Regiment, 2nd Division operation to reinforce ARVN Operation Quyet Tang 72	Quảng Ngãi Province	169	11
Mar 29 – 30	Operation Alabama	USMC search and destroy operation	III Corps		
Mar 29 – Apr 5	Operation Circle Pines	1st Battalion, 5th Infantry Regiment and ARVN 7th Regiment operation	Ho Bo Woods, Hậu Nghĩa Province	170	32
Mar 30 – Apr 15	Operation Abilene	1st Infantry Division and 1st Battalion, Royal Australian Regiment operation	Phước Tuy Province	92	48
Apr	Operation Cuu Long 7	ARVN 7th Division search and destroy operation	Kien Tuong Province	140	11
Apr	Operation Lam Son 255	ARVN 1st Division operation	Quảng Tín Province	33	
Apr	Operation Nevada/Operation Lien Ket 34	1st Battalion, 2nd Marines, 2nd Battalion, 7th Marines, ARVN 2nd Division and VNMC search and destroy operation	Batangan Peninsula, Quảng Ngãi Province	68	3
Apr 1 – 7	Operation York	1st Battalion, 28th Infantry Regiment search and destroy operation	III Corps		
Apr 1 – 11	Operation Orange	1st Battalion, 3rd Marines search and destroy operation	near Thường Ðức, 40 km southwest of Da Nang, Quảng Nam Province	57	18
Apr 2 – 13	Operation Bun Kae 66-5	ROK Capital Division operation	Bình Định Province	292	23
Apr 6 – 8	Operation Kahuku	1st Battalion, 5th Infantry Regiment and ARVN 49th Regiment search and destroy operation	west of Cu Chi	26	
Apr 8 – 10	Operation Iowa	3rd Battalion, 1st Marines and 2nd Battalion, 4th Marines search and destroy operation	Quảng Tín Province		
Apr 9 – 25	Operation Denver	173rd Airborne Brigade and 1st Battalion, Royal Australian Regiment search and destroy operation	vicinity of Sông Bé, Phước Long Province		
Apr 11 – 14	Operation Makaha	2nd Brigade, 25th Infantry Division search and destroy operation northwest of Cu Chi	Hậu Nghĩa Province		
Apr 11 – 17	Operation Mosby I (part of Operation Lincoln)	1/1 Cavalry 3/1 Cavalry and 5th Battalion, 14th Cavalry Regiment reconnaissance in force along Cambodian border	western Kon Tum and Pleiku Provinces		
Apr 12 – May 18	Operation Austin	1st Brigade, 101st Airborne Division operations	Bình Thuận, Bình Tuy, Lâm Đồng, Phước Long and Quang Doc Provinces		
Apr 12 – 26	Operation Austin I	1st Brigade, 101st Airborne Division search and destroy operation	upper Dak Som River valley, III Corps		
Apr 12 – 26	Operation Austin II	1st Brigade, 101st Airborne Division search and destroy operation	northwest of Phan Thiết		
Apr 13 – 14	Operation Kaena	2nd Brigade, 25th Infantry Division search and destroy operation in support of Operation Makaha	Hậu Nghĩa Province		
Apr 13 – 14	Operation Kalamazoo	1st Battalion, 5th Infantry Regiment operation	Ho Bo Woods northwest of Cu Chi	26	7
Apr 13 – May 1	Operation Longfellow	3rd Brigade, 25th Infantry Division and ARVN 42nd Regiment search and destroy operation to search the area west of Route 14 north from Dak To toward Dak Pek in support of Army Engineers repairing and improving Route 14	Kon Tum Province		
Apr 14 – 16	Operation Quyet Thang 184	ARVN 2nd Division operation	Quảng Ngãi Province	206	11
Apr 15 – 17	Operation Bolivar	3rd Brigade, 1st Infantry Division road clearing operation from Lai Khe to Phu Cuong			
Apr 15 – 20	Operation Miami	1st Brigade, 1st Infantry Division search and destroy operation	III Corps		
Apr 16 – 21	Operation Kahala	2nd Brigade, 25th Infantry Division search and destroy operation	Hậu Nghĩa Province	55	3
Apr 17 – 20	Operation Yell	1st Battalion, 1st Marines and 2nd Battalion, 1st Marines search and destroy operation	Quảng Nam Province		
Apr 17 – May 1	Operation Virginia	1st Battalion, 1st Marines search and destroy and reconnaissance in force operation	vicinity of Khe Sanh Special Forces camp, Quảng Trị Province		
Apr 17 – May 4	Operation Lexington	2nd Brigade, 1st Infantry Division saturation patrolling as a follow-up to Operation Jackstay	north of the Rung Sat Special Zone		
Apr 17 – Jun 9	Operation Lexington III	1st Battalion, 18th Infantry Regiment search and destroy operation	Rung Sat Special Zone, Biên Hòa Province		
Apr 18 – 20	Operation Otsego	1st Infantry Division search and destroy operation	Bình Dương Province		
Apr 20 – 21	Operation Bristol	US operation	III Corps		
Apr 20 – 22	Operation Omaha	2nd Brigade, 1st Infantry Division search and destroy and road clearing operation on Route 13	between Chơn Thành District and Lai Khe		
Apr 20 – May 10	Operation Georgia	1st Battalion, 4th Marines, 2nd Battalion, 4th Marines, 3rd Battalion, 4th Marines and 3rd Battalion, 9th Marines search and destroy operation around the An Hoa industrial complex and Nhong Son	Quảng Nam Province	103	8
Apr 21 – 25	Operation Dan Chi 219C	ARVN 21st Division operation	Chuong Thien Province	247	20
Apr 21 – May 3	Operation Mosby II	2/1 Cavalry reconnaissance in force and interdiction of VC movement west of Route 14	Kon Tum and Pleiku Provinces		
Apr 22 – 23	Operation Bowie	3rd Brigade, 1st Infantry Division and ARVN 5th Division search and destroy operation and saturation patrolling along Route 13	vicinity of Lai Khe		
Apr 22 – 23	Operation Chattanooga	1st Battalion, 26th Infantry Regiment search and destroy operation	III Corps		
Apr 22 – 24	Operation Hot Springs/Operation Lien Ket 36	3rd Battalion, 1st Marines, 2nd Battalion, 7th Marines, 3rd Battalion, 7th Marines and ARVN 5th Regiment, VNMC 1st Battalion and 5th Airborne Battalion operation	Quảng Ngãi Province	103	8
Apr 24 – May 17	Operation Birmingham	1st Infantry Division and ARVN 5th Division multi-brigade search and destroy operations on the eastern flank of War Zone C to open Route 13 from Saigon to the north and engage the Viet Cong 9th Division	Tây Ninh Province	119	56 US
Apr 26 – 28	Operation Bee Bee	3/1 Cavalry show of force operation	near Bong Son, Bình Định Province		
Apr 26 – 30	Operation Wyoming	3rd Battalion, 1st Marines and 2nd Battalion, 5th Marines search and destroy operation	15 km northwest of Chu Lai, Quảng Tín Province		
Apr 27 – May 2	Operation Osage	SLF 1st Battalion, 5th Marines rice harvest security operation	Thừa Thiên Province		
Apr 27 – May 12	Operation Maili	2nd Brigade, 25th Infantry Division search and destroy operation	Hậu Nghĩa Province		
Apr 27 – May 12	Operation Maimi	1st Brigade, 1st Infantry Division road clearing operation	Tân Uyên District		
May	Operation Khung Long	ARVN operation	Bình Định Province	30	19
May	Operation Xay Dung 31	ARVN operation	Bình Long Province	33	29
May 1–18	Operation Austin IV	1st Brigade, 101st Airborne Division, 173rd Airborne Brigade and ARVN 45th Regiment operation	Quang Duc Province and Phước Long Province	101	9
May 2 – 12	Operation Lihue	2nd Brigade, 25th Infantry Division security operation on Route 22	between Cu Chi and Tây Ninh		
May 3 – 15	Operation Lewis and Clark	2/1 Cavalry reconnaissance in force operation	from Pleiku to An Khê		
May 4–6	Operation Dexter	173rd Airborne Brigade search and destroy operation	Phước Thành Province		
May 4–7	Operation Cherokee	1st Battalion, 1st Marines, 2nd Battalion, 4th Marines and 3rd Battalion, 4th Marines search and destroy operation	Thừa Thiên Province		
May 4–16	Operation Davy Crockett	3/1 Cavalry and ARVN 22nd Division search and destroy operation revisited the Operation Masher/White Wing area; the PAVN and VC offered resolute resistance, often entrenched or firing out of large, hardened clay anthills	near Bong Son in Bình Định Province	345	156
May 7–9	Operation Hollingsworth	1st Infantry Division four Battalion air assault on suspected VC headquarters	Tây Ninh Province		
May 9 – 14	Operation Montgomery/Operation Lien Ket 40	1st Battalion, 5th Marines, 1st Battalion, 7th Marines, 2nd Battalion, 7th Marines and VNMC 2nd & 5th Battalions security operation	Quảng Ngãi Province		
May 10 – 12	Operation Wayne	4th Marines search and destroy operation 10 km southwest of Phu Bai	Thừa Thiên Province		
May 10 – Jul 31	Operation Paul Revere/Operation Than Phong 14	3rd Brigade 25th Infantry Division, 1 Battalion from the 2/1 Cavalry, Troop B, 1st Squadron, 9th Cavalry Regiment, 2 ROKA Battalions and 2 ARVN Battalions border screening, area-control operation which thwarts a VC monsoon season offensive	Darlac and Pleiku Provinces	546	63 US, 16 ARVN
Aug 25 – Oct 18	Operation Paul Revere III	2nd Brigade, 4th Infantry Division, 2nd and 3rd Brigades 25th Infantry Division and 3/1 Cavalry operation	26 km west of Pleiku	46	3
May 12–13	Operation Asheville	4th Battalion, 9th Infantry Division search and destroy operation	III Corps		
May 14–16	Operation Dan Chi 227	ARVN operation	An Xuyen Province	247	1
May 15 – 17	Operation Yuma	3rd Battalion, 7th Marines search and destroy operation	Quảng Ngãi Province		
May 16	Operation Wahiawa	1st and 2nd Brigades, 25th Infantry Division search and destroy operation in the Bo Loi Woods, Ho Bo Woods and Filhol Plantation	Hậu Nghĩa Province	103	25
May 16 – Jun 5	Operation Crazy Horse/Operation Bun Kae 66-7	1st Cavalry Division, ROK Capital Division and ARVN operation	between Vĩnh Thạnh and Soui Ca Valleys of Bình Định Province	501	29
May 17	Operation Dan Chi 228B	ARVN operation	Bạc Liêu Province	267	6
May 17 – 21	Operation Providence	1st Brigade, 1st Infantry Division search and destroy and route security operation from Tân Uyên District to Phuoc Vinh			
May 19–26	Operation El Paso I	3rd Brigade, 1st Infantry Division search and destroy operation and reinforcement of Lộc Ninh Special Forces camp	Bình Long Province		
May 20 – 22	Operation Morgan	3rd Battalion, 7th Marines and 2nd Battalion, ARVN 4th Regiment search and destroy operation	Quảng Ngãi Province		
May 21 – 23	Operation Long Phi 971	ARVN operation	Kiên Giang Province	224	6
May 23 – Jun 25	Operation Athens	3rd Battalion 4th Marines search and operation	25 km south of Huế in Thừa Thiên Province		
May 24	Operation Cheyenne I	1st Battalion, 5th Marines search and destroy operation along the coast	20 km north of Chu Lai		
May 24 – Jun 4	Operation Hardihood	173rd Airborne Brigade and 1st Battalion, Royal Australian Regiment multi-battalion reconnaissance operation and the clearance of Nui Dat and the establishment of the 1st Australian Task Force base area	Vũng Tàu area, Phước Tuy Province	48	
May 25 – 28	Operation Mobile	17th Marines, ARVN 5th Regiment and VNMC 5th Battalion search and destroy operation	Quảng Ngãi Province		
May 27–28	Operation Chicago	US security operation	III Corps		
May 30	Operation Quyet Thang 296	ARVN operation	Quảng Tín Province	100	2
May 30 – Jun 6	Operation Reno I	2nd Brigade, 1st Infantry Division search and destroy operation	III Corps		
May 30 – Jun 8	Operation Reno	2nd Battalion, 4th Marines reconnaissance in force	vicinity of Dong Ha, Quảng Trị Province		
May 30 – Jun 9	Operation Adelaide I	1st Brigade, 1st Infantry Division search and destroy operation and security for repair of Route 16	III Corps		
May 31	Operation Cheyenne II	1st Battalion, 5th Marines search and destroy operation	I Corps		
May 31 – Jun 8	Operation Adelaide II	Search and destroy operation and cordon and search operation	Bình Dương Province		
Jun – Aug	Operation Enogerra	6th Battalion, Royal Australian Regiment search and clearance of Long Phouc village	Phước Tuy Province		
Jun 1 – 6	Operation Muskegon	3rd Brigade, 1st Infantry Division search and destroy operation	Bình Dương Province		
Jun 1 – 9	Operation Beaver II	USMC search and destroy operation	I Corps		
Jun 2 – 5	Operation Lam Son 11	1st Squadron, 4th Cavalry and 7th Company, 7th ARVN Regiment operation	Bình Dương Province		
Jun 2 – 21	Operation Hawthorne/Operation Dan Tang 61	1st and 2nd Battalions, 327th Airborne Infantry Regiment, 2nd Battalion 502nd Airborne Infantry Regiment, 1st Battalion, 5th Cavalry Regiment and ARVN 42nd Regiment and 21st Ranger Battalion operation	Kon Tum Province	688 plus further 506 estimated	48 US, 10 ARVN
Jun 2 – Jul 13	Operation El Paso II	2nd Battalion, 18th Infantry Regiment, 2nd Battalion, 28th Infantry Regiment, 1st Squadron, 4th Cavalry Regiment and ARVN 5th Division operation against Vietcong 9th Division on Route 13	near Minh Thanh in Bình Long Province	855	47
Jun 3 – Jul 3	Operation Fort Smith	1st Brigade, 25th Infantry Division search and destroy and pacification operations along Route 1	Hậu Nghĩa Province		
Jun 3 – 9	Operation Makiki	2nd Brigade, 25th Infantry Division and ARVN 49th Regiment search and destroy operation	Hậu Nghĩa Province		
Jun 6	Operation Muskegon (USMC)	2nd Battalion, 2nd Marines search and destroy operation	I Corps		
Jun 6 – 9	Operation Joliet	4th Battalion, 9th Infantry Regiment search and destroy operation	6 km east of Cu Chi, III Corps		
Jun 6 – 12	Operation Apache	2nd Battalion, 5th Marines search and destroy operation	Quảng Trị Province		
Jun 6 – 20	Operation Benning II	US security operation	II Corps		
Jun 7 – 9	Operation Adelaide III	Search and destroy operation and road clearing operation from Di An to Phước Vĩnh	Bình Dương Province		
Jun 7 – 12	Operation Thang Phong III	ARVN and CIDG operation	Pleiku Province	135	20
Jun 8 – 18	Operation Hollandia	173rd Airborne Brigade search and destroy operation	Long Hải peninsula, Phước Tuy Province		
Jun 9 – 12	Operation Florida	USMC search and destroy and operation	Thừa Thiên Province		
Jun 9 – 21	Operation Hooker I	2/1 Cavalry reconnaissance and security operation along the Cambodian border	western Kon Tum and Pleiku Provinces		
Jun 12 – 14	Operation Fargo I	1st Brigade, 25th Infantry Division search and destroy operation	Hậu Nghĩa Province		
Jun 13	Operation Mexicali	1st Battalion, 5th Infantry Regiment search and destroy operation	Hậu Nghĩa Province		
Jun 13 – Jul 4	Operation Santa Fe (1966)	1st Battalion, 27th Infantry Regiment search and destroy operation	Hậu Nghĩa Province		
Jun 16	Operation Longstreet	ROK 2nd Marine Brigade engineering security operation	Bình Định and Phú Yên Provinces		
Jun 17 – 21	Operation Helemano	4th Battalion, 9th Infantry Regiment search and destroy operation	Hậu Nghĩa Province		
Jun 17 – 23	Operation Dodge	2nd Battalion, 4th Marines search and destroy operation	Quảng Trị Province		
Jun 18 – 30	Operation Deckhouse I	BLT 3rd Battalion, 5th Marines operation in support of the 1st Cavalry Division's Operation Nathan Hale	Phú Yên Province	400	
Jun 19 – Jul 1	Operation Nathan Hale	1st Cavalry Division and 1st Brigade, 101st Airborne Division operation	vicinity of Dong Tre and Tuy Hòa, Phú Yên Province	459	62
Jun 21 – 24	Operation Lam Son 283	ARVN operation	Quảng Trị Province	331	37
Jun 23 – Jul 9	Operation Yorktown	173rd Airborne Brigade search and destroy operation	Xuân Lộc Province		
Jun 24 – Jul 15	Operation Beauregard	1st Brigade, 101st Airborne Division security operation of the Cambodian and Laotian borders	Kon Tum and Pleiku Provinces		
Jun 25 – Jul 1	Operation Coco Palms	1st Battalion, 5th Infantry Regiment search and destroy operation	northwest of Cu Chi in Bình Dương Province	25	
Jun 25 – Jul 2	Operation Jay/Operation Lam Son 284	2nd Battalion, 1st Marines, 2nd Battalion, 4th Marines and ARVN operation to engage the PAVN 806th and 812th Battalions, 6th Regiment that had recently moved into the Quảng Điền District between Route 1 and the South China Sea about 20 km north of Huế	Thừa Thiên Province	54	6
Jun 27 – Dec 1 68	Operation Boone	MACV operation to develop a cross-border reconnaissance capability for Cambodia using Special Forces troops	Cambodia		
Jun 29 – Jul 1	Operation Oakland/Operation Lien Ket 46	2nd Battalion, 7th Marines, 3rd Battalion, 11th Marines, 2nd Battalion, ARVN 5th Regiment ARVN 37th Ranger Battalion search and destroy operation	Quảng Ngãi Province		
Jun 30 – Jul 31	Operation Benning III	2/1 Cavalry security operation	Bình Định Province		
Jul 1 – 6	Operation Holt/Operation Lam Son 286	3rd Battalion, 4th Marines and ARVN search and destroy operation	Thừa Thiên Province		
Jul 2 – 30	Operation Henry Clay	1st Cavalry Division and 2nd Battalion, 327th Airborne Infantry Regiment search and destroy operation in the Cambodian border area as a follow-up to Operation Nathan Hale	Bình Định, Phu Bon, Phú Yên, Pleiku and Darlac Provinces		
Jul 2 – 31	Operation Kahana	25th Infantry Division search and destroy operation	Bình Tuy and Long Khánh Provinces		
Jul 4	Operation James Bond	2/1 Cavalry counterintelligence operation	Bình Định Province		
Jul 4 – 14	Operation Sydney I	5th Battalion, Royal Australian Regiment search and destroy operation	Phước Tuy Province		
Jul 4 – Oct 27	Operation Macon	1st Battalion, 3rd Marines, 2nd Battalion, 3rd Marines, 3rd Battalion, 3rd Marines, 1st Battalion, 9th Marines, 2nd Battalion, 9th Marines and 3rd Battalion, 9th Marines search and destroy and security operation for the An Hoa industrial complex	Quảng Nam Province	507	24
Jul 5	Operation Cuu Long 32/66	ARVN operation	Kien Hoa Province	155	4
Jul 5 – 11	Operation Binh Phu	ARVN operation	Bình Định Province	137	15
Jul 6 – 14	Operation Washington	1st Reconnaissance Battalion reconnaissance operation in the Do Xa region	Quảng Ngãi Province	13	
Jul 6 – 26	Operation Springfield	1st Battalion, 2nd Infantry Regiment search and destroy operation	III Corps		
Jul 7 – Aug 3	Operation Hastings/Operation Deckhouse II	1st Battalion, 3rd Marines, 2nd Battalion, 4th Marines, 3rd Battalion 4th Marines, 3rd Battalion, 5th Marines, 3rd Battalion, 9th Marines, 3rd Battalion, 12th Marines, 1st Battalion, 1st Marines and 2nd Battalion, 1st Marines and ARVN operation against the PAVN 324B Division	Cam Lo area near the DMZ	882	183
Jul 8 – 12	Operation Thăng Long 243	ARVN operation	Darlac Province	107	17
Jul 8 – 13	Operation Ewa	1st Battalion, 27th Infantry Regiment search and destroy operation	Hậu Nghĩa Province		
Jul 9 – 17	Operation Aurora I	173rd Airborne Brigade search and destroy operation	Long Khánh Province		
Jul 9 – Aug	Operation Bun Kae 66-9	ROK Capital Division operation	Pleiku Province	106	7
Jul 12 – Sep 3	Operation El Paso III	1st Brigade, 1st Infantry Division search and destroy operation	Binh Long and Phước Long Provinces		
Jul 13 – 15	Operation Fresno (Hậu Nghĩa)	2nd Battalion, 27th Infantry Regiment search and destroy operation	Hậu Nghĩa Province		
Jul 13 – 22	Operation Kansas	III MAF operation which involved inserting a series of 13-man reconnaissance teams to observe and bring fire on the NVA and VC	Que Son Valley, Quang Tin and Quảng Nam Provinces	85	9
Jul 14 – 22	Operation Mokuliea	2nd Brigade, 25th Infantry Division search and destroy operation	Bình Dương and Hậu Nghĩa Provinces		
Jul 15 – 23	Operation Sydney II	5th Battalion, Royal Australian Regiment search and destroy operation	Phước Tuy Province		
Jul 16	Operation Deckhouse II	3rd Battalion, 5th Marines and HMM-363 operation in support of Operation Hastings	northeast of Dong Ha in Quảng Trị Province		
Jul 16 – 18	Operation Brisbane	6th Battalion, Royal Australian Regiment operation	Phước Tuy Province		
Jul 17	Operation Lam Son 290	ARVN operation	Quảng Trị Province	135	
Jul 17 – 22	Operation Cedar Rapids I	1st Battalion, 2nd Infantry Regiment and 1st Battalion, 26th Infantry Regiment search and destroy operation	Bình Dương Province		
Jul 17 – Aug 1	Operation Hayes	3/1 Cavalry reconnaissance and screening mission along the Cambodian border west of Dak To and Dak Pek including surveillance of known and suspected infiltration routes	Kon Tum Province		
Jul 17 – Aug 3	Operation Aurora II	173rd Airborne Brigade search and destroy operation	Phuong Lam Province		
Jul 21 – Sep 4	Operation John Paul Jones	2nd Brigade, 4th Infantry Division, 1st Brigade, 101st Airborne Division and ROK 2nd Marine Brigade operation	40 km west of Tuy Hòa, Phú Yên Province	158	12
Jul 20	Operation Tally Ho	Air and naval gunfire interdiction of lines of communication	southern panhandle of North Vietnam		
Jul 22 – 24	Operation Cedar Rapids II	1st and 2nd Battalions, 2nd Infantry Regiment search and destroy operation	Bình Dương Province		
Jul 23 – Aug 6	Operation Koko Head	2nd Brigade, 25th Infantry Division search and destroy operation	Bình Dương and Hậu Nghĩa Provinces	6	
Jul 24 – 29	Operation Hobart	6th Battalion, Royal Australian Regiment search and destroy operation			
Jul 25	Operation Steel Horse VII	6th Battalion, 16th Field Artillery harassment and interdiction operation	Bình Định Province		
Jul 26 – 29	Operation Franklin/Operation Lien Ket 50	1st Battalion, 7th Marines, 2nd Battalion, 7th Marines and ARVN 2nd Division search and destroy operation	Quảng Ngãi Province		
Jul 26 – Aug 1	Operation Springfield II	1st Battalion, 2nd Infantry Regiment search and destroy operation	III Corps		
Jul 31 – Sep 2	Operation Benning IV	1/1 Cavalry security operation	Bình Định Province		
Aug – Sep	Operation Blue Jay	II Field Force operation to support the deployment of the 196th Infantry Brigade to its base in Tây Ninh; the 25th Infantry Division was the sponsor, along with direct air force airlift from the port of Vũng Tàu to Tây Ninh, along with road convoys			
Jul 31 – Aug 25	Operation Paul Revere II	3rd Brigade 25th Infantry Division, 2/1 Cavalry, 3/1 Cavalry, ROKA, ARVN 23rd Division and ARVN 3rd Airborne Brigade search and clear operation	Pleiku Province	620	68
Aug 1 – 31	Operation Oahu	1st Brigade, 25th Infantry Division search and destroy operation	Tây Ninh Province		
Aug 2 – 8	Operation Bucks	3rd Battalion, 1st Marines search and destroy operation 15 km south of Da Nang	Quảng Nam Province		
Aug 2 – 14	Operation Cheyenne (III Corps)	2nd and 3rd Brigades, 1st Infantry Division road clearing and security operation along Route 13	between Lai Khe and An Loc		
Aug 3 – Jan 31 1967	Operation Prairie	1st Battalion, 3rd Marines, 2nd Battalion, 3rd Marines, 3rd Battalion, 3rd Marines, 1st Battalion, 4th Marines, 2nd Battalion, 4th Marines, 3rd Battalion, 4th Marines, 2nd Battalion, 5th Marines, 2nd Battalion, 7th Marines, 3rd Battalion, 7th Marines, 2nd Battalion, 9th Marines and 1st and 3rd Battalions, 26th Marines search and destroy operation against the PAVN 324B Division in the hills at Con Thien/Gio Linh areas south of the DMZ at Mutter's Ridge, the Razorback, Hill 400, Hill 484 and The Rockpile	DMZ	1397	200
Aug 4 – 30	Operation Seamont	26th Marines search and destroy operation	Phú Quốc Island		
Aug 6 – 21	Operation Colorado/Operation Lien Ket 52	1st Battalion, 5th Marines, 2nd Battalion, 5th Marines and 3rd Battalion, 5th Marines, 1st, 3rd and 4th Battalions Republic of Vietnam Marine Corps and ARVN 35th and 39th Ranger Battalions search and destroy operation to locate and destroy the PAVN 2nd Division (AKA 620th Division)	Que Son Valley, Quảng Nam and Quảng Tín Provinces	674	22
Aug 7 – 18	Operation Holsworthy	5th Battalion, Royal Australian Regiment operation to reclaim the village of Binh Ba	Phước Tuy Province		
Aug 7 – Sep 1	Operation Lahaina	2nd Battalion, 27th Infantry Regiment pacification operation	Hậu Nghĩa Province		
Aug 8 – Sep 1	Operation Aiea	2nd Brigade, 25th Infantry Division search and destroy operation	Hậu Nghĩa Province		
Aug 10 – 12	Operation Wilcox	1st Battalion, 9th Marines search and destroy operation	Quảng Nam Province		
Aug 9 – Sep 7	Operation Toledo	173rd Airborne Brigade, 2nd Battalion, 18th Infantry Regiment, BLT 1st Battalion, 26th Marines, 1st Australian Task Force and ARVN 33rd and 35th Ranger Battalions multi-battalion search and destroy operation in the May Tao Secret Zone. The deserted headquarters area for the VC 5th Division was located and destroyed along with vast amounts of supplies	Long Khánh, Bình Tuy and Phước Tuy Provinces	11	
Aug 10 – Oct 10	Operation Stable	1st Logistical Command movement of the ROK 9th Division from Nha Trang to Tuy Hòa			
Aug 11 – Apr 1967	Operation Pink Rose	ARPA, US Forest Service and USAF operational testing of techniques to dry out and start forest fires	Tây Ninh and Phước Long Provinces		
Aug 12 – 14	Operation El Dorado	1st Brigade, 1st Infantry Division search and destroy operation	Bình Định Province		
Aug 13 – 21	Operation Suwannee	1st Battalion, 9th Marines and 3rd Battalion, 9th Marines search and destroy operation	Quảng Nam Province		
Aug 15 – 17	Operation Belfast	1st Infantry Division search and destroy operation	Bình Dương Province		
Aug 15 – 19	Operation Gallup	US search and destroy operation	III Corps		
Aug 16 – 18	Operation Smithfield	6th Battalion, Royal Australian Regiment operation in response to VC mortar fire developed into a battle against the VC 275th Regiment	Long Tan	245	18
Aug 16 – 29	Operation Deckhouse III	SLF 1st Battalion, 26th Marines and the 173rd Airborne Brigade joint operation	Vũng Tàu peninsula, Bình Tuy Province	2	4
Aug 18 – 20	Operation Broome	US search and destroy operation	III Corps		
Aug 18 – 20	Operation Brown	1st Battalion, 1st Marines, 2nd Battalion, 1st Marines and ARVN 51st Regiment search and destroy operation	Quảng Nam Province		
Aug 18 – 20	Operation Quang Dien	ARVN search and clear operation	Thừa Thiên Province	100	21
Aug 19 – 22	Operation Castine	2nd Brigade, 1st Infantry Division search and destroy operation	Bình Dương Province		
Aug 20 – 22	Operation Ottawa	3rd Battalion, 4th Marines search and destroy operation	Thừa Thiên Province		
Aug 20 – 29	Operation Allegheny	3rd Marines search and destroy operation	22 km southwest of Da Nang in Quảng Nam Province	113	7
Aug 23 – Sep 2	Operation Amarillo	1st Brigade, 1st Infantry Division mine-clearing operation	Phu Loi area of Bình Dương Province		
Aug 23 – Sep 23	Operation Pole Star	ROK 2nd Marine Brigade clear and search operation	Bình Sơn District, Quảng Ngãi Province		
Aug 23 – Sep 26	Operation Mallard II	Deployment of 2nd Battalion, 34th Armored Regiment from Vũng Tàu to Long Binh			
Aug 25 – 27	Operation Long Phi 984	ARVN search and destroy operation	Kiên Giang Province	132	30
Aug 26 – 31	Operation Darlinghurst	5th Battalion, Royal Australian Regiment clearing operation following 6 RAR's action at Long Tan	Phước Tuy Province		
Aug 26 – Sep 6	Operation Pawnee	3rd Battalion, 4th Marines search and destroy operation	Thừa Thiên Province		
Aug 26 – Jan 20 68	Operation Byrd	1st Cavalry Division economy-of-force operation	Bình Thuận Province		
Aug 27 – 29	Operation Jackson/Operation Lien Ket 54	3rd Battalion, 5th Marines, 3rd Battalion, 7th Marines and ARVN 4th Regiment search and destroy operation	Quảng Ngãi Province		
Aug 31 – Sep 12	Operation Kipapa	1st Brigade, 25th Infantry Division operation	Filhol Plantation, Hậu Nghĩa Province	8	6
Sep 1 – 4	Operation Troy	2nd Battalion, 1st Marines search and destroy operation	Quảng Nam Province		
Sep 1 – Oct 11	Operation Sunset Beach	2nd Brigade, 25th Infantry Division search and destroy operation	Hậu Nghĩa Province		
Sep 1-Nov 1	Operation Duke	84th Engineer Battalion (Construction), 19th Engineer Battalion (Combat), 509th Engineer Company (Panel Bridge), 553rd Engineer Company (Floating Bridge), 554th Engineer Company (Floating Bridge), 513th Engineer Company (Dump Truck), 585th Engineer Company (Dump Truck), 630th Engineer Company (Light Equipment)	Binh Dinh Province		
Sep 2 – 6	Operation Dan Chi 261	ARVN operation	An Xuyen and Bạc Liêu Provinces		21
Sep 2 – 29	Operation Benning V	3/1 Cavalry security operation	Bình Định Province		
Sep 3	Operation Decatur	1st Battalion, 26th Infantry Regiment security operation	Quon Loi – An Loc		
Sep 4 – 6	Operation Cranston	1st Battalion, 16th Infantry Regiment security and resupply operation	between Lai Khe and Phu Loi	52	2
Sep 4 – 15	Operation El Paso	1st Battalion, 5th Marines, 2nd Battalion, 5th Marines and ARVN 2nd, 3rd and 4th Battalions, 6th Regiment search and destroy operation	Quảng Tín Province		
Sep 4 – 15	Operation Napa/Operation Lien Ket 56	1st Battalion, 5th Marines, 3rd Battalion, 5th Marines and 2nd, 3rd, 4th Battalions, ARVN 6th Regiment search and destroy operation	Quảng Tín Province		
Sep 4 – Oct 8	Operation Baton Rouge	1st Battalion 18th Infantry search and destroy operation	Rung Sat Special Zone		
Sep 4 – Oct 25	Operation Seward	1st Brigade, 101st Airborne Division and 1st Battalion, 22nd Infantry Regiment search and destroy and security operation	Phú Yên Province	347	27
Sep 5 – 29	Operation Meadowlark	Deployment of 11th Armored Cavalry Regiment from Vũng Tàu to Long Binh			
Sep 6 – 9	Operation Manh Ho	ARVN operation	Bình Định Province	147	
Sep 6 – 12	Operation Bangor	2nd Battalion, 26th Infantry Regiment search and destroy operation	Bình Dương Province		
Sep 7 – 12	Operation Cannon	2nd Battalion, 1st Marines and 3rd Battalion, 9th Marines search and destroy operation	Quảng Nam Province		
Sep 8	Operation Seaside	3rd Battalion, 1st Marines search and destroy operation	Quảng Nam Province		
Sep 8 – 9	Operation Wilton	US search and destroy operation	III Corps		
Sep 8 – 14	Operation Pawnee II	3rd Battalion, 4th Marines search and destroy operation	Thừa Thiên Province		
Sep 8 – 16	Operation Fresno (Quảng Ngãi)	1st Battalion, 7th Marines search and destroy operation	Quảng Ngãi Province		
Sep 8 – 24	Operation Vaucluse	5th Battalion, Royal Australian Regiment and 6th Battalion, Royal Australian Regiment search and destroy operation	Phước Tuy Province		
Sep 13 – 22	Operation Atlantic City	3rd Brigade, 1st Infantry Division, 25th Infantry Division and 173rd Airborne Brigade search and destroy operation	Bình Dương Province		
Sep 13 – Oct 2	Operation Oliver Wendell Holmes	1/1/ Cavalry, 2/1 Cavalry and ARVN 3rd Airborne Brigade search and destroy operation			
Sep 13 – Oct 30	Operation Thayer I	1st Cavalry Division, ARVN 3rd Airborne Battalion and ARVN 41st Regiment operation	Bình Định Province	232	30
Sep 14 – Nov 25	Operation Attleboro	196th Infantry Brigade, 1st Infantry Division and 4th Infantry Division and 173rd Airborne Brigade operation	War Zone "C" of Tây Ninh Province	1,062	115
Sep 14 – Feb 13 1967	Operation Lanikai	1st Brigade, 25th Infantry Division pacification operation	Long An Province		
Sep 15 – 21	Operation Danbury	1st Battalion, 16th Infantry Regiment and 2nd Battalion, 28th Infantry Regiment search and destroy operation	10 km west of Lai Khe, III Corps		
Sep 15 – 24	Operation Deckhouse IV	SLF 1st Battalion, 26th Marines and 3rd Marine Reconnaissance Battalion operation as an adjunct to Operation Prairie	12 km northeast of Dong Ha in I Corps	200	36
Sep 15 – Oct 9	Operation Sioux City	173rd Airborne Brigade Combat Team search and destroy operation	Xom Cat, Biên Hòa Province		
Sep 15 – Nov 14	Operation Kalihi	1st Brigade, 25th Infantry Division operation	Filhol Plantation in Hậu Nghĩa Province	4	
Sep 16 – 27	Operation Golden Fleece 7-1/Operation Lien Ket 60	1st Battalion, 7th Marines and ARVN 4th Regiment operation to protect rice harvest	Mộ Đức District		
Sep 16 – Oct 19	Operation Wren	Deployment of the Philippine Civil Action Group from Cam Ranh Bay to Tây Ninh Province			
Sep 19 – Oct 4	Operation Kamuela	1st Brigade, 25th Infantry Division search and destroy operation	Boi Loi Woods and Ben Cui Plantation, Bình Dương Province	13	5
Sep 20 – 22	Operation Huntsville	3rd Brigade, 1st Infantry Division and ARVN 48th Regiment search and destroy operation	III Corps		
Sep 22 – 28	Operation Binh Phu 27	ARVN operation	Bình Định Province		
Sep 23 – Oct 1	Operation Longview	1st Brigade, 1st Infantry Division route security and clearing operation on Route 16	between Phuoc Vinh and Biên Hòa		
Sep 23 – Oct 30	Operation Mang Ho VI	ROKA Capital Division search and destroy operation	Bình Định Province	1161	30
Sep 24	Operation Coffee	2nd Battalion, 1st Marines search and destroy operation	Quảng Nam Province		
Sep 25	Operation Boyd	2nd Battalion, 28th Infantry search and destroy operation	Bình Dương Province		
Sep 28 – 29	Operation Monterey	1st Battalion, 5th Marines and 2nd Battalion, 5th Marines search and destroy operation	Quảng Tín Province		
Sep 28 – 30	Operation Kathy	ARVN 2nd and 8th Airborne Battalions search and destroy operation	Capital Military District		
Sep 29 – Oct 11	Operation Benning VI	2/1 Cavalry security operation	Bình Định Province		
Sep 30 – Oct 3	Operation Crowsnest	5th Battalion, Royal Australian Regiment operation for the assistance for the village of Duc Thanh	Phước Tuy Province		
Sep 30 – Oct 2	Operation Monterey II	1st Battalion, 5th Marines and 2nd Battalion, 5th Marines security operation	Quảng Tín Province		
Oct	Operation Traffic Cop	Initial phase of Operation Sea Dragon			
Oct 1	Operation Dazzlem (1966)	1st Cavalry Division and 173rd Airborne Brigade security operation	Bình Định Province		
Oct 1 – 4	Operation Little Rock	1st Brigade, 1st Infantry Division and ARVN 48th Regiment search and destroy operation	Phước Long Province		
Oct 1 – 25	Operation Kern	2nd Battalion, 3rd Marines search and destroy operation	Quảng Ngãi Province		
Oct 2 – 24	Operation Irving/Operation Dai Bang 800/Operation Mang Ho 6	1st Cavalry Division, ROK Capital Division and ARVN 22nd Division operation against the PAVN 610th Division	Bình Định Province	681	29
Oct 2 – 27	Operation Bathurst	5th Battalion, Royal Australian Regiment and 6th Battalion, Royal Australian Regiment search and destroy operation	Phước Tuy Province		
Oct 3 – 10	Operation Decatur II	1st Infantry Division security operation	III Corps		
Oct 3 – 10	Operation Lee/Operation Lien Ket 64	ROK 2nd Marine Brigade and ARVN 4th Regiment operation	Quảng Ngãi Province		
Oct 3 – Nov 20	Operation Lam Son 318	ARVN operation	Quảng Trị Province	179	38 ARVN, 1 US
Oct 6 – 10	Operation Canberra	5th Battalion, Royal Australian Regiment search and destroy operation, reinforced with an APC squadron, to assist in securing Route 15 in the 1st Australian Task Force TAOR in support of the receipt and initial positioning of the 3rd Brigade, 4th Infantry Division at Bear Cat			
Oct 6 – 15	Operation Hickory (Biên Hòa)	3rd Squadron, 11th Armored Cavalry Regiment search and destroy operations	Biên Hòa Province		
Oct 8 – 15	Operation Kent	2nd Battalion, 7th Marines search and destroy operation	Quảng Ngãi Province		
Oct 8 – 16	Operation Tulsa	1st Infantry Division and 5th Division road clearing operation along Route 13 between Phu Cuong and An Lộc	Bình Dương and Bình Long Provinces		
Oct 8 – Dec 4	Operation Winchester	4th Battalion, 503rd Airborne Infantry Regiment search and destroy operation to relieve the 2nd Battalion, 26th Marines and to occupy and maintain control of an assigned sector of the Da Nang TAOR	Da Nang		
Oct 11 – 16	Operation Robin	5th Battalion, Royal Australian Regiment and 173rd Airborne Brigade operation to receive the 3d Brigade, 4th Infantry Division at the ports of Saigon and Vũng Tàu, and to safeguard the transport to, and initial occupation of, the designated brigade base camp at Ben Cat in Bình Dương Province. A full examination of the area was cut short as 5RAR was required for road security on Route 15 while the 196th Infantry Brigade moved from Vũng Tàu to Long Binh			
Oct 11 – 20	Operation Teton	3rd Battalion, 1st Marines search and destroy operation	Quảng Nam Province		
Oct 11 – Nov 14	Operation Kailua	2nd Brigade, 25th Infantry Division operation	Hậu Nghĩa Province	67	5
Oct 11 – Nov 17 1967	Operation Uniontown (1966-67)	173d Airborne Brigade, 199th Light Infantry Brigade and 11th Armored Cavalry Regiment security and defence operations	around Long Binh		
Oct 16	Operation Cuu Long 22/KT	ARVN operation	Dinh Tuong Province	14	
Oct 16 – 17	Operation Craddock	US search and destroy operation	III Corps		
Oct 16 – Dec 3	Operation Leeds	3rd Brigade, 1st Infantry Division search and destroy operation			
Oct 17 – 26	Operation Queanbeyan	5th Battalion, Royal Australian Regiment search and destroy operation in AO Gold, a 14 square km area including Nui Thi Vai and the region north and west of it	Phước Tuy Province		
Oct 18 – 20	Operation Dan Chi 263	ARVN operation	Chuong Tien Province	138	29 ARVN, 1 US
Oct 18 – 30	Operation Dover	1st Battalion, 5th Marines search and destroy operation	Quảng Tín Province		
Oct 18 – Dec 31	Operation Paul Revere IV	2nd Brigade, 4th Infantry Division, 2nd and 3rd Brigades, 25th Infantry Division and 2/1 Cavalry search and destroy operation along the Cambodian border	western II Corps	962	136
Oct 18 – Feb 1 1967	Operation Duck	9th Infantry Division movement from Vũng Tàu to Bear Cat			
Oct 19 – Dec	Operation Atlanta	11th Armored Cavalry Regiment mission to clear and secure lines of communication in three provinces near Saigon and to secure the new Blackhorse Base Camp	13 km south of Xuan Loc	131	8
Oct 20 – 24	Operation Bethlehem	2nd Brigade, 1st Infantry Division search and destroy operation	Bình Dương Province		
Oct 21 – 23	Operation Madison	3rd Battalion, 1st Marines search and destroy operation	Quảng Nam Province		
Oct 21 – Nov 5	Operation Allentown/Lam Son II South	2nd Brigade, 1st Infantry Division search and destroy operation	Biên Hòa, Bình Dương and Gia Định Provinces		
Oct 25 – Nov 28	Operation Bremerton	3rd Battalion, 22nd Infantry Regiment search and destroy operation	Rung Sat Special Zone		
Oct 30 – Dec 4	Operation Geronimo	Company C, 1st Battalion, 327th Infantry Regiment, 1st Brigade, 101st Airborne Division search operation	Phú Hiệp	118	15
Oct 24 – Feb 11 1967	Operation Thayer II	1st Cavalry Division, 25th Infantry Division and Republic of Vietnam Marine Corps operation in the coastal plains and the Kim Son and Soui Ca Valleys	western Bình Định Province	1,667	193
Oct 25 – Apr 2 1967	Operation Adams	1st Brigade, 4th Infantry Division, 1st Brigade, 101st Airborne Division and ARVN 47th Regiment operation to protect rice harvest	Phú Yên Province	491	51
Oct 25 – Oct 31 1968	Operation Sea Dragon	US Navy and Royal Australian Navy interdiction of sea lines of communication and supply from North Vietnam to South Vietnam			5
Oct 29 – Dec 24	Operation Pawnee III	2nd Battalion, 26th Marines search and destroy operation	Thừa Thiên Province		
Oct 30 – 31	Operation Bundaberg	5th Battalion, Royal Australian Regiment and 6th Battalion, Royal Australian Regiment cordon and search operation	near Hoa Long in Phước Tuy Province		
Oct 31	Operation Travis	2/1 Cavalry emergency deployment to support Operation Paul Revere IV			
Nov – Jan 1970	Operation Stable Door	US Navy defence of allied shipping against VC attacks			
Nov 5 – 8	Operation Lien Ket 68	ARVN search and destroy operation	Quảng Tín Province	109	64
Nov 5 – 19	Operation Shasta	2nd Battalion, 1st Marines, 2nd Battalion, 3rd Marines and 1st Battalion, 26th Marines search and destroy operation	Quảng Nam Province		
Nov 6 – 7	Operation Yass	5th Battalion, Royal Australian Regiment cordon and search of Phuoc Hoa village and the clearance of Long Sơn Island	Phước Tuy Province		
Nov 8 – 12	Operation Hayman	3rd Squadron SAS and 5th Battalion, Royal Australian Regiment operation as a search and clear mission to round up VC who had infiltrated the fishing village on Long Sơn Island	Long Sơn Island		
Nov 8 – 14	Operation Arcadia	1st Battalion 1st Marines and 3rd Battalion 1st Marines search and destroy operation	Quảng Nam Province		
Nov 9 – 27	Operation Dragon Eye	ROK 2nd Marine Brigade search and destroy operation	Quảng Ngãi Province	154	38 ROK, 4 US
Nov 16 – Jan 12 67	Operation Dan Tam 81	11th Armored Cavalry Regiment and ARVN 10th Division rice harvest security operation	Bình Tuy and Long Khánh Provinces		
Nov 18 – Dec 3	Operation Ingham	5th Battalion, Royal Australian Regiment and 6th Battalion, Royal Australian Regiment search and destroy operation	Xuyên Mộc District		
Nov 19 – 27	Operation Lien Ket 70	ARVN 2nd Division search and destroy operation	Quảng Ngãi Province	123	3
Nov 18 – May 14 67	Operation Fort Nisqually	3rd Brigade, 4th Infantry Division deployment from Bear Cat to Dầu Tiếng District and search and destroy operations	Bình Dương Province		
Nov 20 – 27	Operation Rio Blanco/Operation Lien Ket 70	1st Battalion, 7th Marines and ARVN search and destroy operation	Quảng Ngãi Province		
Nov 20 – 27	Operation Rio Grande/Operation Lien Ket 81	1st Battalion, 5th Marines, ROK 2nd Marine Brigade and ARVN 2nd Division search and destroy operation	Quảng Ngãi Province		
Nov 24 – Dec 2	Operation Waco	1st Battalion, 503rd Airborne Infantry Regiment search and destroy operation	Biên Hòa Province		
Nov 25 – Dec 9	Operation Bismark	1st Brigade, 1st Infantry Division search and destroy and road clearing operation along Route 16	between Phuoc Vinh and Dĩ An District		
Nov 27 – Dec 23	Operation Charleston	2nd Battalion, 18th Infantry Regiment search and destroy operation	Rung Sat Special Zone		
Nov 29 – Dec 5	Operation Healdsburg	3rd Brigade, 1st Infantry Division search and destroy operation	III Corps	113	
Nov 29 – Dec 7	Operation Mississippi	2nd Battalion, 5th Marines search and destroy operation	Quảng Nam Province		
Nov 30 – Dec 6	Operation Sutter	1st Battalion, 5th Marines search and destroy operation	Quảng Tín Province		
Nov 30 – Dec 14 67	Operation Fairfax/Operation Rang Dong	1 Battalion from each of the 1st Infantry Division, 4th Infantry Division, 25th Infantry Division, 196th Infantry Brigade, ARVN 5th Division and ARVN Rangers operation	Saigon Capital Military District and Gia Định Province	1,043	179
Dec	Operation Boulder	1st Battalion, 26th Infantry Regiment search and destroy operation			
Dec 4 – 5	Operation Alexandria	11th Armored Cavalry Regiment operation	Duc Thanh Province and Xuân Lộc District		
Dec 4 – 14	Operation Canary	1st Australian Task Force and 173rd Airborne Brigade two phase highway security operation along Route 15 from Phú Mỹ to Long Binh and from Phú Mỹ to Bear Cat for elements of the 199th Light Infantry Brigade and the 9th Infantry Division			
Dec 6 – 7	Operation Trinidad	1st Battalion, 1st Marines search and destroy operation	Quảng Nam Province		
Dec 8 – Jan 19 1967	Operation Pickett	1st Brigade, 101st Airborne Division search and destroy operation	Kon Tum Province	62	20
Dec 7 – 11	Operation Trinidad II	1st Battalion, 1st Marines search and destroy operation	Quảng Nam Province		
Dec 7 – 12	Operation Cortez	3rd Battalion, 5th Marines search and destroy operation	Quảng Tín Province		
Dec 10 – Jan 12 67	Operation Blackjack 22	Special Forces Detachment B-50 Project OMEGA and Mobile Guerilla Force 768 operation	western Darlac Province		
Dec 11 – 16	Operation Sterling	3rd Battalion, 9th Marines search and destroy operation	Quảng Nam Province		
Dec 12 – Jan 21 1967	Operation Sierra	2nd Battalion, 7th Marines search and destroy operation	Quảng Ngãi Province		
Dec 16 – 26	Operation Initiator	199th Infantry Brigade search and destroy operation	Long Binh Province		
Dec 17 – 21	Operation Glenn	3rd Battalion, 1st Marines search and destroy operation	Quảng Nam Province		
Dec 19 – 21	Operation Shasta II	1st Battalion, 1st Marines search and destroy operation	Quảng Nam Province		
Dec 19 – 22	Operation Santa Cruz	1st Infantry Division cordon and search operation	Bình Dương Province		
Dec 20 – Feb 16 67	Operation Chinook I	4th Marines operation	Thừa Thiên Province	218	
Dec 24	Operation Little Sheba	1st Brigade, 1st Infantry Division route and convoy security operation	Biên Hòa Province		
Dec 27 – 30	Operation Dan Chi 270D	US and ARVN search and destroy operation	Chuong Tien Province	124	2 US
Dec 27 – 31	Operation Wiggins	2nd Battalion, 3rd Infantry Regiment search and destroy operation	Biên Hòa Province		

== See also ==
- List of allied military operations of the Vietnam War (1967)
