= List of allied military operations of the Vietnam War (1972) =

This article is a list of known military operations of the Vietnam War in 1972, conducted by the armed forces of the Republic of Vietnam, the Khmer Republic, the United States and their allies.

Date Duration	Operation Name	Unit(s) – Description	Location	VC–PAVN KIAs	Allied KIAs
72	Operation Prek Ta	FANK and ARVN operation against PAVN	Cambodia		
72	Operation Seahawk	US search and rescue operations in the Gulf of Tonkin, on the gun line off the coast, coming under enemy fire on 15 occasions	Gulf of Tonkin		
Feb 1 – Apr 30	Operation Keystone Owl	Redeployment of five infantry battalions, two cavalry squadrons and four air cavalry squadron from South Vietnam to the United States			
Apr 1 – Sep 16	Operation Eastertide (Quảng Trị)	ARVN 3rd Division reinforced by the 1st Division, VNMC and Airborne Division defense and counteroffensive against the PAVN 304th, 308th, 312th, 320th, 324B and 325th Divisions	Quảng Trị Province		
Apr 2 – Jul 11	Operation Eastertide (An Loc)	ARVN 5th Division, reinforced by TF 52 comprising the ARVN 18th Division, 21st Division, 35th Regiment and 1st Airborne Brigade defense and recapture of An Loc	An Loc		
Apr 5 – May 10	Operation Freedom Train	Initial US bombing campaign in response to the PAVN Easter Offensive, later superseded by Operation Linebacker			
Apr 12 – Jul 14	Operation Eastertide (Kon Tum)	ARVN 23rd Division, reinforced by the 40th, 41st, 42nd and 47th Regiments, 22nd Division defense of Kon Tum against the PAVN 2nd, 3rd and 320th Divisions	Kon Tum		
May 1 – Jun 30	Operation Keystone Pheasant	Redeployment of 3/1 Cavalry, 196th Infantry Brigade and four infantry Battalions from South Vietnam to the United States			
May 8	Operation Pocket Money	Mining of Haiphong Harbour by A-7 Corsair IIs and A-6 Intruders from the USS Coral Sea	Haiphong Harbour		
May 9 – Oct 23	Operation Linebacker I	U.S. Seventh Air Force and U.S. Navy Task Force 77 strategic bombing of Hanoi and Haiphong, and mining of Haiphong harbor to turn back the Easter Offensive	Hanoi and Haiphong		
May 17 – Oct	Operation Enhance	US resupply of military equipment and consumables to South Vietnam			
Jun 3 – 12	Operation Thunderhead	US Navy SEAL Team One and Underwater Demolition Team (UDT)-11 operation to rescue 2 escaped US POWs	Red River basin		1
Jul 1 – Aug 31	Operation Keystone Wren	Redeployment of two infantry battalions from South Vietnam to the United States			
Sep 1 – Nov 30	Operation Keystone Pelican	Redeployment of miscellaneous units from South Vietnam to the United States			
20 Oct – Dec	Operation Enhance Plus	Transfer of equipment and bases from U.S. to South Vietnam			
Dec 18 – 29	Operation Linebacker II	U.S. Seventh Air Force and U.S. Navy Task Force 77 strategic bombing of Hanoi and Haiphong, and mining of Haiphong harbor to force North Vietnam to return to the Paris Peace Talks	Hanoi and Haiphong	1612	

== See also ==
- List of allied military operations of the Vietnam War (1973–1974)
