= List of allied military operations of the Vietnam War (1964) =

This article is a list of known military operations of the Vietnam War in 1964, conducted by the armed forces of the Republic of Vietnam, the United States and their allies.

Date Duration	Operation Name	Unit(s) – Description	Location	VC–PAVN KIAs	Allied KIAs
64 – 65	Operation DeSoto I	US Navy and Republic of Vietnam Navy operation along the coast of North Vietnam to provoke coastal radar installations so electronic intelligence (ELINT) ships could record the resulting transmissions	South China Sea		
Jan 5	Unnamed	ARVN operation supported by U.S. aircraft to encircle a Viet Cong battalion	Long An province		
Jan 16-Feb 5	Operation Phuong Hoang I	ARVN 7th Division operation	Thạnh Phú district	85	19
Jan 18	Unnamed	115 helicopters carry 1,100 ARVN troops in the largest air assault of the war to date	north of Biên Hòa, Long Khánh province		
Feb 4-5	Operation Phuong Hoang II	ARVN 7th Division operation	Kien Hoa Province		
Feb 16-June	Operation Dan Chien I	ARVN 2nd Division pacification operation	Quang Tin Province		
Feb 17-June	Operation Dan Chien II	ARVN 2nd Division pacification operation	Quang Nam Province		
March	Operation Dragon	ARVN 9th Division night ambush operations		50	
Apr 12	Operation Chinh Nghia 29	ARVN 5th Division pacification operation	War Zone C	6	11
Apr 18	Operation Lam Son 115	ARVN 32nd Ranger Battalion and HMM-364 operation	A Shau Valley		
Apr 27 – May 25	Operation Quyet Thang 202	ARVN and HMM-364 air assault	Do Xa area, 46 km west of Quảng Ngãi, border of Quảng Ngãi and Kon Tum provinces	62	23
May 4	Operation Chuong Duong 10	ARVN operation	Pleiku province		
May 15 – Oct 1	Operation Leaping Lena	ARVN, CIDG and 5th Special Forces long-range patrolling to provide the groundwork for the formation of a combined American-South Vietnamese special reconnaissance unit capable of conducting the most hazardous and critical missions inside the country as required by MACV and the Vietnamese Joint General Staff. Renamed Project DELTA in October 1964	throughout South Vietnam		
May 19	Operation Yankee Team	USAF reconnaissance	Laos		
May 24	Unnamed	ARVN operation	Can Giao, Gia Định province		
May 29	Operation Dan Chi 132	ARVN operation	Chuong Thien		
May 30	Operation Chinh Nghia	ARVN operation	14 km southeast of Biên Hòa, Biên Hòa province		
May 31	Operation Quyet Thang 303	ARVN operation	40 km northeast of Toumorong, Kon Tum province		
Jun 2	Unnamed	ARVN operation	northwest of Phuoc Vinh, Tây Ninh province		
Jun 16 – Jul 12	Operation Quyet Thang 404	ARVN operation	Phú Yên province		
Jun 17	Operation 33-64	ARVN operation	Rung Sat Special Zone, Gia Định province		
Jul 9	Unnamed	ARVN operation	13 km southeast of Thủ Đức, Gia Định province		
Jul 10	Operation Chinh Nghia 36	ARVN operation	6 km south of Đức Hòa, Hậu Nghĩa province		
Jul 14–16	Operation Quang Ngai 16	ARVN operation	14 km west-southwest of Sơn Tịnh, Quảng Ngãi province		
Jul 23 - 30	Operation Le Loi 9	ARVN operation	24 km southwest of An Tức, Pleiku province		
Jul 23 - Aug 2	Operation Vi Dan 109	ARVN 23rd Division operation	Phú Yên province	51	1
Jul 26	Unnamed	ARVN operation	46 km east of Lac Thien, Darlac province		
Aug 2	Unnamed	ARVN operation	7 km west of Tuy An, Phú Yên province		
Aug 4	Unnamed	ARVN operation	17 km southeast of Gò Công		
Aug 5	Operation Pierce Arrow	US Navy airstrikes against North Vietnamese torpedo boat bases and POL facilities in response to the Gulf of Tonkin incident	Hon Gai, Loc Chao, Quảng Khê, Bến Thủy, and Vinh		1
Aug 11–17	Operation Chinh Nghia	ARVN assault on a Viet Cong base area	III Corps		
Aug 12	Unnamed	ARVN operation	30 km northeast of Le Trung, Pleiku province		
Aug 13	Operation Tu Cuong 124	ARVN operation	5 km east of Đức Phổ, Quảng Ngãi province		
Aug 15	Operation Dan Chi 54	ARVN operation	Thừa Thiên province		
Aug 17	Operation Quyet Thang 606	ARVN operation	43 km northwest of Cheo Reo, Phu Bon province		
Aug 19–22	Operation Lien Lu 7	ARVN operation	11 km north of Tây Ninh city		
Aug 20–29	Operation Quyet Thang 505	ARVN 25th Division operation	An Lao valley	55	6
Aug 20–31	Operation Thăng Long 18	ARVN operation	27 km northwest of Le Trung, Pleiku province		
Aug 27–29	Operation Bình Thuận 39	ARVN operation	11 km north of Muong Man, Bình Thuận province		
Sep 1 – mid 1965	Operation Hop Tap	ARVN operation in an effort to push government control outward from Saigon into the surrounding six provinces of. Forces included the ARVN 5th Division and the Airborne and Marine Brigades. Two regiments of the ARVN 25th Division provided local security along with Regional Forces and Popular Forces, National Police and hamlet militia	Gia Định, Biên Hòa, Bình Dương, Hậu Nghĩa, Long An, and Phước Tuy provinces		
Sep	Operation Lam Son 129	ARVN 1st Division operation	Triệu Phong district	75	1
Sep	Unnamed	ARVN 23rd Division operation	Phu Yen province	66	4
Oct 1 – Jun 30 1970	Operation Project Delta	Project DELTA operated country-wide under the direction of MACV as approved by the South Vietnamese Joint General Staff	throughout South Vietnam		
Oct 3-5	Operation Dan Chi	ARVN 2nd Battalion, 33rd Infantry operation	An Xuyen province	46	
Oct 17–19	Operation Dan Chi 80	ARVN operation	Ba Xuyen province	123	
Nov 8 - Dec 31	Unnamed	ARVN 23rd Ranger Battalion and 44th Infantry Regiment search and destroy operation	Phu Yen province	119	73
Nov 18-23	Operation Phong Hoa/Brushfire	ARVN 14 battalion operation against VC base areas	Bình Dương and Tây Ninh provinces	168	22
Dec 3	Operation Chinh Nghia 53	9th Infantry Regiment air assault operation	Tay Ninh province	4	
Dec 14 – Mar 29 1973	Operation Barrel Roll	The bombing of Laos by U.S. forces, to support the Royal Lao Army and CIA-trained Hmong	Laos		
Dec 27–29	Operation Dan Chi 100-50	ARVN operation against the VC 207th, 303rd, 306th, and U Minh I Battalions	15 km east of Sóc Trăng, Ba Xuyen province		

== See also ==
- List of allied military operations of the Vietnam War (1965)
