= List of allied military operations of the Vietnam War (1965) =

This article is a list of known military operations of the Vietnam War in 1965, conducted by the armed forces of the Republic of Vietnam, the United States and their allies.

Date duration	Operation name	Unit(s) – description	Location	VC–PAVN KIAs	Allied KIAs
1965–72	Operation Footboy	MACVSOG covert operations in North Vietnam and North Vietnamese waters for the purpose of collecting intelligence, conducting psychological warfare operations, and other activities to create dissension among the populace, and for diversion of North Vietnamese resources	North Vietnam		
Jan 5	Unnamed	Six-company CIDG and Special Forces A-114 and A-411 Detachments operation	Tây Ninh Province		
Jan 19-27	Operation Sherwood Forest	U.S. Air Force (USAF) defoliation operation	Boi Loi Woods		
Jan 21	Operation An Dan 70	ARVN 25th Division, 52nd Ranger Battalion and 22nd River Assault Group operation	Vaico Oriental River	73	33
Feb 7–24	Operation Flaming Dart	Phase I (February 7): USAF reprisal bombing attacks against PAVN units and military barracks near Đồng Hới and the Demilitarized Zone. Phase II (February 11): USAF and RVNAF strike the Chanh Hoa and Vit Thu Lu barracks, respectively, in North Vietnam.	Đồng Hới, Demilitarized Zone, Chanh Hoa and Vit Thu Lu		8
Feb 9-11	Operation 21/Nguyen Van Nho	ARVN 5th, 6th & 7th Airborne Battalions supported by the US 145th and 13th Aviation Battalions	24km northeast of Binh Gia	91	22 ARVN, 1 US
Mar 2 – Nov 1 1968	Operation Rolling Thunder	USAF, U.S. Navy and RVNAF sustained and escalating bombing campaign of North Vietnam to destroy military infrastructure, interdict supply routes and undermine the North's willingness to continue the war	North Vietnam	20,000 est.	835
Mar 11 – 1972	Operation Market Time	Combined U.S. Navy and South Vietnamese Navy effort to stop the flow of supplies from North Vietnam into South Vietnam	South China Sea		
Mar 21	Operation Tien Giang 10/65	ARVN 7th Division security operation	Kien Hoa Province	30	
Mar 25-27	Operation Quyet Thang 3	ARVN security operation	Phuoc Thanh province		
Mar 31-Apr 1	Operation Quyet Thang 512	ARVN 5th Airborne Battalion, MAG-16, HMM-163 and HMM-162 air assault	near Tam Ky 40 km south of Da Nang, Quảng Tín Province	70	21 ARVN, 2 US
Apr 3 – Nov 11 1968	Operation Steel Tiger (part of Operation Barrell Roll)	U.S. 2nd Air Division aerial interdiction effort targeted against the infiltration of PAVN men and material moving south from North Vietnam	southeastern Laos		
Apr 4 – 7	Operation Dan Chi 129	ARVN 21st Division operation	Kiên Lương district	278	16 ARVN, 6 US
Apr 28 – May 5	Operation Tien Giang 19/65	ARVN amphibious and airmobile assault on VC logistics area	Thạnh Phú district	220	7
May 31 – Jun 3	Unnamed	173rd Airborne Brigade Combat Team first brigade sized operation in Vietnam, a series of airmobile assaults	near Bien Hoa, Biên Hòa Province	7	
Jun 18 – Aug 15 1973	Operation Arc Light	B-52 Stratofortress bombing campaign against communist base areas	throughout South Vietnam		
Jun 27–30	Unnamed	173rd Airborne Brigade first major offensive action by launching an operation, along with ARVN airborne units and 1st Battalion, Royal Australian Regiment (1RAR)	War Zone D, Long Khánh Province		
Jul 6–9	Operation 17-65	173rd Airborne Brigade operation	Phước Thành Province		
Jul 6–10	Unnamed	173rd Airborne Brigade, 1RAR and ARVN 43rd Regiment operation involving multiple air assaults just north of the Đồng Nai River	War Zone D, Long Khánh Province		
Jul 8 – Aug 19	Operation Than Phong II	ARVN II Corps operation to reopen Route 19			349
Jul 28	Operation Lien Ket 4	2nd Battalion, 4th Marines, ARVN 51st Regiment and VNMC 3rd Battalion first combined land operation in the war			
Jul 28 – Aug 2	Operation 19-65	173rd Airborne Brigade and 1RAR operation to disrupt VC movement from the Rung Sat Special Zone into Phước Tuy Province	Phước Tuy Province		
Aug 2 -3	Operation Blast Out	1st Battalion, 3rd Marines and ARVN 4th Regiment first search and clear operation in Cam Ne village. The operation was filmed by a CBS news crew who showed the Marines setting fire to Vietnamese huts with their Zippo lighters	16 km southwest of Da Nang, Quảng Nam Province	7	
Aug 3	Operation Dan Thang 5	52nd Aviation Battalion operation to lift 1,150 troops in six lifts from Camp Holloway to Duc Co airfield during the Siege of Duc Co	Pleiku Province		
Aug 4–5	Operation Marble Mountain	USMC search and destroy operation	I Corps		
Aug 6–7	Operation Thunderbolt	4th Marines and ARVN 51st Regiment joint search and destroy operation against the 1st VC Regiment	south of the Tra Bong River		
Aug 7–11	Operation Frag Order 12-65	173rd Airborne Brigade and 1RAR search and destroy operation	Phước Thành Province		
Aug 7–11	Operation Frag Order 15-65	173rd Airborne Brigade] and 1RAR search and destroy operation	Biên Hòa Province		
Aug 10–11	Operation Binh Dinh	USMC search and destroy operation	II Corps		
Aug 10–21	Unnamed	1st Brigade, 101st Airborne Division operation	southwest of Nha Trang		
Aug 11 – Sep 8	Operation Barracuda	2nd Brigade, 1st Infantry Division, the newly arrived 1st Brigade, 101st Airborne Division and 1st Battalion, 18th Infantry search and destroy operation	19 km west of Nha Trang, Khánh Hòa Province	25	
Aug 12	Operation Midnight	3rd Marines search and destroy mission	Elephant Valley, about 16 km northwest of Da Nang, Quảng Nam Province	2	
Aug 16–17	Operation Anvil	Search and destroy operation	III Corps		
Aug 17–24	Operation Starlite/Operation Starlight	2nd Battalion 4th Marines, 3rd Battalion 4th Marines, 3rd Battalion 3rd Marines and 3rd Battalion 7th Marines operation	Van Tuong peninsula (south of Chu Lai), Quảng Trị Province	700	242
Aug 19–22	Operation Cutlass	1st Brigade, 101st Airborne Division and 5th Special Forces Group search and destroy operation	south of Nha Trang		
Aug 25 – Oct 1	Operation Highland	1st Brigade, 101st Airborne Division and 2nd Battalion, 7th Marines route security operation to open Route 19 between Qui Nhơn and An Khe for debarkation and deployment of the 1st Cavalry Division	Bình Định Province	692	21
Aug 25 – Sep 10	Operation Quin Thang 165	ARVN road clearing operation. 21st TASS FACs from Qui Nhơn directed fifty A-1E strikes, four F-100 strikes and one B-57 strike, against constant ground fire, ambushes and automatic weapons fire for sixteen days.			
Aug 28 – Sep 3	Operation Than Phong III	ARVN II Corps operation to open Route 21 to Ban Me Thuot from Nha Trang. One hundred and thirteen air strikes were conducted by the USAF, Navy and Marines.	Route 21		
Sep 1	Operation Talon	1st Brigade, 101st Airborne operation	An Khe Pass, Bình Định Province		
Sep 1	Unnamed	1st Battalion, 503rd Infantry and supporting elements operation	near Kon Tum, Kon Tum Province		
Sep 4	Operation Venture	1st Brigade, 101st Airborne operation	An Khe area, Bình Định Province		
Sep 5–7	Operation Stomp	2nd Battalion, 7th Marines search and destroy operation	Ky Son Mountains, 16 km north of Qui Nhơn, Bình Định Province	26	
Sep 6–9	Operation Tam Thang 118	ARVN II Corps operation	near Ban Me Thout		
Sep 7	Operation Bayonet	1st Brigade, 101st Airborne operation as part of Operation Highland	An Khe area, Bình Định Province		
Sep 7–10	Operation Piranha	BLT 1st Battalion, 7th Marines, 3rd Battalion, 3rd Marines and 3rd Battalion, 7th Marines and ARVN 2d Battalion, 4th Regiment and 3rd Vietnamese Marine Battalion operations on the Batangan Peninsula and An Ky Peninsula aimed at the remnants of the 1st VC Regiment and to counter seaborne infiltration	Batangan and An Ky Peninsulas	183	2 Marines, 5 ARVN
Sep 7 - Oct 8	Operation BIG RED	173rd Airborne Brigade, 1st Battalion, 1RAR, Search & Destroy Operation, in Ben Cat, Phuoc Vinh, Di An, Phu Loc			
Sep 9	Operation Cacti	1st Brigade, 101st Airborne operation as part of Operation Highland	An Khe area, Bình Định Province		
Sep 10	Operation Than Phong IV	ARVN II Corps operation	near Qui Nhơn		
Sep 10–11	Operation Cold Steel	US search and destroy operation	II Corps		
Sep 13–14	Operation Cactus	US search and destroy operation	II Corps		
Sep 14–28	Unnamed	173rd Airborne Brigade search and destroy operation	Ben Cat, Biên Hòa Province	46	
Sep 14–28	Operation 24-65	173rd Airborne Brigade and 1RAR search and destroy operation	Bình Dương Province		
Sep 18–22	Operation Gibraltar	1st Brigade, 101st Airborne Division, 1st Cavalry Division and ARVN operation	Qui Nhơn		
Sep 21 – 1968	Operation Shining Brass	A series of cross-border reconnaissance and intelligence operations conducted by mixed Special Forces and Montagnard teams to counter PAVN infiltration through Laos into South Vietnam, perform bomb damage assessment, and control airstrikes. Shining Brass was renamed Prairie Fire in 1968 and finally Phu Dung on 8 April 1971	eastern Laos		
Sep 22 – Oct 19	Operation Good Friend	2nd Battalion, 502nd Airborne Infantry Regiment relief of 1st Battalion, 18th Infantry Regiment at Cam Ranh Bay and securing the area for the arrival of the ROK 2nd Marine Brigade	Cam Ranh Bay		
Sep 26–27	Operation Hard Rock	USMC search and destroy operation	I Corps		
Sep 28 – Nov 13	Operation Sayonara	1st Brigade, 101st Airborne Division and 2nd Battalion, 7th Marines area and route security operation to cover the deployment of the ROK Capital Division	Qui Nhơn, Bình Định Province		
Sep 29 – Oct 25	Operation Red One	2nd Battalion, 18th Infantry Regiment search and destroy and area security operation	Biên Hòa Province		
Oct	Operation Phu Yen 7	ARVN rice harvest operation	near Tuy Hòa		
Oct	Operation Spread Out	2nd Battalion, 7th Marines search and destroy operation	Vân Canh Valley, Bình Định Province		
Oct 1	Operation Checkerboard I	2nd Battalion, 16th Infantry Regiment search and destroy operation	Bình Dương Province		
Oct 1–9	Operation Blue Bonnet	3/1 Cavalry security operation	Route 19, Bình Định Province		
Oct 1 – Nov 13	Operation Good Friend II	1st Brigade, 101st Airborne Division, 1st Cavalry Division, 2nd Battalion, 7th Marines and ARVN 22nd Division operation in the vicinity of Qui Nhơn to secure the area for the arrival of the ROK Capital Division	Qui Nhơn		
Oct 2–4	Operation Quick Draw	3rd Battalion, 7th Marines search and destroy operation	Quảng Ngãi Province		
Oct 4–6	Operation Xray I	173rd Airborne Brigade search and destroy operation	Biên Hòa Province		
Oct 4–25	Operation Hopscotch	2nd Brigade, 1st Infantry Division search and destroy and security operation	Biên Hòa and Bình Dương Provinces	12	
Oct 8–14	Operation Iron Triangle	1st and 2nd Battalion, 503rd Airborne Regiment and 1RAR search and destroy operation following one of the first B-52 strikes of the war	Iron Triangle, Bình Dương Province		8
Oct 9 – Nov 1	Operation Cobra	2/1 Cavalry security operation along Route 19	Bình Định Province		
Oct 10–14	Operation Concord	3/1 Cavalry search and destroy operation	Bình Định Province		
Oct 10–12	Operation Shiny Bayonet	1st Cavalry Division and Republic of Vietnam Marine Corps operation in the Saui Ca River to trap elements of the PAVN 325th Division	near An Khe, Bình Định Province		
Oct 10–31	Operation Happy Valley	1st Battalion, 5th Cavalry Regiment pacification operation	"Happy Valley" in Bình Định Province		
Oct 13	Operation Black Lion	2nd Battalion, 28th Infantry search and destroy operation	Bình Dương Province		
Oct 14	Operation Checkmate	2nd Battalion, 28th Infantry Regiment search and destroy operation	Bình Dương Province		
Oct 14–17	Operation Lonesome End	1/1 Cavalry route and area security operation	Bình Định Province		
Oct 15	Operation Flip Flop	1st Battalion, 16th Infantry Regiment search and destroy and security operation	Bình Dương Province		
Oct 16	Operation Depth	2nd Battalion, 28th Infantry Regiment search and destroy operation	Bình Dương Province		
Oct 16	Operation Fly Low	1st Battalion, 16th Infantry Regiment search and destroy operation	Bình Dương Province		
Oct 16 – Nov 1	Operation Settlement	2/1 Cavalry security operation on Route 19	Bình Định Province		
Oct 17	Operation Bushmaster Bravo	3rd Brigade, 1st Infantry Division search and destroy operation	Bình Dương Province		
Oct 18–19	Operation Triple Play	3rd Battalion, 3rd Marines search and destroy operation	Quảng Tín Province		
Oct 18–24	Operation Trail Blazer	3rd Reconnaissance Battalion reconnaissance operation	Quảng Nam Province		
Oct 18–24	Operation Trail Boss	2/1 Cavalry search and destroy operation			
Oct 19	Operation Hot Foot	2nd Battalion, 28th Infantry Regiment search and destroy operation	Bình Dương Province		
Oct 19	Operation Ranger I	1st Battalion, 16th Infantry Regiment search and destroy operation	Bình Dương Province		
Oct 20 – Nov 7	Operation Indian Scout	1/1 Cavalry security operation for the movement of the ROK Capital Division into its Tactical Area of Responsibility	Bình Định Province		
Oct 21–27	Operation New One	173rd Airborne Brigade clear and secure operation	Bình Dương Province		
Oct 21–29	Operation Dan Thang 21	11th Armored Cavalry Regiment operation	Pleiku Province	317	11
Oct 22–25	Operation Red Snapper	2nd Battalion, 3rd Marines and 3rd Battalion, 4th Marines and two ARVN Battalions, one ARVN Ranger Battalion, and four Regional Force/Popular Force companies operation	Phu Gia Peninsula 36 km north of Da Nang	7	
Oct 23–26	Operation 27-65	1RAR search and destroy operation	Biên Hòa Province		
Oct 23 – Nov 20	Operation Silver Bayonet	1st Cavalry Division and a large ARVN force combined operation to seek out and destroy the NVA 320th, 33rd, and 66th regiments concentrated in western Pleiku	Ia Drang Valley, Pleiku Province	1,771	240
Oct 24	Operation Revenger	1st Battalion, 6th Infantry Regiment search and destroy operation	Bình Dương Province		
Oct 24 – Nov 26	Operation All the Way	1/1 Cavalry operation	near Pleiku		
Oct 24 – Nov 26	Operation Long Reach	1/1 Cavalry (Operation All The Way), 2/1 Cavalry (Operation Silver Bayonet II) and 3/1 Cavalry (Operation Silver Bayonet I) search and destroy operation and relief of Plei Me CIDG camp	Pleiku Province		
Oct 26	Operation Big Horn	3rd Brigade, 1st Infantry Division search and destroy operation	Bình Dương Province		
Oct 27	Operation Drum Head	3rd Battalion, 7th Marines search and destroy operation	Quảng Ngãi Province		
Oct 28–29	Operation Triple Trouble	1st Battalion, 16th Infantry Regiment search and destroy operation	Bình Dương Province		
Oct 29–31	Operation Lien Ket 10	2nd Battalion, 4th Marines and 3rd Battalion, 6th Regiment ARVN 2nd Division operation against the VC Do Xa base area	20 km west of Chu Lai		
Nov 1	Operation Binder I	3rd Brigade, 1st Infantry Division search and destroy operation	Bình Dương Province		
Nov 1–2	Operation Quyet Thang 172	ARVN 22nd Division, 1st Aviation Battalion, 52nd Aviation Battalion, 119th Aviation and the Marine Helicopter Squadron from Qui Nhơn operation to secure the rice rich Tuy Hòa Valley	Phú Yên Province		
Nov 1–20	Operation Custer Flats	2nd Battalion, 18th Infantry Regiment search and destroy operation	Biên Hòa Province		
Nov 1 – Dec 8	Operation Viper I	2nd Battalion, 16th Infantry Regiment and 1st and 2nd Battalions, 18th Infantry Regiment search and destroy operation	Biên Hòa Province	18	
Nov 1 – Jan 17 1966	Operation Dagger One	2nd Battalion, 16th Infantry Regiment and 1st and 2nd Battalions, 18th Infantry Regiment search and destroy operation	Biên Hòa Province		
Nov 2	Operation Binder II	3rd Brigade, 1st Infantry Division search and destroy operation	Bình Dương Province		
Nov 3–5	Operation Black Ferret	1st Battalion, 7th Marines and 3rd Battalion, 7th Marines and ARVN 4th Regiment, 2nd Division search and destroy operation. Correspondent Dickey Chapelle was killed by a mine booby-trap on this operation.	16 km south of Chu Lai, Quảng Ngãi Province	2	1 Marine, 1 correspondent
Nov 3–8	Operation Copperhead	1st Battalion, 18th Infantry Regiment search and destroy operation	Biên Hòa and Long Khánh Provinces		
Nov 5–9	Operation Hump	173rd Airborne Brigade and 1RAR operation	northwest Biên Hòa Province	416	48 US, 2 Australian
Nov 7	Operation Binder III	3rd Brigade, 1st Infantry Division search and destroy operation	Bình Dương Province		
Nov 7–10	Operation Blue Marlin	BLT 2nd Battalion 7th Marines, 3rd Battalion 3rd Marines, VNMC amphibious operation	near Tam Ky, Quảng Tín Province	25	2
Nov 8	Operation Binder IV	3rd Brigade, 1st Infantry Division and 1st Battalion, 16th Infantry search and destroy operation	Bình Dương Province		
Nov 8–14	Operation Lightning	ROK 2nd Marine Brigade operation	Khánh Hòa Province		
Nov 10–13	Operation Hop Out	1st Battalion, 7th Cavalry Regiment search and destroy operation			
Nov 10–15	Operation Road Runner	3rd Brigade, 1st Infantry Division road clearing and security operation along Route 13	north of Bến Cát District, Bình Dương Province		
Nov 14–15	Operation Corn	1st Battalion, 12th Cavalry Regiment search and destroy operation	Bình Định Province		
Nov 14–22	Operation Bushmaster I	3rd Brigade, 1st Infantry Division search and destroy operation	south of the Michelin Rubber Plantation, Bình Dương Province	245	
Nov 15	Operation New Life	173rd Airborne Brigade, 1st Infantry Division and 10th Division rice harvest security	Bien Hoa and Binh Tuy Provinces		
Nov 15–16	Operation Docket I	1st Battalion, 2nd Infantry Regiment search and destroy operation	Bình Dương Province		
Nov 16–19	Operation Blue Marlin II	BLT 3rd Battalion, 3rd Marines amphibious operation tying in with two ARVN Ranger Battalions	35 km south of Da Nang	25	2 ARVN
Nov 18	Operation Road Runner II	3rd Brigade, 1st Infantry Division security operation	Bình Dương Province		
Nov 20	Operation Road Runner III	3rd Brigade, 1st Infantry Division security operation	Bình Dương Province		
Nov 20–26	Operation Silver Bayonet II	2/1 Cavalry search and destroy operation	Plei Me, Pleiku Province		
Nov 22	Operation Road Runner IV	3rd Brigade, 1st Infantry Division security operation	Bình Dương Province		
Nov 22–24	Operation Song Ve 6	3rd Battalion, 7th Marines, 3rd VNMC Battalion and ARVN 11th and 37th Ranger Battalions operation	Quảng Ngãi Province		
Nov 22–25	Operation Turkey Shoot	1st Battalion, 28th Infantry Regiment search and destroy operation	Bình Dương Province		
Nov 27	Operation Rabbit Hunt	2nd Battalion, 2nd Infantry Regiment search and destroy operation	Bình Dương Province		
Nov 28 – Dec 9	Operation Bushmaster II	3rd Brigade, 1st Infantry Division search and destroy operation	Bình Dương Province	318	44
Nov 28 – Dec 16	Operation Checkerboard II	1st Brigade, 101st Airborne Division search and destroy operation			
Nov 30 – Dec 1	Operation Riviera	1st Battalion, 28th Infantry Regiment search and destroy operation	Bình Dương Province		
Dec 3–7	Operation Ox Trail	2/1 Cavalry and 2nd Battalion, 12th Cavalry Regiment search and destroy operation	Bình Định Province		
Dec 6	Operation Give Up	2nd Battalion, 5th Cavalry Regiment reconnaissance operation	Bình Định Province		
Dec 6	Operation Gladiator	2nd Battalion, 28th Infantry Regiment search and destroy operation	Bình Dương Province		
Dec 6–9	Operation Charger Sweep	1/1 Cavalry search and destroy operation	Quảng Trị Province		
Dec 7–18	Operation Feline	1st Battalion, 28th Infantry Regiment search and destroy operation	Bình Dương Province		
Dec 8 – Nov 11 1968	Operation Tiger Hound	U.S. 2nd Air Division operation to interdict the Ho Chi Minh Trail in the lower portion of the Laotian panhandle, from Route 9 west of the DMZ, south to the Cambodian border and to reduce North Vietnamese infiltration down the trail into South Vietnam	Southeastern Laos		
Dec 9–15	Operation Sweeping Mustang	1/1 Cavalry search and destroy operation	II Corps		
Dec 9–16	Operation Bushmaster III	1st Brigade, 101st Airborne Division search and destroy operation	Bình Dương Province		
Dec 9–20	Operation Harvest Moon	2nd Battalion, 7th Marines 3rd Battalion, 3rd Marines, L and E Companies 2nd Battalion, 9th Marines, and G Company 2nd Battalion, 4th Marines and 3rd Battalion, 1st ARVN Regiment, 1st Battalion, 5th ARVN Regiment, 1st Battalion, 6th ARVN Regiment and ARVN 11th Ranger Battalion operation	37 km NW of Chu Lai in Phuoc Ha and Que Son Valley's, Quảng Tín Province	408	45 US, 90 ARVN
Dec 9–20	Operation Lien Ket 18	ARVN participation in Operation Harvest Moon	Thang Binh, Quảng Tín Province	75	11
Dec 10–14	Operation Fish Hook I	2/1 Cavalry search and destroy operation	Bình Định Province		
Dec 10–22	Operation Quick Kick	1/1 Cavalry security operation	Pleiku and Kon Tum Provinces		
Dec 11	Operation Frisk I	1st Battalion, 28th Infantry Regiment search and destroy operation	Bình Dương Province		
Dec 14–16	Operation Fish Hook II	2/1 Cavalry search and destroy operation	Bình Định Province		
Dec 14 – Jan 17 1966	Operation Viper II	2nd Battalion, 18th Infantry Regiment search and destroy operation	Biên Hòa Province	18	
Dec 16–19	Operation Clean House I	3/1 Cavalry search and destroy operation	Bình Định Province	1,400	
Dec 17	Operation Frisk II	1st Battalion, 28th Infantry Regiment reconnaissance operation	Bình Dương Province		
Dec 17	Operation Fulton	1st Cavalry Division search and destroy operation	Khánh Hòa, Tuyen Doc and Ninh Thuận Provinces		
Dec 17–20	Operation Scalping Mustang	1st Battalion, 8th Cavalry Regiment search and destroy operation	Bình Định Province		
Dec 17–21	Operation Beaver I	3rd Brigade, 1st Infantry Division road clearing and security operation	III Corps		
Dec 17–22	Operation Smash	173rd Airborne Brigade and 2nd Brigade, 1st Infantry Division search and destroy operation	Courtenay Rubber Plantation, Biên Hòa Province	73	
Dec 18 – 1972	Operation Game Warden	U.S. riverine patrol operation to deny Viet Cong access to the resources in the Mekong Delta	Mekong Delta	1000	39
Dec 19–20	Operation Jingle Bells	1st Battalion, 28th Infantry Regiment search and destroy operation	III Corps		
Dec 19–22	Operation Clean House II	3/1 Cavalry search and destroy operation	Bình Định Province		
Dec 23–26	Operation Cherokee Trail	1/1 Cavalry road security operation along Route 19	Bình Định, Kon Tum and Pleiku Provinces		
Dec 23 – Jan 23 66	Operation Blue Light	60th and 61st Military Airlift Wings airlift of the 25th Infantry Division from Hawaii to Pleiku	Pleiku		
Dec 27	Operation Hoa Xuan	1st Battalion, 4th Marines search and destroy operation	Hoa Xuan island		
Dec 27–31	Operation Clean House III	3/1 Cavalry search and destroy operation	Bình Định Province		
Dec 28–30	Operation Take Out	2nd Battalion, 327th Airborne Infantry Regiment recovery of US remains from a crashed AC-47 Spooky serial number 43-49492	Bình Thuận Province		
Dec 31	Operation Rebel Rouser	3rd Brigade, 1st Infantry Division road clearing and security operation on Route 13	Bình Dương Province		
Dec 31 – Jan 13 1966	Operation Matador I	2/1 Cavalry security and defence operation	Bình Định, Kon Tum and Pleiku Provinces		

== See also ==
- List of allied military operations of the Vietnam War (1966)
