= Bình Dương =

Bình Dương may refer to several places in Vietnam:

- Bình Dương, Ho Chi Minh City, a ward in the former city of Thủ Dầu Một, seat of the former Bình Dương province
- Bình Dương, Gia Lai, a commune in the former Phù Mỹ district, previously a township of former Bình Định province
- Bình Dương province, a former province in Southeast Vietnam, integrated into Ho Chi Minh City in 2025
- Bình Dương New City, a planned settlement in Bình Dương, Ho Chi Minh City.
