= Operation Coco Palms =

Date	June 25 - July 1, 1966
Location	Binh Duong province, Vietnam 11°10′N 106°40′E
Result	U.S. Victory

Belligerents
1st Battalion, 5th Infantry Regiment, 25th Infantry Division	Viet Cong

Commanders and leaders
Lt. Col. Thomas Greer	

Casualties and losses
6 Killed, 39 Wounded	25 Killed, 9 Captured
- Location within Vietnam

Operation Coco Palms was a U.S. Army search and destroy operation in Binh Duong and Hau Nghia provinces, Vietnam from 25 June 1966 to 1 July 1966 involving the 1st Battalion, 5th Infantry Regiment, 25th Infantry Division. The area had already been the focus of several operations and intelligence indicated that there were large numbers of Viet Cong in the area.

As the battalion, led by Lt. Col. Thomas Greer, moved into the area they encountered mines and came under fire, but were not able to locate large concentrations of enemy forces. The battalion captured weapons, ammunition, medical supplies, food, equipment, and documents. They also destroyed a large tunnel complex that could serve a regiment sized unit.

The battalion suffered 14 M113 Armored Personnel Carriers damaged, 39 wounded and 6 killed in action. They reported 25 enemy killed and 9 captured. At least one soldier - Spec. 4 Riley Brassfield was awarded a Bronze Star with V device for his actions.
