= List of allied military operations of the Vietnam War (1973–74) =

This article is a list of known military operations of the Vietnam War in 1973 and 1974, conducted by the armed forces of the Republic of Vietnam, the Khmer Republic, the United States and their allies.

Date Duration	Operation Name	Unit(s) – Description	Location	VC-PAVN KIAs	Allied KIAs
Jan 28 - Jul 18 73	Operation End Sweep	US Navy demining of Haiphong Harbour, mined as part of Operation Pocket Money	Haiphong Harbour		
Feb 12 – Apr 4 73	Operation Homecoming	Repatriation of U.S. prisoners of war from North Vietnam	Gia Lam Airport		
Apr 27 - May 2 74	Operation Svay Rieng	Last major ARVN operation with a major thrust against the North Vietnamese 5th Division	Đức Huệ District, Long An Province	1200	

== See also ==
- List of allied military operations of the Vietnam War (1975)
