= Operation Orange =

- Part of the South African Border War and Cuban intervention in Angola
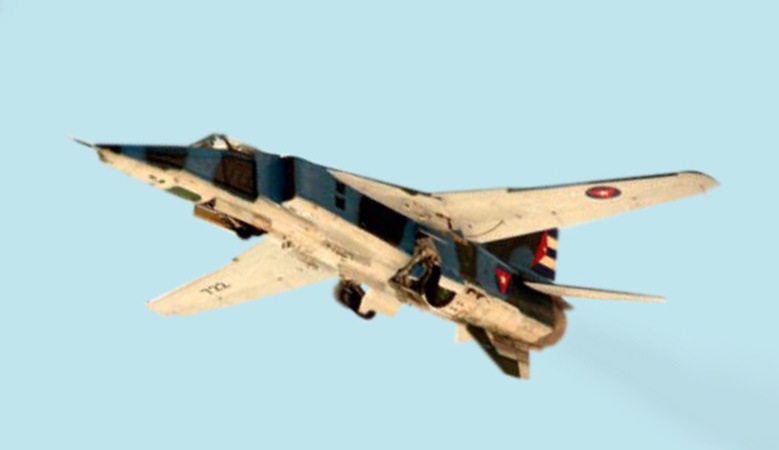
- Mikoyan-Gurevich MiG-23 of the Cuban Revolutionary Air and Air Defense Force (DAAFAR)
- Planned: August 1985
- Planned by: Captain Jorge González Perez; Trujillo Hernández; Eduardo González Sarria
- Objective: Destruction of South African aircraft and air defences at Ondangwa, Ruacana, or Rundu
- Date: July 1986
- Executed by: Cuban Revolutionary Air and Air Defense Force
- Outcome: Cancelled

Operation Orange was a planned Cuban air interdiction campaign to be carried out against the South African Air Force (SAAF) during the South African Border War. It was originally scheduled for July 1986, but was postponed until September 1986, when it was finally cancelled. The purpose of Operation Orange was to cripple the SAAF's ability to conduct combat operations over Angola by attacking one or all three of its primary bases in northern South West Africa (Namibia) with Kh-23 Grom missiles and unguided bombs.

== Background ==
The Cuban Revolutionary Air and Air Defense Force (DAAFAR) had been stationed in Angola since January 1976, when the first of its pilots arrived to train and support the newly established People's Air Force of Angola (FAPA). From its onset, the Cuban military mission in Angola operated a single squadron each of Mikoyan-Gurevich MiG-21MF and Mikoyan-Gurevich MiG-17F interceptors loosely organized into a DAAFAR "Air Group", with the intention of gradually transferring its responsibilities and aircraft to FAPA over time as more Angolan pilots were trained. The DAAFAR Air Group worked alongside FAPA and the Angolan general staff but functioned independently, outside their chain of command. FAPA did not formally establish its own fighter squadron until the early 1980s, so DAAFAR's Air Group shouldered the burden of supporting Cuban and Angolan ground operations as part of the ongoing Angolan Civil War. Additionally, DAAFAR pilots continued to fly most of the more sophisticated FAPA aircraft through the mid 1980s, when more Angolan pilots became available as a result of a massive training and rearmament programme sponsored by the Soviet Union.

FAPA and DAAFAR's primary opponent in this theatre was the South African Air Force (SAAF), which routinely violated Angolan airspace and carried out strike missions in support of South African ground forces mounting cross-border incursions. The SAAF primarily attacked training camps for the People's Liberation Army of Namibia (PLAN) and uMkhonto weSizwe (MK), militant black nationalist groups opposed to South Africa's white minority government. During Operation Reindeer in 1978, the SAAF carried out a controversial strike on a site in Cassinga which the South African authorities had identified as a regional PLAN headquarters; PLAN claimed it was a refugee camp. South African paratroopers then assaulted the camp from the ground. A Cuban motorised infantry battalion stationed in the adjacent settlement of Tchamutete advanced towards Cassinga to stop the raid, but came under repeated SAAF attack with bombs and air-to-ground rockets, resulting in at least 60 dead.

Whenever a major ground operation was underway, the SAAF also dedicated a large number of sorties to destroying local FAPA air defence installations in order to maintain its freedom of movement over southern Angola. During Operation Protea in 1981, the SAAF destroyed FAPA's radar stations at Chibemba and Cahama, as well as its ground-based air defence sites in three other towns: Xangongo, Ondjiva, and Humbe.

These air campaigns were carried out from the SAAF's bases in neighbouring South West Africa (Namibia), then under South African administration. A mixed force of multirole fighters and trainers utilised as strike aircraft, as well as dedicated bombers, was deployed. The SAAF carried out constant aerial bombardment of its targets in Angola using English Electric Canberras and Blackburn Buccaneers launched from a large base at Grootfontein, and Mirage F1AZs and Atlas Impalas launched from smaller bases near the border, namely Ondangwa.

== Prelude ==
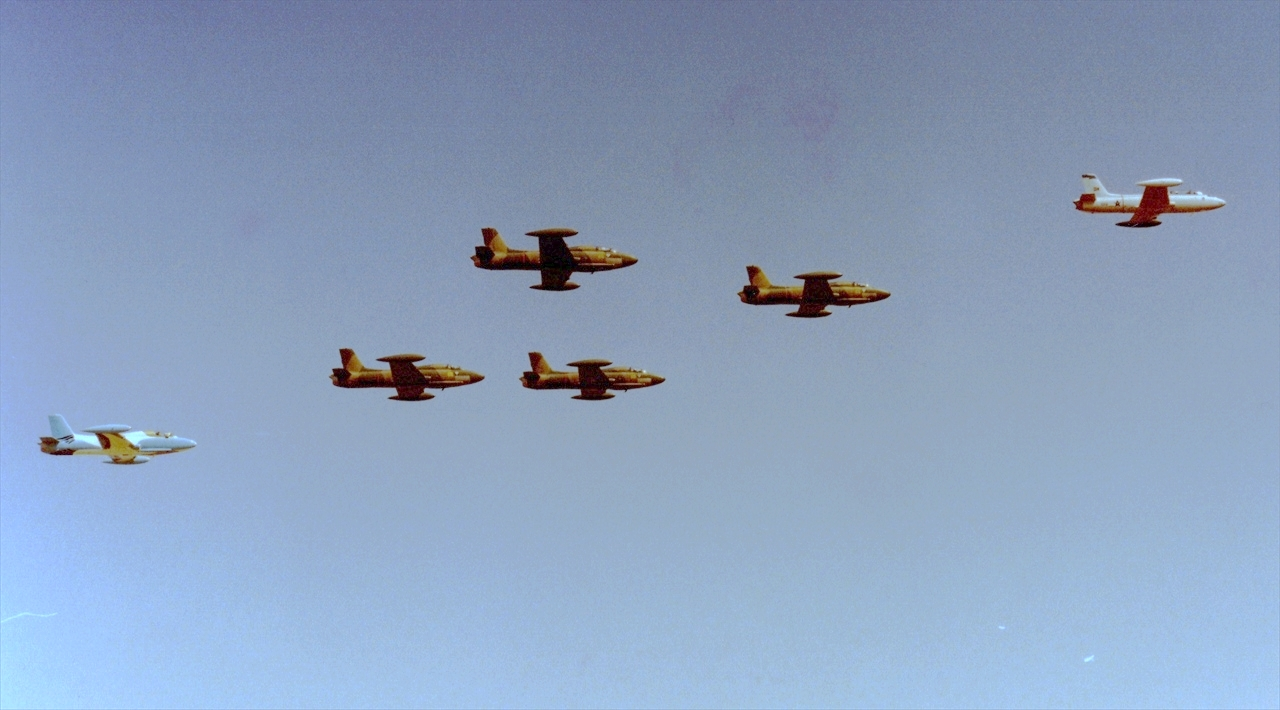
SAAF Impalas flying in close formation. These were light trainers often repurposed as strike aircraft in Angola

Partly to counter the increased SAAF threat, DAAFAR greatly expanded its presence in Angola with Soviet logistical and technical support. By the end of 1983 DAAFAR had an entire fighter regiment stationed in Angola, the 25th Regimento de Aviaҫão de Caça-Bombardeiro (25th Fighter-Bomber Regiment), primarily equipped with the two seater MiG-21bis interceptor. The regiment was headquartered in Lubango, but its squadrons frequently operated from other air bases where necessary.

After the end of the Ogaden War in 1978, the Soviet Union agreed to supply Cuba with the Mikoyan-Gurevich MiG-23 primarily to support air operations over Angola as well as Ethiopia, both conflict zones where Cuban pilots were forced to contend with enemy pilots in more sophisticated Western aircraft. However, the first DAAFAR MiG-23 squadrons did not become operational until October 1983. DAAFAR initially operated 45 MiG-23BNs and 2 MiG-23UBs, with another 24 MiG-23MFs delivered in 1984. In addition, the Soviet Union agreed to deliver 48 MiG-23MLs directly to Angola, with the first 12 arriving in May 1984. By early 1985, the 25th Fighter-Bomber Regiment was operating two fighter squadrons of MiG-23s of varying configurations each in Angola, as well as a third squadron still equipped with the older MiG-21bis.

FAPA would not establish its own MiG-23 squadron until May 1985, and its formation was handicapped by technical and administrative delays. Consequently, Cuba's 25th Fighter-Bomber Regiment continued to shoulder the bulk of interception and close air support responsibilities in Angola from 1983 to 1986.

On August 2, 1983, 3,000 insurgents of the National Union for the Total Independence of Angola (UNITA) carried out a major offensive on Cangamba, inflicting heavy casualties on the town's Angolan and Cuban garrison. Nine DAAFAR MiG-21 pilots based out of Menongue flew up to 23 strike missions a day in an attempt to relieve the garrison and prevent the town from being overrun. Both DAAFAR and FAPA fighter pilots clocked over 400 sorties during the UNITA siege. South Africa, which was allied with UNITA and intent on molding it into a proxy to harass PLAN and destablise Angola's Marxist government, played an instrumental role in supporting the siege. From its onset, SAAF transport planes carried out nocturnal airdrops of supplies to the UNITA forces involved. SAAF Mirages also flew regular feints well within range of the FAPA radar in Menongue, forcing DAAFAR to deploy additional MiG-21bis fighters with air-to-air ordnance to escort the pilots carrying out strike missions. The decision was made to abandon the town due to its increasingly untenable defense. Between August 12 and August 14, the SAAF launched a two-day aerial bombardment of Cangamba with Canberras and Impalas to effectively destroy what remained of the town and prevent the defenders from refortifying it. DAAFAR evacuated all Cuban personnel by helicopter on the first day of the bombardment. The Angolan defenders withdrew on August 13.

In August 1985, the 25th Fighter-Bomber Regiment redeployed 6 MiG-23MLs from Lubango to Luena in support an Angolan ground offensive codenamed Operation Second Congress, against UNITA's primary logistics base at Mavinga. In direct response to the appearance of the DAAFAR MiG-23s over its traditional operating area, the SAAF also redeployed a large number of its combat aircraft to its northernmost bases in South West Africa, including 10 Mirage F1AZs and 7 Mirage F1CZs, plus additional numbers of Canberra and Buccaneer bombers, as well as Impalas repurposed for strike missions. DAAFAR in turn responded by deploying an additional 6 MiG-23MLs and 1 MiG-23UB. These MiG-23MLs were deployed with R-23 and R-60 air-to-air missiles, and flew escort for the strike missions, as during the Cangamba siege.

The increased buildup of air power on both sides led to numerous attempts to intercept and destroy the enemy's fighters, as well as evade interception. The SAAF pilots began flying at lower altitudes to evade radar detection. Meanwhile, DAAFAR pilots began flying high to save fuel and extend their time "on station" over the operational area, exposing themselves to potential interception and allowing the South Africans to track and plot their flight paths when they entered within range of early warning radars in South West Africa. The SAAF used this to its advantage by timing strike missions strategically to avoid the MiG-23s.

== Planning ==
In August 1985, the Cuban general staff in Angola requested DAAFAR examine the feasibility of an aerial strike campaign against SAAF bases in South West Africa. The SAAF bases at Ondangwa, Ruacana, and Rundu were identified as potential targets. DAAFAR calculated probable attack routes, flight profiles necessary to avoid radar detection, fuel consumption, and the possibility of SAAF retaliatory strikes. On 5 August 1985, DAAFAR pilots in Angola began carrying out test flights to simulate the flying conditions and distances necessary for the mission, which was codenamed Operation Orange.

The decision was made to carry out Operation Orange with DAAFAR's relatively new Mikoyan-Gurevich MiG-23 fighter aircraft. These were supplied to Cuba by the Soviet Union beginning in 1978, and were primarily intended to support air operations over Ethiopia and Angola, where Cuban pilots were beginning to encounter enemy pilots in more sophisticated Western aircraft. On 20 August 1985, DAAFAR redeployed a squadron of 11 MiG-23s and their pilots to the airfield at Menongue in preparation for Operation Orange. This was one of DAAFAR's earliest deployments of the MiG-23 to the Angolan theatre; it would not begin to operate large numbers of this aircraft there until late 1986 and early 1987.

The squadron's personnel included Captain Jorge González Perez, as well as Eduardo González Sarria and Trujillo Hernández. Hernández flew a test flight at full fuel load to Ondjiva, near the South West African border, on 21 August.

At Cuba's request, the Soviet Union supplied both satellite imagery of the South African bases, as well as Kh-23 Grom missiles and FAB-500M-62 general purpose bombs for the purpose of carrying out Operation Orange.

The operation was cancelled in September 1986.

== Execution ==
The plan called for two MiG-23s to lead the attack by making an initial strike on the South African air defences with Kh-23s. These would be followed by another four MiG-23s attacking the airfield and surrounding installations with bombs. Four MiG-23ML interceptors were to escort the strike aircraft: two armed with two R-24 missiles and two R-60 missiles apiece, and the other two with four R-60 missiles each.

== Notes and citations ==
Citations

Online sources

- Cooper, Tom; Kyzer, Jonathan (2 September 2003). "Angola: Claims & Reality about SAAF Losses". Air Combat Information Group. Archived from the original on May 19, 2004.

Bibliography

- Fontanellaz, Adrien; Matos, Jose Augustus; Cooper, Tom (2021). War of Intervention in Angola, Volume 4: Angolan and Cuban Air Forces, 1985-1988. Warwick: Helion & Company. ISBN 978-1804510964.
- Fontanellaz, Adrien; Matos, Jose Augustus; Cooper, Tom (2020). War of Intervention in Angola, Volume 3: Angolan and Cuban Air Forces, 1975-1985. Warwick: Helion & Company. ISBN 978-1913118617.
- George, Edward (2005). The Cuban intervention in Angola. New York: Frank Cass Publishers. ISBN 978-0415647106.
- Lord, Dick (2008). From Fledgling to Eagle. The South African Air Force during the Border War (Kindle ed.). Solihull, England: Helion & Company. ISBN 978-1908916624.
