= Lists of allied military operations of the Vietnam War =

The many allied military operations of the Vietnam War are listed on the following pages, either alphabetically, or chronologically.

== Lists ==
=== By year ===
- List of allied military operations of the Vietnam War (1964)
- List of allied military operations of the Vietnam War (1965)
- List of allied military operations of the Vietnam War (1966)
- List of allied military operations of the Vietnam War (1967)
- List of allied military operations of the Vietnam War (1968)
- List of allied military operations of the Vietnam War (1969)
- List of allied military operations of the Vietnam War (1970)
- List of allied military operations of the Vietnam War (1971)
- List of allied military operations of the Vietnam War (1972)
- List of allied military operations of the Vietnam War (1973–1974)
- List of allied military operations of the Vietnam War (1975)

== See also ==
- First Indochina War
- Vietnamization
- Vietnam War casualties
- Aircraft losses of the Vietnam War
