= Operation Kahala =

Coordinates: 10°56′46.55″N 106°24′25.74″E

- 1st Battalion, 5th (Mech) Infantry soldier during Operation Kahala
Date	April 16–21, 1966
Location	Hậu Nghĩa Province

Belligerents
U.S. Army	Viet Cong

Casualties and losses
3 killed, 45 wounded	47 killed, 22 prisoners
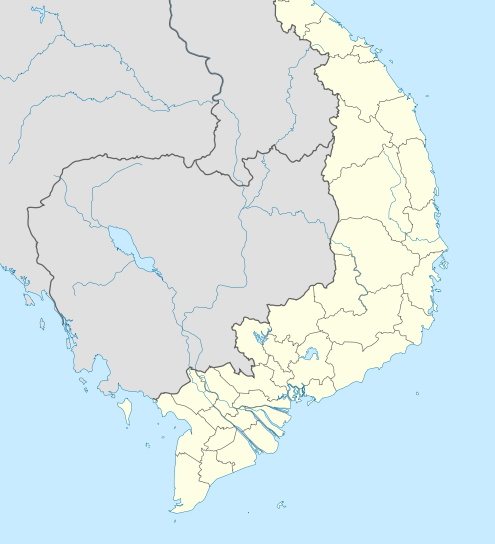
- Location within South Vietnam

Operation Kahala was a brigade sized search and destroy mission during the Vietnam War led by the 2nd Brigade of the 25th Infantry Division in the Hậu Nghĩa province on 16–21 April 1966.

The mechanized infantry brigade used armor, artillery, air support and helicopters. They moved into the area on 16 April and were met with Viet Cong sniper fire, booby traps and mines. On that night, the enemy attacked U.S. positions and were repulsed. Over the next days, 25th Division artillery and air strikes suppressed enemy attack. The brigade followed behind with armored personnel carriers and tanks.

The brigade destroyed tunnels, supplies, weapons and captured documents. The Viet Cong suffered 47 killed and 22 captured, while U.S. forces sustained 3 killed and 45 wounded. U.S. forces also evacuated civilian women and children and turned them over to local authorities.
