= Operation Highland =

1965 US military operation in Vietnam

- Part of Vietnam War
Location	Binh Dinh Province Vietnam
Result	US Victory

Belligerents
United States	Viet Cong

Units involved
327th Infantry 502 Infantry 1st Cavalry	2nd Regiment, 3rd PAVN Division

Casualties and losses
21KIA, 22WIA	692 KIA, 49+ POW

Operation Highland was a military operation conducted by the United States 1st Brigade, beginning on August 22, 1965. Its main purpose, was to establish a base camp for the 1st Cavalry division at An Khe and to ensure its safe arrival; as well as reopening route 19 from Qui Nhon to An Khe. The operation was conducted in four separate phases spanning from August 22 to October 1, 1965.

== Background ==
In February 1965, the Vietnamese launched an attack aimed at a portion of the road spanning between Mang Yang Pass and An Khe. This assault was ultimately driven back, but a heavy Vietnamese presence along route 19 between Pleiku and Qui Nhon remained. This presence was enough to interdict supplies and caused shortages of food and ammunition. In June the Vietnamese blew out multiple bridges along route 19 making the western towns of Pleiku, Kontum and Ban Me Thuot accessible only by air. Facing shortages it was decided that route 19 had to be reopened and a base established at the old French airstrip of An Khe. Originally General Westmoreland wanted to establish this base in the Highlands outside of Pleiku, but An Khe was ultimately decided upon as it was closer to Qui Nhon and therefore not as far removed from its supply lines.

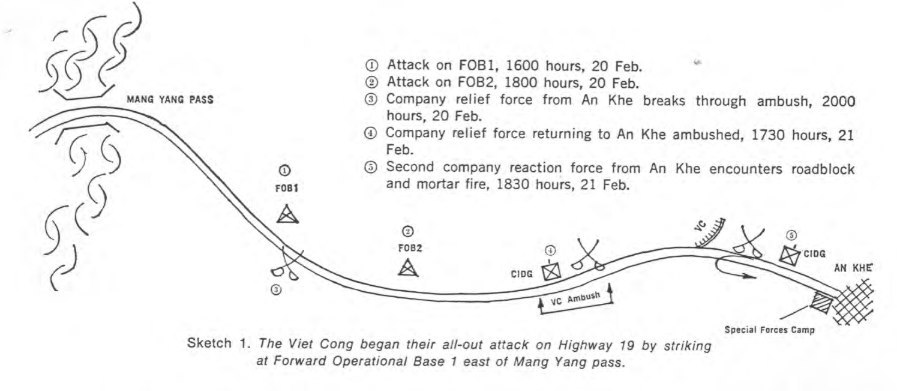
Map Sketch of February Attack on Route 19 and An Khe.

== Phase I & II ==
Phase one took place between August 22 to 25. The 2d of the 327th infantry was air assaulted into An Khe and established a perimeter around its airstrip. Meanwhile, the rest of the Brigade landed in Qui Nhon and moved west along route 19. Phase two began on the 26th as 1d of the 327th infantry along with 2d of the 502 infantry cleared route 19 west of Qui Nhon through to An Khe with the help of air and artillery support and linked up with 2d of the 327th still guarding the An Khe airstrip.

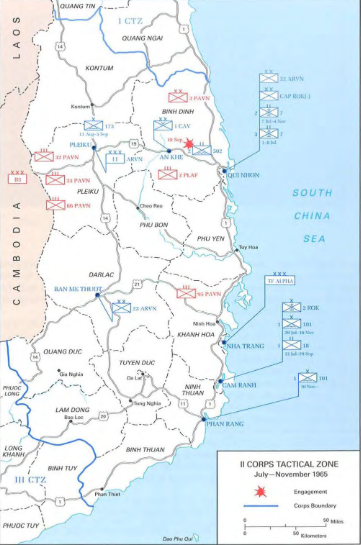
Troop location during Operation Highland, battle of An Nihn is marked in red.

== Phase III ==
Phase three began on August 27, and lasted until September 28. The objective of this phase was for the 327th and the 502nd infantry to conduct patrols, sweeps and search and destroy operations in an attempt to keep route 19 open while the 1st cavalry division arrived at their new base camp. A total of 23 separate operations were conducted including 8 air mobile assaults, but aside from one serious engagement on the 18–21 September at An Ninh, Vietnamese resistance was light. This engagement was known as Operation Gibraltar or the Battle of An Ninh and was the only major engagement under Highland's scope.

== Phase IV ==
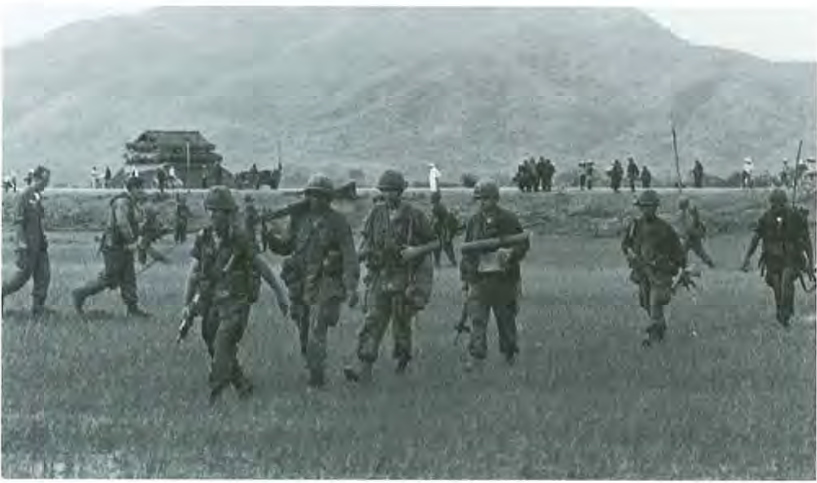
Troops of the 101 Airborne along Route 19 during Operation Highland.

On September 28, the 1st Cavalry assumed responsibility for the defence of An Khe and the first Brigade relocated to the base camp of Dong Ba Thin.

== Aftermath ==
Operation Highland obtained all objectives and was considered a success. The Battle of An Nihn was the first victory of US troops over a Main Vietnamese force. The base camp established at An Khe would later go on to be named Camp Radcliff. In total 21 Allied servicemen were killed along with an estimated 692 Vietnamese soldiers; this includes the casualties from Operation Gibraltar
