= Bến Thủy =

Ben Thuy port

Location
- Country: Vietnam
- Coordinates: 18.6573°N 105.7066°E

Ben Thuy is a trading port on the opening of the Ca River in Vietnam. Ben Thuy is near the city of Vinh. The Ben Thuy Thermal Power Plant and Ben Thuy Port and Ferry were listed as targets in a telegram during the Vietnam War.
