= List of allied military operations of the Vietnam War (1975) =

This is a list of known military operations of the Vietnam War in 1975, conducted by the armed forces of the United States.

Date duration	Operation name	Unit(s) – description	Location	VC-PAVN KIAs	Allied KIAs
Apr 3 – 26	Operation Babylift	Mass evacuation/airlift of orphans from South Vietnam to the United States and other countries	Tan Son Nhut		
Apr 12	Operation Eagle Pull	Evacuation of US citizens, "at-risk" Cambodians and 3rd country nationals	Phnom Penh		
Apr 29 – 30	Operation Frequent Wind	Helicopter evacuation of U.S. and South Vietnamese citizens and 3rd country nationals before the fall of Saigon	Saigon		2
May 15	Mayaguez Incident	Rescue of SS Mayaguez and crew	Koh Tang Island, Cambodia	60+ Khmer Rouges	21
Apr 3 - Sep 3	Operation New Life	Resettlement of over 110,000 refugees from Indochina			

== See also ==
- Vietnam War casualties
- Aircraft losses of the Vietnam War
