= Long Sơn Island =

Coordinates: 10°27′46″N 107°04′49″E

Long Sơn Island is an estuary island near Vũng Tàu, Vietnam.

The Grand House of Long Son, home of the Ong Tran religion, is situated on the island.

During the Vietnam War, the Viet Cong (C41 Company Chau Duc District Company) used the island as a rest and training centre. In November 1966, Operations Yass and Hayman were undertaken by 3rd Squadron SAS and the 5th Battalion, Royal Australian Regiment upon the island. It has taken countless attacks before being taken over by the 3rd Squadron SAS.

For the month of May 1970, under the command of 1st Australian Task Force, Whisky Company from Royal New Zealand Infantry Regiment were deployed to Long Son Island to destroy Viet Cong locations on the island while protecting the engineers from 17th Construction Squadron who were building water sources for the village of Xa Long Son.
