= Bình Dương, Gia Lai =

Bình Dương Xã Bình Dương
- Commune
- Bình Dương commune
- Location within Vietnam
- Coordinates: 14°17′40″N 109°04′47″E
- Country: Vietnam
- Province: Gia Lai province
- Time zone: UTC+7 (UTC + 7)

Bình Dương is a commune (xã) of Gia Lai province, Vietnam.

Bình Dương commune covers a largely rural area in the Central Highlands of Vietnam, where agriculture and local services form the backbone of the local economy.

After administrative reorganizations in 2025, the commune was formed from the merger of Bình Dương town, Mỹ Lợi, and Mỹ Phong communes, with its administrative center located at the former Bình Dương township.
