= Operation Kahuku =

Coordinates: 11°8′29.1″N 106°27′42.65″E

Date	April 7, 1966
Location	Củ Chi

Belligerents
U.S. Army	Viet Cong

Units involved
5th Infantry Regiment; 69th Armor Regiment	

Casualties and losses
8 wounded	28 killed, 18 prisoners
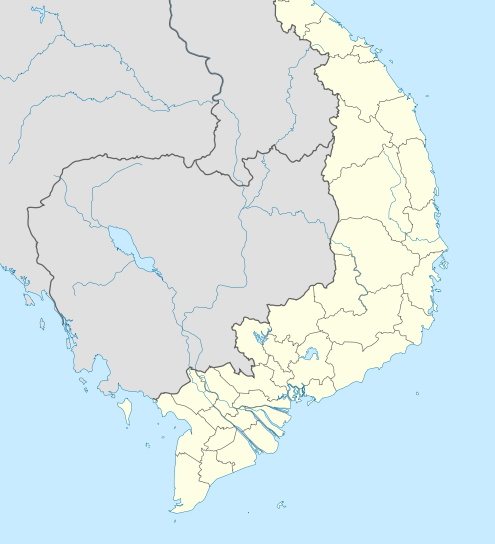
- Location within South Vietnam

Operation Kahuku was a search and destroy mission during the Vietnam War led by Task Force GREER composed of elements of the 5th Infantry Regiment of the 25th Infantry Division supported by 69th Armor Regiment in the Củ Chi area on 7 April 1966.

Mechanized infantry and armor moved quickly through the area of rice paddies, woods and marsh near Củ Chi. Intelligence led the task force to believe that they would face a Viet Cong force of around 110 men. The actual total was much smaller and the enemy was found in small groups of 4-5 men in tunnels, bunkers and spider holes. Two of the unit's helicopters were hit by ground fire and one crashed.

After searching the area, 26 Viet Cong were killed and 18 prisoners were handed over to the local police. They destroyed weapons, buildings and tunnels of the enemy before turning over the area to teh 49th ARVN Regiment. Eight American soldiers were wounded. The operation was part of a much larger series of 60 search and destroy missions in Vietnam during that time period.

The operation got its name from Kahuku Beach, a quiet white sand beach on the island of O'ahu, Hawaii.

== Củ Chi tunnels today ==
The Củ Chi tunnels are a tourist attraction in Ho Chi Minh City (previously Saigon) as a part of a war memorial park in the city.
