= Bình Long =

Bình Long Phường Bình Long An Lộc
- Ward
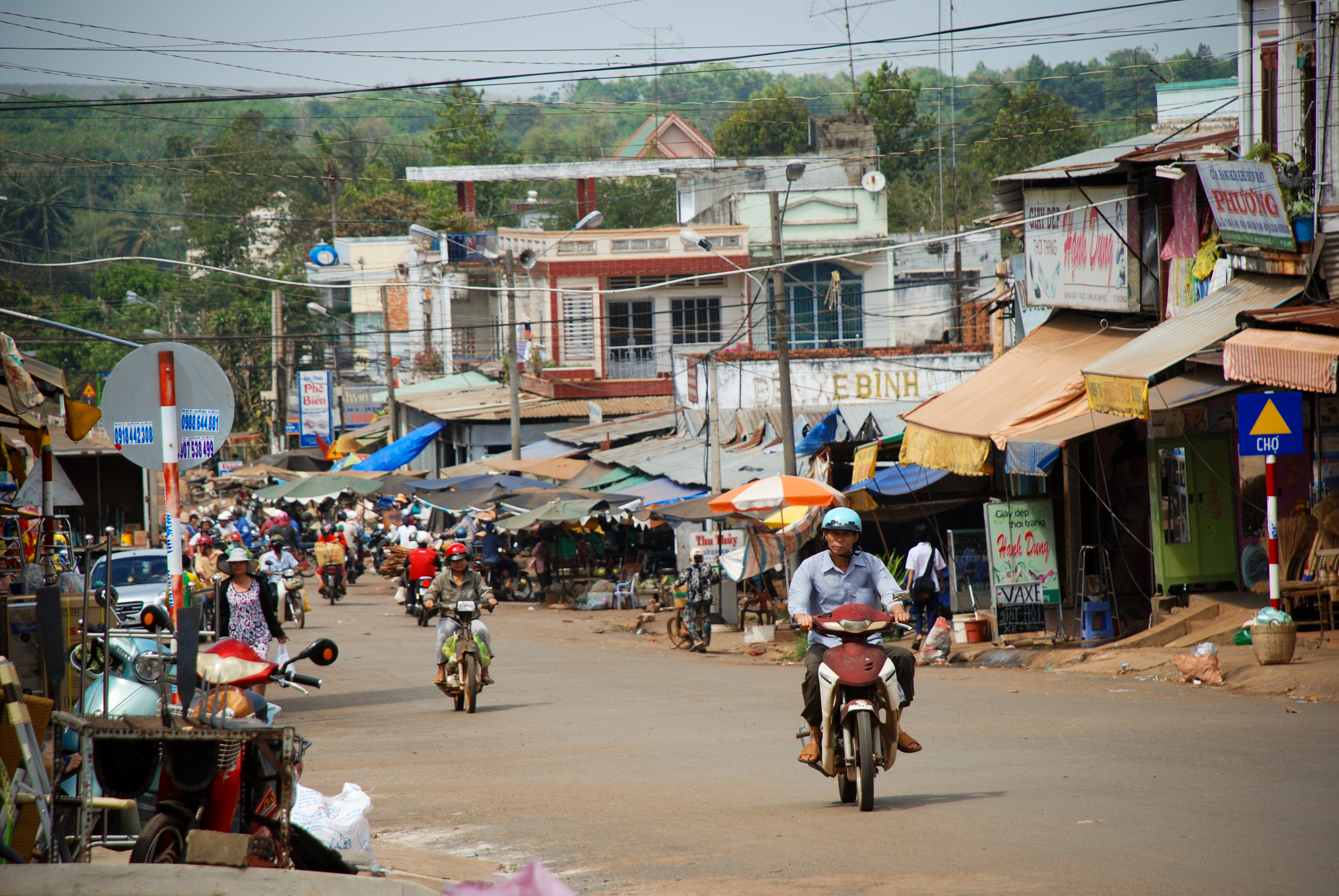
- Hùng Vương Street in Bình Long
- Interactive map of Bình Long
- Coordinates: 11°39′39″N 106°35′35″E
- Country: Vietnam
- Municipality: Đồng Nai
- Established: June 16, 2025

Area
  - Total: 18.97 sq mi (49.14 km^{2})

Population (2024)
  - Total: 41,048
  - Density: 2,163/sq mi (835.3/km^{2})
- Time zone: UTC+07:00 (Indochina Time)
- Administrative code: 25326

Bình Long (Vietnamese: Phường Bình Long) is a ward of Đồng Nai, Vietnam. It is one of the 95 new wards, communes and special zones of the province following the reorganization in 2025.

== History ==
On June 16, 2025, the National Assembly Standing Committee issued Resolution No. 1662/NQ-UBTVQH15 on the arrangement of commune-level administrative units of Đồng Nai province in 2025 (effective from June 16, 2025). Accordingly, the entire land area and population of An Lộc, Hưng Chiến, Phú Đức wards of the former Bình Long town and Thanh Bình commune of the former Hớn Quản district will be integrated into a new ward named Bình Long (Clause 83, Article 1).
