= Sông Bé province =

Historic province of Vietnam

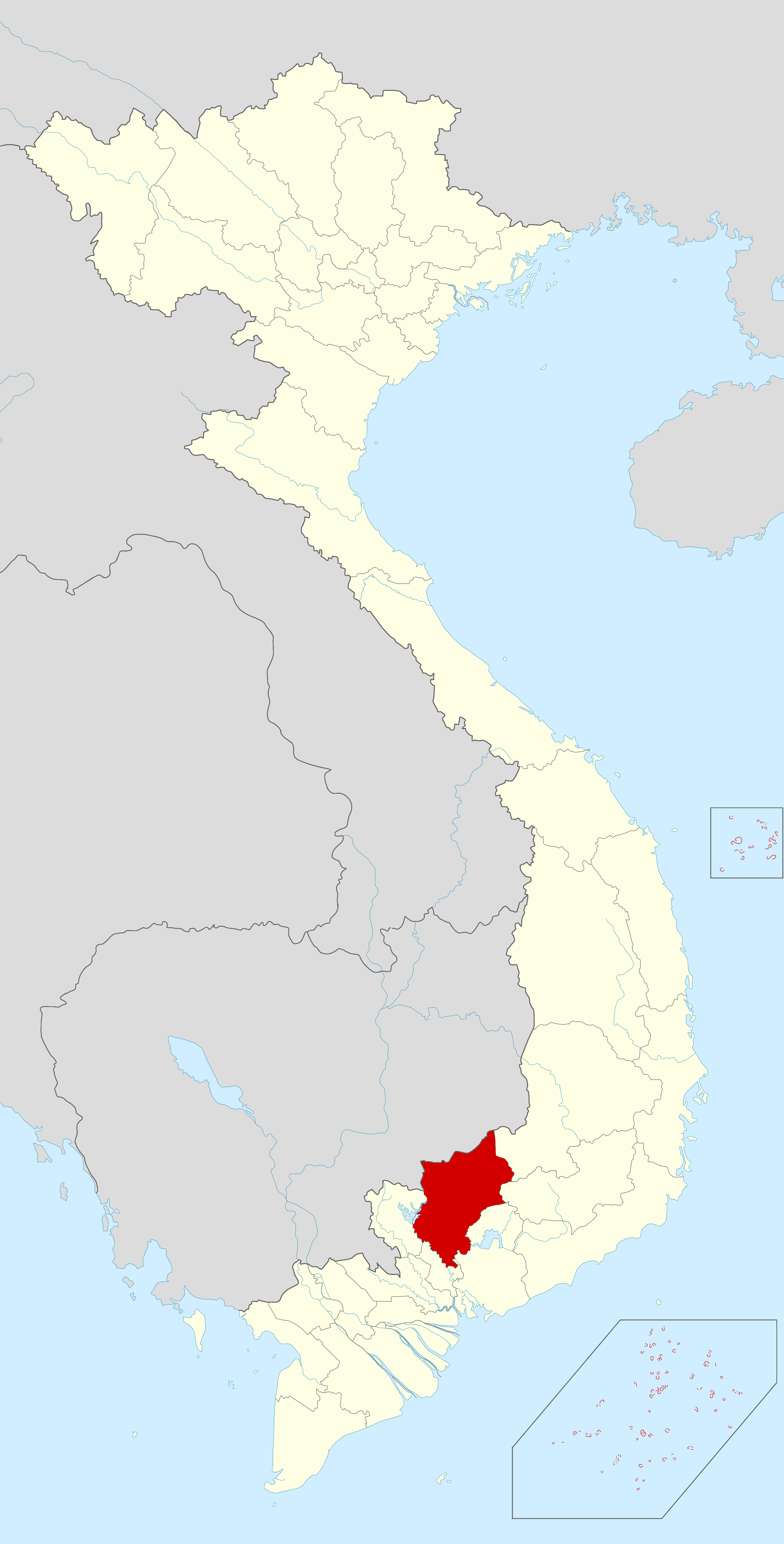
Location of Sông Bé Province on a map of Vietnam in 1976

Sông Bé was a province in southern Vietnam, today a part of Ho Chi Minh City and Đồng Nai City.

Sông Bé bordered Cambodia to the north, Lâm Đồng to the east, Đắk Lắk to the northeast, Ho Chi Minh City and Đồng Nai to the south and Tây Ninh to the west.

Sông Bé was formed in 1976 in a merger of three previous provinces, Bình Dương, Phước Long and Bình Long. Its capital was at Thủ Dầu Một. In 1995, it had an area of 8519.4 km^{2} and population of 1081700. On 1 January 1997, it was again split into two provinces, Bình Dương and Bình Phước.

The separation revealed the regional inequality within the former province: while Bình Dương is one of the most industrialised provinces in southern Vietnam, Bình Phước is one of the least industrialised — in the late 1990s even less industrialised than the provinces of the Central Highlands. However, the gap between the two provinces has diminished gradually since separation in relatively terms.

== Districts ==
- Bình Long (merged in 1977 from Hớn Quản, Chơn Thành and parts of Lộc Ninh districts)
- Phước Long (merged in 1977 from Bù Đốp, Phước Bình and Bù Đăng districts)
- Lộc Ninh
- Đồng Phú (merged in 1977 from Đồng Xoài and Phú Giáo districts)
- Tân Uyên
- Bến Cát
- Thuận An
- Bù Đăng (renamed from Đức Phong)

== Notable natives of Sông Bé ==
- Kristine Sa, Vietnamese-Canadian singer and poet (born 1982)
- Nguyễn Anh Đức, Vietnamese striker (born 1985)
- Tâm Đoan, Vietnamese-Canadian singer (born 1977)
