= Đàm Văn Ngụy =

Vietnamese general (1921 – 1988)

Lieutenant General Đàm Văn Ngụy

Personal details
- Born: Văn Chung; May 1, 1927 Thạch An, Cao Bằng, Tonkin (French protectorate)
- Died: February 15, 2015 (aged 87) Hà Nội, Việt Nam
- Party: Communist Party of Vietnam

Military service
- Allegiance: Democratic Republic of Vietnam and later Vietnam
- Branch/service: People's Army of Vietnam
- Rank: Lieutenant General
- Battles/wars: First Indochina War; Operation Léa; Vietnam War; Battle of Dak To; Battle of Lộc Ninh; Battle of An Lộc; Battle of Ban Me Thuot; Sino-Vietnamese War
- Awards: Hero of the People's Armed Forces

Đàm Văn Ngụy (1927–2015) was a lieutenant-general in the People's Army of Vietnam (PAVN) active during all three Indochina Wars. He led the 7th Infantry Division in the Battle of An Lộc, and the 316th Division in the Battle of Ban Me Thuot.

== Early years ==
Đàm Văn Ngụy was born in Thạch An District of Cao Bằng province on 1 May 1927. He joined Việt Minh in July 1942, then Armed Propaganda Unit for National Liberation in January 1945.

== Military career ==
In July 1956, Đàm Văn Ngụy was awarded the Hero of the People's Armed Forces. In February 1960, he was appointed to commander of the 174th Regiment of the 316th Division.

In Battle of Dak To, Đàm Văn Ngụy commanded the 174th Regiment (Cao - Bắc - Lạng Regiment) (in the formation of the 1st Infantry Division) fighting against U.S. Army 173rd Airborne Brigade.

In Battle of Lộc Ninh and Battle of An Lộc, Senior Colonel Ngụy led the 7th Infantry Division blocking National Route 13 section between An Lộc and Chơn Thành for 150 days from 5 April 1972 to 28 August 1972.
