= Thanh Bình =

Thanh Bình may refer to several places in Vietnam:

- Thanh Bình District, a rural district of Đồng Tháp Province
- Thanh Bình, Đà Nẵng, a ward of Hải Châu District
- Thanh Bình, Biên Hòa, a ward of Biên Hòa in Đồng Nai Province
- Thanh Bình, Điện Biên, a ward of Điện Biên Phủ
- Thanh Bình, Hải Dương, a ward of Hải Dương
- Thanh Bình, Ninh Bình, a ward of Ninh Bình
- Thanh Bình, Bù Đốp, a township and capital of Bù Đốp District in Bình Phước Province
- Thanh Bình, Đồng Tháp, a township and capital of Thanh Bình District
- Thanh Bình, Chương Mỹ, a commune of Chương Mỹ District in Hanoi
- Thanh Bình, Sa Pa, a commune of Sa Pa in Lào Cai Province
- Thanh Bình, Tiền Giang, a commune of Chợ Gạo District
- Thanh Bình, Hớn Quản, a commune of Hớn Quản District in Bình Phước Province
- Thanh Bình, Mường Khương, a commune of Mường Khương District in Lào Cai Province
- Thanh Bình, Trảng Bom, a commune of Trảng Bom District in Đồng Nai Province
- Thanh Bình, Vĩnh Long, a commune of Vũng Liêm District
