= Battle of An Lộc =

Battle during the Vietnam War (1972)

- Part of the Easter Offensive in the Vietnam War
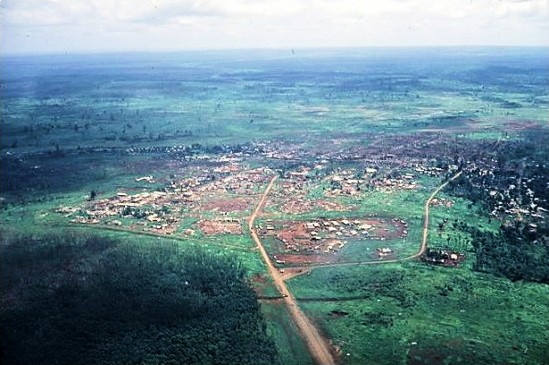
- An Lộc, as viewed from the air in 1972.
Date	April 13, 1972 – July 20, 1972 (3 months and 1 week)
Location	An Lộc, Bình Long Province, South Vietnam
Result	South Vietnamese and US victory

Belligerents
North Vietnam; Viet Cong	South Vietnam; United States

Commanders and leaders
(North Vietnam) Trần Văn Trà; Đồng Văn Cống; Trần Văn Phác; Lê Ngọc Hiền; Bùi Thanh Vân; Đàm Văn Ngụy; Nguyễn Thới Bưng	(South Vietnam) Nguyễn Văn Minh; Lê Văn Hưng; Lê Nguyên Vỹ; Trần Văn Nhựt; Lê Quang Lưỡng (United States) J.F. Hollingsworth; Richard J. Tallman †

Strength
Overall ~ 31,640+ 5th Division ~ 9,230: 174th, 275th, E6 Regt; 9th Division ~ 10,680: 271st, 272nd, 95th Regt; 203rd Tank Regiment ~ 800: D20 & D21 Battalions; 429th Sapper Group ~ 320; 7th Division ~ 8,600: 141st, 165th, 209th Regt; 101st Regiment ~ 760; 205th Regiment ~ 1,250; Fire support: 75th Artillery Group (U80): 42d Artillery Regt; 208th Rocket Regt; 271st AAA Regt	(South Vietnam) At An Loc: 7,500 5th Division ~3,950: 7th, 8th, 9th Regt; Task Force 52; 51st Artillery Battalion; six 155mm howitzers; 3rd Ranger Group ~1,300; Bình Long Sector ~2,000 Reinforcements: 25,000+ 1st Airborne Brigade; 81st Abn. Commando ~550; 21st Infantry Division: 31st, 32nd, 33rd Regt; 9th Armored Squadron; 15th & 48th Regiments Air support: (South Vietnam) RVN Air Force (United States) US Air Force (United States) US Navy

Casualties and losses
US estimate: 10,000 killed and 15,000 wounded 36 tanks lost Vietnamese figures: ~2,000 killed and 5,000 wounded ~40 tanks/APCs destroyed	(South Vietnam) 2,280 killed, 2,091 missing, 8,564 wounded 38 tanks/APCs, 32 howitzers; 2 C-123s, 3 A-1s and 14 helicopters destroyed (United States) 2 C-123s, 1 A-37, 1 AC-119, 3 AH-1 Cobras destroyed

The Battle of An Lộc was a major battle of the Vietnam War that lasted for 66 days and culminated in a victory for South Vietnam. The struggle for An Lộc in 1972 was an important battle of the war, as South Vietnamese forces halted the North Vietnamese advance towards Saigon capital. This fighting which ensued became the most protracted conflict of the 1972 Easter Offensive.

During the first month of the battle, the Army of the Republic of Vietnam (ARVN) 5th Division was outnumbered by a combined force consisting of three People's Army of Vietnam (PAVN) and Viet Cong (VC) divisions. The An Lộc defenders were later reinforced by the elite 81st Airborne Commando and the 1st Airborne Brigade, brought in by air after failing to pass the PAVN block at Tàu Ô. Other reinforcement was the 21st Division, which was plagued by a very slow move from the Mekong Delta and cleared QL-13 after protracted fighting.

== Background ==
An Lộc is the capital of Bình Long Province located northwest of Military Region III. During Easter Offensive 1972, An Lộc was at the centre of the PAVN's Nguyễn Huệ campaign, its location on Route 13 (QL-13) near Base Area 708 in Cambodia allowed safeguarding supplies based out of a "neutral" location in order to reduce exposure to US bombing. To protect this critical area, the ARVN had essentially a single division, the 5th Division covering Bình Long and Phước Long Provinces.

To facilitate command and organization, the High Command of the Liberation Army of South Vietnam established the Headquarters of Group 301 to directly command the Nguyễn Huệ campaign along the primary axis of Lộc Ninh – Bình Long – Route 13. The headquarters comprised: Lieu. Gen. Trần Văn Trà as Commander cum commissar; Col. Đồng Văn Cống as Deputy commander, Col. Trần Văn Phác as Deputy commissar, Col. Lê Ngọc Hiền as Chief of Staff, and Col. Bùi Phùng as Chief of Logistics.

On the same day that Lộc Ninh, a small town 20 miles (32 km) north of An Lộc on the border with Cambodia was assaulted by the PAVN 5th Division under commander Bùi Thanh Vân, Tàu Ô bridge - a key bridge on QL-13, 15km south of An Lộc was also blockaded by the PAVN 7th Division under commander Đàm Văn Ngụy, cutting off An Lộc from Saigon, roughly 90 miles (140 km) to the south. This prevented resupply by road of ARVN forces in An Lộc battle. Lieu. Gen. Nguyễn Văn Minh, commander of III Corps responded by helilifting the 5th Division headquarter with its commander, Brig. Gen. Lê Văn Hưng and two battalions of the 3rd Ranger Group into An Lộc.

On 7 April, Minh reported to the National Security Council about the equivalent of four PAVN divisions in his Corps area, and demanded more troops to protect the road to Saigon. Later in the day, the Council decided to assign the 21st Division from IV Corps as well as the 1st Airborne Brigade from JGS reserve to him. Around 16:40, Lộc Ninh was overrun by the PAVN 5th Division, just a few hundreds of Lộc Ninh defenders - the 9/5 Regiment could escape to An Lộc. That evening, elements of the PAVN 9th Division under commander Nguyễn Thới Bưng, overran Quản Lợi Base Camp, forced its defenders - the 7/5 Regiment destroyed their heavy equipment and fall back to An Lộc. Since then, the PAVN used Quản Lợi as a staging base for units coming in from Cambodia to join the siege of An Lộc.

Meanwhile, Task Force 52 (consisted of 1/48th and 2/52nd Battalions from the 18th Division) abandoned their twin fire bases near the junction of QL-13 and LTL-17, destroyed their heavy equipment, broke the PAVN encirclement and moved southward on foot through the jungle to An Lộc. TF52 withdrawal completed at 11:00 8 April with the remaining wounded ARVN troops and American advisors airlifted to medical facilities in Saigon, ~500 left from the original 1,000 troops force joined An Lộc defenders.

== Prelude ==
On 8 April, the 1st Airborne Brigade attempted to push north from Lai Khê to Chơn Thành by road, but was stopped at Tàu Ô bridge, only 6 kilometers north of Chơn Thành by solid entrenched blocking positions of a regiment of the PAVN 7th Division along QL-13. With the loss of Quản Lợi airstrip and the blocking of QL-13, An Lộc was isolated from outside, the two-month-long siege began.

On 11 April, the whole 21st Division arrived Lai Khê on trucks. With this reinforcement, III Corps could deploy the 8th Regiment of the 5th Division into An Lộc. The deployment of the 8/5 Regiment was completed on 12 April by helicopters.

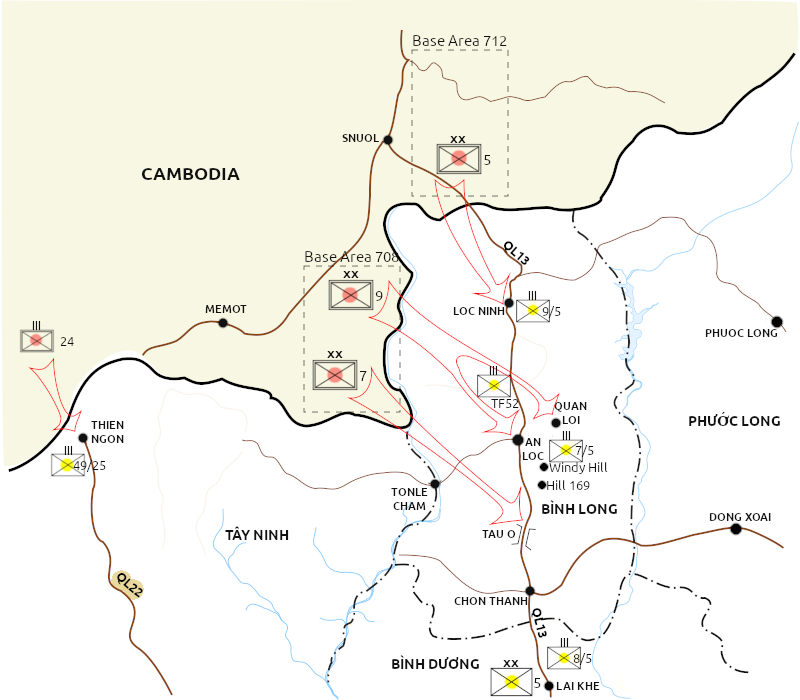
Bình Long dispositions in Easter 1972 - early April

Till 12 April, the ARVN defenders of An Lộc were made up of the 5th Division ~3,150 men, including its fresh 8th Regiment, the 7th Regiment short one battalion, the exhausted 9th Regiment; Task Force 52 ~500 men; the 3rd Ranger Group ~1,300 men; plus Col. Trần Văn Nhựt's Bình Long Regional Force (RF), Popular Forces (PF) and People's Self-Defense Forces (PSDF) ~2,000 men. In addition to the two 105mm howitzers organic to Bình Long Sector, the An Lộc was supported by the 51st Artillery Battalion and one 155mm howitzer battery.

== Battle ==
The first attack on the city occurred on 13 April and was preceded by a powerful artillery barrage. The PAVN 9th Division with armoured spearheads attacked on northwestern and northern positions held by the 5th Division. The PAVN overwhelming forces quickly pushed the ARVN defenders back to the southern half of the city before being halted by massive airstrikes of B-52. During the first few hours of fighting, the defenders used M72 LAW quite effectively. News of the first tank kill carried out by a RF soldier quickly spread, then cleared the long-established fear of PAVN tanks among the defenders. Lacking of experience for combined tanks, B2 Front commanders left their tanks penetrated the defensive perimeter without accompanying infantry. Gen. Hưng later ordered tank-destroying teams be formed by each battalion, which included PSDF members who knew the local terrain and could help identify strategic locations to ambush tanks.

While the PAVN was launching their first attack, ARVN press dissminated the news of dropping airborne commandos in north of Quản Lợi during the early morning of the following day, to capture Gen. Trà and other COSVN key members based there. In fact, Col. Lê Quang Lưỡng's 1st Airborne Brigade landed at Windy Hill (Vietnamese: Đồi Gió) and Hill 169 area, 2km south of Quản Lợi during the 14th afternoon and 15th morning with minor incidents. The next afternoon, the 81st Commando Group of Lt. Col. Phan Văn Huấn with 550 combat troops was also heli-lifted at Windy Hill.

15 April saw the second attack on the city as the PAVN were concerned that the airborne units at Windy Hill would soon join forces with the defenders. Again the PAVN preceded their attack with an artillery barrage followed by a tank-infantry attack. Like before, their tanks became separated from their infantry and fell prey to ARVN anti-tank weapons. PAVN infantry followed behind the tank deployment, assaulted the ARVN defensive positions, and pushed farther into the city. B-52 strikes helped break up some PAVN units assembling for the attack. This engagement lasted until tapering off on the afternoon of 16 April.

Unable to take the city, the PAVN kept it under constant artillery fire. They also moved in more anti-aircraft guns to prevent aerial resupply. Heavy anti-aircraft fire kept VNAF helicopters from getting into the city after 12 April. In response, fixed wing VNAF aircraft (C-123s and C-119s) made attempts, but after suffering losses, the USAF took over on 19 April. The USAF used C-130s to parachute in supplies, but many missed the defenders and several aircraft were shot down or damaged. Low altitude drops during day and night did not do the job, so by 2 May, the USAF began using High Altitude Low Opening (HALO) techniques. With far greater success, this method of resupply was utilized until 25 June, when the siege was lifted and aircraft could land at An Lộc.

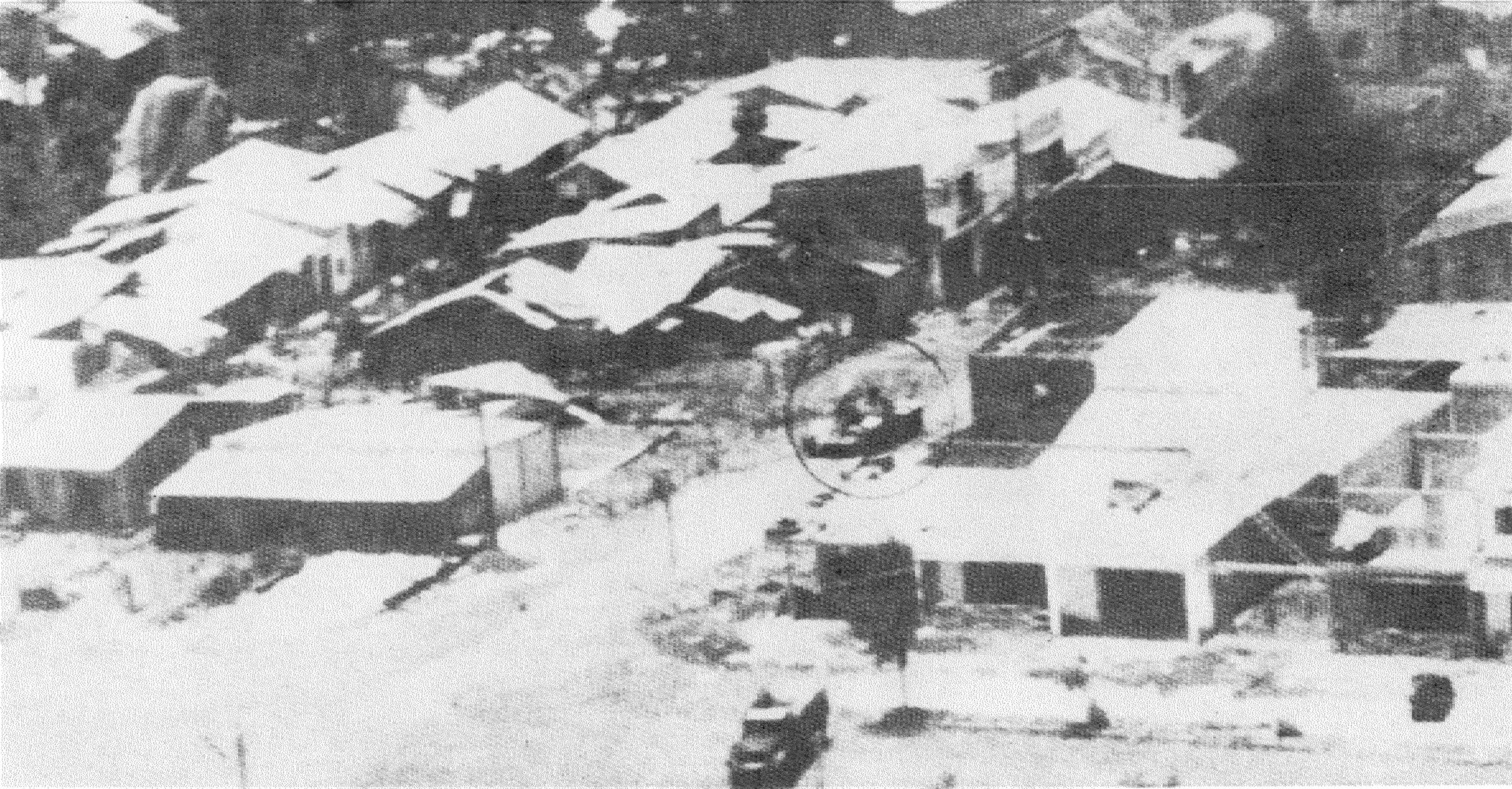
PAVN T-54 tanks destroyed in An Lộc

After making slow progress, on 22 April the 32nd Regiment encountered a roadblock of the PAVN 101st Regiment 15 km north of Lai Khê. From 24 April the division engaged the PAVN in a two-pronged attack to clear the road with the 32nd Regiment attacking from the north and the 33rd Regiment attacking from the south. These attacks eventually forced the 101st Regiment to withdraw west on 27 April, leaving one battalion to cover the withdrawal for a further two days. The 31st Regiment was then lifted by helicopters to 6 km north of Chơn Thành where it fought the PAVN 165th Regiment, 7th Division, later reinforced by the 209th Regiment, for the next 13 days.

On 11 May the PAVN launched a massive all-out infantry and armor (T-54 medium tanks) assault on An Lộc. The attack was carried out by units of the 5th and 9th divisions. This attack was repulsed by a combination of US airpower and the determined stand of ARVN soldiers on the ground. Almost every B-52 in Southeast Asia was called in to strike the massing enemy tanks and infantry. The commander of the defending forces had placed a grid around the town creating many "boxes", each measuring 1 km by 3 km in size, which were given a number and could be called by ground forces at any time. The B-52 cells (groups of three aircraft) were guided onto these boxes by ground-based radar. During 11 and 12 May, the USAF managed a B-52 mission every 55 minutes for 30 hours straight—using 170 B-52s and smashing whole regiments of PAVN in the process. Despite this air support, the PAVN made gains, and were within a few hundred meters of the ARVN 5th Division command post. ARVN counter-attacks were able to stabilize the situation. By the night of 11 May, the PAVN consolidated their gains. During that day an A-37B piloted by First lieutenant Michael Blassie was shot down while providing air support, his body was recovered in late 1972 and he was separated from the identification documents recovered leading to him being later designated as the unknown service member from the Vietnam War buried at the Tomb of the Unknown Soldier at Arlington National Cemetery.

On 12 May the PAVN launched new attacks in an effort to take the city, but again failed. The PAVN launched one more attack on 19 May in honor of Ho Chi Minh's birthday. The defenders were not surprised, and the attack was broken up by US air support and an ambush by the ARVN paratroopers.

An Lộc June 16, from left to right: Lt. Gen. Nguyễn Văn Minh (III Corps), Bri. Gen. Lê Văn Hưng (5th Infantry Division), Col. Lê Quang Lưỡng (1st Airborne Brigade), and Col. Trần Văn Nhựt (Bình Long sector)

On 13 May with intensive air support the 31st Regiment finally overran the PAVN positions and extended ARVN control to 8 km north of Chơn Thành. The 32nd Regiment then deployed into the Tàu Ô area (11.514°N 106.614°E) a further 5 km north, where they ran into the 209th Regiment's well-prepared blocking positions, which stopped the division's advance for 38 days despite extensive artillery and air support, including B-52 strikes. This stalemate would continue until the PAVN withdrew from An Lộc. On 15 May a task force of the 15th Regiment, 9th Division, which was redeployed from the Mekong Delta, and the 9th Armored Cavalry Squadron, 21st Division moved north, east of QL-13 bypassing the Tàu Ô roadblock to establish a fire support base at Tan Khai (11.55°N 106.616°E) 10 km south of An Lộc. On 20 May the PAVN 141st Regiment attacked the base at Tan Khai and continued attacking unsuccessfully for three days against a determined defense before withdrawing.

On 13/14 June, a regiment of the 18th Division was landed in An Lộc to reinforce the exhausted 5th Division. On 17 June, the 48th Regiment of the 18th Division reoccupied Hill 169, allowing them to guide air and artillery strikes on PAVN forces. By 18 June 1972, the III Corps commander declared the siege was over and released the 1st Airborne Brigade to its parent unit. Despite this declaration, An Lộc remained under PAVN artillery fire, on 9 July Third [Military] Regional Assistance Command (TRAC) deputy commander Brig. Gen. Richard J. Tallman and his aides had just landed at An Lộc when they were hit by PAVN artillery fire, three of the group were killed instantly, while Tallman and two others were wounded. The wounded men were evacuated to the 3rd Field Hospital in Saigon where Tallman died of his wounds. He was the last US Army general to die in South Vietnam.

The victory, however, was not complete. QL-13 still was not open. On 11 July the entire 18th Division arrived at An Lộc to replace the 5th Division. In mid-July the 21st Division was replaced by the 25th Division and it completed the destruction of the remaining PAVN strongpoints at Tàu Ô by 20 July.

== Aftermath ==
The 18th Division would spread out from An Lộc and push the PAVN back, increasing control in the area.

On 8 August the 18th Division launched an assault to retake Quản Lợi, but was stopped by the PAVN in the base's reinforced concrete bunkers. A second attack was launched on 9 August with limited gains. Attacks on the base continued for two weeks; eventually one third of the base was captured. Finally, the ARVN attacked the PAVN-occupied bunkers with TOW missiles and M-202 rockets, breaking the PAVN defense and forcing the remaining defenders to flee the base.

The fighting at An Lộc demonstrated the continued ARVN dependence on US air power and US advisors. For the PAVN, it demonstrated their logistical constraints; following each attack, resupply times caused lengthy delays in their ability to properly defend their position.

== Analysis ==
The ARVN defenders did have one card to play throughout the battle: the immense power of air support – the use of United States Air Force (USAF) B-52 Stratofortress bombers in a close support tactical role, as well as AC-119 Stinger and AC-130E Spectre gunships, fixed wing cargo aircraft of varying sizes, AH-1 Cobra attack helicopters and Republic of Vietnam Air Force (VNAF) A-37s. These methods worked to blunt the PAVN offensive. At this stage in the war, the PAVN often attacked with PT-76 amphibious and T-54 medium tanks spearheading the advance, usually preceded by a massive artillery barrage. These tactics reflected Soviet doctrine, as the PAVN had been supplied with Soviet and Chinese Communist equipment, including jets, artillery, and surface-to-air missiles since the beginning of the war. The battle eventually stagnated and became a periodic trade of artillery barrages. This was most probably a result of casualties sustained in the frustrated attacks on heavily entrenched enemy positions in control of a withering array of supporting firepower.

== See also ==
- Second Battle of Quảng Trị
- Battle of Kontum
