= Bình Long (town) =

- District-level town (Class-4)
- Bình Long Town; Thị xã Bình Long
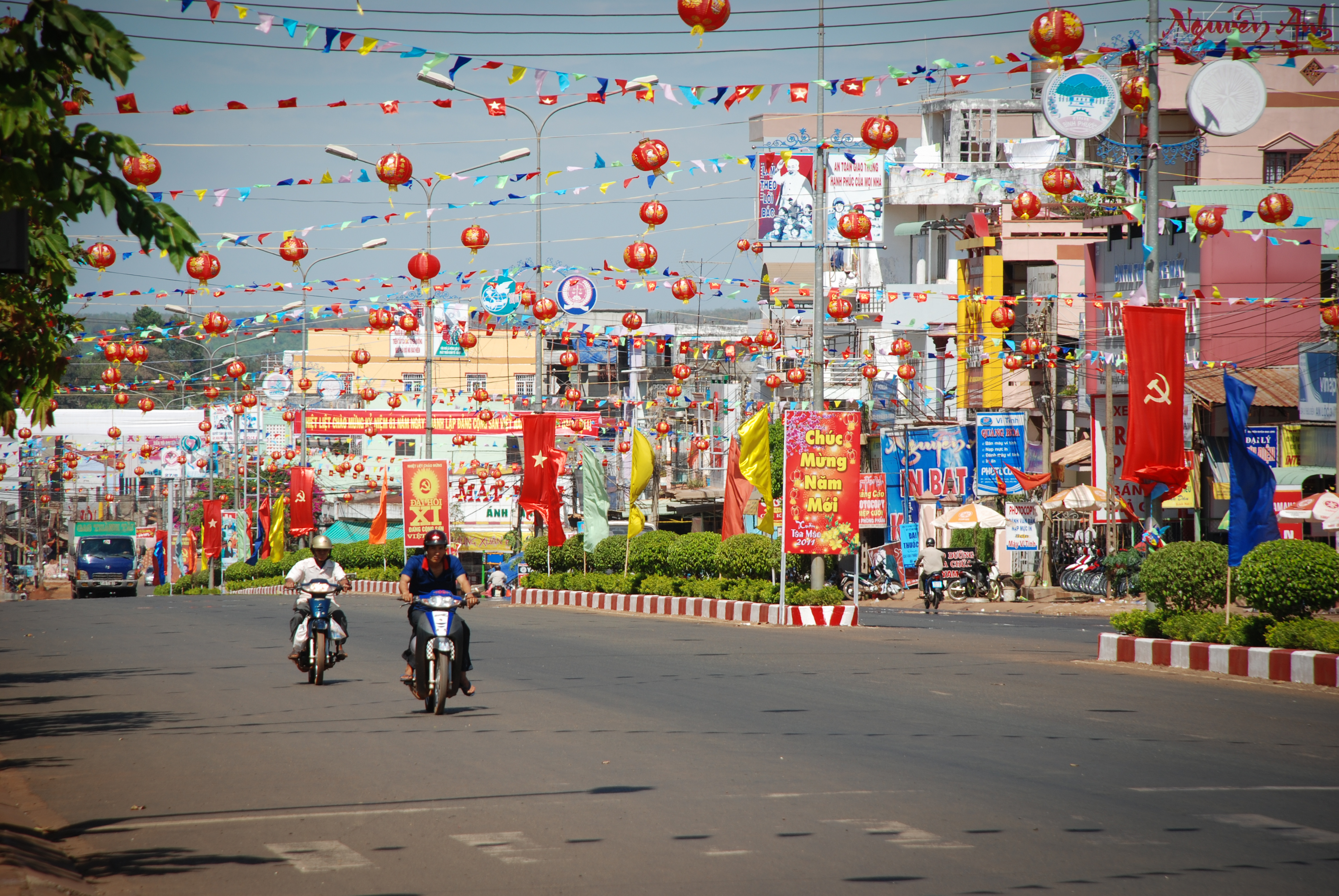

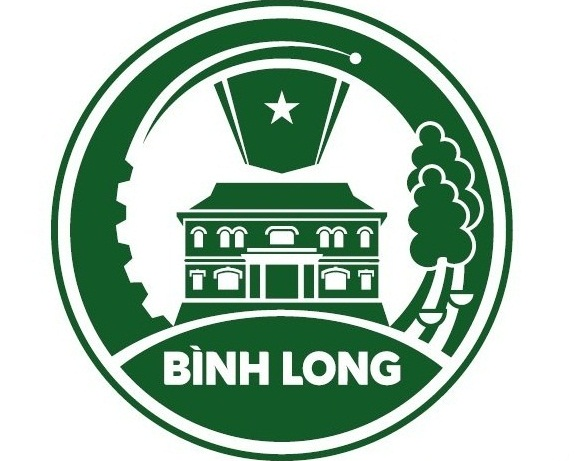
- Seal
- Interactive map of Bình Long
- Location within Vietnam Location within Southeast Asia Location within Asia
- Coordinates: 11°41′13″N 106°35′47″E
- Country: Vietnam
- Region: Southeast
- Province: Bình Phước

Area
  - Total: 48.76 sq mi (126.28 km^{2})

Population (2018)
  - Total: 105,520
  - Density: 2,164.2/sq mi (835.60/km^{2})
- Time zone: UTC+7 (Indochina Time)
- Website: binhlong.binhphuoc.gov.vn

Bình Long is a former town of Bình Phước Province in the Southeast region of Vietnam. As of 2018, the district had a population of 105.520 and an area of 126.28 km^{2}. The district capital lies at An Lộc ward.

The town's former name is An Lộc. It is located approximately 90 km north of Ho Chi Minh City with a population of 8,599 (2009). An Lộc was formerly part of Bình Long Province before the merger with Phước Long Province to form Bình Phước Province. It became famous during the Vietnam War for being the location of the Battle of An Lộc in 1972. Today Bình Long has a mass grave memorial with 3,000 bodies.

== Geographical location ==
Bình Long borders Hớn Quản District to the east, west, and south, and Lộc Ninh District to the north.

== Administrative division ==
Bình Long consists of four wards (phường) and two communes (xã):

- Wards: An Lộc, Hưng Chiến, Phú Thịnh, Phú Đức
- Communes: Thanh Lương, Thanh Phú

== In popular culture ==
- An Lộc is mentioned in the epilogue of American Graffiti, which states that "Terry 'Toad' Fields was reported missing in action near An Lộc in December 1965." This is later expanded upon in the sequel, More American Graffiti.
- An Lộc is also mentioned in Good Morning, Vietnam, as Sgt Major Dickerson requests activity on the road to An Lộc for the trip that Adrian Cronauer (Robin Williams) and Edward Garlick (Forest Whitaker) are taking to supposedly "interview" troops in the field.
- Ba-Nee, one of the Starlight Girls in Jem, is said to have been born in An Lộc.

== See also ==
- South Vietnam
