= Battle of Loc Ninh =

1972 battle of the Vietnam War

Battle of Lộc Ninh
- Part of the Vietnam War
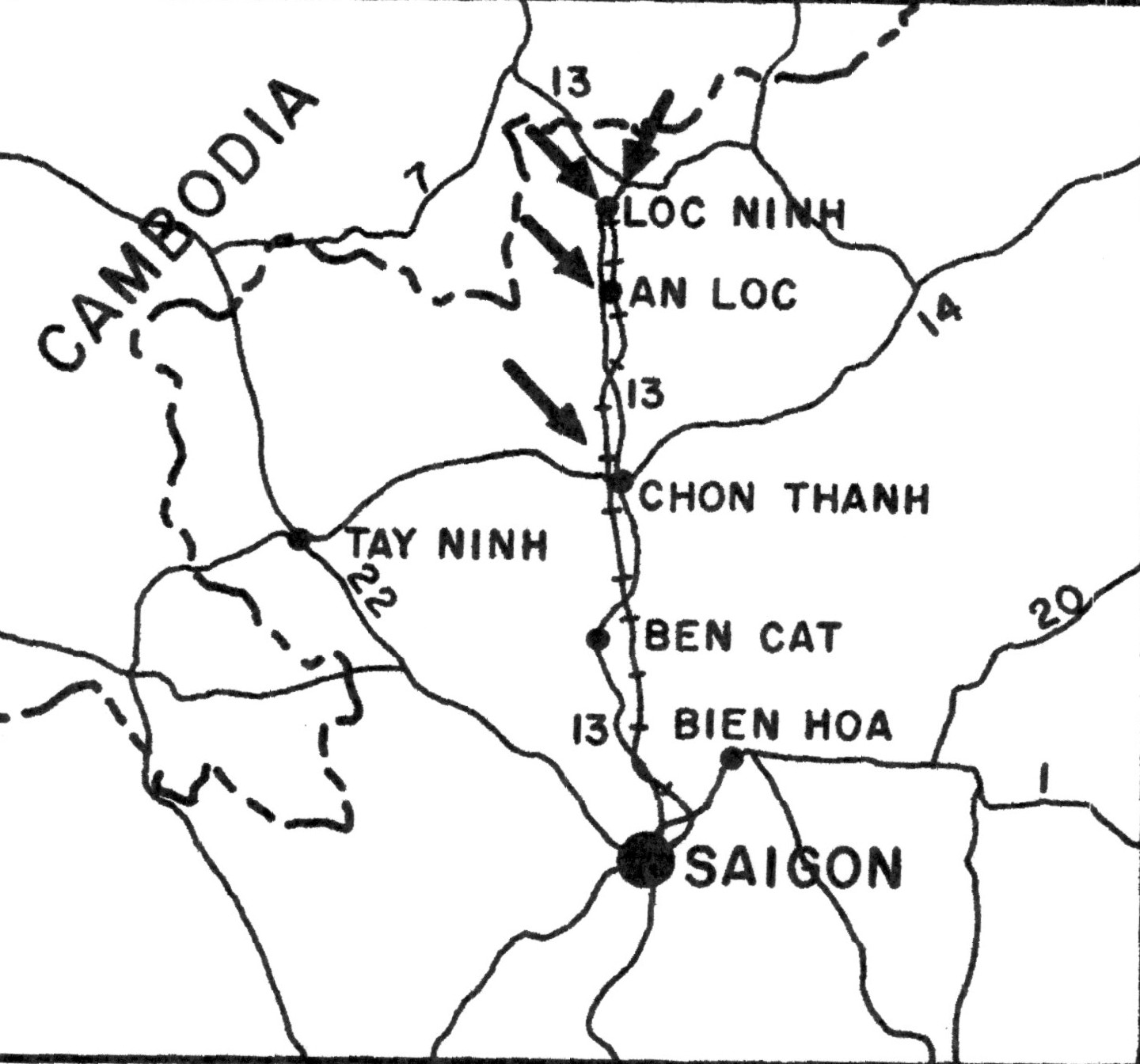
- Movements of Communist forces in Bình Long in 1972.
Date	4–7 April 1972
Location	Lộc Ninh, Bình Long Province (now Bình Phước Province), South Vietnam 11°50′5.64″N 106°35′15.72″E
Result	Viet Cong–North Vietnamese victory

Belligerents
South Vietnam; United States	(Provisional Revolutionary Government of the Republic of South Vietnam) Viet Cong; North Vietnam

Commanders and leaders
(South Vietnam) Nguyen Cong Vinh (United States) Richard R. Schott (United States) Mark A. Smith	(Provisional Revolutionary Government of the Republic of South Vietnam) Hoàng Văn Thái (Provisional Revolutionary Government of the Republic of South Vietnam) Trần Văn Trà

Strength
(South Vietnam) Regular Force: About 2,000; Local militia: ~2.000 (United States) Air support and advisors to direct strikes	About 13,800

Casualties and losses
Nearly 2,000 South Vietnamese soldiers killed or wounded 1,876 captured (only about 50 soldiers actually reached An Lộc); 7 American advisers captured (later released); 18 M-41 tanks and 31 M113 APCs destroyed, 17 M-41 tanks and 32 trucks captured 8 Self-propelled guns destroyed 8 helicopters destroyed.	~1,000 North Vietnamese soldiers killed or wounded 2 T-54 and 1 PT-76 tanks destroyed

The Battle of Lộc Ninh was a major battle of the Vietnam War fought during the Easter Offensive, which took place in Bình Long Province, South Vietnam between 4 and 7 April 1972. Towards the end of 1971, North Vietnamese leaders decided to launch a major offensive against South Vietnam, with the objective of destroying Army of the Republic of Vietnam (ARVN) units and capturing as much territory as possible, in order to strengthen their bargaining position in the Paris Peace Accords. On 30 March 1972, two People's Army of Vietnam (PAVN) divisions smashed through the Vietnamese Demilitarized Zone, marking the commencement of the Easter Offensive. They quickly overwhelmed South Vietnamese units in the I Corps Tactical Zone. With the rapid collapse of South Vietnamese forces in the northern provinces of South Vietnam, PAVN and Viet Cong (VC) forces began preparing for their next offensive, targeting Bình Long Province in the rubber plantation region north of Saigon. On 4 April, the VC 5th Division opened their attack on Lộc Ninh, defended by the ARVN 9th Infantry Regiment. After three days of fighting, the vastly outnumbered ARVN forces, though well supported by American air power, were forced to abandon their positions in Lộc Ninh.

== Background ==
In December 1971, following the defeat of South Vietnamese forces during Operation Lam Son 719, North Vietnamese leadership in Hanoi decided to launch a major military offensive against South Vietnam. In what became known as the Easter Offensive, the combined PAVN and VC forces employed combined arms tactics using heavy weapons that were a radical departure from the low-intensity guerrilla warfare of previous years. Although North Vietnam eventually used the equivalent of 14 army divisions, its leaders did not seek to win the war outright. Rather, their objective was to gain as much territory and destroy as many units of the South Vietnamese military as possible, in order to strengthen their bargaining position at the Paris Peace Talks.

The Easter Offensive began on 30 March 1972, when the PAVN 304th and 308th Divisions drove across the Demilitarized Zone and attacked ARVN positions in the I Corps Tactical Zone, which consisted of South Vietnam's northernmost provinces. Caught by surprise, ARVN General Vũ Văn Giai ordered his newly created 3rd Infantry Division to withdraw towards the Cua Viet River, where it could reorganize.

On 2 April, ARVN Colonel Pham Van Dinh surrendered his 56th Infantry Regiment at Camp Carroll, which enabled the PAVN to take the former American fire base without a fight. Quảng Trị City was captured by the PAVN on 28 April, following several counterattacks by ARVN units around Đông Hà.

With the northern provinces of South Vietnam under their control, PAVN forces turned their attention to the Cambodian border region north of Saigon, which formed part of the ARVN III Corps Tactical Zone. During the offensive, the objective of the PAVN/VC in the zone was the capture of An Lộc, capital of Bình Long Province. The VC committed three infantry divisions to the mission (5th, 7th and 9th Divisions). PAVN forces comprised one artillery formation (69th Artillery Command), one armored regiment (203rd Armored Regiment), two independent regiments (205th and 101st Regiment), and one sapper unit (429th Sapper Group). The VC 5th Division was to initiate the offensive by taking Lộc Ninh, while the 9th Division was assigned to An Lộc. The 7th Division was ordered to block National Highway 13 to prevent reinforcements from reaching An Lộc.

== Prelude ==
In late December 1971, ARVN intelligence in the III Corps had detected the buildup of PAVN/VC formations across the border in neighbouring Cambodia. Even though it was obvious that preparations for a major offensive were under way, ARVN commanders were unable to predict the PAVN/VC's intentions. In January 1972, the VC 5th Division was reported to have taken up positions in Snuol, a Cambodian city located about 30 kilometres (19 mi) west of Lộc Ninh. South Vietnamese intelligence also detected the presence of the VC 7th and 9th Divisions in Dambe and Chup respectively. Between January and May 1971, the ARVN mounted Operation Toan Thang TT02, with the aim of destroying VC main force divisions based in Cambodia, specifically in the Snuol area. But due to the death of General Đỗ Cao Trí, the commander of III Corps, in a helicopter accident, the ARVN were forced to retreat from Snuol without achieving their objective.

In February and March 1972, ARVN units patrolling the border with Cambodia detected increased PAVN/VC activity in the Fishhook area, most notably the presence of the VC 5th Division in an area north of Bình Long Province. On 13 March, an ARVN mechanized task force operating in Cambodia discovered a huge depot that contained large quantities of assault rifles, machine guns, rockets, anti-aircraft guns and ammunition in Base Area 354 (Svay Rieng Province) and Base Area 708 (Kampong Cham Province). On 27 March, a VC deserter from a reconnaissance company of the 7th Division revealed that his unit was surveying a portion of road between Tây Ninh and Bình Long in preparation for its next move. Between 27 March and 1 April, more enemy prisoners and documents were captured by the ARVN, which revealed that the VC 7th and 9th Divisions were coordinating their efforts against an unidentified target.

The movements of PAVN/VC forces near the Cambodian-South Vietnamese border during the first three months of 1972 clearly indicated that a major offensive was in the making. However, the whereabouts of the next thrust was the topic that concerned South Vietnamese and U.S. intelligence officers the most. In previous offensives, the PAVN/VC had used Tây Ninh as an invasion route, as it was surrounded by VC bases in War zone C, the Iron Triangle and the Parrot's Beak, Cambodia. South Vietnamese and U.S. military intelligence reached a consensus that Tây Ninh would be the next target for the Easter Offensive. To reinforce that perception, on 2 April, the VC 24th Independent Regiment overran Fire Support Base Lac Long, defended by elements of the ARVN 49th Infantry Regiment, 5th Infantry Division, about 35 kilometres (22 mi) northwest of Tây Ninh.

The attacks on Lac Long and other outposts in Tây Ninh were a diversion designed to cover the main thrust into Bình Long Province. To initiate the campaign in Bình Long, the VC 5th Division (numbering about 9,230 soldiers) was ordered to take Lộc Ninh, Bình Long's northernmost town. The VC were supported by the PAVN 69th Artillery Command (3,830 soldiers) and the 203rd Armored Regiment (800 soldiers). In 1972, Lộc Ninh was a small district town situated on Route 13, home to about 4,000 people, mostly members of the various Montagnard tribes. The task of defending Lộc Ninh was entrusted to the ARVN 9th Infantry Regiment, 5th Infantry Division, commanded by Colonel Nguyễn Công Vinh. It was supported by the 1st Cavalry Squadron, 1st Regional Force Battalion and elements of the 74th Ranger Battalion.

Prior to the battle, the 9th Infantry Regiment had occupied the former U.S. Special Forces compound at the south end of the airfield, which was about 0.8 kilometres (0.50 mi) west of the district center. The district headquarters was defended by more than 200 Regional Forces soldiers, who operated from a Japanese-built fortified bunker system located north of the airfield. To assist the 9th Infantry Regiment, the U.S. military provided seven advisers. The U.S. advisory team at 9th Regimental Headquarters was led by Lieutenant Colonel Richard R. Schott, who was assisted by Major Albert E. Carlson and Captain Mark A. Smith, and two communication specialists, Sergeant First Class Howard B. Hull and Sergeant Kenneth Wallingford. Additionally, Captain George Wanat and Major Thomas Davidson operated from the north end of the airfield, attached to the district headquarters.

== Fall of Lộc Ninh ==
From the beginning of April, there was a sharp increase in VC activity along National Highway 13, which connects Bình Long Province with Saigon. Between 3–4 April, Regional Force units clashed several times with the VC, resulting in more than twenty VC fatalities. Also, the French owner of the Cexso Rubber Plantation in Lộc Ninh reported to the ARVN that the VC had established field telephone lines northwest of the district. However, ARVN Colonel Colonel Nguyễn Công Vinh was reluctant to send reconnaissance patrols to that area. On 4 April, the ARVN 9th Reconnaissance Company operating west of Lộc Ninh was destroyed when it came into contact with elements of the VC main force units. On the same evening, the 3rd Battalion, ARVN 9th Infantry Regiment captured two soldiers during an ambush operation. The prisoners revealed that they were from the 272nd Regiment, 9th Division, and that their unit was moving south to prepare for an assault on An Lộc.

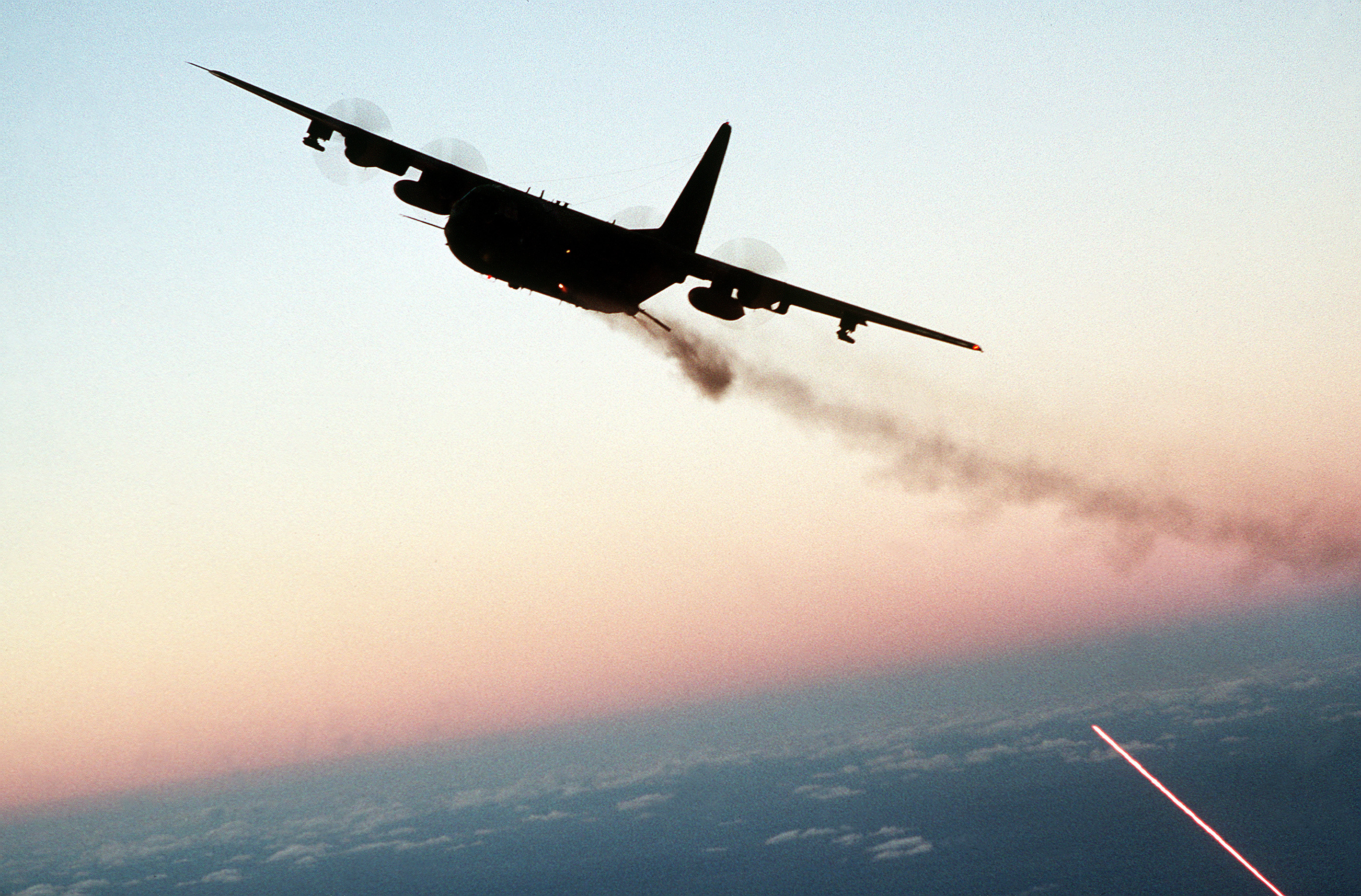
AC-130 Spectres were highly effective during the battle.

At around 06:50 on 5 April, the VC 5th Division moved across the Cambodian border to stage the main attack on Lộc Ninh. The VC assault opened with a heavy barrage of artillery, rocket and mortar fire targeting the headquarters of the ARVN 9th Infantry Regiment and the Lộc Ninh district compound. The VC simultaneously mounted other attacks throughout the ARVN 5th Infantry Division's areas of operations in Lai Khê and Quản Lợi. There was also indirect fire on ARVN positions in Phước Long Province, mainly targeting Phước Vinh, Sông Bé, and Bo Duc. Following the artillery barrage, VC infantry, supported by about 25 tanks, attacked Lộc Ninh from the west. In the initial assault, they tried to overrun the ARVN regimental compound located at the south end of the airstrip. Despite the ferocity of the onslaught, ARVN soldiers held their ground and fought desperately to hold the enemy at bay; ARVN artillerymen lowered the muzzles of their 105 mm howitzers and fired directly at enemy infantry formations moving through the rubber trees.

Even though the situation was stabilized, the ARVN were forced to retreat into small compounds at the north and south ends of the town. The intensity of the attack on Lộc Ninh revealed the true intentions of the PAVN/VC; ARVN Lieutenant General Nguyễn Văn Minh, commander of the III Corps and his American advisor Major General James F. Hollingsworth realized that Bình Long, not Tây Ninh, would be the focus of the offensive. In order to halt the advance, Minh and Hollingsworth directed all available tactical support aircraft towards Lộc Ninh. Almost immediately, Republic of Vietnam Air Force (RVNAF) F-5 and A-1 fighter-bombers, United States Air Force (USAF) A-37s from the 8th Special Operations Squadron based at Bien Hoa Air Base, attack aircraft from the aircraft carrier USS Constellation, and USAF F-4 and AC-130 aircraft from Thailand began flying over the skies of Lộc Ninh. U.S. and South Vietnamese tactical support aircraft were directed against VC and PAVN formations by American advisers on the ground. As the fighting intensified, Colonel Nguyễn Công Vinh ordered the 1st Cavalry Squadron—commanded by Lieutenant Colonel Nguyen Huu Duong—to withdraw from Fire Support Base Alpha to reinforce Lộc Ninh. However, Duong refused, saying he would surrender his unit to the VC instead. Angered, Captain Mark A. Smith reportedly threatened to destroy the 1st Cavalry Squadron with American air power if the squadron didn't fight. From that point on, Smith virtually controlled the ARVN forces. A few moments later, elements of the ARVN 74th Ranger Battalion and the 3rd Battalion, ARVN 9th Infantry Regiment notified the regimental command post that they had broken out and were fighting their way back towards Lộc Ninh. Meanwhile, the 1st Cavalry Squadron began moving west towards the Cambodian border to engage the VC.

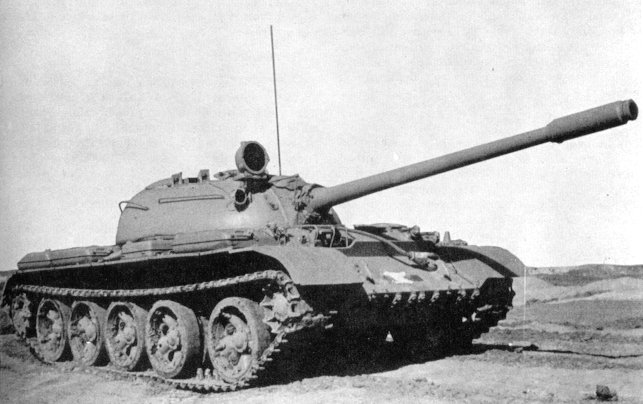
North Vietnamese T-54 tanks spearheaded many attacks in the battle

On the afternoon of 5 April, the VC 5th Division launched another major ground assault on Lộc Ninh from the west to try to break through the defenses of the southern compound. American AC-130 and AH-1 Cobra gunships stopped the VC formations in their tracks, as supporting PAVN tanks were either destroyed or forced to pull back. Despite having suffered many casualties as a result of U.S. air strikes, the VC continued their assaults well into the evening. In order to deal with the onslaught, Smith continued to direct the AC-130 against targets around Lộc Ninh. Vinh, on the other hand, was either planning to surrender or desert when he ordered two of his soldiers to open the gates of the command compound at around 22:00. Throughout the night, the PAVN 69th Artillery Command continued bombarding ARVN positions around Lộc Ninh, as the VC massed for another assault.

On the morning of 6 April, ARVN forces reported hearing the sound of tanks moving toward the southern end of the district airfield. At about 05:30, the VC launched another attack from southern Lộc Ninh, with the support of about 25 T-54 and PT-76 tanks. VC infantry initially managed to breach the ARVN lines, but the attack soon stalled, and neither side gained a clear advantage. In the afternoon, elements of the VC E6 Regiment forced their way through the compound gates, but air strikes from U.S. AC-130s stopped them from advancing any further. By that stage, however, the ARVN 9th Infantry Regiment had absorbed a significant number of casualties; it only had 50 soldiers left, while another 150 wounded were in the hospital bunker. The defenders in Lộc Ninh were cut off from outside help since heavy-calibre PAVN anti-aircraft guns effectively prevented resupply and medevac flights into the area.

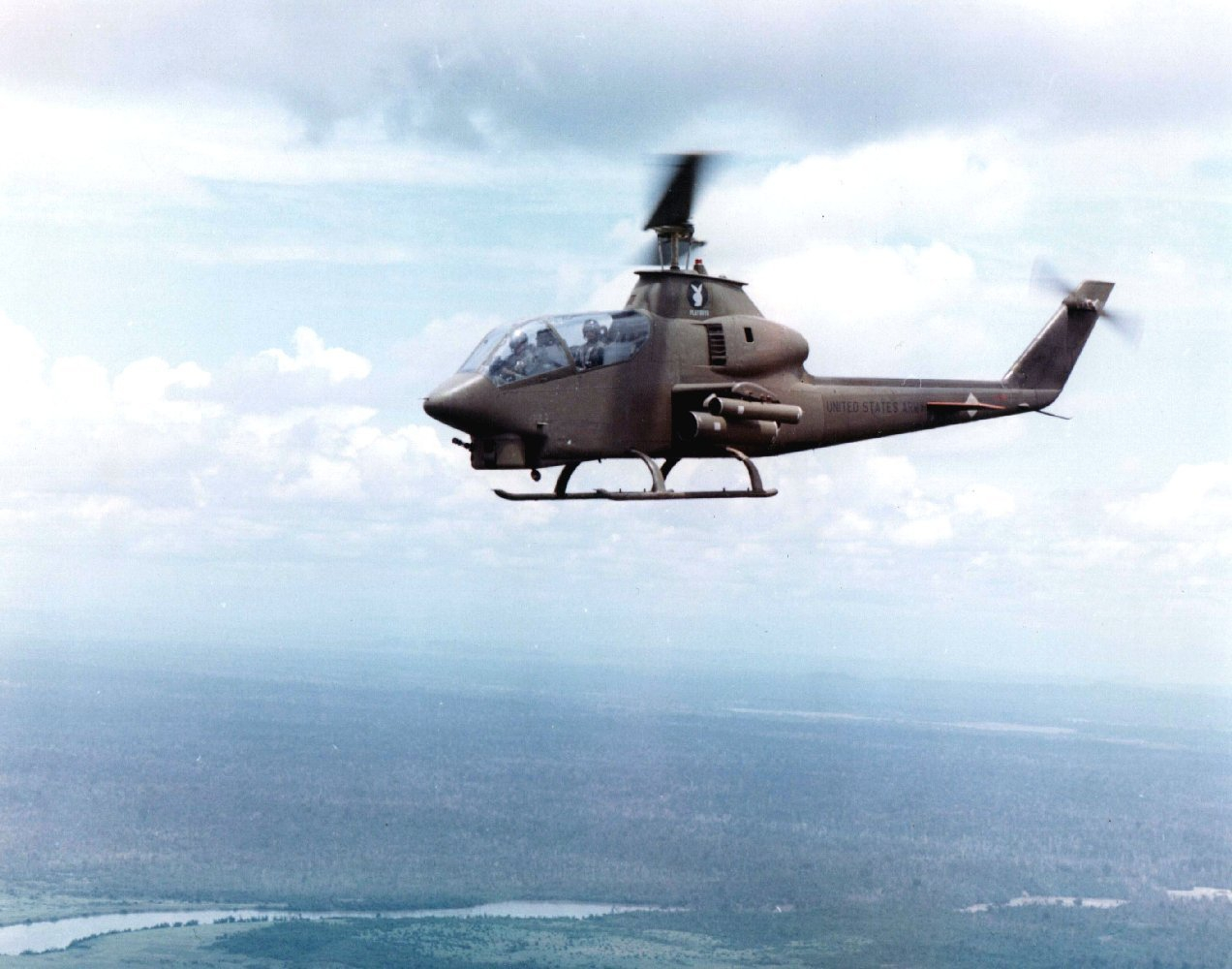
AH-1 Cobras were a threat to North Vietnamese armour in Lộc Ninh.

In an attempt to save Lộc Ninh, Brigadier General Lê Văn Hưng—commander of the ARVN 5th Infantry Division—ordered Task Force 52 to move north to reinforce the beleaguered 9th Infantry Regiment. Task Force 52 consisted of the 2nd Battalion, 52nd Infantry Regiment and the 1st Battalion, 48th Infantry Regiment; both units had been transferred from the ARVN 18th Infantry Division in late March to serve as a border screen for General Hưng's forces. Lieutenant Colonel Nguyễn Bá Thinh—commander of Task Force 52—ordered the 2nd Battalion to advance towards Lộc Ninh. The unit was ambushed at the junction of National Highway 13 and Route 17. Unable to withstand the VC's superior firepower, it was forced to withdraw. To prevent Task Force 52 from evacuating to either Lộc Ninh or An Lộc, the VC pursued Task Force 52 and bombarded their bases with heavy artillery throughout the day.

Meanwhile, on the afternoon of 6 April, the ARVN inside Lộc Ninh were slightly reinforced by the 3rd Battalion, ARVN 9th Infantry Regiment, along with the men of the 1st Cavalry Squadron at FSB Alpha who had refused to surrender. Furthermore, wounded ARVN soldiers who were still able to fight made their way back to the defensive perimeter to await the next wave of attacks. During the night, the compound descended into chaos when PAVN artillery scored a direct hit on the hospital bunker, killing a large number of wounded men. Later on, another round of rockets struck the artillery compound, striking the ammunition storage bunker, which exploded. From the eastern side of the district, the VC tried to penetrate the defense line at Lộc Ninh, but were beaten off. Realizing that the situation had become hopeless, Vinh took off his uniform and told his troops to surrender.

At 07:00 on 7 April, the VC massed for another ground assault from the north and west of Lộc Ninh, with support from heavy artillery, tanks and armored personnel carriers. As the VC closed in, Vinh and his bodyguards ran out the opened gate and surrendered. Several ARVN soldiers also tried to surrender, but they all returned to their positions after Smith stopped an ARVN officer from raising a white T-shirt up the flagpole. By 08:00 the ARVN 9th Infantry Regiment was completely overwhelmed when the VC overran the southern compound with their superior numbers. At around 10:00, all tactical air support was called off in order to clear the way for B-52 strikes against VC formations west of Lộc Ninh. However, the B-52 strikes could not prevent the VC from overrunning Lộc Ninh. By 16:30, the VC were in complete control of Lộc Ninh District.

== Aftermath ==
The fight cost both sides dearly. The true extent of PAVN/VC casualties is largely unknown, but due to their exposure to American firepower, they undoubtedly suffered heavy losses. Nonetheless, the successful capture of Lộc Ninh exceeded their expectations, as they had thought that the South Vietnamese would hold out longer. Lộc Ninh became the seat of the Provisional Revolutionary Government, the capital of "liberated" territories in South Vietnam. The South Vietnamese, in their efforts to hold the district, lost more than three thousand soldiers killed or captured; only about fifty soldiers actually reached An Lộc. The VC also captured all seven American advisers and an embedded French journalist, Yves-Michel Dumond, in Lộc Ninh; they were taken to a prison camp in Kratié Province, Cambodia. Dumond was released on 14 July 1972. On 12 February 1973, the Americans were released in accordance with the Paris Peace Accords.

As Lộc Ninh was succumbing, other PAVN/VC formations turned their attention to the provincial capital of An Lộc. At 09:00 on 7 April, Brigadier General Lê Văn Hưng ordered Task Force 52 to abandon its bases, destroy all heavy weapons and vehicles, and withdraw to An Lộc, following their failed attempt at reinforcing the 9th Infantry Regiment. As Task Force 52 tried to break through National Highway 13, they ran into another large VC ambush. It would take the soldiers of Task Force 52 about a week to reach An Lộc, infiltrating through PAVN/VC positions along the main road. Late on 7 April, the VC 9th Division attacked Quản Lợi Base Camp, just 3 kilometres (1.9 mi) north of An Lộc. Elements of the ARVN 7th Infantry Regiment defending the area were unable to hold off the VC, so they were ordered to destroy their equipment and join other ARVN units in the provincial capital. The next step in the offensive was the Battle of An Lộc.
