= List of honors and decorations of the 75th Ranger Regiment =

The 75th Ranger Regiment has been awarded numerous honors and decorations from its campaigns, beginning in World War II. In World War II, they participated in 16 major campaigns, spearheading the campaigns in Morocco, Sicily, Naples-Foggia, Anzio and Leyte. During the Vietnam War, they received campaign participation streamers for every campaign in the war.

The regiment received streamers with arrowheads (denoting conflicts they spearheaded) for its participation in the invasions of Grenada and Panama.

To date, the Rangers have earned six Presidential Unit Citations, nine Valorous Unit Awards, and four Meritorious Unit Commendation, the most recent of which were earned in Vietnam and Haditha, Iraq, respectively.

== Campaign participation credit ==
75th Ranger Regiment Distinctive Unit Insignia.

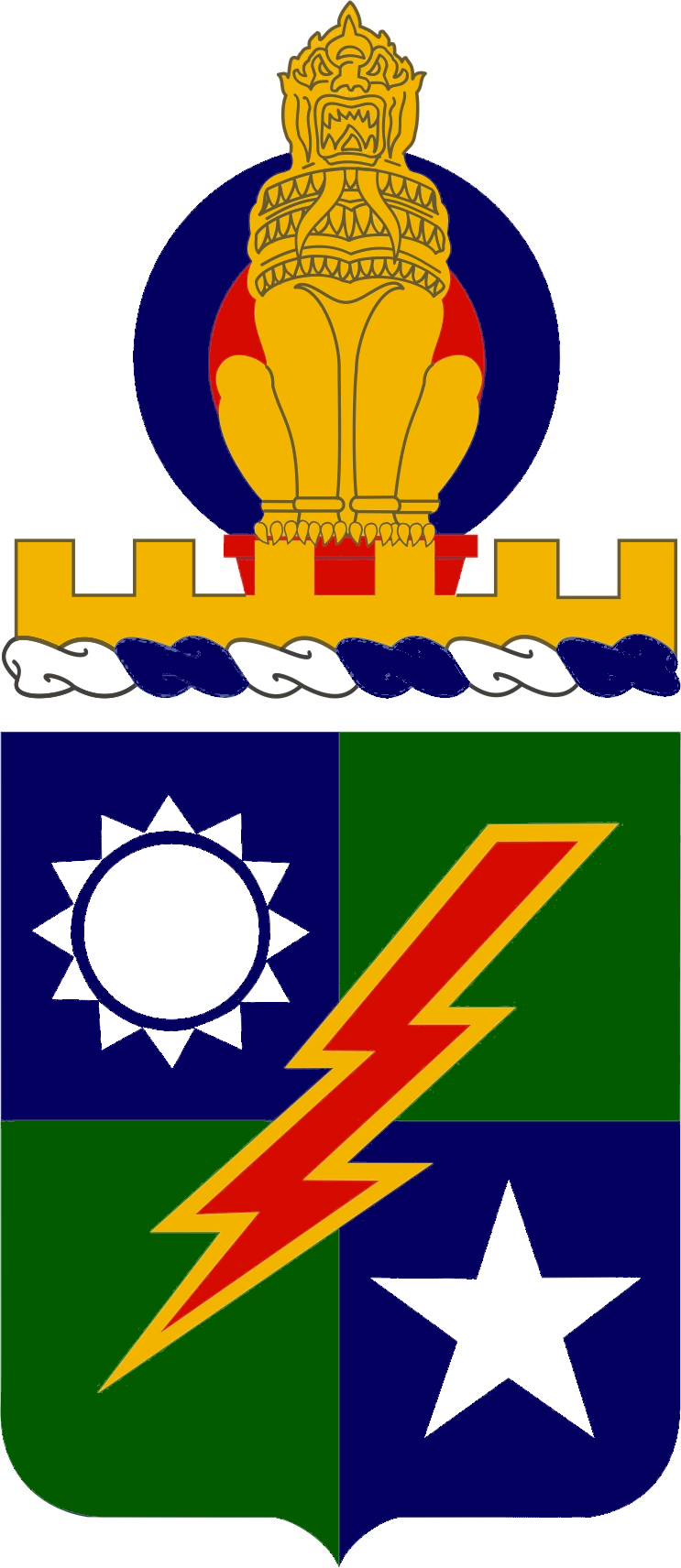
75th Ranger Regiment Coat of Arms.

World War II

- European African Middle East Campaign
  - Algeria-French Morocco (with)
  - Tunisia
  - Sicily (with)
  - Naples-Foggia (with)
  - Anzio (with)
  - Rome-Arno
  - Normandy (with)
  - Northern France
  - Rhineland
  - Ardennes-Alsace
  - Central Europe
- Asiatic Pacific Campaign
  - New Guinea
  - Philippines
  - Leyte (with)
  - Luzon
  - India-Burma
  - Central Burma

Vietnam

1. Advisory
2. Defense
3. Counteroffensive
4. Counteroffensive, Phase II
5. Counteroffensive, Phase III
6. Counteroffensive, Phase IV
7. Counteroffensive, Phase V
8. Counteroffensive, Phase VI
9. Counteroffensive, Phase VII
10. Tet Counteroffensive
11. Tet 69/Counteroffensive
12. Summer-Fall 1969
13. Winter-Spring 1970
14. Sanctuary Counteroffensive
15. Consolidation I
16. Consolidation II
17. Cease-Fire

Armed Forces Expeditions

1. Grenada (with)
2. Panama (with)

Global War on Terrorism

1.

Afghanistan

1. Liberation of Afghanistan
2. Consolidation I
3. Consolidation II

Iraqi

1. Liberation of Iraq
2. Transition of Iraq
3. Iraqi Governance
4. National Resolution

== Decorations ==
- Presidential Unit Citations (Army)
  - El Guetar
  - Salerno
  - Pointe du Hoc
  - Saar River Area
  - Myitkyina
  - Vietnam 1966-1968
  - Afghanistan 2010
- Joint Meritorious Unit Citations
  - Panama 1989
  - Afghanistan 04 Oct 2001- 31 Dec 2004
- Valorous Unit Award for
  - Vietnam - II Corps Area
  - Bình Dương Province
  - III Corps Area 1969
  - Fish Hook
  - III Corps Area 1971
  - Thừa Thiên–Quảng Trị
  - Grenada
  - Mogadishu
  - Haditha, Iraq
  - Southern Afghanistan 2011
- Meritorious Unit Commendations (Army)
  - Vietnam 1968
  - Vietnam 1969
  - Vietnam 1969–1970
  - Pacific Area
  - Afghanistan 2011

== See also ==
- 75th Ranger Regiment
- United States Army Rangers
