= Cyrtodactylus bidoupimontis =

Scientific classification
- Kingdom: Animalia
- Phylum: Chordata
- Class: Reptilia
- Order: Squamata
- Suborder: Gekkota
- Family: Gekkonidae
- Genus: Cyrtodactylus
- Species: C. bidoupimontis

Binomial name
- Cyrtodactylus bidoupimontis Nazarov et al., 2012

Species of lizard

Cyrtodactylus bidoupimontis is a gecko from Binh Phuoc and Lam Dong provinces, southern Vietnam.

== Description ==
This species is distinguished from other species of the C. irregularis complex by its absence of enlarged, conical tubercles on its dorsal tail-base; the presence of flat and rounded dorsal tubercles; the pale dorsal head surface pattern lacks dark brown irregular spots with light edges; and it possesses elongated limbs.
