= National Route 14 (Vietnam) =

Road in Vietnam

National Route 14
- Quốc lộ 14

Route information
- Part of AH17 and
- Length: 980 km (610 mi)

Major junctions
- North end: QL 9A in Đa Krông, Quảng Trị province

- South end: QL 13 in Chơn Thành, Đồng Nai

Location
- Country: Vietnam

Highway system
- Transport in Vietnam
← QL 13	→ QL 14A

National Route 14 (Vietnamese: Quốc lộ 14) is a highway connecting the Central Highlands provinces together and connecting the Central Highlands with the North Central Coast and Southeast.

== History ==
National Route 14 was built by the French colonials during the 1912-1935 Ethnic Rebellion of Cambodia. The insurgents were based in the Central Highlands and the connecting of that region to uncontested territory was instrumental to many French victories.
