= Cyrtodactylus bugiamapensis =

Scientific classification
- Kingdom: Animalia
- Phylum: Chordata
- Class: Reptilia
- Order: Squamata
- Suborder: Gekkota
- Family: Gekkonidae
- Genus: Cyrtodactylus
- Species: C. bugiamapensis

Binomial name
- Cyrtodactylus bugiamapensis Nazarov et al., 2012

Species of lizard

Cyrtodactylus bugiamapensis is a gecko from Binh Phuoc and Lam Dong provinces, southern Vietnam.

== Description ==
This species is distinguished from other species of the C. irregularis complex by being medium-sized, with a maximum length of 76.8 millimetres (3.02 in); its tail is relatively thin, longer than its body; it possesses enlarged femoral scales without any femoral pores; it lacks a precloacal groove; it counts with 36–46 longitudinal rows of ventral scales at its midbody; its dorsal pattern consists of a dark neck band, and irregular dark brown spots with bright white edges.
