= Bình Long province =

Former province of the Republic of Vietnam

Coordinates: 11.6940°N 106.6010°E

Bình Long Province Tỉnh Bình Long
- Province of Republic of Vietnam
- 1956–1975
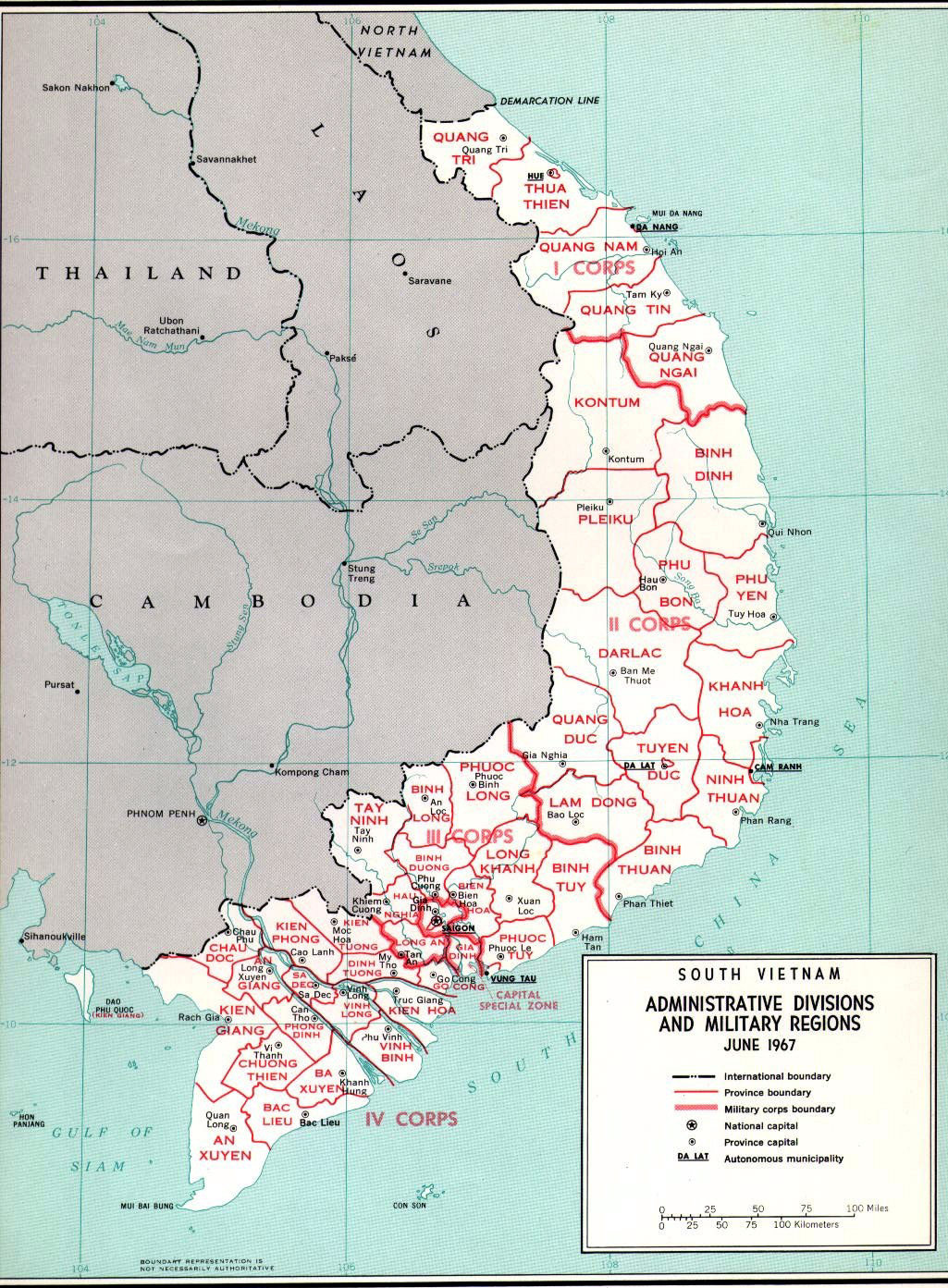
- Map of the Bình Long Province in the Republic of Vietnam, 1967
- Capital: An Lộc
- Area
  - 1967: 2,333.58 km^{2} (901.00 sq mi)
- Population
  - 1967: 76,375
- Historical era: 20th century
  - 1955 State of Vietnam referendum: 23 October 1955
  - Decree No. 143-NV: 22 October
  - Battle of An Lộc: 13 April 1972 – 20 July 1972
  - Fall of Saigon: 30 April 1975
- Political subdivisions: An Lộc; Chơn Thành; Lộc Ninh
Preceded by	Succeeded by
Bình Phước province	Sông Bé province
- Today part of: Vietnam

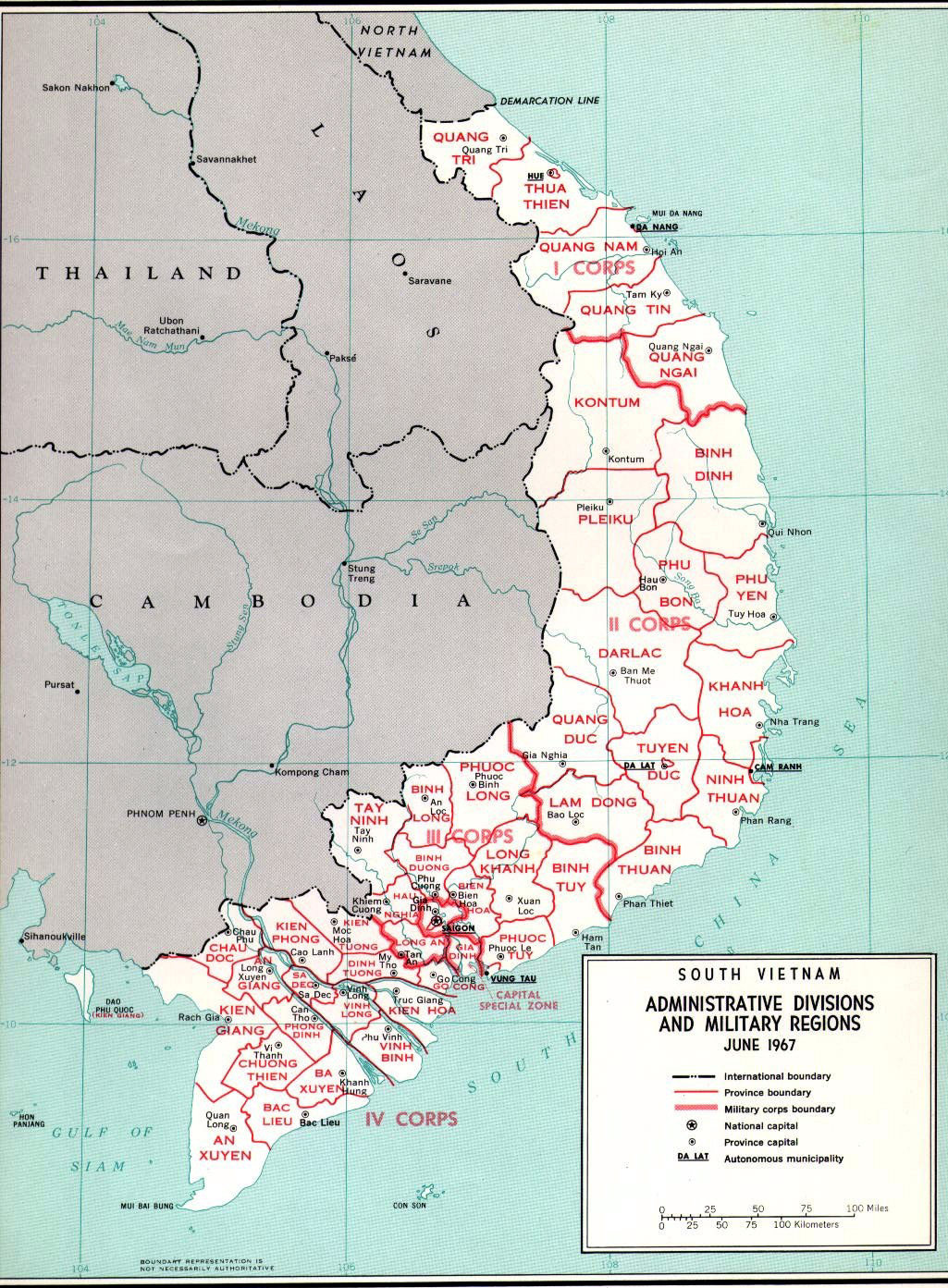
Bình Dương, Phước Long and Bình Long provinces in map of South Vietnam

Bình Long, officially Bình Long Province, is a former province of the Republic of Vietnam, which now corresponds to the northwestern part of Đồng Nai. It was established by dividing Biên Hòa Province on 22 October 1956 by Decree No. 143-NV, which was issued by Ngo Dinh Diem. From 13 April 1972 to 20 July 1972, Bình Long was the scene of the Battle of An Lộc, one of the biggest battles during the Easter Offensive in the Vietnam War. Following the Fall of Saigon in 1975, Bình Long, Phước Long, and Bình Dương were combined to form Sông Bé. By the end of 1996, Sông Bé was dissolved and, along with Bình Long, now comprises part of Đồng Nai.

== Districts ==
- An Lộc
- Lộc Ninh
- Chơn Thành
