= Thới Hòa =

Thới Hòa Phường Thới Hòa
- Ward
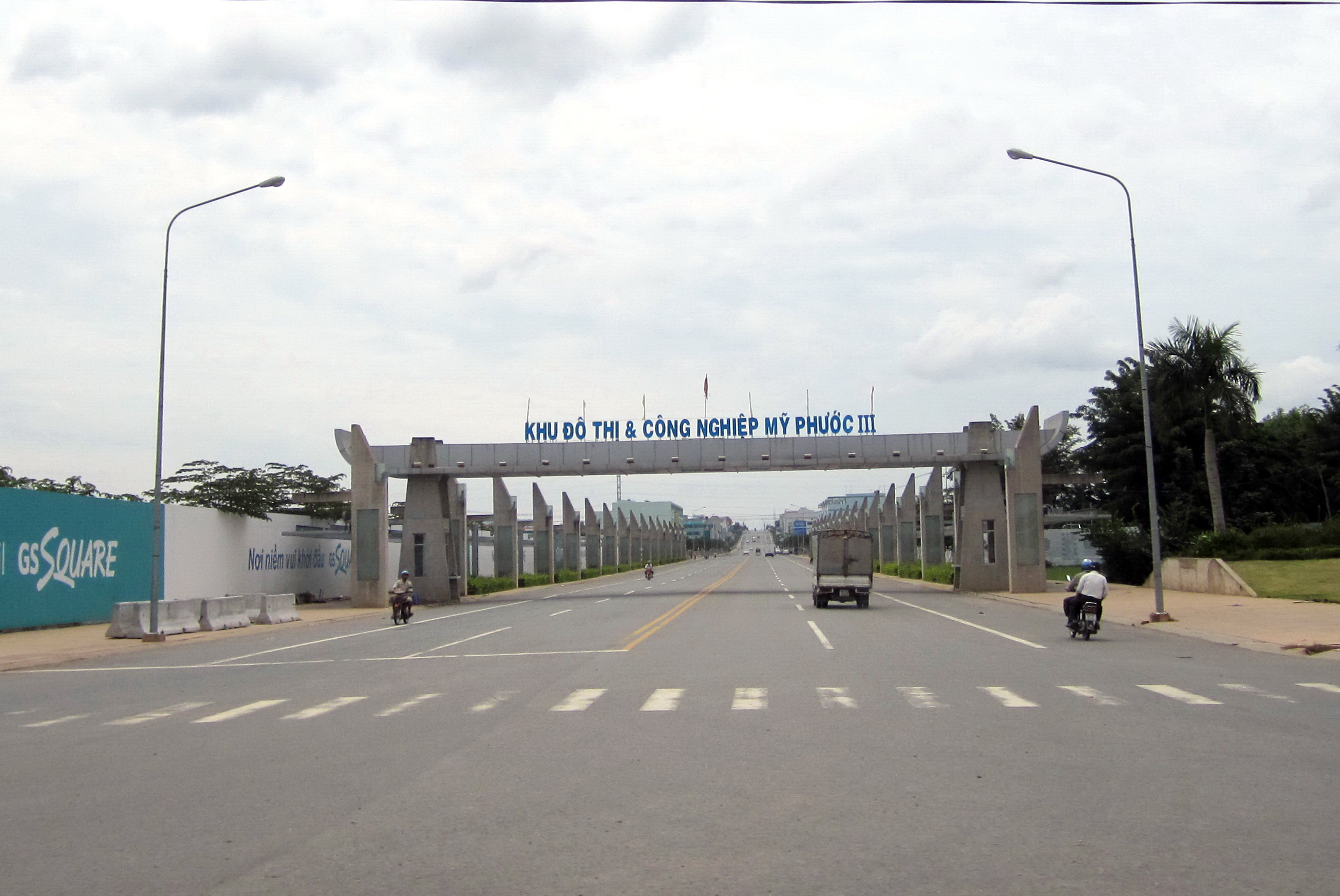
- Mỹ Phước 3 Industrial Park
- Interactive map of Thới Hòa
- Coordinates: 11°05′54″N 106°37′24″E
- Country: Vietnam
- Municipality: Ho Chi Minh City
- Established: June 16, 2025

Area
  - Total: 14.64 sq mi (37.93 km^{2})

Population (2024)
  - Total: 79,601
  - Density: 5,435/sq mi (2,099/km^{2})
- Time zone: UTC+07:00 (Indochina Time)
- Administrative code: 25846

Thới Hòa (Vietnamese: Phường Thới Hòa) is a ward of Ho Chi Minh City, Vietnam. It is one of the 168 new wards, communes and special zones of the city following the reorganization in 2025.

== Administration ==
Thới Hòa is divided into 7 neighborhoods: 1, 2, 3A, 3B, 4, 5, 6.

== History ==
Thới Hòa was formerly a commune of Bến Cát district, Bình Dương province. In 2013, it became a ward of Bến Cát town when the town was established from the southern part of the district.

On June 16, 2025, the National Assembly Standing Committee issued Resolution No. 1685/NQ-UBTVQH15 on the arrangement of commune-level administrative units of Ho Chi Minh City in 2025 (effective from June 16, 2025). Accordingly, Thới Hòa is one of the 5 wards, communes that are exempted from the merger and remain unchanged (Clause 164, Article 1).

== Infrastructure ==
Thới Hòa is an industrial district of the former Bình Dương province, it is home to the Mỹ Phước 1, Mỹ Phước 3 and Thới Hòa industrial parks. The ward has a well-planned urban structure with a modern, spacious transportation network, along with many modern residential areas and green parks. Three major transportation highways run through the ward, including the Mỹ Phước Tân Vạn Highway, Ho Chi Minh City Ring Road 4, and National Route 13.
