= Cyrtodactylus dati =

Scientific classification
- Kingdom: Animalia
- Phylum: Chordata
- Class: Reptilia
- Order: Squamata
- Suborder: Gekkota
- Family: Gekkonidae
- Genus: Cyrtodactylus
- Species: C. dati

Binomial name
- Cyrtodactylus dati Tri, 2013

Species of lizard

Cyrtodactylus dati is a species of gecko that is endemic to Bình Phước province, Vietnam.
