= Lộc Ninh =

Lộc Ninh may refer to several places in Vietnam:

- Lộc Ninh District, a rural district of Bình Phước Province
- Lộc Ninh, Bình Phước, a township and capital of Lộc Ninh District
  - Phase III Offensive#Lộc Ninh, a battle fought in 1968
- Lộc Ninh, Quảng Bình, a commune of Đồng Hới
- Lộc Ninh, Tây Ninh, a commune of Dương Minh Châu District
- Lộc Ninh, Bạc Liêu, a commune of Hồng Dân District
