= Bà Rá mountain =

Mountain in Vietnam

Coordinates: 11.817°N 107.001°E

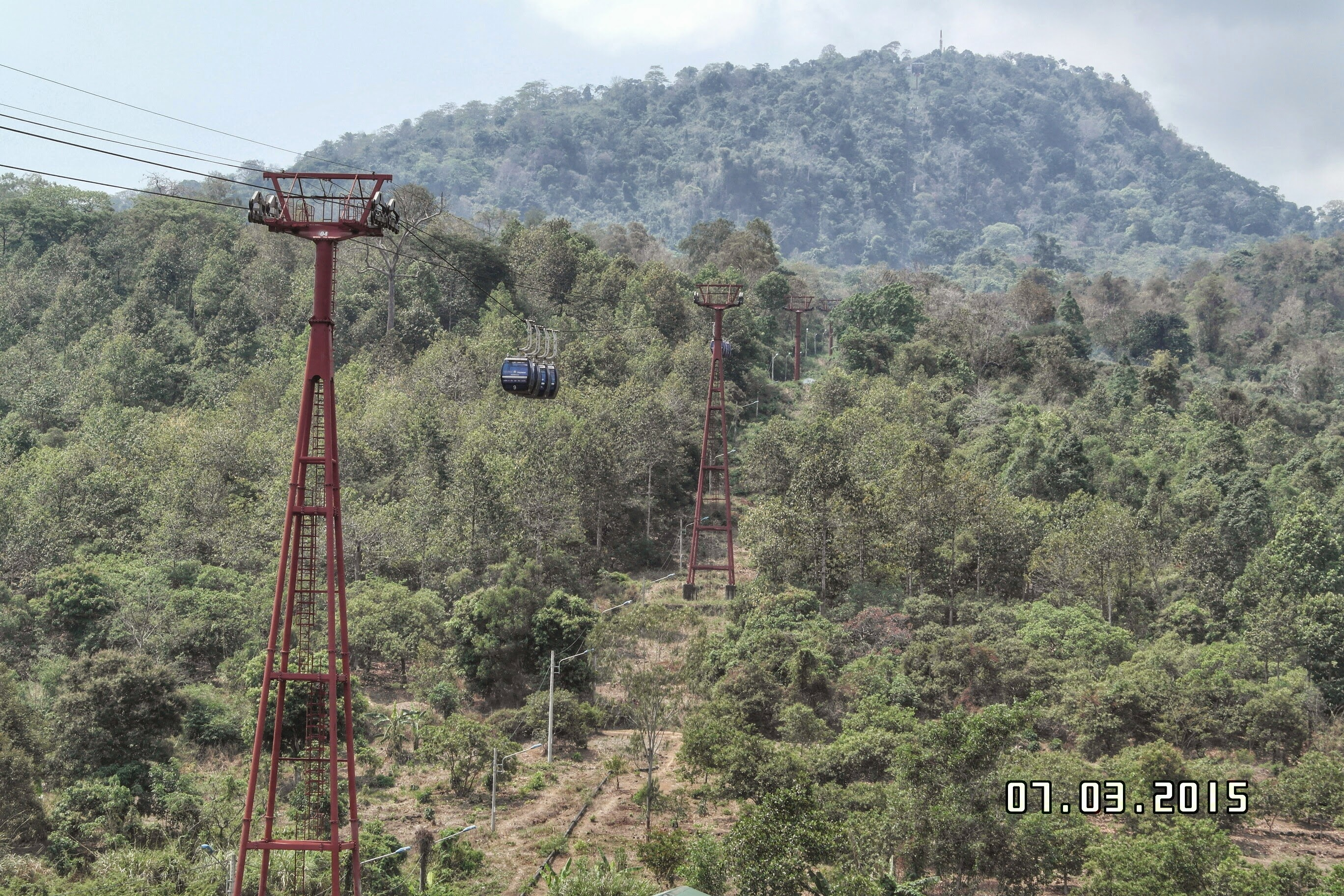
Cable cars at Bà Rá mountain

Bà Rá mountain or White Virgin Mountain (núi Bà Rá) is a mountain in the Bình Phước province of Vietnam. It is a twin with Núi Bà Đen, Black Virgin Mountain
