= Phước Long province =

Historic province of Vietnam

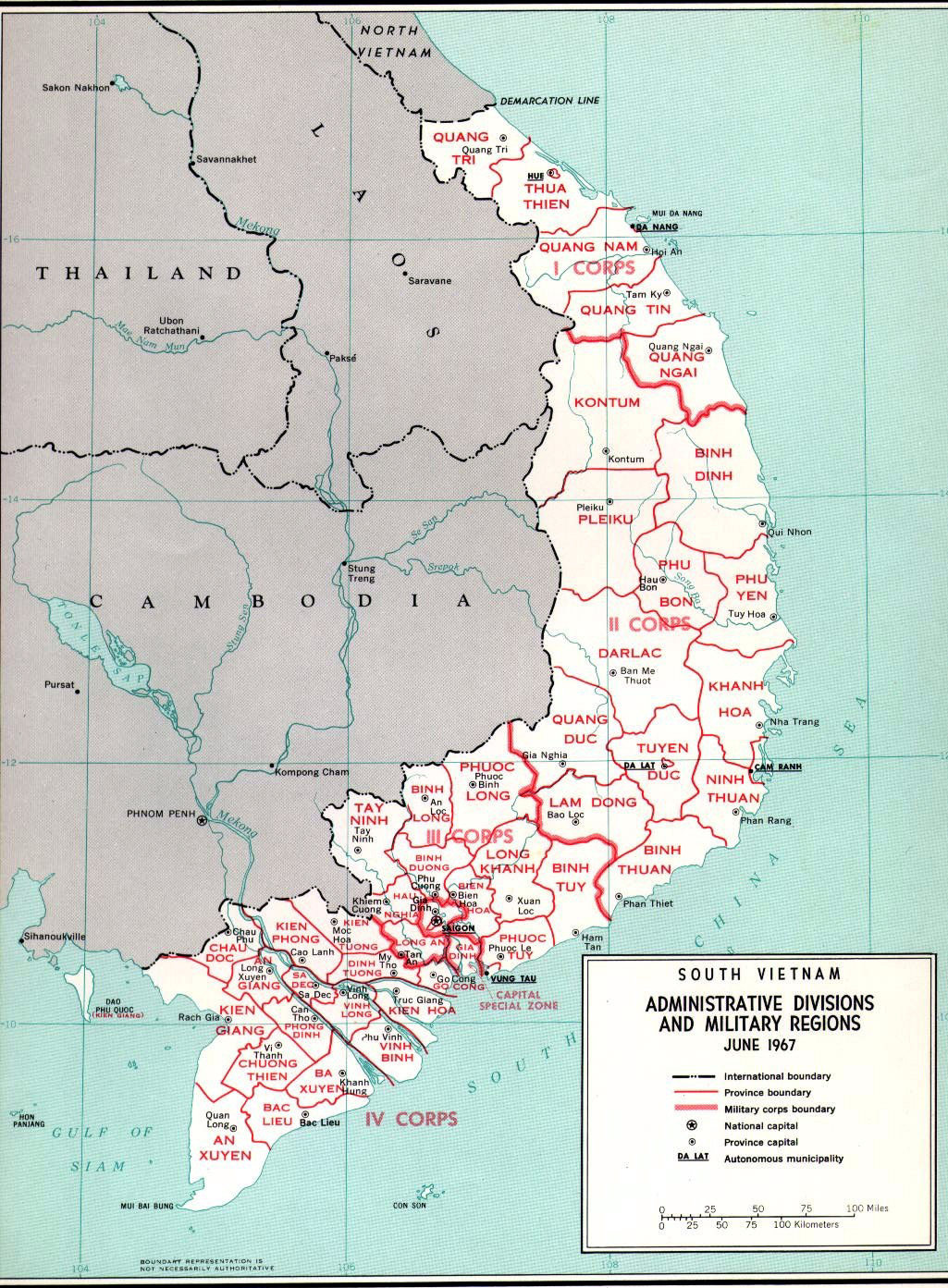
Bình Dương, Phước Long and Bình Long provinces in map of South Vietnam

Phước Long is a former province of Southeast region of Vietnam. It was established on 22 October 1956 by a presidential decree. It was one of South Vietnam's 22 provinces. It is now part of Bình Phước province. The province was originally into three districts: Phước Bình, Bù Đốp, and Phước Hòa. In 1961, it was reorganized as four districts: Bố Đức, Phước Bình, Đức Phong and Đôn Luân. The administrative center was in Phước Bình.

== History ==
- On 23 January 1959, part of Phước Long province was divided to form Phước Thành province.
- On 24 July 1961, Phước Hòa District was dissolved.
- In 1976 Phước Long province was merged with Bình Dương province and Bình Long province to form the new Sông Bé province.

== Districts ==
- Bố Đức
- Phước Bình
- Đức Phong
- Đôn Luân
