= National Route 13 (Vietnam) =

Road in Vietnam

National Route 13
- Quốc lộ 13
- Đại lộ Bình Dương (Note: lit. 'Bình Dương Avenue'. From the Bình Dương province welcome gate in Thuận An to Tân Định ward in Bến Cát.)

Route information
- Part of AH17
- Length: 149.5 km (92.9 mi)

Major junctions
- North end: Hoa Lư Border Gate, Cambodian border
- in Chơn Thành, Đồng Nai; in Thành Tâm, Chơn Thành, Đồng Nai; in Hiệp Bình Phước, Thủ Đức, Ho Chi Minh City
- South end: Ward 26, Bình Thạnh, Ho Chi Minh City

Location
- Country: Vietnam
- Municipalities: Hồ Chí Minh City, Đồng Nai

Highway system
- Transport in Vietnam
← QL 12C	→ QL 14

National Route 13 (Vietnamese: Quốc lộ 13) is a highway in southern Vietnam stretching from the northeastern outskirts of Ho Chi Minh City, the commercial centre and most populous region of the country, to the Hoa Lu border gate, the Vietnam-Cambodia border. The highway starts around Thủ Đức on the northern outskirts of Ho Chi Minh City, once the site of the military academy of the Army of the Republic of Vietnam, and travels north through the provinces of Bình Dương and Bình Phước. The highway passes through the provincial cities of Thuận An, Thủ Dầu Một; towns of Bến Cát, Chơn Thành, Bình Long; and districts of Đồng Phú, Hớn Quản, Lộc Ninh.

During the Vietnam War the road was nicknamed Thunder Road by US forces.
