= Tân Khai =

- Ward
- Location within Vietnam
- Coordinates: 11°33′47″N 106°37′00″E
- Country: Vietnam
- Region: Southeast
- Municipality: Đồng Nai
- Time zone: UTC+7 (UTC + 7)

Tân Khai is a ward in Đồng Nai, Vietnam. This is one of 95 communes and wards in the province after the 2025 reorganization.
