= 81st Airborne Ranger Group =

- Vietnamese: Liên-đoàn 81 Biệt-cách Dù
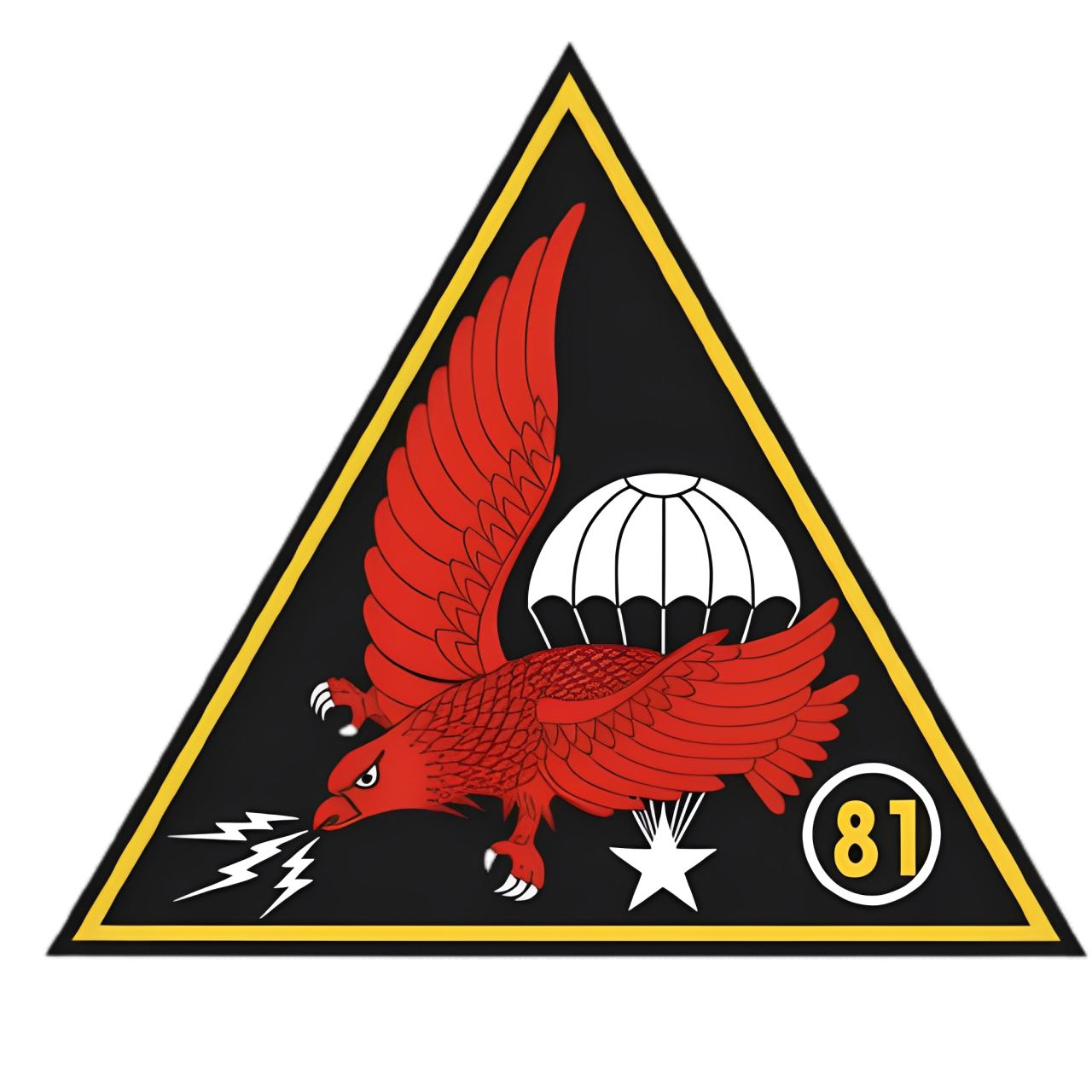
- Active: 1 November 1964 – 1975
- Country: South Vietnam
- Branch: Army of the Republic of Vietnam Special Forces
- Type: Commando; Rapid reaction force Special operations Counterterrorism
- Size: 3,000 (1975)
- Engagements: Vietnam War: Tet Offensive; First Battle of Saigon; Ho Chi Minh Campaign

The 81st Airborne Ranger Group or 81st Airborne Ranger Brigade (Vietnamese: Liên-đoàn 81 Biệt-cách Dù) was a unique special unit with airborne operations and long-range penetration capabilities, but operated under the direct command of the Joint General Staff (JGS)

== History ==
=== The Special Forces ===
It was originally formed as part of the Project DELTA reaction force. Formed on 1 November 1964 as the 91st Airborne Commando Battalion, it consisted of three companies of Montagnards. A fourth company was added in 1965. It was reorganized in 1966 as the 81st Airborne Ranger Battalion by the "purging of non-Vietnamese" to make it more "effective". The 81st consisted of six all-Vietnamese companies. Officially under Army of the Republic of Vietnam Special Forces (LLDB) command, not that of Ranger Command, the battalion was actually under the direct control of Project DELTA. However, two companies were made available to the LLDB. Its primary mission was to provide airmobile reaction forces to aid in the extraction of reconnaissance teams and execute immediate exploitation commando-style raids on targets discovered by the teams. It was also used to reinforce SF camps under siege. During and after the Tet Offensive, it also fought in Saigon and handled urban fighting conditions quite well.

The 81st Airborne Ranger Battalion was later expanded to seven companies. It was renamed the 81st Airborne Ranger Group, which was facilitated by the merger of Delta Teams with the existing three Ranger Companies. The entire unit was parachute-trained and was under the direct control of the ARVN Military Intelligence (G-2).

In 1975, it was headquartered at Trang Lon, Tay Linh, and consisted of a Headquarters, seven Rangers, and one Pathfinder company. The group strength varied from 920 to 1,200 men.

The 91st Airborne Ranger Group continued to wear the old LLDB green berets and distinct camouflage uniforms, heavily influenced by their early history alongside U.S. Green Berets.

=== Fall of Tan Son Nhut Air Base ===
During the 1975 Ho Chi Minh Campaign, elements of the group were defending Tan Son Nhut Air Base.

The 3rd Task Force, 81st Airborne Ranger Group, commanded by Major Pham Chau Tai, defended Tan Son Nhut, and they were joined by the remnants of the Loi Ho unit. At 07:15 on 30 April the PAVN 24th Regiment approached the Bay Hien intersection (10.793°N 106.653°E), 1.5 km (0.93 mi) from the base's main gate. The lead T-54 was hit by M67 recoilless rifle fire, and then the next T-54 was hit by a shell from an M48 tank. The PAVN infantry moved forward and engaged the ARVN in house-to-house fighting, forcing them to withdraw to the base by 08:45. The PAVN then sent three tanks and an infantry battalion to assault the main gate, and they were met by intensive anti-tank and machine gun fire, knocking out the three tanks and killing at least 20 PAVN soldiers. The PAVN tried to bring forward an 85mm antiaircraft gun, but the ARVN knocked it out before it could start firing. The PAVN 10th Division ordered eight more tanks and another infantry battalion to join the attack, but as they approached the Bay Hien intersection, they were hit by an airstrike from RVNAF jets operating from Binh Thuy Air Base, which destroyed two T-54s. The six surviving tanks arrived at the main gate at 10:00 and began their attack, with two being knocked out by antitank fire in front of the gate and another destroyed as it attempted a flanking manoeuvre.

At approximately 10:30, Pham heard the surrender broadcast of President Dương Văn Minh and went to the ARVN Joint General Staff Compound to seek instructions. He called General Minh, who told him to prepare to surrender. Pham reportedly told Minh, "If Viet Cong tanks are entering Independence Palace, we will come down there to rescue you, sir." Minh refused Pham's suggestion, and Pham then told his men to withdraw from the base gates. At 11:30, the North Vietnamese entered the base.
