= Thạch An =

- Interactive map of Thạch An
- Coordinates: 22.48590675072222°N 106.39712455218746°E
- Country: Vietnam
- Province: Cao Bằng
- Region: Northeast
- Established: 16 June 2025

Area
  - Total: 113.74 km^{2} (43.92 sq mi)

Population (2025)
  - Total: 7,589
  - Density: 66/km^{2} (170/sq mi)

Thạch An is a commune in Cao Bằng province, Vietnam.

== History ==
The area of present-day Thạch An commune was formerly part of Thạch An district, Cao Bằng province.

On 16 June 2025:

- The National Assembly of Vietnam adopted Resolution No. 203/2025/QH15, amending and supplementing several articles of the Constitution of Vietnam. The resolution took effect on 16 June 2025. The resolution provided for the termination of district-level administrative units nationwide from 1 July 2025.
- The Standing Committee of the National Assembly of Vietnam issued Resolution No. 1657/NQ-UBTVQH15 on the reorganization of commune-level administrative units in Cao Bằng province in 2025, which took effect on 16 June 2025. Under the resolution, the entire area and population of the former communes of Tiên Thành in Quảng Hòa district, and Vân Trình and Lê Lai in Thạch An district, were consolidated to form a new commune named Thạch An.
