= Bù Đốp district =

Bù Đốp district Huyện Bù Đốp
- District
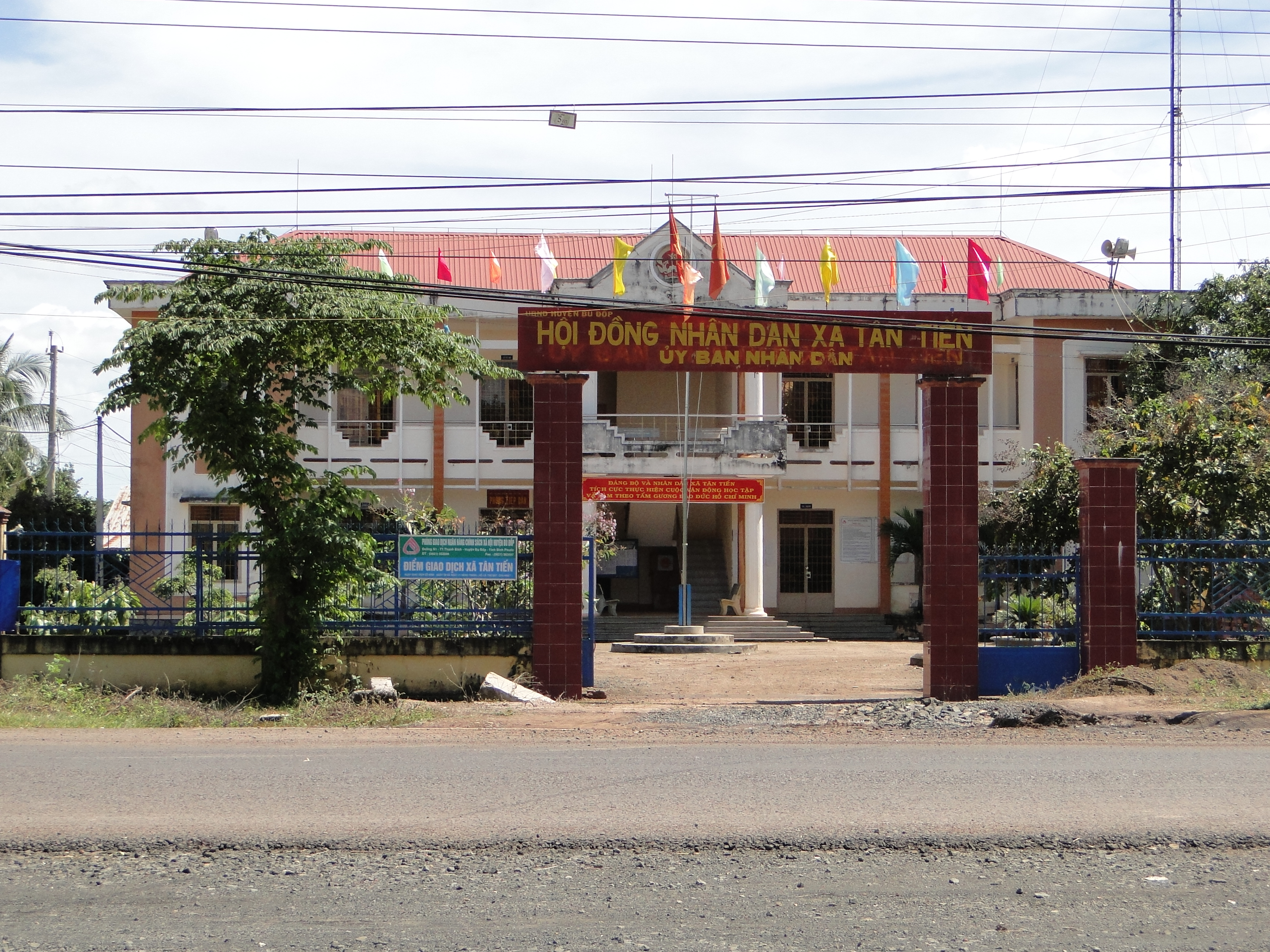
- Interactive map of Bù Đốp district
- Location of Bù Đốp in Vietnam
- Coordinates: 11°59′8″N 106°45′49″E
- Country: Vietnam
- Province: Bình Phước
- Capital: Thanh Bình

Area
  - Total: 378 km^{2} (146 sq mi)

Population
  - Total: 51,597
- Time zone: UTC+7 (Indochina Time)

Bù Đốp is a former rural district in Bình Phước province of the Southeast region of Vietnam, approximately 90 km north of Ho Chi Minh City, near the border with Cambodia. As of 2003 the district had a population of 51,597. The district covers an area of 378 km^{2} (146 sq mi). The district capital lies at Thanh Bình.
