= Thiện Hưng =

Thiện Hưng Xã Thiện Hưng
- Commune
- Thiện Hưng commune
- Interactive map of Thiện Hưng
- Coordinates: 11°57′29″N 106°47′52″E
- Country: Vietnam
- Region: Southeast
- Municipality: Đồng Nai
- Time zone: UTC+7 (UTC + 7)

Thiện Hưng is a commune (xã) of Đồng Nai, Vietnam.
