= Bù Đăng district =

Coordinates: 11°46′09″N 107°14′14″E

Bù Đăng district Huyện Bù Đăng
- District
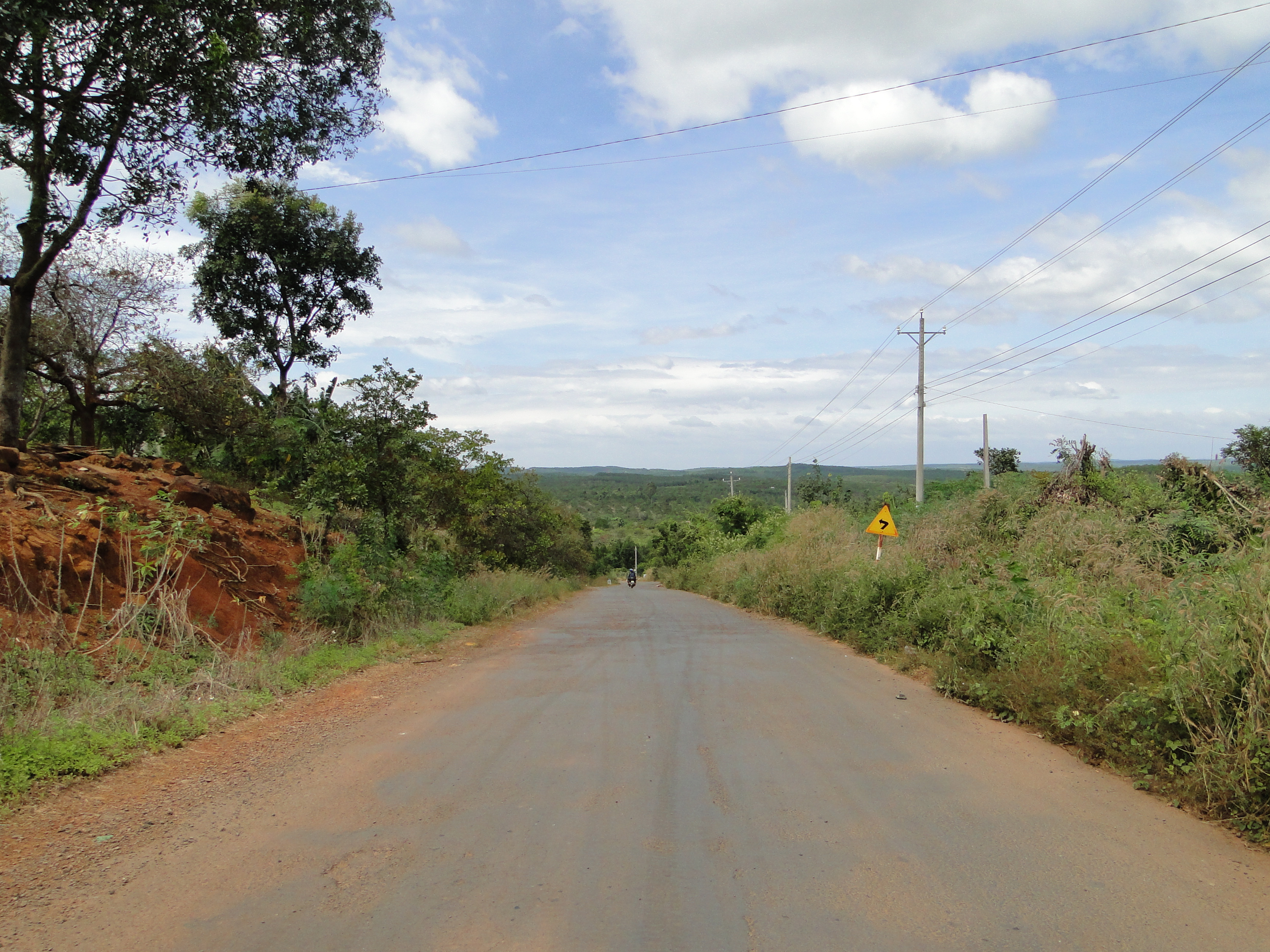
- Road in Bù Đăng district

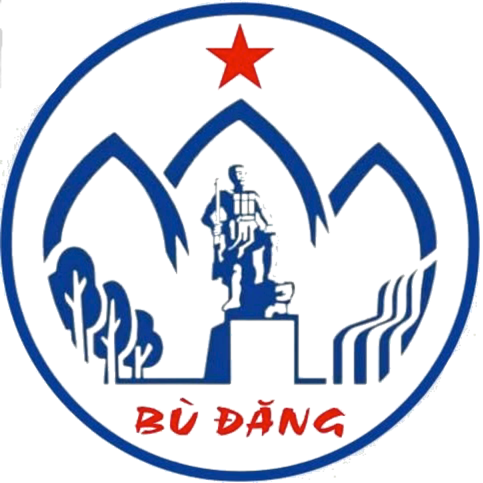
- Seal
- Interactive map of Bù Đăng district
- Country: Vietnam
- Region: Southeast
- Province: Bình Phước
- Capital: Đức Phong

Area
  - Total: 575 sq mi (1,488 km^{2})

Population (2018)
  - Total: 131,296
- Time zone: UTC+7 (Indochina Time)

Bù Đăng is a former rural district of Bình Phước province in the Southeast region of Vietnam. As of 2003 the district had a population of 108,855. The district covers an area of 1,488 km^{2}. The district capital lies at Đức Phong.
