= Đồng Phú district =

Coordinates: 10°46′09″N 107°14′14″E

Đồng Phú district Huyện Đồng Phú
- District
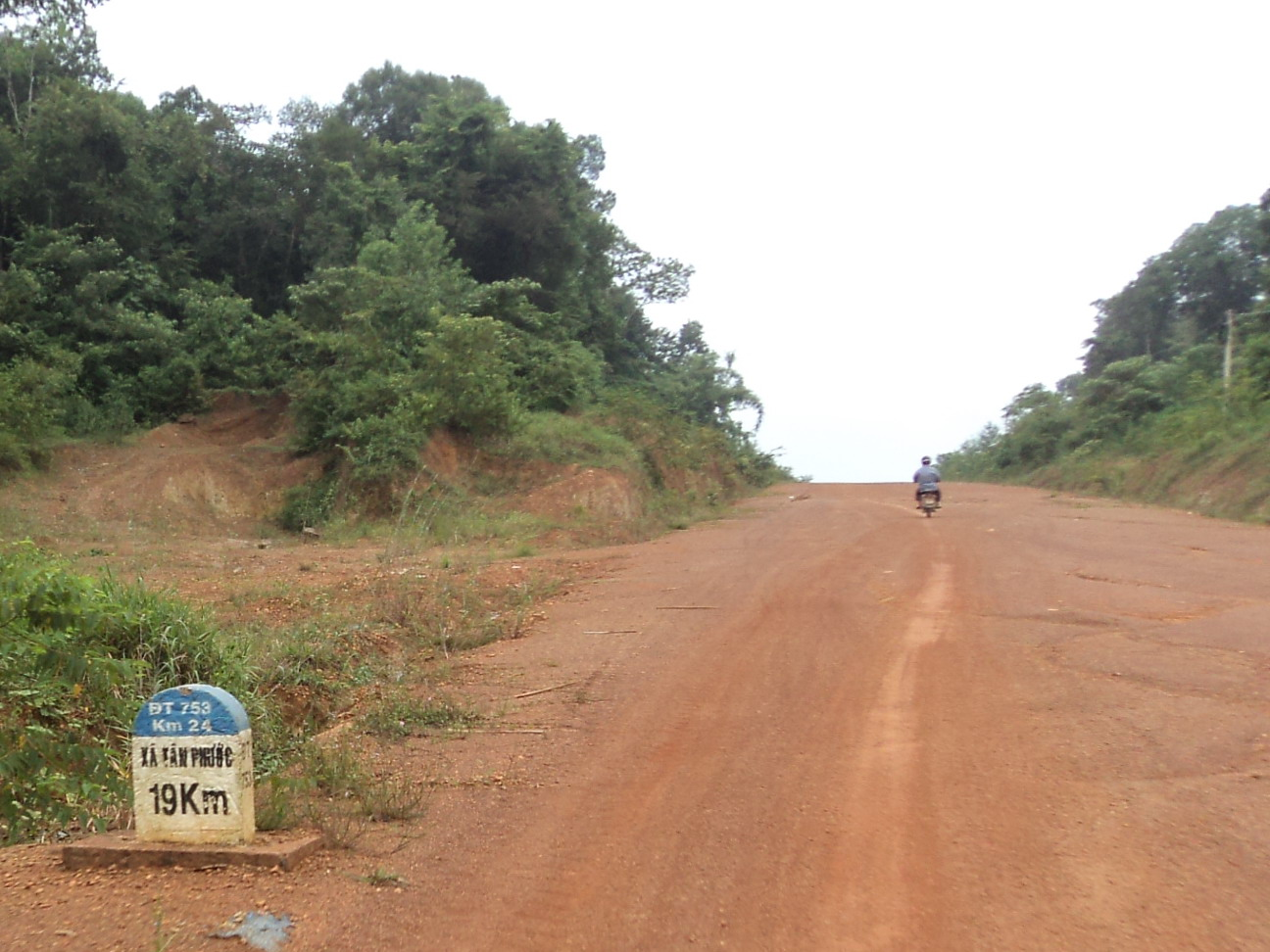
- Road sign leading to Đồng Phú
- Country: Vietnam
- Region: Southeast
- Province: Bình Phước
- Capital: Tân Phú

Area
  - Total: 359 sq mi (929 km^{2})

Population (2018)
  - Total: 99,675
- Time zone: UTC+07:00 (Indochina Time)

Đồng Phú is a former rural district (huyện) of Bình Phước province in the Southeast region of Vietnam. As of 2003 the district had a population of 75,573. The district covers an area of 929 km^{2} (359 sq mi). The district capital lies at Tân Phú.
