= Hớn Quản district =

Coordinates: 11°37′37″N 106°36′02″E

Hớn Quản Huyện Hớn Quản
- District
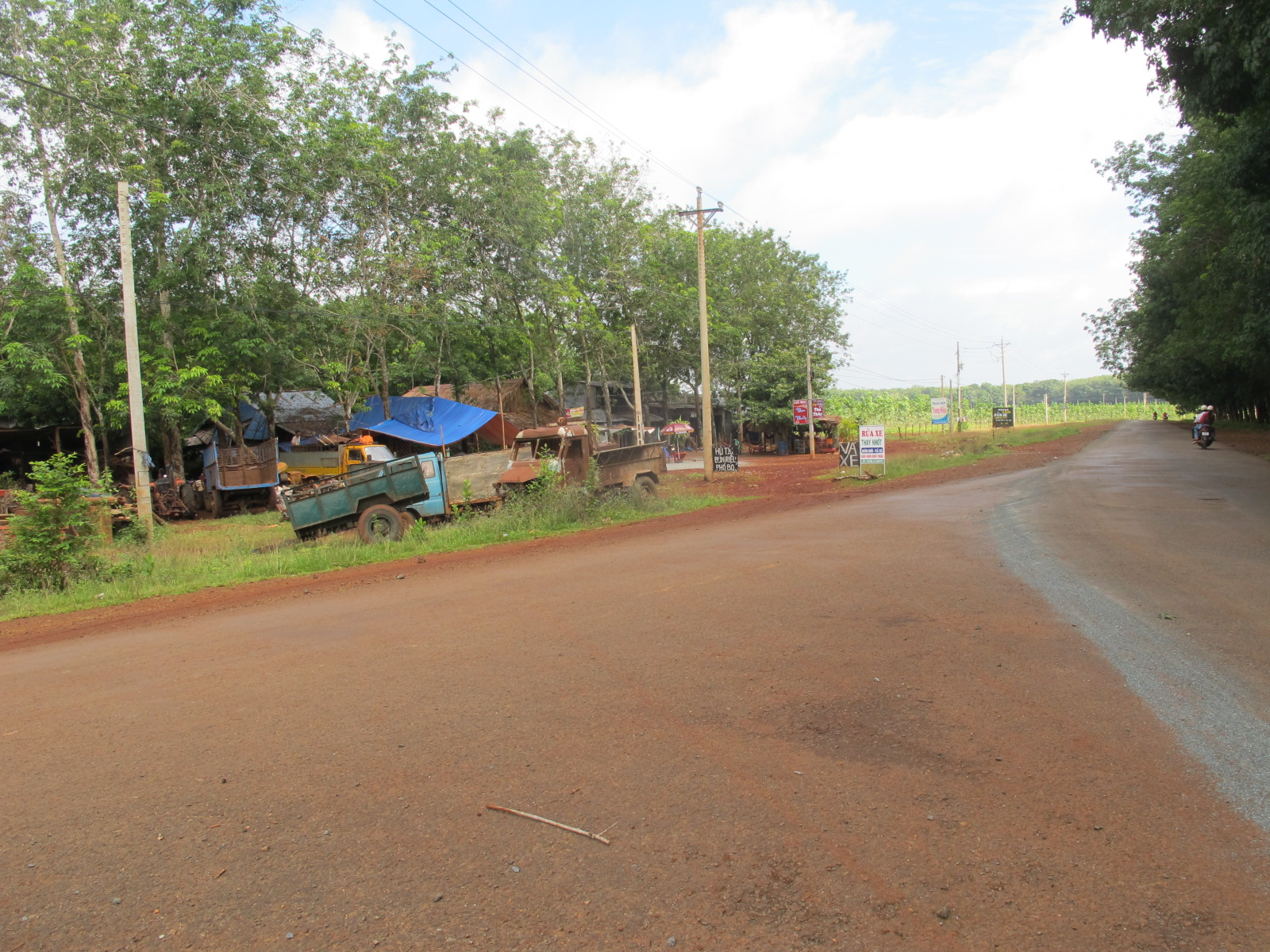

- Seal
- Interactive map of Hớn Quản
- Country: Vietnam
- Region: Southeast
- Province: Bình Phước
- Capital: Tân Khai

Area
  - Total: 256.3 sq mi (663.8 km^{2})

Population (2018)
  - Total: 115,268
  - Density: 449.7/sq mi (173.6/km^{2})
- Time zone: UTC+7 (UTC + 7)
- Website: Official Website

Hớn Quản is a former rural district in Bình Phước province. It was founded on August 11, 2009 from part of Bình Long. It has area of 663.8 km^{2}.

The district is subdivided to 13 commune-level subdivisions, including Tân Khai township (district capital) and the rural communes of: Thanh An, An Khương, Đồng Nơ, Tân Hiệp, Minh Đức, Minh Tâm, Tân Lợi, Phước An, Tân Hưng, Thanh Bình, An Phú and Tân Quan.
