= Lộc Ninh, Đồng Nai =

Capital of Lộc Ninh district, Vietnam

Lộc Ninh Phường Lộc Ninh
- Ward
- Lộc Ninh ward
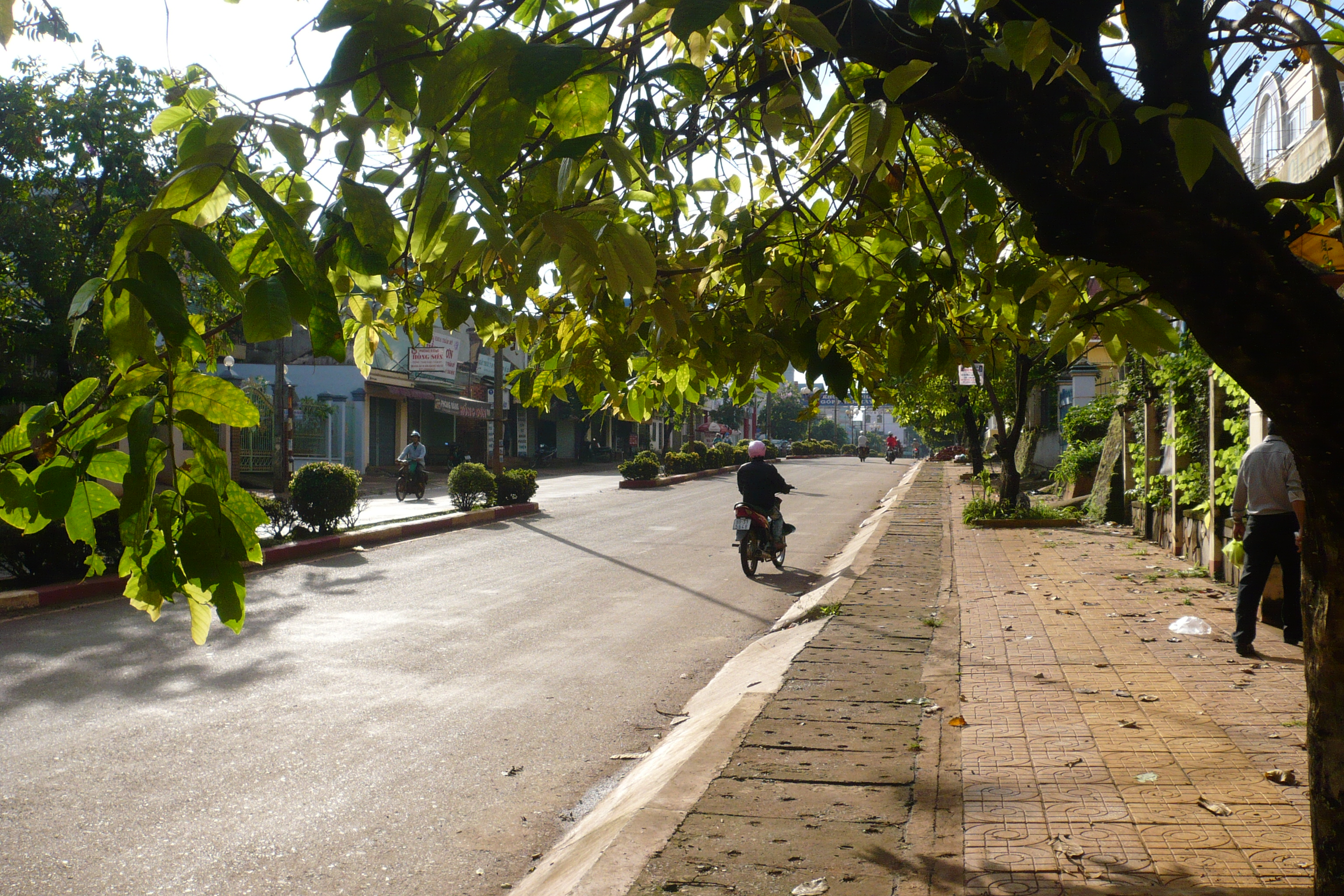

- Location in Vietnam
- Coordinates: 11°50′35.700″N 106°35′27.700″E
- Country: Vietnam
- Region: Southeast
- Municipality: Đồng Nai

Population (April 1, 2009)
  - Total: 10,504
- Time zone: UTC+7 (UTC + 7)

Lộc Ninh is a ward of Đồng Nai in the Southeast region of Vietnam.

During the Vietnam War, the 1967 "First Battle of Loc Ninh" and the 1972 "Battle of Loc Ninh" took place in Bình Phước Province, near the Cambodian border at the northern end of National Road 13, north of the presently named Ho Chi Minh City (né Saigon). Lộc Ninh served as the seat of the Provisional Revolutionary Government of the Republic of South Vietnam from its formation in 1969 until the Fall of Saigon in 1975.

== Transport ==
In 2007, a section of the proposed Trans-Asian Railway connecting Cambodia with Vietnam would pass through Lộc Ninh. The Vietnamese government completed a feasibility study on the Saigon–Lộc Ninh Railway, and is working with the Cambodian government to finalize the connecting rail point on the Cambodian side. Once the exact connecting point is found, work is expected to begin immediately on the 145-kilometer link between Lộc Ninh and Hồ Chí Minh City.

== See also ==
- Transport in Vietnam
