= Lộc Ninh district =

Coordinates: 11°50′35.700″N 106°35′27.700″E

Lộc Ninh district Huyện Lộc Ninh
- District
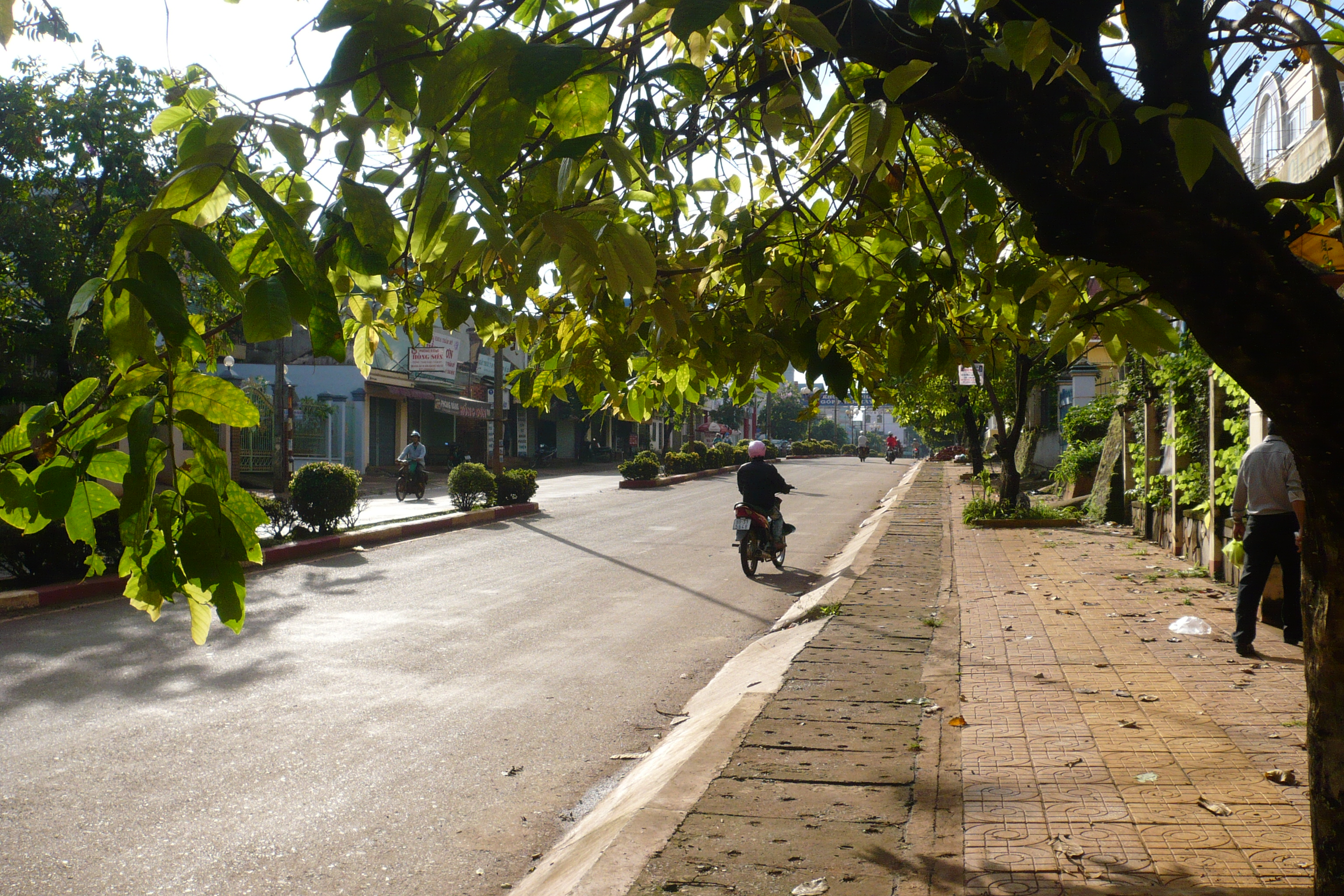
- Interactive map of Lộc Ninh district
- Country: Vietnam
- Region: Southeast
- Province: Bình Phước
- Capital: Lộc Ninh

Area
  - Total: 333.20 sq mi (862.98 km^{2})

Population (2003)
  - Total: 102,291
- Time zone: UTC+07:00 (Indochina Time)

Lộc Ninh is a former rural district of Bình Phước province in the Southeast region of Vietnam. As of 2003 the district had a population of 102,291. The district covers an area of 862.98 km^{2} and is bordered by Cambodia in the north and west. The district capital lies at Lộc Ninh.

Lộc Ninh township was the location of the 1967 "First Battle of Lộc Ninh" and the 1972 "Battle of Lộc Ninh" in the Vietnam War.
