= Chơn Thành =

Chơn Thành Phường Chơn Thành
- Ward
- Chơn Thành ward
- Location within Vietnam
- Coordinates: 11°24′59″N 106°36′56″E
- Country: Vietnam
- Region: Southeast
- Municipality: Đồng Nai
- Time zone: UTC+7 (UTC + 7)

Chơn Thành is a ward (phường) of Đồng Nai, Vietnam.
