= Battle of the Iron Triangle =

Part of the Vietnam War (1974)

- Part of the Vietnam War
Date	16 May – 20 November 1974
Location	Iron Triangle, Bình Dương Province, South Vietnam 11.133°N 106.544°E
Result	South Vietnamese victory

Belligerents
North Vietnam	South Vietnam

Commanders and leaders
	Lt. Gen. Phạm Quốc Thuần; Lt. Gen. Dư Quốc Đống; Brig. Gen. Lê Minh Đảo

Units involved
7th Division; 9th Division	5th Division; 18th Division; 25th Division

Casualties and losses
Unknown	Unknown; 18th Division: 275 killed, 1,000 wounded 5th Division - 3 M41 tanks, several M—113s.

The Battle of the Iron Triangle took place from 16 May to 20 November 1974, when the People's Army of Vietnam (PAVN) 9th Division captured Rach Bap and An Dien. The Army of the Republic of Vietnam (ARVN) regained the lost towns in a series of costly counterattacks.

== Background ==
The Iron Triangle was an important strategic location, bounded on the north by the jungle and overgrown rubber plantations of the Long Nguyen Secret Zone, on the west by the Saigon River and on the east by the smaller but unfordable obstacle of the Thi Thinh River. Phú Cường, the capital of Bình Dương Province, was an important industrial and farming center and contained the ARVN Engineer School. It was linked by a major highway with the large ARVN Phu Loi Base Camp and, farther east, with Bien Hoa Air Base. Lying as it did in the center of the Saigon River corridor, at the junction of Highways 13 and 1, and only 16 km from the outskirts of Saigon, Phú Cường was vital to the defense of Saigon.

The terrain within the Iron Triangle was flat, almost featureless, and covered by dense brush and undergrowth. The clearings, especially in the northern part, were thick with elephant grass, higher than a man's head. The surface was scarred by countless bomb and shell craters so that vehicular movement off the narrow, rough dirt roads was nearly impossible; even tracked vehicles had difficulty. A vast network of tunnels and trenches, most of them caved-in and abandoned, laced this ground that had been the scene of battles since the First Indochina War.

A weak string of three ARVN outposts protected the northern edge of the Triangle, from Rach Bap (11.1287°N 106.516°E) on the west, close by the Saigon River, along local Route 7 to An Dien (11.148°N 106.586°E) on the Thi Thinh River opposite Bến Cát. Each of these outposts, including Base 82 (11.133°N 106.544°E), which was midway between Rach Bap and An Dien, was manned by a company of the 321st Regional Force (RF) Battalion. Another country road passed by the Rach Bap outpost, local Route 14, which generally paralleled the Saigon River from Tri Tam, through Rach Bap, and veered to the southeast through the Triangle, crossing the Thi Thinh River before it joined Highway 13 north of Phú Cường. The PAVN had blown the bridge on Route 14 over the Thi Thinh a few weeks earlier, but the stream could be spanned by pontoon sections. About midway between Rach Bap and the Thi Thinh crossing of Route 14, the ARVN had another small firebase.

Frequent sweeps and some semi-fixed defensive positions north of Củ Chi manned by the ARVN 25th Division and Hậu Nghĩa Province RF screened the western flank of the Triangle, but PAVN resistance in the Ho Bo Woods opposite Rach Bap and the formidable obstacle of the Saigon River, as well as a lack of resources, limited the influence that the 25th could exert on the situation within the Triangle. The ARVN was strong with infantry, armor, and mutually supporting fire bases and outposts in Bến Cát District east of the Thi Thinh boundary of the Triangle, but only one bridge, a weak span, connected the district town and the Triangle hamlet of An Dien.

== Battle ==
=== PAVN attack ===
On 16 May the PAVN 9th Division began their attack on with heavy artillery, rocket, and mortar concentrations falling on Rach Bap, Base 82 and An Dien. The RF company at Base 82 abandoned its bunkers, many of which had collapsed under the weight of the bombardment, late that afternoon. Rach Bap held out until about 03:00 on 17 May, its surviving defenders withdrawing in the direction of An Dien. The fighting was fierce in An Dien on the 16th, but by the night of 17 May, PAVN forces held the flattened village and its defenses. Remnants of an RF battalion, however, held the western end of the Thi Thinh bridge in a shallow blocking position, while the eastern end, by Bến Cát, was secured by ARVN forces. The PAVN dug in around An Dien but was unable to dislodge the RF positions at the bridge. Two infantry regiments of the 9th Division, with about 10 T-54 and PT-76 tanks, were employed against the dispersed 321st RF Battalion. The 2nd Regiment overran Rach Bap and continued the attack south into the Triangle along Route 14, while the 95C Regiment attacked Base 82 and An Dien. The 271st Regiment was held in reserve.

=== Initial ARVN counterattack at An Dien ===
The ARVN at Ben Cat were unable to counterattack the PAVN immediately at An Dien because the bridgehead held by the RF was too shallow to protect the crossing of any large forces, but III Corps commander Lieutenant general Phạm Quốc Thuần quickly began reinforcing Bến Cát. Task Force 318 arrived in Bến Cát on the afternoon of the 16th and on the 17th began reinforcing the RF holding the bridge and moving against the PAVN's blocking positions west of the bridgehead. The weakness of the ARVN bridgehead and the strength of the enemy positions in An Dien, which included antitank guns and tanks, made it impractical to send any armor of the 318th across the An Dien bridge at this time.

Meanwhile, the 322nd Task Force moved from Tây Ninh Province to Phú Cường and was ordered to prepare to attack into the Triangle along Route 14 in order to oppose the PAVN 2nd Regiment, which was moving south from Rach Rap. Republic of Vietnam Air Force (RVNAF) aerial observers and photography on 17 May revealed two T-54 tanks inside Base 82, which RVNAF fighter-bombers destroyed the next day, and four more in the An Dien base. Initial negative reactions at III Corps Headquarters to the seemingly hasty, if not unwarranted, withdrawal of the RF companies from their positions softened somewhat when the size and composition of the PAVN force was revealed.

Thuần greatly underestimated the strength and tenacity with which the PAVN 9th Division would defend An Dien, although he had accurate intelligence concerning the size, composition, and location of his enemy. His initial plans, which proved unrealistic, called for virtually simultaneous recapture of the three lost bases by about 22 May. Except for the few ARVN infantry and engineers that were thrown across the Thi Thinh River to reinforce the An Dien bridgehead, the first major ARVN unit to move into the Triangle was a battalion of the 43rd Infantry Regiment, 18th Division, which crossed on Route 14 north of Phú Cường. Shortly reinforced by the rest of the regiment, this element, followed by the 322nd Armored Task Force, was to attack Rach Bap and Base 82. Meanwhile, the 318th Task Force would cross the An Dien Bridge, pass through An Dien, and proceed to Base 82. Three Ranger battalions attacking south out of Lai Khê were to strike Base 82 from the north. None of this worked as planned. The 43rd Infantry became stalled after advancing only 4 or 5 km north. Then, the tracked vehicles of the 322nd Task Force found the going extremely slow in the dense brush and cratered terrain. Thuần, concerned that this armored force might become bogged down and have a bridge blown behind it ordered its withdrawal. He discovered, meanwhile, that the An Dien bridge had been seriously weakened by PAVN artillery (including AT-3 missiles) and would not support the tanks of the 318th Task Force. Under PAVN observation and sporadic heavy mortar and artillery fire, ARVN combat engineers attempted to repair the bridge. Casualties mounted, and the work progressed very slowly. About the same time, the 7th Ranger Group, with three battalions, moved southwest out of Lai Khê, crossed the Thi Thinh River and advanced on Base 82. The Rangers were immediately opposed in the thick jungle and rubber plantation by entrenched PAVN 9th Division troops, and their attack stalled well short of the objective.

While the ARVN was experiencing great difficulty advancing, it was pounding An Dien with heavy artillery fire. The North Vietnamese responded against ARVN batteries and the stalled Ranger and infantry columns and sent sappers into an RF command post just south of Bến Cát, where they destroyed a 105 mm howitzer and routed most of the small garrison. The RVNAF meanwhile, gave only limited support as plentiful PAVN antiaircraft artillery and SA-7s forced RVNAF aircraft to high altitudes. On 24 May an armored cavalry squadron of the 25th Division launched a diversionary attack from Gò Dầu Hạ east toward the Boi Loi Woods in an attempt to prevent the 9th Division from committing its reserve, the 271st Regiment, against either the 318th or the 322d Task Forces. By the 25th, the armored cavalry squadron had passed Suoi Cau without encountering any resistance, and another supporting maneuver began with two battalions of the 50th Infantry, 25th Division, moving north from Phú Hòa District along the west bank of the Saigon River.

On 25 May, Thuần met with the commander of the 18th Division, Brigadier general Lê Minh Đảo and the commander of the 3rd Armored Brigade, Brigadier general Trần Quang Khôi, to coordinate the following morning's attack. At that time, the 43rd Regiment was about 7 km south of An Dien, about to attack north, while the 3rd Armored Brigade was preparing to send a cavalry squadron and a Ranger battalion across the An Dien bridge. Although the PAVN's heavy mortar and artillery fire had so weakened the bridge at An Dien that the cavalry could not follow the Rangers, by nightfall the 64th Ranger Battalion was dug in on the eastern edge of An Dien Village. The 43rd Regiment was again ordered to resume the attack north, and the 7th Ranger Group, coming down from Lai Khe was ordered to take Base 82 by night attack on 27 May. Because no progress was made Thuần on 28 May decided to try a fresh approach. First he turned the operation over to Đảo, told him to move his 52nd Regiment over from Phú Giáo District, gave him operational command of the 7th Ranger Group, which was still north of Base 82, and attached to Đảo's 18th Division a reinforced squadron of the 3rd Armored Brigade. Since it would take two days to relieve the 52nd Regiment on the Phú Giáo front and move it into position at Bến Cát, the new operation was scheduled for 30 May. Delays in the relief and movement forced Đảo to move the date to 1 June.

With the Rangers still holding the shallow bridgehead opposite Bến Cát and the 43rd Regiment making slow progress attacking the dug-in PAVN 272nd Regiment south of An Dien. Đảo sent the 2nd Battalion, 52nd Regiment across the Thi Thinh River on an assault bridge south of Bến Cát on 1 June. Once across, it turned north to attack the defenses of the PAVN 95C Regiment in An Dien. Meanwhile, the reconnaissance company and an infantry company from the 18th Division crossed the An Dien bridge and advanced toward the village. Casualties on both sides were heavy as the commander of the 52nd Regiment committed his 1st Battalion behind the 2nd. The PAVN responded by assaulting the ARVN infantry that night with infantry and at least 10 tanks. The two battalions of the 52nd held their positions and were reinforced by the 3rd Battalion the next afternoon. Meanwhile, ARVN combat engineers were clearing the road past the An Dien bridge. Working at night with flash lights to avoid PAVN observation and fire, they removed 38 antitank mines from the route of advance.

Weakened by casualties, the 52nd Infantry made very little progress on 2 and 3 June, and the 43rd Regiment was still being blocked by the PAVN 272nd Regiment. Đảo then ordered his 48th Infantry across the Thi Thinh south of Bến Cát, to pass through the 52nd and take An Dien. While the PAVN artillery continued to pound ARVN positions, two battalions of the 48th crossed into the Iron Triangle on the night of 2/3 June. The fighting at An Dien was especially fierce on 3 June as the PAVN used tanks against ARVN infantry. Armed with light antitank weapons, ARVN infantry knocked out at least four tanks in the final day of the battle. On 4 June, troops of the 18th ARVN Division finally entered An Dien and on the 5th overran the last position of the 95C Regiment, which had since been reinforced by elements of the 271st Regiment. On the morning of the 5th, two battalions of the 48th and two of the 52nd were holding An Dien bracing for a counterattack. One Ranger battalion was in a blocking position north of the destroyed village, while another secured the An Dien bridge. The 43d Regiment was still stalled by the 272nd Regiment's defenses south of An Dien. The 7th Ranger Group had not been able to advance toward Base 82 from the north, and a new major ARVN attack would be required to advance past the positions held in and around An Dien.

PAVN soldiers captured in An Dien told of horrendous losses in the three battalions - the 7th, 8th, and 9th of the 95C Regiment. Fourteen surviving members of the 9th Battalion were captured when the last strongpoint fell on 5 June. They said that casualties in the 8th and 9th Battalions between 16 May and 4 June were 65 percent, that a company of the 7th Battalion had only one man left, that a company of the 8th Battalion was totally destroyed and that the 9th Battalion lost two complete companies. These accounts were confirmed by the large number or bodies left on the battlefield and by the quantity or weapons and equipment captured. ARVN losses were substantial, well over 100 ARVN soldiers had been killed.

The expected PAVN counterattack came on the night of 5/6 June as two battalions of the 271st Regiment, supported by up to 14 tanks attacked from two directions. The ARVN held and its infantrymen knocked out five tanks and damaged five others. The second phase of the Iron Triangle campaign was over with the recapture of An Dien, and Thuần was anxious to get the attack moving again toward Base 82 and Rach Bap. Although the An Dien bridge would soon be in condition to carry the tanks of the 318th Task Force, one company of armored personnel carriers had already crossed into An Dien, a knocked-out T-54 tank blocked the narrow road from the bridge into An Dien. Swampy ground on each side prevented bypassing the tank and it had to be blown off the road with demolitions. ARVN combat engineers were laboring at this task while infantrymen of the 18th Division were holding the perimeter around An Dien.

=== Base 82 ===
The first attempt to retake Base 82 began on 7 June 1974 when the 318th Task Force finally brought its tanks across the Thi Thinh River and passed through the 18th Division position in An Dien. While the 52nd Infantry remained in reserve holding the An Dien perimeter, two battalions of the 48th Infantry moved south and west to protect the southern flank of Task Force 318 as it advanced along Route 7 towards Base 82. To the south, the 43rd Regiment maintained contact with the 272nd Regiment. Meanwhile, the PAVN 9th Division had withdrawn the remnants of the 95C Regiment from action and placed its 271st Regiment at Base 82, where it prepared deep, mutually supporting defensive positions. Clearly indicating its resolve to conduct a determined defense along Route 7 in the Iron Triangle, COSVN sent the 141st Regiment, 7th Division south from its position along Highway 13, north of Lai Khê, to reinforce the 9th Division north of Base 82. The 9th Division meanwhile began shifting the 272nd Regiment north from the southern part of the Iron Triangle to assist in the defense of Base 82 and Rach Bap.

The summer monsoon had arrived in Bình Dương Province and rains and low cloud cover further reduced the effectiveness of RVNAF support for the attack. A dense rubber plantation northwest of Base 82 provided excellent concealment for supporting defensive positions and observation of local Route 7, the only avenue of approach available for ARVN armor. Dense brush covered the southern approaches to the base and concealed more PAVN supporting and reserve positions. The only fairly open terrain was on either side or Route 7 where high grass offered no concealment to the ARVN column but reduced visibility to a few meters. Furthermore, this approach was under the observed fire of the 9th Division's supporting artillery.

By the evening of 8 June, Task Force 318 reached its first objective, Hill 25 (11.1398°N 106.562°E), about 1 km short of Base 82. There it fought a battalion of the 271st Regiment, killing 30 and capturing 10 while taking light casualties. The prospects seemed bright for recapturing Base 82 by the following day and Thuần told Đảo that Rach Bap should be taken by 15 June. But on 10 June Task Force 318, advancing very slowly in two columns, one north of Route 7 and one south was struck by a battalion of the 271st Regiment supported by 4 tanks and a heavy concentration of mortar, howitzer and rocket fire. Four of Task Force 318's tanks and one of its personnel carriers were knocked out but personnel losses were light. By nightfall only 200 meters had been gained, the PAVN's minefields and 82-mm. recoilless guns having stopped the task force 800 meters short of Base 82. No progress was made on 11 June, but ARVN artillery and RVNAF pounded the base. Antiaircraft fire was intense and kept the RVNAF fighter-bombers above their most effective attack altitudes. Meanwhile, Thuần, determined to get the attack moving again, directed Khôi to assemble the 315th Task Force at Bến Cát and send it across the Thi Thinh to reinforce the attack. The 315th was to move southwest and attack Base 82 from the south, while the 318th continued its frontal assault. Farther south, another change was taking place, detecting that all but one of the PAVN 2nd Regiment's battalions had moved north toward Route 7, Đảo left only one of his 43rd Infantry battalions in the Phu Thu area, placing the balance of the regiment in reserve.

By noon on 12 June the 315th Task Force had reached a position about 1,600 meters southeast of Base 82. At this point, Đảo changed the original concept of a two-pronged attack from the east and south. As soon as the 315th was ready to attack, he would withdraw the 318th to defend the eastern approaches to Bến Cát that had been weakened by the commitment of the 315th against Base 82. Thick brush, rough terrain, and accurate PAVN artillery fire prevented the 315th from making any gains on 13 June. In fact, as the 318th withdrew from contact, it left positions much closer to the objective than those reached by the 315th. In another change in plans. Đảo proposed to Thuần that two battalions each from the 43rd and 52nd Regiments take over the attack role, while the 315th remained in its defensive perimeter southeast of Base 82. The infantry battalions would move into the rubber plantation and attack from the north. Thuần agreed and left for Joint General Staff headquarters to ask for a new ammunition allocation for the attack. He returned to his headquarters in ill-humor, for General Đổng Văn Khuyên, the Chief of Logistics, was unable to satisfy this request.

By 15 June, the two leading 43rd Infantry battalions, one of which was attempting to swing north of Base 82 from An Dien, had made very little headway against strong resistance and heavy PAVN artillery fire. In contacts south of Route 7 on the 17th, prisoners were taken from the 272nd Regiment, soldiers who had recently arrived in South Vietnam and had been assigned to the 272nd for only three days before their capture. ARVN casualties continued to mount, troops were desperately fatigued, artillery support was too severely rationed, and the weather all but eliminated effective air support. On 21 June, Thuần ordered a halt in the attempt to take Base 82, while a new approach, better supported by artillery fire, could be devised. Consideration was also given to replacing the 18th Division, whose troops had been in heavy combat for a month, with the 5th Division. Instead of relieving the 18th, Thuần decided to try his armor again. Holding the infantry in position, he sent the 318th and 322nd Task Forces back into the Triangle, one north of Route 7, the other generally along the road. The PAVN's antitank defenses, primarily employing the 82-mm. recoilless gun, stopped the attack once again, destroying 13 M113 armored personnel carriers and 11 M48 tanks between 27 June and 1 July, even though ARVN artillery and the RVNAF supported the attack with 43,000 rounds and 250 sorties. The tired infantrymen of the 43rd Regiment tried once again to take Base 82 from the south on 1 July but got nowhere.

On 2 July, Thuần finally decided to relieve the 18th Division and replace it with the 5th. The armored task forces would be withdrawn for rest and refitting. Thuần allowed his commanders ten days to complete the relief. In order not to weaken the 5th Division's defenses north of Lai Khê, elements of the 18th Division's 52nd Regiment, which had seen little action, and two battalions of the 25th Division's 50th Infantry were attached to the 5th Division in the Iron Triangle. The relief was accomplished on schedule, and a relative calm settled over the Base 82 battleground. The PAVN 9th Division also made adjustments during the last part of June and the first weeks of July. While the 272nd Regiment retained defensive positions in the southern part of the Iron Triangle, the 95C Regiment, refitted and with fresh replacements, returned to the Base 82 area and assumed responsibility for its defense. The 271st Regiment, held defensive positions in the Base 82 area, primarily to the north and northeast. Meanwhile, the 141st Regiment of the 7th Division returned to its normal area of operations north of Lai Khê, and artillery support for the 9th Division was assigned to the 42nd Artillery Regiment. The 75th Artillery Regiment moved from the Bến Cát area to support the 7th Division east of Route 13.

The 5th Division made no determined effort during July or August to alter the status quo. The PAVN, however, pulled the 95C Regiment out of Base 82 and replaced it with the 141st Regiment in time to meet the next concerted ARVN effort to take Base 82. By autumn the 8th Infantry, 5th Division, had been selected to try to capture Base 82, having replaced its sister regiment, the 7th, in the Iron Triangle. Prior to an attack scheduled for 7 September, ARVN reconnaissance patrols had successfully reached the base's perimeter. The 8th Regiment formed a task force around its 1st and 2nd Battalions, reinforced by the 5th Division Reconnaissance Company and a small armored troop with three M41 tanks, three M48 tanks and three M113s. The 1st Battalion advanced south of Route 7, while the 2nd Battalion, with the reconnaissance company and the armored troops, advanced on an axis north of the road. Unopposed and moving quickly the two battalions reached the outer defenses of Base 82 in the early morning of 7 September but could go no further that day. Faced with barbed wire and mines and under fire from the front and flanks, the 8th Infantry dug in. As the rain of PAVN shells continued, much of it heavy 120 mm mortars, the 8th kept digging and improving fighting positions with logs overhead. On 8 September, the PAVN shelling increased, and at 16:00 it began to rain, ending all RVNAF aerial observation and air support. As the rain increased, so did the PAVN bombardment, 1600 rounds falling in one hour, and the battlefield was obscured in smoke. ARVN infantry could hear the approach of tanks. One column of T-54s came out of the rubber plantation and forest to the north, and another line of six advanced from the south. The three ARVN M48s withdrew, and at 18:00, nearly caught in a double envelopment, the 8th Infantry fell back, first about 300 meters where they attempted to establish a new line, then 300 meters farther back where the troops of the 8th rallied and held on the western slope of Hill 25. The PAVN counterattack, involving 15 T-54 tanks, destroyed three M-41 tanks and several M113s. With victory seemingly so close, Thuần was deeply disappointed by the rout of the 8th Regiment, and his disappointment changed to anger when he learned of the relatively light casualties suffered by the 8th: six killed, 29 missing and 67 wounded. But even if the 8th Infantry leaders on the scene could have held their troops in their exposed positions in front of Base 82, the regiment probably could not have survived the PAVN counterattack. In any case, Thuần ordered an immediate investigation of the circumstances of the 8th Infantry's failure and subsequently dismissed the regimental commander.

On 11 September, the 8th Infantry was replaced by the 9th, and all three battalions of the 9th Infantry moved into position on the west slope of Hill 25. Combat losses since the start of the PAVN offensive in May, combined with the slow flow of the replacements into the regiment, had reduced battalion strength to under 300. Between 12 and 18 September, the 9th concentrated on reconnaissance, planning, and improvement of positions. As the 9th Regiment prepared for the attack, the PAVN was beginning to execute another relief in the Bến Cát battlefield. The 141st Regiment made preparations to leave the Base 82 area and turn over its defense once again to the 95C Regiment. With the 2nd Armored Cavalry Squadron protecting the right (north) flank, and two Ranger battalions protecting the left, the 9th Infantry Regiment began its attack toward Base 82. The two attacking battalions, the 3rd Battalion on the right, north of Route 7, and the 2nd on the left, crossed the line of departure on Hill 25 on 19 September. Moving slowly, with excellent reconnaissance and effective artillery support, the ARVN methodically eliminated, one by one, the PAVN's mutually supporting bunkers that lay in a dense pattern all along the route of advance. Although the PAVN defended tenaciously and their artillery support was heavy and accurate, they gradually gave ground. On 29 September, the 1st Battalion relieved the 3rd Battalion, and the attack continued. On 2 October, the 2nd Battalion, 46th Infantry was committed to reinforce the 2nd Battalion, 9th Infantry. Before midnight on 3 October, as PAVN artillery and mortars were still firing heavy barrages, a 12-man assault team from the 1st Battalion, 9th Infantry, attempted to breach the barbed wire and scale the earthen wall. An antipersonnel mine detonated, disclosing the team's position and heavy fire from the base pinned it down. Very early the next morning, the PAVN counterattacked, forcing the withdrawal of the assault team. But it became apparent to the ARVN commander on the ground that victory was within grasp. A 100-round concentration of 155-mm. howitzer fire which he requested, had the desired effect: PAVN resistance and return fire was notably diminished by 13:00, and 30 minutes later PAVN infantrymen were seen climbing out of their crumbling fortress and running to the rear. At 15:00 on 4 October the 1st Battalion, 9th Regiment, raised South Vietnam's flag over Base 82, ending a bitter four-month struggle.

=== Rach Bap ===
Following the withdrawal from Base 82 COSVN organized a new corps headquarters in the Tay Ninh- Binh Long region and designated it the 301st Corps. This corps would soon direct the combat operations of the 7th and 9th Divisions, separate regiments, and additional formations already en route from North Vietnam. Meanwhile, Thuần decided to rest the tired troops of the 5th Division and turned his attention to sending his 25th Division to clear out the PAVN bases in the Ho Bo area west of the Iron Triangle. The ARVN defenses around An Dien and Base 82 were taken over by Regional Forces and Rangers. III Corps Headquarters worked on plans to resume the attack to retake Rach Bap, the last outpost still remaining in PAVN hands. Thuần also recognized the need to clean the PAVN out of the southern part of the Iron Triangle around Phu Thu, and a plan encompassing Rach Bap, Phu Thu and the Phú Hòa area west of the Iron Triangle began to take shape. But on 30 October, before the execution of the plan, President Thieu relieved Thuần of command of III Corps and replaced him with Lieutenant general Dư Quốc Đống.

Đống immediately surveyed the situation in the Iron Triangle and reviewed the plan of his predecessor, which as modified became Operation Quyet Thang 18/24 (Will to Victory). Battalions from all three divisions of the Corps were committed; D-Day was 14 November. The 9th Infantry, 5th Division started from An Dien and marched west, along Route 7, past Base 82 toward Rach Bap. The 48th and 52nd Regiments, 18th Division crossed the Thi Thinh River south of Ben Cat and entered the Iron Triangle and attacked west toward the Saigon River. Elements of the 50th Infantry, 25th Division, were already in this area. Meanwhile, the 46th Infantry and one battalion of the 50th moved into the plantations north of Phú Hòa District Town to prevent PAVN infiltration across the Saigon River. Along Route 7, the 9th Infantry advanced without incident until 19 November when sharp fighting west of Base 82 resulted in over 40 ARVN soldiers wounded. The PAVN withdrew leaving 14 dead and many weapons and radios behind. The next morning, Reconnaissance Company, 9th Infantry, entered Rach Bap unopposed. The Iron Triangle campaign was virtually over, although mopping-up operations continued in the south along Route 14 until 24 November. Measured against the costs and violence of the earlier phases of the campaign, this final chapter was anticlimactic. Casualties on both sides were light, and contacts were few and of short duration. The PAVN had given up its last foothold in the Iron Triangle with only token resistance in order to replace losses, reorganize, re-equip and retrain the main forces of the new 301st Corps for the decisive battles to come.

== Aftermath ==
The drawn out fighting over the small battlefield of the Iron Triangle, while ending in South Vietnamese victory, showed that the North Vietnamese had achieved combat parity and were pushing against the ARVN's outer line of defense around Saigon.
