= Battle of Phước Long =

Part of the Vietnam War (1974–1975)

Battle of Phuoc Long
- Part of the Vietnam War
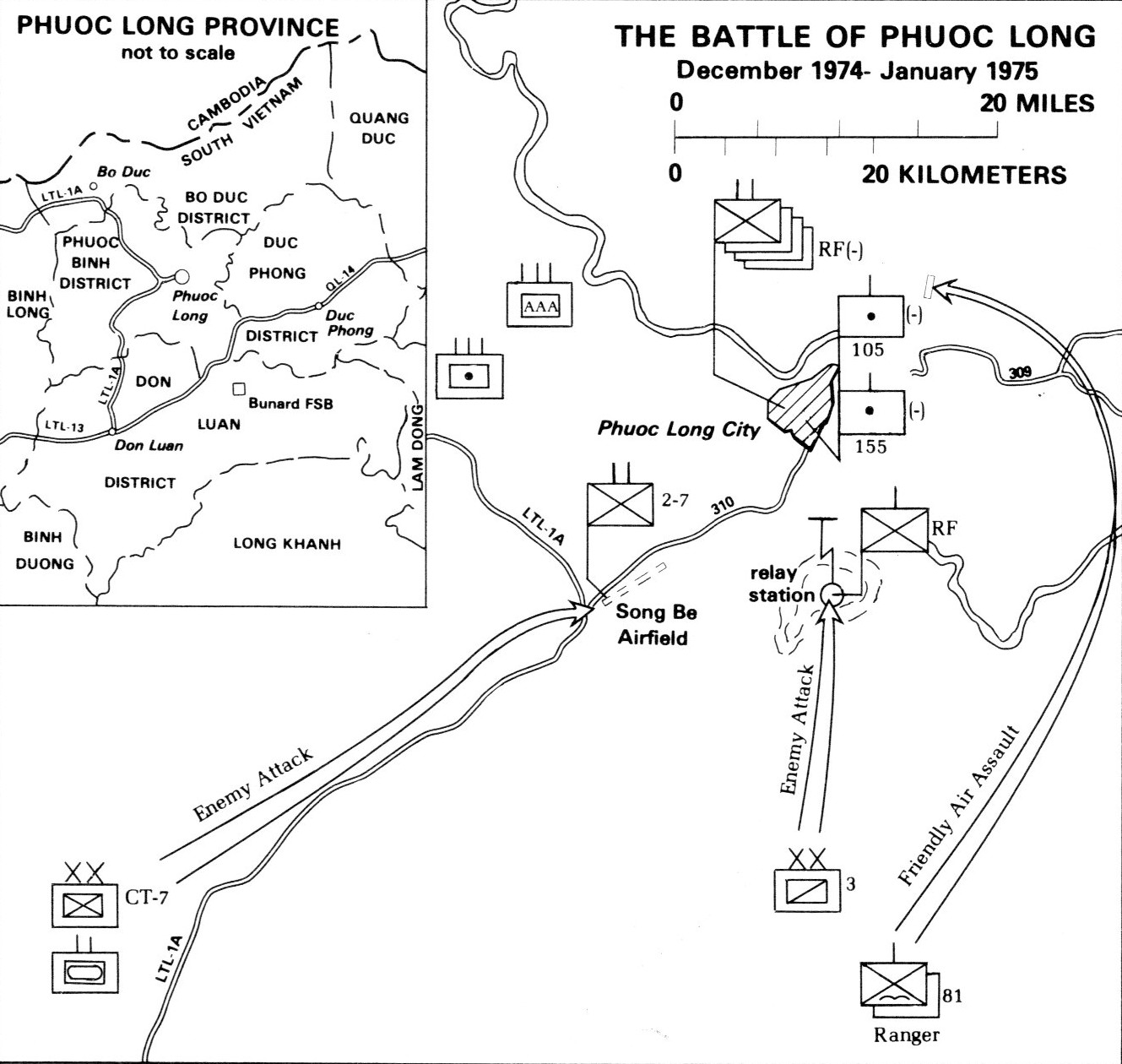
Date	12 December 1974 – 6 January 1975 (3 weeks and 4 days)
Location	11°51′3″N 106°59′48″E; Phước Long Province, South Vietnam (now Bình Phước Province)
Result	North Vietnamese victory

Belligerents
North Vietnam	South Vietnam

Commanders and leaders
Hoàng Cầm	Nguyễn Thống Thành; Dư Quốc Đống

Units involved
4th Corps: 7th Infantry Division; 165th Regiment; 141st Regiment; 209th Regiment; 9th Infantry Division; 1st Regiment; 2nd Regiment; B2 Front Command: 3rd Division (Phước Long); 201st Regiment; 271st Regiment; 429th Commando Regt; 16th Infantry Regt; Supported by: 25th Engineer Group; 210th Logistical Group; 235th Logistical Group	III Corps: 5th Infantry Division; 1/7th Battalion; 2/7th Battalion; 1/9th Battalion; Regional Forces; 340th Battalion; 341st Battalion; 352nd Battalion; 362nd Battalion; 363rd Battalion; Reinforcements: ARVN Special Forces: 81st Airborne Ranger Group; Supported by Republic of Vietnam Air Force: 3rd Air Division (Biên Hòa Air Base)

Strength
14,500	In Phước Long: 5,400; Surrounding areas: 2,400; Total: 7,800 soldiers

Casualties and losses
U.S. estimate: 2,000–2,300 killed or wounded Vietnamese figure: ~500 killed, 1,224 wounded	1,160 killed, 2,000+ wounded 2,444 captured

The Battle of Phước Long was a decisive battle of the Vietnam War which began on 12 December 1974, and concluded on 6 January 1975. The battle involved the deployment of the People's Army of Vietnam (PAVN) 4th Army Corps for the first time, against units of the Army of the Republic of Vietnam (ARVN) in Phước Long in Bình Phước Province near the Cambodian border (to be distinguished from the other Phước Long in Bạc Liêu Province, south of Saigon), under the command of Lieutenant General Dư Quốc Đống.

On 12 December 1974, the PAVN 4th Army Corps launched their campaign against Phước Long aiming to achieve three key objectives. Firstly, North Vietnamese leaders wanted to test the reaction of the United States Government, to see if they would actually uphold former President Richard Nixon's promises of military retaliation against North Vietnam; secondly, PAVN field commanders wanted to test the combat readiness of the ARVN; and thirdly, the North Vietnamese wanted to solve their logistical problems once and for all, by capturing the district of Phước Long and the important transportation routes around it.

The PAVN campaign proved to be a major success, because the fall of Phước Long showed that the involvement of the United States in the Vietnam War was truly over, especially when the United States Congress repeatedly voted against additional aid for South Vietnam. Militarily, the victory at Phước Long also enabled the North Vietnamese to expand their logistical routes from the Central Highlands to the Mekong Delta, which placed enormous pressure on the South Vietnamese military.

== Background ==
During the Vietnam War, the district of Phước Long played an important role in the defensive posture of the ARVN. Phước Long is about 120 km north of Saigon; it shared a border with the South Vietnamese districts of Bình Long in the west, Quảng Đức in the east, and Long Khánh in the south. Phước Long also shares an international border with Cambodia. The district of Phước Long and the military zones of Bố Đức, Đôn Luân, Đức Phong, the administrative centre of Phước Bình, and Bà Rá mountain lay at the centre of South Vietnam's defensive line in III Corps, which served to defend Saigon and the populous southern provinces.

Route 14, which ran through the district of Phước Long and other key military zones, was an important North Vietnamese transportation route which linked the Ho Chi Minh trail with other PAVN-occupied territories in South Vietnam. For that reason, regular units of the ARVN in Phước Long were able to disrupt North Vietnamese supply lines. Due to the vulnerability of their supply lines in Phước Long and the surrounding areas, the PAVN in Lộc Ninh and in the Central Highlands, often found themselves isolated from their units in the southern provinces of South Vietnam.

The PAVN had closed surface travel from Saigon to Phước Long by the direct route through Bình Dương Province, during the Easter Offensive in 1972 and the only land access available to the South Vietnamese was via Ban Me Thuot and Quảng Đức. The PAVN attempted to sever this route during the Battle of Quang Duc from 30 October to 10 December 1973, but were repulsed by the ARVN.

== Combatants ==
=== North Vietnam ===
On 20 July 1974, the PAVN High Command created the 4th Army Corps for the purpose of capturing Phước Long from the opposing South Vietnamese. Major general Hoàng Cầm was appointed as the first commander of the 4th Army Corps. The main body of the 4th Army Corps included the 7th Infantry Division and the 9th Infantry Division. The 7th Division sent its 165th Regiment out to support the 3rd Division, and got the 2nd Regiment from the 9th Division into its combat formation. In addition, the aforementioned units were supported by B2 Front Command forces included the 429th Commando Regiment, the 25th Engineers Regiment, the 210th and 235th Logistical Groups.

The North Vietnamese campaign against Phước Long was planned to take place in two separate phases. In the first phase PAVN forces would capture the military zones surrounding Phước Long which included Bù Đăng, Bu Na, Bo Duc, Duc Phong, Đôn Luân, and ARVN firebases around Bà Rá mountain. In the second phase PAVN units would launch a frontal assault, aimed directly at the district of Phước Long, the administrative centre of Phước Binh and the strategically important Bà Rá mountain. In both phases of operation, the PAVN would have to secure Route 14 in order to prevent reinforcements, which could have come in the form of the ARVN 5th, 18th or 25th Infantry Divisions.

=== South Vietnam ===
South Vietnam's main defensive assets in and around Phước Long included five security battalions and 48 platoons of civilian self-defence forces. The defence of Phước Long was the responsibility of ARVN Lieutenant general Dư Quốc Đống. The 341st and 352nd Security Battalions were tasked with the defence of Đôn Luân, the 363rd Security Battalion stationed at Bu Na, the 362nd Security Battalion guard the main roads from Vinh Thuan to Bù Đăng, and the 340th Security Battalion was placed in reserve at Phước Long district. The 341st, 352nd and 363rd Security Battalions all shared the responsibility of protecting Route 14 and the adjoining roads. Firepower support came in the form of one artillery battalion, which was based at the centre of Phước Long District, equipped with 105 mm and 155 mm artillery guns.

Like during the Easter Offensive the strongest units of the ARVN in III Corps could be deployed to defend Phước Long from potential attacks, which included three infantry divisions (5th, 18th and 25th) and two armoured units (2nd and 7th Armoured Brigade). In an emergency the 18th Infantry Division based at Biên Hòa could reach Phước Long in the shortest period of time, and the next closest unit was the 5th Infantry Division based at Bến Cát. In addition, Đống could have access to the 81st Airborne Ranger Battalion and more than 100 helicopters, mainly UH-1 Huey and CH-47 Chinook models. While air support could come in the form of fighter-bombers from the 3rd and 5th Air Divisions of the Republic of Vietnam Air Force (RVNAF), based at Tan Son Nhut Air Base and Bien Hoa Air Base.

== Prelude ==
The PAVN opened its campaign against Phước Long on 12 December 1974, using the 4th Battalion of the 165th Infantry Regiment to attack a South Vietnamese outpost located on Route 14, which was defended by a single South Vietnamese security company. On the same night the military zone of Bù Đốp was also attacked by a company of Viet Cong (VC) special forces from the Phước Bình area. During the next few days the ARVN managed to recapture its positions along Route 14, but they could not clear the main road. On 13 December ARVN Colonel Nguyễn Thống Thành inspected the Route 14 area, and decided to raise the level of alertness from code 'yellow' to 'orange' for all South Vietnamese installations in the area. Due to the heavy rain which flooded the main roads leading to Phước Long, the PAVN decided to postpone further attacks which were planned to take place on 13 December.

On 14 December, the 271st Regiment of the PAVN 3rd Division launched their attack on the ARVN 362nd Security Battalion, also based in Bù Đốp. After two hours of fighting nearly all members of the 2/271st Regiment had managed to penetrate the South Vietnamese defensive line around Bù Đốp, and by 11:30 the 271st Regiment successfully overwhelmed the Bù Đốp military zone. On the same day, after a night of encirclement, the PAVN 165th and 201st Regiments, both drawn from the 7th Infantry Division, established control over the Vinh Thien area and the Bù Đăng administrative centre after more than two hours of fighting.

On 15 December, soldiers from the PAVN 429th Special Forces Regiment attacked Bu Na, which was defended by one ARVN company from the 363rd Security Battalion, and an artillery platoon. The 363rd Security Battalion, with strong support from RVNAF fighter-bombers based at Bien Hoa Air Base, fought back fiercely in their attempt to defend Bu Na. However, by the end of the day South Vietnamese defenders around Bu Na gave up, when reinforcements from Phước Long failed to arrive due to the closure of Route 14 by the PAVN. On 16 December, Đống flew out to Phước Long to assess the situation around the area, and to bolster the defences of Phước Long with the 2/7th Battalion, from the ARVN 5th Infantry Division. On the same day, South Vietnamese Colonel Do Cong Thanh also organised a number of counter-attacks against North Vietnamese positions around Route 14, which connects with the Bù Đăng area, but on each on occasion they were pushed back by local VC units who were guarding the area.

On 22 December the ARVN 341st Security Battalion at Bố Đức was attacked for the second time by the PAVN 165th Regiment. Subsequently, South Vietnamese units at Phước Tín, Phước Quả, and Phước Lộc were also overwhelmed by the PAVN. The ARVN attempted to stage a counter-attack on Bo Duc, but they were defeated by the PAVN 6/165th Regiment, as a result all surviving South Vietnamese units retreated back to the Bà Rá area. Two days later Đống tried to reinforce Phước Long with a regiment from the ARVN 18th Infantry Division, but President Nguyễn Văn Thiệu overturned Đống's decision on the basis that all deployments at the regimental-level must be made by Thiệu himself. As a result, Đống had to order Brigadier general Lê Nguyên Vỹ to reinforce the areas around Đôn Luân with units taken from the ARVN 5th Infantry Division. However, by the time regular ARVN units arrived at their destination, the PAVN had already encircled the Đôn Luân military zone, so it was within range of the formidable PAVN long-range artillery guns. Even though the ARVN received extensive air support they could only send one company into Đôn Luân, so Vỹ was forced to withdraw his forces from the area.

At 05:37 on 26 December the PAVN 141st Regiment opened their attack on the ARVN base at Đôn Luân from four different directions, after 15 minutes of artillery bombardment from supporting artillery units. Due to the strong presence of PAVN artillery, ARVN artillery units at Đôn Luân were simply overwhelmed. In addition, the high calibre anti-aircraft guns used by the PAVN 20th Air-Defence Battalion also limited the effectiveness of the RVNAF air support. At 10:30 all ARVN units at Đôn Luân capitulated and Major Đặng Vũ Khoái, commander of the 352nd Security Battalion, was captured at Suoi Rat along with his junior officers. Towards the end of the day, the PAVN 141st Regiment also captured other South Vietnamese installations at Ta Be, Phước Thiền and a helicopter base.

In just two weeks the PAVN had managed to punch several holes in the defensive line of South Vietnam's III Corps, with the capture of Bù Đốp, Bù Na, Bù Đăng and Đôn Luân. For the ARVN, the loss of four important outposts in III Corps was a severe blow, especially with PAVN forces controlling all main roads leading to the district of Phước Long such as Route 14, Route 7, and the provincial roads 1 and 2. The ARVN, based at the administrative centre of Phước Bình and Phước Long, suddenly found themselves surrounded by the PAVN 4th Army Corps.

== Fall of Phước Long ==
To halt the North Vietnamese onslaught at Phước Long, Đống needed at least one infantry division and one unit of armored cavalry; however, ARVN infantry divisions based in III Corps were not allowed to be deployed without the approval of Thiệu. On 29 December realizing that the district of Phước Long was in serious danger of being overrun, General Cao Văn Viên asked Thiệu to approve a plan to defend Phước Long that had been prepared back in October 1974. Shortly afterwards Viên received a message from Thiệu which advised Đống not to make discretionary decisions, and to try to maintain the morale of the South Vietnamese soldiers at Phước Long.

While Đống was desperate to find additional reinforcements, the North Vietnamese were making their way towards Phước Long and Phước Bình between 27 and 30 December. On the afternoon of 30 December, PAVN units took up their positions in the following order: the 165th Regiment was positioned on the south and south-eastern areas of Phước Bình, the 141st Regiment was positioned along provincial road no. 2 in the north and northwest leading towards Phước Bình, the 271st Regiment blocked Route 309, the 16th Regiment moved from Tây Ninh to the north of Song Be, the 78th Special Forces Battalion gathered near the foot of Bà Rá Mountain, while the 2nd and 209th Regiments were placed in reserve. In addition the PAVN 4th Army Corps was strengthened with one artillery company equipped with 130 mm artillery guns, and two armored companies with 14 T-54 tanks.

On 31 December, as Đống received Thiệu's message, the PAVN began their final assault on the district of Phước Long with the 165th Regiment, the 141st Regiment, the 3rd Battalion and several local VC units leading the attack. However, due to the slow deployment of the 78th Special Forces Battalion and the 271st Regiment, ARVN artillery at Phước Long were able to respond to initial PAVN assaults, by pounding PAVN positions around Bà Rá Mountain. Furthermore, the ARVN 1/7th Battalion, 5th Infantry Division, also attacked the PAVN 5th and 6th Battalions, both belonging to the 165th Regiment, at the foot of Bà Rá Mountain. As a result, the 141st Regiment had to attack the administrative center of Phước Bình by itself, while 165th Regiment was forced to stop in order to deal with the South Vietnamese counter-attack. At 13:00 Cầm sent four T-54 tanks to support the 141st Regiment, but one of the tanks was put out of action when it hit a landmine. The 141st Regiment, with three remaining T-54 tanks in support, were able to force their way into the center of Phước Bình and capture the local airfield. By 15:00, the administrative center of Phước Bình had fallen, and the ARVN 2/7th Battalion was pushed back towards Dung Stream.

Meanwhile, on the evening of 31 December, the RVNAF had flown more than 50 bombing sorties against PAVN positions at the foot of Bà Rá Mountain, temporarily stopping attacks from the PAVN 78th Special Forces Battalion. The PAVN responded to RVNAF attacks by rolling out their long-range anti-aircraft guns, which stopped RVNAF pilots from hitting PAVN positions until the next day, and allowing the 78th Special Forces Battalion to capture Bà Rá Mountain. The capture of Bà Rá Mountain enabled PAVN units to occupy the high ground areas surrounding Phước Long, where they could direct artillery fire against ARVN positions. Throughout the day on 1 January 1975, the RVNAF conducted a further 53 bombing sorties, again temporarily delaying the PAVN attack on Phước Long. By the end of the day, RVNAF pilots claimed to have destroyed 15 PAVN tanks. On the other side, the ARVN lost eight 105 mm and four 155 mm artillery guns during the initial PAVN assault on Phước Bình, and, by the early hours of 2 January, all of Phước Long was within range of PAVN artillery.

Realizing that the South Vietnamese defenders were in danger of being destroyed, ARVN Colonel Do Cong Thanh quickly reorganized all his units. Subsequently, the headquarters of Phước Long district was moved to Camp Le Loi, the 340th Security Battalion had to defend the bridges at Dung Stream, and the 2/7th Battalion took up their positions along the main streets of Tu Hien 1 and Tu Hien 2. As a result, the South Vietnamese were able to put up fierce resistance, thus delaying the advancing PAVN for another 24 hours. On the morning of 2 January PAVN artillery bombarded ARVN positions in Phước Long for about an hour, to pave the way for further assaults from the 141st, 165th and 271st Regiments. In the south of Phước Long, the 165th Regiment successfully captured the ARVN camp of Doan Van Kieu, in the west the 141st Regiment clashed with the ARVN 1/9th Battalion at Ho Long Thuy, and in the southeast the 271st Regiment were able to secure Tu Hien 1 and Tu Hien 2.

On the morning of 3 January elements of the 141st Regiment made their way into the district of Phước Long, only to find the town isolated. The PAVN 4th Army Corps then decided to bolster the strength of the 141st Regiment, with one battalion taken from the 201st Regiment. To deal with the PAVN, Đống attempted to land the 8/5th Infantry Division in the district of Phước Long using helicopters, but fierce anti-aircraft fire from the PAVN 210th Air-Defense Regiment forced the helicopters to turn around. At the same time, RVNAF transport planes also tried to drop ammunition supplies for ARVN soldiers in the northern areas of Phước Long, but the ammunition load landed in the wrong place and was captured by the PAVN. Due to the heavy artillery barrage, the ARVN headquarters at Phước Long was heavily damaged with the district's deputy commander dead of his wounds, while the commander of Phước Bình suffered severe injuries.

On the morning of 4 January the RVNAF resumed their attacks on PAVN columns, forcing them to slow their attacks. In his last-ditch effort to save Phước Long, Đống ordered the 81st Ranger Battalion to be airlifted into action. But as soon as the first group of the 81st Ranger Battalion landed on Dac Song, they were quickly decimated by PAVN artillery, with the unit suffering losses equivalent to two companies. The PAVN 4th Army Corps command immediately responded by ordering the 16th Regiment to secure Dac Song and the nearby bridge at Dac Lung, pursuing the surviving elements of the 81st Ranger Battalion. However, by that stage South Vietnamese defense lines in Phước Long had narrowed, leaving only the administrative center and the local markets still under South Vietnamese control, while most of the town had fallen to the PAVN.

On 5 January the PAVN 165th and 201st Regiments continued their encirclement of the Phước Long administrative center, as well as shelling key targets in the area. On the following day, the PAVN 4th Army Corps command sent the 201st Regiment, along with ten additional tanks, to reinforce the units already fighting in Phước Long and to cut off the South Vietnamese route of escape, Cach Mang and Dinh Tien Hoang streets were blocked. At 20:00 on 6 January the last ARVN defensive post, occupied by the surviving elements of the 81st Ranger Battalion, was captured by the PAVN. During the night a small number of ARVN soldiers who had survived the battle were evacuated from Phước Long. At the battle's conclusion, the North Vietnamese claimed they had captured 2,444 prisoners, including 26 officers, 5,000 small arms of various kinds and more than 1 million rounds of ammunition.

== Aftermath ==
=== Military effect ===
The ARVN in Phước Long used everything they had at their disposal in order to stop the PAVN onslaught. In their efforts to save Phước Long and other territories around the district, the South Vietnamese lost more than 1,000 killed in action and 2,444 others were captured. The sacrifice of the ARVN in the battle was exemplified by the 250-man 81st Airborne Ranger Battalion, which lost more than 150 soldiers in their last-ditch effort to save Phước Long. In the end, about 850 South Vietnamese soldiers were evacuated from the battlefield.

The PAVN 4th Army Corps lost about 1,300 killed or wounded. In logistical terms the victory at Phước Long enabled the PAVN to connect their supply lines from the Ho Chi Minh Trail with bases in the Central Highlands and the Mekong Delta. At the same time, with a strengthened supply line which stretched from the north to the southern provinces of South Vietnam, the PAVN were able to apply additional pressure on the weakened ARVN already starved of American supplies.

=== Political effect ===
In Hanoi, the capture of Phước Long provided the Communist leadership with clear answers about America's commitment to defend South Vietnam, as well as their willingness to re-enter the conflict. The Battle of Phước Long not only gave North Vietnamese political and military planners a greater awareness of South Vietnam's dire military situation, but it also showed that the United States government were no longer interested in the survival of South Vietnam. Thus, the optimism and confidence of the Hanoi regime was significantly strengthened, because they could finally destroy South Vietnam and win the war once and for all. The lessons learned at Phước Long were put into practice during the 1975 Spring Offensive, which ultimately led to the capitulation of South Vietnam on 30 April 1975.

In Saigon, the loss of Phước Long exposed the severe weaknesses of the ARVN. For Viên the military situation was clear: if South Vietnamese units could not hold their own against a single attack, there was no way they could ever stop a large-scale invasion. To make matters worse, the United States Congress repeatedly voted against President Gerald Ford's request to give additional aid for South Vietnam. On 10 January 1975, Thiệu called on the people of South Vietnam to pray for Phước Long, as well as renew their determination to retake the district. One month later, Thiệu reinforced his previous message by asking the people of South Vietnam to maximise their support of soldiers on the frontline, stabilise the country's internal situation, and increase economic production.
