= Nguyễn Văn Hiếu =

South Vietnamese army general (1929–1975)

- Born: 23 June 1929; Tianjin, China
- Died: 8 April 1975 (aged 45); Biên Hòa, South Vietnam
- Burial place: Biên Hòa Military Cemetery
- Military career
- Allegiance: State of Vietnam; South Vietnam
- Branch: National Army of Vietnam; Army of the Republic of Vietnam
- Service years: 1950–1975
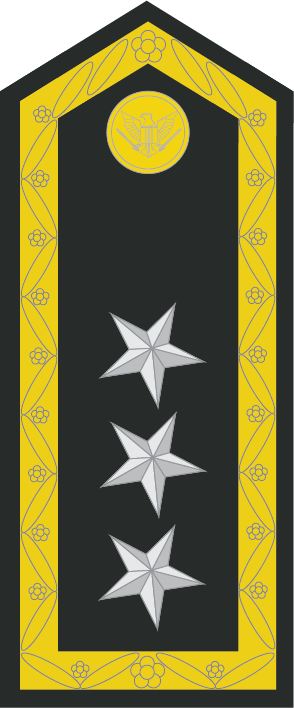
- Rank: Lieutenant General (Trung Tướng)
- Conflicts: Vietnam War: Operation Quyet Thang 202; Siege of Plei Me; Battle of Snuol; Battle of Svay Rieng; 1975 Spring Offensive

Major General Nguyễn Văn Hiếu (23 June 1929 – 8 April 1975) was a general in the South Vietnamese Army of the Republic of Vietnam (ARVN). As a child he lived in Shanghai. He later emigrated with his Vietnamese parents to Saigon when the Chinese Communist Party took over China in 1949. He attended Aurore University in Shanghai, China. In 1950, he attended the Vietnamese Military Academy, graduating second in his class in 1951. In 1963, he graduated from Command and General Staff College, at Fort Leavenworth, Kansas.

His assignments included G3/Joint General Staff, G3/I Corps, Chief of Staff of 1st Division, Chief of Staff of I Corps, Chief of Staff of II Corps, Commander of 22nd Division, Chief of Staff of II Corps, Commander of 5th Division, Deputy Commander of I Corps, Minister of Anti-Corruption under Vice-president Trần Văn Hương, Deputy Commander of III Corps, Commander of Forward HQ III Corps and MG Deputy Commander of III Corps. He was found dead on 8 April 1975 at III Corps Headquarters, Biên Hòa, and theories that he had been assassinated emerged. Two days later, he was posthumously promoted to lieutenant general.

== Military career ==
=== 1964 ===
Hiếu, II Corps Chief of Staff, designed and executed Operation Quyết Thắng (Sure Win) 202 aiming directly at the Viet Cong (VC) stronghold at Đỗ Xá (15.177°N 108.078°E), deep in the Annamite Mountains, at the junction of Kon Tum, Quảng Ngãi and Quảng Tin provinces, from 27 April to 27 May 1964. Units of 50th Regiment, 25th Division participated under the command of Major Phan Trong Trinh, four Ranger battalions under the command of Major Son Thuong and one Airborne battalion under the command of Captain Ngô Quang Trưởng.

Troops were ferried to two landing zones by three helicopters squadrons: USMC HMM-364 Squadron, 117th and 119th squadron of US Army 52nd Aviation Battalion. The VC attacked the helicopters at the landing zones during the two first days, and then vanished into the mountains, avoiding contacts with the invading troops. Operation Đỗ Xá achieved the following results: a communication network of the VC command composed of five stations was destroyed, one of which was used to communicate with North Vietnam, and the other four to link with provincial VC units; the VC lost 62 killed, 17 captured, two 0.51 caliber machine guns, one 0.30 caliber machine gun, 69 individual weapons, and a large quantity of mines and grenades, engineer equipment, explosives, medicine, and documents; in addition, 185 structures, 17 tons of food and 292 acres (1.18 km^{2}) of crops were destroyed.

=== 1965 ===
In 1965, the VC attacked all over the Central Highlands in the II Military Region. In early July 1965, three People's Army of Vietnam (PAVN) regiments (including 32nd and possibly the 33rd) completely isolated the Central Highlands. ARVN units could not use National Routes 1, 11, 14, 19 and 21, and all resupplies to the Highlands had to be performed by air. On 8 July 1965 Hiếu, II Corps Chief of Staff, was entrusted with the design and execution of a plan to reopen National Route 19.

Contrary to the general practice of a road-clearing operation by concentrating troops to progressively destroy the ambushes set up by the enemy along the highway, from D-6 to D+2, Hiếu ordered the 22nd Division and the 3rd Armored Squadron to attack from Qui Nhơn to Tuy Hòa along National Route 1; the 2nd Airborne Task Force together with Regional Forces and Civilian Irregulars Defense Group Forces to retake Lê Thành District; VNMC Alpha Task Force and the 42nd Regiment to attack from Pleiku up north to Đak Sut on National Route 14; and the 20th Engineer Group to attack from Phú Bổn to Tuy Hòa to repair Interprovincial Route 7.

After sowing confusion among the enemy, Hiếu "press[ed] the Viet Cong from three directions with movements launched from Pleiku and Qui Nhơn and a vertical envelopment from north of An Khê. These maneuvers were executed by a task force of the Pleiku sector departing from Pleiku, two task forces of the 22nd Infantry Division departing from Qui Nhơn, and a task force of two airborne battalions heliborne into northern An Khê and attacking south with Task Force Alpha of the marines brigade conducting the linkup." These actions resulted in the free flow of cargo convoys during 5 days from D+3 to D+7, "allowing an initial buildup of 5,365 tons of supplies in Pleiku". Later, operational units withdrew to their camps during D+8 and D+9. As a result of Operation Thần Phong, "the convoys transfused new life into the Highlands. Along with an immediate drop of 25 to 30 percent in the price of food and commodities, the population regained their feelings of security, confidence, and hope. Schoolboys in Pleiku voluntarily helped the troops in unloading the cargoes, and people who had started to evacuate now returned to their homesteads."

==== Pleime ====
After the unsuccessful attempt to overcome the Đức Cơ Special Forces camp in August 1965, General Võ Nguyên Giáp launched the Winter Spring Campaign aiming at cutting South Vietnam in two, from Pleiku in the Central Highlands to Qui Nhơn in the coastal regions. The plan of General Chu Huy Man, VC Field Commander was as follows:

1. PAVN 33rd Regiment feigns to attack Plei Me Camp to entice II Corps to dispatch relief column from Pleiku;
2. PAVN 32nd Regiment sets an ambush to destroy the relief column (an easy target without artillery support nearby);
3. after destroying the relief column, 32nd Regiment joins up with 33rd Regiment in overcoming Plei Me Camp;
4. in the meantime, with the defense of Pleiku weakened by the troops sent out to rescue Plei Me, PAVN 66th Regiment initiates a preliminary attack against II Corps HQ, awaiting 32nd and 33rd Regiments to overcome Plei Me and to join forces to attack and occupy Pleiku.

Hiếu consulted with the US 1st Cavalry Division and came up with the following plan:

1. II Corps feigns biting the bait by reinforcing Plei Me with a unit of ARVN Airborne Rangers and dispatches a task force from Pleiku to relieve Plei Me;
2. 1st Cavalry Division lends a brigade to reinforce the defense of Pleiku and heli-lifts artillery batteries to several locations near the ambush site to support the relief column when under attacked.

This plan neutralized the PAVN 66th Regiment, which remained inactive in the Chư Prông area, destroyed the PAVN 33rd Regiment at the ambush site and the PAVN 32nd Regiment abandoned the siege of Plei Me and withdrew into the surrounding jungle.

=== 1966 ===
42nd Regiment, 22nd Division, reinforced by 3rd Airborne Task Force established a blocking position on the mountain side, joined force with an armored squadron of M113s in sweeping the enemy from National Route 1 into the mountains at Phù Cũ Pass in Bình Định Province. Infantrymen following the M113s launched fierce assaults, after an initial salvo of artillery. Airborne Task Force Commander, Lieutenant Colonel Nguyễn Khoa Nam observing the battle from the mountainside with binocular stated: "Colonel Hiếu conducts his troops like a seasoned 'armor officer', and combatants of 22nd Division fought as elegantly as our paratroopers."

=== 1967 ===
In February 1967, Hiếu launched Operation Đại Bàng 800. For three days prior to Vietnamese operation, units of the US 1st Cavalry Division were unsuccessful in discovering the enemy in their operational areas. Hiếu lured the enemy by dispatching a reduced regiment to set up an overnight camp in Phù Mỹ, knowing that enemy spies amongst the indigenous farmers would report the status of the operational troops. Hiếu positioned a motorized infantry battalion and an armored unit 10 kilometers away. Thinking they had an easy target, the enemy attacked the camp with a regiment belonging to the PAVN 3rd Division at 2:00 a.m. Alerted by the regiment's commander, Hiếu sent in the reserve forces to cut off the enemy's retreat and join forces with the defenders. After a three-hour fierce battle, the enemy reportedly left behind more than 300 dead and numerous weapons.

=== 1968-9 ===
Whenever Hiếu wished to organize mobile operations with his 40th Infantry Regiment or his 41st Infantry Regiment, he had to negotiate with the powerful Binh Dinh Province chief, Lt. Col. Phan Minh Tho, who used those same units to support the pacification program. The relationship between the two officers, I Field Force, Vietnam commander General William R. Peers called it a "vendetta", had been simmering for years, and to make matters worse, both of Hiếu's regimental commanders enjoyed a close relationship with Tho. The result was a pair of regiments that rarely sought the enemy. In August 1968 Peers warned the Corps' commander, General Lữ Mộng Lan, that security in northern Binh Dinh Province was "regressing" because Hiếu refused to challenge his long-serving regimental commanders, "who are acting like small time warlords."

In August 1969 General Le Ngoc Trien replaced Hiếu as commander of the 22nd Division and Hiếu replaced the inept, but politically connected General Phạm Quốc Thuần as commander of the 5th Division, however US officials had major reservations about this replacement, not regarding Hiếu as a dynamic leader.

=== 1970 ===
From May to July 1970, the 5th Division participated in the Cambodian Campaign with Operation Total Victory 46 in the Fishhook area, north of Lộc Ninh. This base area was considered to be used by the PAVN 5th Division as a headquarters location and training area and the 70th Rear Service Group which moved supplies down the Serges Jungle Highway. Elements of the PAVN 5th Division were identified along with elements of the 70th Rear Service Group and its affiliated hospitals. The division's mission was to attack and destroy the 70th and 80th Rear Service Groups: one hospital and one training center. Division elements will locate and destroy or evacuate enemy foods, ammunition, weapons and medical caches in the operational area. In preparation for the operation Hiếu with his G3, the CDAT commander and the DCAT G3 made the initial area coordination with General Casey of the 1st Cavalry Division and his G3. Upon completion of this initial coordination the Assistant Division Commander of the 5th Division, Commanding Officer of the 9th Regiment, and the DCAT G3 effected direct coordination with the 11th Armored Cavalry Regiment. During the operation coordination was made by the 9th Regimental Commander and his DCAT Commander for the joint occupation of Fire Support Base Gonder by elements of the 9th Regiment and the 1st Cavalry Division. Operation Total Victory 46 was conducted in 5 phases. Phase I was the attack phase. Phase II, III and IV were search and destroy phases. Phase V was the withdrawal phase.

In mid-1970 MACV rated General Hiếu as "unsatisfactory" and recommended his relief as commander of the 5th Division.

==== Toàn Thắng 8/B/5 ====
The 5th Division was notified by III Corps Headquarters on 14 October 1970, to prepare for limited combat operations in the Snuol District of Cambodia, for the purpose of destroying enemy forces, installations, and obtaining enemy information. Operation Total Victory 8/B/9 was conducted from 23 October to 10 November 1970 against the PAVN 5th Division: 174 Regiment, 275 Regiment, Z27 Recon Battalion; Rear Service Group 86, C11 (medical); C1/K2 Guerrilla force, northwest of Snuol; Guerrilla force, Snuol Town Market; Guerrilla force, K'bai Trach, southwest of Snuol. Hiếu together with his G3 Staff, was in charge of planning the details of the whole operation. The operational Task Organization was composed of 3 Task Forces: TF1 (Commanded by CO, 1st ACR), TF9 (Commanded by CO, 9th Regiment) and TF333 (Commanded by CO, 3rd Ranger GP). TF333 was entrusted the protection and security of the main supply route. The Division Operation Plan was approved by III Corps on 21 October 1970. A final coordination meeting was conducted on 22 October 1970 at Lai Khê, and was attended by all commanders involved. Operation Total Victory 8/B/5 was composed of 3 phases. Phase I: movement to contact and contact in the vicinity of Snoul. Phase II: movement north of Snoul. Phase III is the withdrawal phase.

=== 1971 ===
In the end of 1970, Hiếu planned to lure the enemy with a regiment placed in Snuol in Cambodian territory, north of Lộc Ninh on National Route 13. The PAVN had 3 divisions (5th, 7th and 9th) operating in that area. III Corps was ready to commit all of its three Divisions (5th, 18th and 25th) in the event the North Vietnamese engaged one, two or all three divisions into the battlefield. General Trí the III Corps Commander died in a helicopter accident at the end of February 1971. General Minh, who replaced Trí, did not want to follow through with the luring plan, when 8th Task Force was succeeding in attracting the PAVN who gathered two divisions (5th and 7th) around Snuol. The beleaguered troops of 8th Task Force, when neither rescue column nor B-52 bombers were in sight, were about to raise the white flag to surrender to the PAVN. However, Hiếu executed his withdrawal plan in time to bring his troops back to Lộc Ninh. The troops' withdrawal was executed in three phases:

1. on 29 May 1971, 1/8th Battalion pierced through enemy blocking line at the northern outpost to rejoin the 8th Task Force Command Post located at Snuol market;
2. on 30 May 1971, 8th Task Force using 1/8th Battalion as the spear-head to pierce enemy blocking line, followed behind by 2/8th Battalion, Task Force Command Post, 1st Armored Squadron with 2/7th Battalion acting as rear cover, to withdraw from Snuol to the location defended by 3/8th Battalion, 3 kilometers Southeast of Snuol on National Route 13;
3. on 31 May 1971, 3/8th Battalion replaced 1/8th Battalion as the spearhead in piercing enemy blocking line, followed by 3/9th Battalion, 2/7th Battalion, Task Force Command Post, 1st Armored Squadron with 1/8th Battalion acting as rear cover, allowing 8th Task Force to reach the border on a 3 kilometer stretch and to return to Lộc Ninh.

Regarded by US advisers as the worst ARVN Division commander, Hiếu's forces had been badly handled during the Snuol operation, and his troops, according to II Field Force, Vietnam commander Michael S. Davison, were close to mutiny. Pushed by both Abrams and Minh to relieve him, Thiệu finally acceded and in April 1971 brought Col. Lê Văn Hưng up from Phong Dinh Province to take over the battered Division. Unfortunately, Hưng was the one ARVN officer whose candidacy American advisers had specifically recommended against. To the despair of US advisers Hiếu was promoted to deputy commander of I Corps.

=== 1972 ===
Following their incompetent handling of the First Battle of Quảng Trị, both Hiếu and the I Corps commander Hoàng Xuân Lãm were relieved. Lãm was replaced by Lieutenant general Ngô Quang Trưởng, who succeeded in halting the PAVN advance at the Mỹ Chánh Line. Hiếu was replaced by Lieutenant general Lâm Quang Thi.

=== 1974 ===
In 1974, as Deputy Commander of Operations/III Corps, assistant to General Phạm Quốc Thuần, Hiếu applied Blitzkrieg (lightning war) tactics to alleviate the pressure exerted by the PAVN 5th Division originating from Svay Rieng Province in the Parrot's Beak area of Cambodian territory aiming at Đức Huệ base camp. Hiếu employed twenty mobile battalions to surround the Parrot's Beak area. Secondly, on April 27, he launched 49th Infantry Regiment and 7th Ranger Group through the swamp lands around Đức Huệ towards the Cambodian border, and had Republic of Vietnam Air Force airplanes attack positions of PAVN 5th Division units. In the meantime, he relied on two Regional Force battalions belonging to IV Corps to move from Mộc Hóa up north to establish blocking positions on the southwestern edge of the PAVN 5th Division's logistical base and assembly area. On 28 April, Hiếu launched eleven battalions into the battleground to conduct preliminary operation in preparation of the main offensive.

The next morning, three armored squadrons of the III Corps Assault Task Force rushed across the Cambodian border from Gò Dầu Hạ, aiming directly at PAVN 5th Division HQ. Meanwhile, a task force composing of infantry and armor of IV Corps, originating from Mộc Hóa, maneuvered across the Cambodian border into the Elephant's Foot area to threaten the retreat of the PAVN 275th Regiment. The three armored squadrons continued their three-pronged advance 16 kilometers deep into the Cambodia before they veered south toward Hậu Nghĩa, and helicopters dropped troops unexpectedly on PAVN positions, while other ARVN units conducted rapid operations into the region between Đức Huệ and Gò Dầu Hạ. On 10 May, when the last ARVN units returned to their base camp, enemy communications and supplies networks were seriously disrupted. The PAVN suffered 1,200 killed, 65 prisoners, and tons of weapons captured; while, due to speed, secrecy and coordination factors of a multi-faced operation, the ARVN suffered less than 100 casualties.

== Anticorruption czar ==
Vice President Trần Văn Hương appointed Hiếu anticorruption czar on 10 February 1972. He occupied this position until October 1973. At that time corruption was rampant among the ARVN leadership, in the army, the administration, the police, the power authority, Air Vietnam, customs, etc. Hiếu chose to attack first the Military Pension Fund. After a five-month investigation, he presented his findings in detail on the national television on 14 July 1972.

As a result, the Defense Minister, General Nguyễn Văn Vy and seven colonels were ousted and the Military Pension Fund disbanded. Hiếu was not allowed to move on to other corruption targets. Thiệu limited Hiếu's investigative authority and prior presidential approval was necessary to commence an investigation at the level of chief of province. These limitations disappointed Hiếu who sought to return to the military and declared, "Either we correct our faults or the Communists will correct them for us."

== Evaluation ==
I Corps American Advisors' evaluation report in May 1968:

He is a man who possesses potential for highest rank in the Vietnamese Army. He should be sent to a CONUS school as soon as possible, preferably Ft. Leavenworth. He should be assigned to field command jobs to give him more command experience. This officer, properly handled and developed, could well become a future competent if not eminent general officer in the Vietnamese Army. His attitude toward the United States is strong, and his language fluency would be an invaluable asset to Allied operations.

Colonel John Hayes, ARVN 5th Infantry Division Senior Advisor's evaluation on 7 February 1970:

MG Nguyen Van Hieu, DOR 1-11-67, 20 years service. General Hieu is an above average commander. Good qualities include dedication, experience as a combat leader, ability to stimulate and maintain morale, and ability to control those in his command. He is quite religious and patriotic, and demands high standards of conduct and discipline. He is methodical but decisive. He is rated better than the average US Division commander in overall performance.

General Trần Văn Đôn's assessment:

In February 1972, Don, who was a LTG and is currently a Deputy Prime Minister, stated to the Consul in Da Nang that Hieu was one of the most capable generals in ARVN and "the most honest general in the Army today". The latter assessment is broadly held and frequently voiced by ARVN officers. Don further stated that he would take Hieu over virtually any ARVN general he knew.

== Unanswered questions concerning his death ==
On 8 April 1975, news came out of III Corps headquarters in Biên Hòa that Hiếu was found dead in his office. The next day, after attending the military press conference, UPI correspondent sent out the following dispatch: SAIGON (UPI) - The deputy commander of South Vietnamese troops defending the Saigon area was found shot to death Tuesday night following an argument with his superior over tactics. Military sources said he apparently committed suicide. The sources said Maj. Gen. Hiếu was found with a bullet wound in his mouth at his III Corps office at the edge of Biên Hòa airbase, 14 miles (23 km) northeast of Saigon. It was not known whether Hiếu's death was connected with the Tuesday morning bombing of the Presidential palace of Nguyễn Văn Thiệu.
