= 5th Division (South Vietnam) =

5th Division (1960-1975) 3rd Field Division (1955-1960)
- Sư đoàn 5
- 5th Division SSI
- Active: 9 March 1955–30 April 1975
- Country: South Vietnam
- Branch: Army of the Republic of Vietnam
- Role: Infantry
- Part of: III Corps
- Garrison/HQ: Biên Hòa
- Engagements: Vietnam War: 1960 South Vietnamese coup attempt; 1963 South Vietnamese coup; Battle of Đồng Xoài; Operation Birmingham; Operation El Paso; Operation Cedar Falls; Tet Offensive; Operation Quyet Thang; Operation Toan Thang I; Battle of Snuol; Easter Offensive; Battle of Loc Ninh; Battle of An Lộc; Battle of the Iron Triangle; Battle of Phước Long

Commanders
- Notable commanders: Nguyễn Đức Thắng; Nguyễn Văn Thiệu; Phạm Quốc Thuần; Nguyễn Văn Hiếu; Lê Văn Hưng; Tran Quoc Lich; Lê Nguyên Vỹ; Trần Quang Khôi

The Fifth Division of the Army of the Republic of Vietnam (ARVN)—the army of the government of South Vietnam that existed from 1955 to 1975—was part of the III Corps that oversaw the region of the country surrounding the capital, Saigon.

The Fifth Division was based in Biên Hòa, a town on the northern outskirts of Saigon, and due to the Division's close proximity to Saigon was a key factor in the success or failure of the various coup attempts in the nation's history. As a result, the loyalty of the commanding officer of the Division was crucial in maintaining power.

== History ==
=== 1960-1964 ===
The division was originally established as the 3rd Field Division and redesignated as the 5th Infantry Division in 1960.

In the 1960 South Vietnamese coup attempt, the loyalist Colonel Nguyễn Văn Thiệu used the division to storm into Saigon to save President Ngô Đình Diệm.

However, in the successful coup attempt of 1963, Thiệu rebelled and the division along with the rest of the III Corps of Tôn Thất Đính, attacked Saigon. Thiệu himself led the successful siege on Gia Long Palace. As a result, the leading generals made Thiệu a general.

On 31 December 1963, while Thiệu was out of the country, the division probed the VC's Boi Loi and Long Nguyen bases in Tay Ninh and Binh Duong provinces. Ten battalions participated and a mechanized troop, a company of tanks, a river assault group, three platoons of artillery, and aircraft backed them. At noon, a VC company lured the 32nd Ranger Battalion north across the Thi Tinh River where heavy fire from an entrenched battalion pinned it down. Unable to maneuver, the battalion directed strikes by 155mm howitzers and US Army helicopter gunships without apparent success. At 17:30, the Rangers launched an assault, but intense fire from their front and a new VC unit on their western flank stopped them. At 18:00, the Rangers withdrew to the southeast, but a VC battalion appeared to block their way. After repulsing two attacks from this new threat, the Rangers, now surrounded on three sides, escaped into dense jungle to the east. Fortunately, they had no further contacts, and by the time reinforcements finally arrived at noon on 1 January 1964, the VC were gone. The sweep continued until the fourth. The ARVN lost nine killed, 45 wounded, 31 missing, and 32 weapons lost mostly from the 32nd Rangers.

In January 1964, III Corps' senior adviser, Colonel Wilbur Wilson recommended that the junta remove Thiệu from command of the 5th Division. In Wilson's opinion, Thiệu focused too much on politics to the detriment of his duties. The junta did nothing, but junta leader General Nguyễn Khánh sent Thieu to the Joint General Staff (JGS) not as a punishment, but as a reward for his support. On 1 February, Khánh named a new division commander, Colonel (soon to be Brigadier general) Dang Thanh Liem.

Wilson found Liem to be "pro-American," which was the only good thing he could say about him. Otherwise, Wilson considered Liem: "stupid... immature and at times outright childish. He is indecisive and lacking in leadership. He is against fighting the Viet Cong with small units or with forces in equal strength to the Viet Cong; he requires an uneven ratio in his favor. On operations he holds foremost in his mind the fear of taking casualties. He is limited in his tactical knowledge which has led many of the division officers to question his military competence... His prosecution of the counterinsurgency effort can be characterized as less than energetic."

Wilson began lobbying for Liem's removal almost immediately. When COMUSMACV General Paul D. Harkins went out to counsel Liem in March, Lien reportedly told him "that he did not want any further advice; that he had been fighting the war for eighteen years and knew what had to be done." Harkins replaced the division adviser in the hope of promoting better relations, but the new man was no more successful in getting Liem to take advice. Subsequent efforts by MACV to either influence Liem or remove him had little effect.

At 01:00 on 6 February, the VC overran an outpost and three hamlets at Ap Ben Cau, 19km south of Tây Ninh, killing 65 of the 188 Self-Defense Force and militia defenders and capturing 50 weapons. The VC then fortified the hamlets waiting for a government relief force. The Americans urged a vigorous response, but the division's deputy commander was reluctant to act in Liem's absence. After much cajoling, he sent 300 men from the 2nd Battalion, 9th Infantry, an understrength Civil Guard company, and two 105mm howitzers. Leading the force was the regiment's executive officer, Captain Thai. Accompanying him were three advisers led by Captain Donald S. Cunningham. Upon approaching the hamlet of Ben Cau, Cunningham decided the VC had left and urged Thai to pursue. When Thai refused, he shamed him into advancing by threatening to scout the hamlet by himself. The battalion took up a position west of the walled hamlet when VC machine guns opened fire. Thai had allowed the Civil Guard company to advance on the town by itself from the south. Not until the company was 30 meters inside did the VC open fire, killing the commander and five other soldiers. As the troops retreated out the gate, Cunningham spotted them and, thinking they were VC, called down six artillery rounds that killed seven more of them. Cunningham suggested that Thai ask for air support, which first came in the form of two US helicopter gunships. After antiaircraft fire drove off the helicopters, Cunningham asked Thai to let him use a recoilless rifle to knock out a machine gun, only to learn that Thai had left the unit’s heavy weapons behind. By now, two AD–6 fighter-bombers were overhead. Thai kept them loitering for an hour before acquiescing to Cunningham’s demand that he employ them against the wall. After the bombs missed because of poor guidance from the ground, Cunningham defied Thai and crawled forward to a better viewing position from where he directed a successful rocket strike against the defenders. Thai however refused to advance, leaving the fighter-bombers to pummel Ben Cau, ignoring not only Cunningham's advice, but also three orders to attack radioed in from the battalion commander. Meanwhile, at division headquarters US advisers argued for the Vietnamese to send the entire 9th Infantry Regiment and an airborne battalion. Eventually the acting division commander agreed to send just one company of his own and to ask the JGS for the airborne battalion. The JGS consented to two companies. A shortage of helicopters in the area meant that the Americans could land only one unit at a time. At 16:00 12 US CH–21 helicopters landed the first of the two airborne companies north of town. The unit faltered under withering fire. Most of the paratroopers withdrew, but Airborne adviser Major Daniel L. Baldwin rallied ten men who stood their ground until their ammunition was exhausted. Already wounded twice himself, Baldwin then carried a seriously wounded paratrooper as they withdrew to safety. At 17:00, US Army helicopters delivered the 5th Division’s reconnaissance company, and at 17:50, they returned to land the second airborne company. Neither unit could make any headway. As darkness descended, the firing stopped, all except the howitzers that continued a desultory bombardment throughout the night. At 06:30 on 7 February, the 2nd Battalion entered Ben Cau. The VC had withdrawn 5km away to Cambodia overnight. The soldiers found a shattered community. A senior US adviser reported that the VC had dug 1,000 foxholes into the village berms, making anything but an assault by tanks impossible. Such an option was not available, as the division had sent all its tanks to Saigon a few days earlier to support Khánh's coup, and they had not yet returned. Later analysis determined that the VC had consisted not of a battalion of only 500 as first reported, but of the entire 1st Regiment with between 1,000 and 2,000 men. A JGS study based on captured documents concluded that the VC lost 61 dead and 105 wounded. South Vietnamese casualties amounted to 27 dead, 66 wounded, and 34 missing. The study reported 27 dead and 29 wounded civilians, likely an undercount. Aircraft and artillery had destroyed 670 houses, leaving up to 4,000 people homeless. The 5th Division gave Thai a battalion command.

On the night of 3–4 April 1964, the VC 1st Regiment returned from its Cambodian sanctuary and attacked Phuoc Tan New Life hamlet 2km from the border. The assault, which destroyed 186 houses, was mostly a pretext for setting a trap for the expected relief force. Captain Cunningham accompanied that force, which consisted of three division infantry companies, an ARVN Special Forces company, and a Civil Guard detachment. Cunningham was unable to persuade the ARVN to bring their 81mm mortars to a location from which they could fire in the coming battle. He likewise failed to dissuade the force commander from marching down a road into a predictable ambush. Once the firing began, however, his counterpart enthusiastically embraced his help in getting air and artillery support. The aid nearly resulted in disaster when the A-1s mistook the column for the enemy and dropped napalm just 100 meters from the command group. Surrounded on three sides by VC armed with recoilless rifles, mortars, and machine guns, the troops fell back as artillery mistakenly fired into a hamlet rather than at the VC positions. Four US Army helicopter gunships then arrived to hit the VC with rockets and machine guns. Later, Cunningham got the supporting 155mm howitzers to adjust their fire to be more effective. By nightfall, air and artillery fire had enabled the task force to extricate itself. A JGS study based on captured documents reported VC losses as 63 killed and 197 wounded. The South Vietnamese lost 25 dead, 22 wounded, and two missing. VC fire wounded six American advisers and aviators.

On 12 April Liem launched Operation Chinh Nghia 29, a six-battalion incursion into War Zone C. Liem only informed his senior advisor, Colonel McKnight, 11 hours before it began, a practice Vietnamese officers employed when they did not want US input. Battalions advanced in single file toward objectives that McKnight thought Liem had drawn to allow the VC to escape. Because of poor planning, two mechanized companies sat idle for 18 hours when government helicopters failed to bring them water. The vehicles advanced only after MACV made an emergency delivery using U.S. helicopters. Similarly, a battalion commander refused to move for six hours after a soldier became wounded and Vietnamese helicopters did not show up to evacuate the man. By the end of the operation, the division had suffered 11 casualties and the VC six. Wilson called the affair a "classic example of a grandiose 'safari' operation... which is contrary to the philosophy and direction of the Chien Thang plan, adversely affects province pacification, and flouts U.S. advice."

In his April monthly report, Wilson wrote: "The conclusions which may be drawn, are that large-scale military operations, as conducted by the 5th Division, produce negligible results, do not support pacification plans, and actually have set back the pacification time schedule in some provinces by as much as ninety days... If military forces were properly positioned and employed in the pacification effort, and if military forces would react more vigorously to VC attacks, accelerated progress could be expected in pacification of the corps tactical zone.” When Wilson and Westmoreland once again lobbied the corps commander and Khánh to replace Liem, they received pledges to do so, but no immediate action.

In June, after months of complaining by MACV, Khánh removed Liem, replacing him with Brigadier general Hao Cao Hon. McKnight soon praised Hon, for having an “outstanding grasp of the concept of pacification and a practical, logical approach to executing the pacification plan."

On 10 July the division and the 7th Division launched an operation to clear two VC battalions from the heavily forested border of Hau Nghia and Long An provinces. The division thrust southward from Duc Hoa along the Vàm Cỏ Đông River, while the 7th Division drove north from Bến Lức. The object was to trap and destroy the VC between them. Late in the day, the two VC battalions pinned the 30th Ranger Battalion against the banks of the Varic Oriental River. The Rangers received air support throughout the night and at 06:30 on 11 July, 24 US Army helicopters delivered an infantry battalion, but the VC already had withdrawn. ARVN losses were nine killed and 27 wounded, US losses were two killed and three wounded. The allies killed 68 VC and captured 73 suspects.

On 28 July 1964 the VC attacked several posts 10km north of Bến Cát, Binh Duong Province. The reaction force had moved just 1km north of Bến Cát when the VC opened fire, knocking out two tanks and injuring a third of the troops, and the ARVN hastily retired to the town. At 05:30 on the 30th, two VC battalions ambushed the 1st Battalion, 8th Infantry, as it moved from Bến Súc to Bến Cát. The soldiers broke and ran into flooded rice paddies, where they came under intense machine-gun fire. The unit was saved from annihilation by US air support. Over the three days the allies had lost 45 dead (including one US adviser), 59 wounded, 14 missing, and 52 weapons lost.

On 4 October 1964 over 1,000 VC ambushed two 8th Infantry battalions as they were moving between the hamlets Phu Hoa Dong and Ap Dong Nhut, Bình Dương province, killing 32 and one US adviser, with 53 wounded, 13 missing and 37 weapons lost. The allies found 13 VC dead and estimated that the VC had lost 80 dead and one hundred wounded, mostly from airstrikes.

On 11 October 1964 four VC battalions attacked two New Rural Life hamlets in Tay Ninh province, 48km northwest of Saigon. The VC penetrated Phouc Thanh, which a rifle company and the headquarters of the 1st Battalion, 9th Infantry, defended. The VC captured a 57mm recoilless rifle and then withdrew. Twenty minutes later, they returned. This time the defenders repulsed the attack with the assistance of nearby artillery. At Ap Chanh, the VC dispersed two infantry companies from the 1/9th Infantry. The ARVN reoccupied the hamlet after dawn. The 9th Infantry lost 30 dead, 34 wounded, 29 missing, a recoilless rifle, and 43 other weapons lost. The VC left 64 bodies, 12 prisoners, and 17 weapons, with the allies estimating that the ARVN had caused another 100 casualties. Three civilians died in the fighting and five suffered injuries. Three battalions set off in pursuit of the VC. During this operation, the VC exploded a mine under a jeep bearing the commander of the 1st Battalion, 43rd Infantry, and two US advisers, killing all three.

On 15 October 1964 the 2nd Battalion, 7th Infantry, accompanied by a Popular Forces platoon and a platoon of M24 tanks from the 1st Armored Cavalry Squadron was ambushed by a VC battalion 3km south of Ben Cat on Highway 13. The ARVN overran the original ambush and continued for 1km when they were ambushed again. Two M24s were destroyed by 57mm recoilless rifles and a third damaged before the vehicles could disengage. The VC then surged forward to surround the column. US Army UH–1B gunships and RVNAF A-1s arrived, and together with artillery fire helped the troops fall back to a position where a parallel column reinforced them. The combined force then counterattacked, with the engagement lasting until the VC broke contact at 11:30. The ARVN lost 16 dead, 21 wounded, and four missing. Reported VC losses ranged from 19 to 70 dead and between 40 and 100 casualties evacuated. One VC and 11 weapons were captured.

On 14 December 1964, about six VC used explosives to cut through barbed wire protecting the division headquarters at Thủ Dầu Một. The sound of the explosion went undetected as it occurred during a mortar bombardment. The infiltrators reached the officers’ quarters, where they used small arms, grenades, and explosives to wreak mayhem before withdrawing. They killed two civilians and wounded seven, including three US advisers.

On 15 December 1964 the 1st Battalion, 8th Infantry, backed by the division reconnaissance company and an engineer company, struck an underground complex 24km northwest of Saigon near Ap Nha Viec, Binh Duong province. For five days the troops searched the tunnels and then used explosives to seal their entrances. The operation resulted 21 VC killed and five captured. Defectors later said that about 100 VC died in the tunnels because of the demolition work. ARVN losses were one dead and three wounded.

=== 1965 ===
The division was largely composed of Nùng people until about 1965 when its composition was increasingly ethnic Vietnamese and the Nùngs moved into MIKE Force units.

On 8 May after intelligence indicated that a VC battalion and an arms depot was located about 10km northwest of Thủ Dầu Một, the division launched an air assault by two battalions of the 9th Infantry against the depot. A VC .50-caliber machine gun shot down a CH–34 carrying intelligence personnel and two defectors who were to lead the soldiers to the target killing all onboard. The 9th Infantry failed to find the weapons depot, but killed two VC, captured 75,000 South piastres, and destroyed up to 30 tons of rice before linking up with another battalion that had advanced by land. The three battalions set up a perimeter for the night near the Saigon River. The next morning, the three battalions set out in nine company columns, each spaced 50 meters apart in dense jungle. As they advanced, the troops received an increasing amount of fire and adopted a defensive position at midday. The division commander refused reinforcements, judging the situation too dangerous and instead air and artillery strikes were maintained around the perimeter. When the VC attacked, many of the ARVN fled in disorder, including the regimental commander, whom the government had decorated 13 times for bravery, joined the stampede. The rout left just 200 ARVN, many of whom were wounded, and 16 US advisers to face the VC. The remaining soldiers established a perimeter about 1km west of the original position. Bowing to US pressure, the division commander agreed to a rare nighttime airmobile assault, with US helicopters delivering a fresh battalion at 20:00. The defenders faced nothing more than harassing fire through the night. At 07:00 on the tenth, helicopters delivered an airborne battalion to reinforce the survivors and to facilitate their extraction later that day. The fiasco cost the ARVN 32 dead, 122 wounded, 36 missing, a helicopter, plus nearly 100 weapons. The US Army suffered two dead and three wounded. VC losses were four killed with three soldiers and four weapons captured.

On the morning of 10 June during the Battle of Đồng Xoài, the 1st Battalion, 7th Infantry Regiment was landed by helicopter near the Thuận Lợi rubber plantation, about 4km north of Đồng Xoài where they were ambushed by VC forces suffering heavy losses. The division's US adviser reported that the commander, General Phạm Quốc Thuần, had "gone to pieces" over the mauling his 7th Regiment had received and the unit was notorious for its high desertion rate.

On 8 July the VC attacked a small post 2km outside of Dầu Tiếng. The division hurriedly dispatched the 2nd Battalion, 9th Infantry, without a forward observer or air cover. At 12:10, two VC battalions ambushed the column as it neared the post, killing 103 soldiers (including four Americans) and wounding 26. Another 199 soldiers went missing, with all but 79 eventually returning to the colors. The VC captured a mortar, a machine gun, 13 Browning automatic rifles, and 101 individual weapons.

On 15 July two VC battalions attacked the bivouac of the 2nd Battalion, 7th Infantry, which was engaged in a road-clearing operation. The rest of the 7th Infantry was nearby but did not respond quickly to help. ARVN losses were 44 killed, 63 wounded and 17 missing, and 43 individual and six crew-served weapons lost. Two Americans were killed and four wounded. The VC also destroyed four M113s and damaged five more.

On the morning of 27 November, the 7th Regiment operating in the Michelin Rubber Plantation was overrun by the VC 271st and 273rd Regiments, killing most of the Regiment (possibly up to 500 soldiers) and its seven US advisers. Major general Seaman ordered Colonel William Brodbeck's 3rd Brigade, 1st Infantry Division to rescue the shattered 7th Regiment.

=== 1966-1967 ===
In 1966 US advisers regarded the division and the 25th Division as the two worst units in the ARVN. Both divisions guarded the approaches to Saigon, but the brunt of the fighting had been assumed by US combat units, the 1st and 25th Infantry Divisions and three separate brigades. Under their protection, the two divisions performed static security missions, but rather than using this respite to regroup and retrain their forces, or to hunt down the local VC, the Vietnamese commanders had let their units degenerate through inactivity, and US advisers now rated them lower than even the neighboring RF/PF. In early May General William Westmoreland ordered the US 1st and 25th Divisions to "start working more closely with elements of these two [South Vietnamese] divisions on operations in order to improve their morale, efficiency and effectiveness." He suggested a "buddy" effort, matching the US 1st and the Division and the US 25th and the ARVN 25th Divisions. In mid-May the new US 1st Division commander, General William E. DePuy had one of his three brigades supporting the division. Initially each unit contributed one infantry battalion to the project. Combined activities consisted of small unit patrolling, village seals and searches, propaganda campaigns, intelligence collection efforts, and various civic improvement projects. In July, however, with the bulk of his units engaged in heavy fighting north of Saigon, DePuy had to abandon the combined operations task force concept. Thereafter, DePuy monitored and supported the division's activities in Bình Dương Province through his 2nd Brigade headquarters, only occasionally assigning ground units to the effort.

From 24 April to 17 May 1966 the division participated in Operation Birmingham with the US 1st Infantry Division against the VC 9th Division in Tây Ninh Province.

From 19 May to 13 July 1966 the division participated in Operation El Paso with the US 3rd Brigade, 1st Infantry Division in Bình Long Province against the VC 9th Division.

From 8–26 January 1967 four battalions of the division participated in Operation Cedar Falls a large US search and destroy mission against the Iron Triangle, Bình Dương Province. The ARVN role was primarily as a blocking force and population screening and evacuation while the US forces undertook offensive operations, nevertheless the Division lost 11 killed while total VC losses were 720 killed and 218 captured.

On 11 July 1967, a month following the beginnings of CORDS pacification project near Tan Hung, Bình Long Province, the first major program of civilian pacification and effective counterinsurgency, the HQ and HQ Company and two other companies would earn a Presidential Unit Citation from Lyndon Johnson. As CORDS would in-effect undermine the continual insurgency war, the PAVN 141st Regiment had launched a full-scale attack against the division HQ in hopes of quashing the experiment. The successful defence of the HQ and base had not only secured the continual pacification of the hamlet, but would demonstrate the effectiveness of the CORDS project which would by 1970 secure 93% of all villages and effectively end the VC insurgency.

In 1967 MACV assessed that the three ARVN divisions surrounding Saigon, the division, 18th and the 25th Division had shown no improvement, and US advisers considered their commanders, Generals Pham Quoc Thuan, Đỗ Kế Giai (18th Division) and Phan Trọng Chinh (25th Division), flatly incompetent. The senior Junta generals had repeatedly agreed on the need to replace them, but, for political reasons, had taken no action. Although continually judged by American leaders as corrupt and incapable, Thuan had strong political ties with the Junta generals, in this case, Thiệu. John Paul Vann noted the "widespread public belief that Thuan not only controlled most of the local bars and prostitution houses but also extorted protection fees for convoys moving through his Division tactical area. DePuy, commanding the nearby US 1st Infantry Division, agreed. He made the convoy protection charge public, as did a local Vietnamese province chief, perhaps with Vann's encouragement. Westmoreland could do little. He already had taken up the matter previously with JGS chairman General Cao Văn Viên, but to no avail. Thuan had been Thieu's chief of staff when the latter had commanded the 5th Division back in 1962, and the division, together with General Dư Quốc Đống's airborne units, remained Thiệu's major basis of power. In the interests of political stability, nothing could be done.

=== 1968-1971 ===
During the Tet Offensive attacks on Bien Hoa and Long Binh from 31 January to 2 February 1968 the division and the 3rd Ranger Task Force, consisting of the 35th and 36th Ranger Battalions, successfully defended its headquarters and other key facilities in the Bien Hoa-Long Binh complex.

From 11 March to 7 April 1968 the division's 7th and 8th Regiments participated in Operation Quyet Thang in Bình Dương Province with the US 2nd and 3rd Brigades, 1st Infantry Division to reestablish South Vietnamese control over the areas immediately around Saigon in the aftermath of the Tet Offensive.

From 8 April to 31 May 1968 the division participated in Operation Toan Thang I to continue pressure on PAVN/VC forces in III Corps after the successful Operation Quyet Thang. The operation involved nearly every combat unit in III Corps. The operation was a success with allied forces claiming 7,645 VC/PAVN killed, however the operation did not prevent the PAVN/VC from launching their May Offensive attacks against Saigon.

In September 1968 MACV rated Thuần as inept and division advisers noted that the division had "withdrawn into a shell" and was doing nothing constructive." Minor incidents, like Thuần's daily pot shots at birds from the second story balcony of his home and the subsequent accidental wounding of his intelligence adviser, were not uncommon and at times trivialized and mocked the entire war effort. II Field Force, Vietnam commander Lieutenant general Walter T. Kerwin, Jr. appealed to COMUSMACV General Creighton Abrams for help, and the MACV commander reportedly "raised hell" with Thiệu over the matter, but Thiệu did nothing.

In June 1969 the new II Field Force, Vietnam commander Lieutenant general Julian Ewell initiated the Dong Tien (or "Progress Together") Program with III Corps commander, General Đỗ Cao Trí, to "buddy up US and ARVN units to conduct combined operations [that would]... maximize the effectiveness of both forces [and] achieve in 2, 3, or 4 months a quantum jump in ARVN and RF/PF performance." The most important Dong Tien operation was between the division and the US 1st Infantry Division. Both units stood astride Route 13, the major artery connecting the capital region with the Cambodian border and, conversely, a primary avenue to Saigon for PAVN/VC units infiltrating south. Since 1965 the American division had worked the area, driving the regular enemy units across the Cambodian border and slowly rooting out his larger local forces. During the same period the division, under Thuần, had generally performed what at best could be described as securing missions in central and southern Bình Dương Province. In 1968 South Vietnamese intelligence estimated that 17,000 PAVN/VC troops were active in the division's theoretical area of responsibility, but out of almost 2,000 combat operations supposedly conducted by one of the division's regiments that year, only 36 had led to engagements with enemy forces, and these resulted in only 17 PAVN/VC reportedly killed and five captured, at a cost of 14 soldiers killed and three weapons lost. Such poor track records reflected what Americans derisively called Saigon's "search and avoid" tactics, and were patently unacceptable to Ewell and Trí. Up to 1969, overriding political concerns had forced MACV to live with the marginal performance of the division. The close friendship between Thiệu and Thuần was well known, as was the political role of the division in stabilizing the old military regime. However, by mid-1969 the political as well as the military situation around the capital had changed, and the threat of a military coup was remote. At the same time, the projected redeployment of US forces from South Vietnam made it all the more necessary that Saigon bring units like the division back into the mainstream of the war effort as soon as possible. In August 1969 Thuần was finally replaced as Division commander by General Nguyễn Văn Hiếu, however US officials had major reservations about this replacement, not regarding Hiếu as a dynamic leader. The Dong Tien operation between the two units lasted from July 1969 until the departure of the 1st Infantry Division from South Vietnam in March 1970. During this period infantry battalions of the division's 7th Regiment worked extensively with those of the 1st Division's 2nd Brigade in central Bình Dương Province, while similar units of the division's 8th Regiment operated with battalions of the 1st Division's 1st and 3rd Brigades in the northern Bình Dương jungles. In each case, US and ARVN infantry battalions shared common fire support bases and patrolled a common operational area in the dense forests surrounding these strongpoints. The two battalion commanders planned and commanded the operations jointly, with the Americans providing the helicopter support for troop movements and resupply. With the extra push of working with American commanders, staffs, and troops, the lethargic Vietnamese battalions began to wake up. As in the earlier pair-off program, decentralized operations meant that small-unit leaders learned to make decisions on their own, while battalion commanders and staffs learned to control airmobile operations and troop actions over a wider area. Marginal officers were identified and often replaced, and, perhaps most important, ARVN morale began to climb. Drawbacks to the 1st Division's Dong Tien operation were primarily in the areas of scope and duration. Periodically the ARVN regimental commanders rotated participating infantry battalions, but only two were active in the program at anyone time, and neither the regimental nor the division headquarters became closely involved in the effort. Later, as the program progressed, Hiếu brought a few of his artillery batteries into the endeavor, and approved liaison and training between various 1st and 5th Division support units. But only two Vietnamese artillery batteries ever participated, the involvement of other division elements remained minimal, and the 9th Regiment took no part in the effort. Almost all helicopter and most artillery support were American. Another significant factor, one that was both helpful and seductive, was the inactivity of PAVN/VC military forces, and thus, as in the other Dong Tien operations, there was no real test of South Vietnamese effectiveness in heavy fighting. However, when the program terminated in March 1970, it had pried the 5th Division out of its safe havens in southern Bình Dương and oriented its soldiers away from the political and economic concerns of the Saigon metropolitan area. As the 1st Infantry Division began its redeployment in early 1970, Hiếu moved his division headquarters north and, with the help of adjacent American units, gradually took over responsibility for the 1st Division's former operational area without incident.

On 30 April 1970 as part of Operation Toan Thang 42 (Total Victory), an early phase of the Cambodian Campaign, a division infantry regiment and the 1st Armored Cavalry Squadron together with other ARVN forces crossed into the Parrot's Beak region of Svay Rieng Province.

In mid-1970 MACV rated Hiếu as "unsatisfactory" and recommended his relief. Regarded by US advisers as the worst ARVN Division commander, Hieu's forces had been badly handled during the Battle of Snuol, and his troops, according to II Field Force commander Michael S. Davison, were close to mutiny. Pushed by both Abrams and Minh to relieve him, Thiệu finally acceded and in April 1971 brought Colonel Lê Văn Hưng up from Phong Dinh Province to take over the battered Division. Unfortunately, Hưng was the one ARVN officer whose candidacy American advisers had specifically recommended against.

=== Easter Offensive ===
On 2 April 1972 at the start of the Easter Offensive, the VC 24th Independent Regiment overran Fire Support Base Lac Long, defended by elements of the 49th Regiment, about 35 kilometres (22 mi) northwest of Tây Ninh. The attacks on Lac Long and other outposts in Tây Ninh were a diversion designed to cover the main thrust into Bình Long Province. To initiate the campaign in Bình Long, the VC 5th Division (numbering about 9,230 soldiers) was ordered to take Lộc Ninh, Bình Long's northernmost town. The VC were supported by the PAVN 69th Artillery Command (3,830 soldiers) and the 203rd Armored Regiment (800 soldiers). Defending Lộc Ninh was the 9th Infantry Regiment commanded by Colonel Nguyễn Công Vinh, supported by the 1st Cavalry Squadron, 1st Regional Force Battalion and elements of the 74th Ranger Battalion. The attack began around 06:50 on 5 April with a heavy barrage of artillery, rocket and mortar fire targeting the headquarters of the 9th Regiment and the Lộc Ninh district compound. The VC simultaneously mounted other attacks throughout the division's areas of operations in Lai Khê and Quản Lợi. The ARVN held back the initial ground assault and massive airpower was directed against the VC. Colonel Vinh ordered the 1st Cavalry Squadron — commanded by Lieutenant colonel Nguyen Huu Duong — to withdraw from Fire Support Base Alpha to reinforce Lộc Ninh. However, Duong refused, saying he would surrender his unit to the VC instead. Angered, Captain Mark A. Smith reportedly threatened to destroy the 1st Cavalry Squadron with American air power if the squadron didn't fight. From that point on, Smith virtually controlled the ARVN forces. A few moments later, elements of the ARVN 74th Ranger Battalion and the 3rd Battalion, 9th Infantry Regiment notified the regimental command post that they had broken out and were fighting their way back towards Lộc Ninh. Meanwhile, the 1st Cavalry Squadron began moving west towards the Cambodian border to engage the VC. A second ground assault in the afternoon was repelled by airstrikes, however Vinh was either planning to surrender or desert when he ordered two of his soldiers to open the gates of the command compound at around 22:00. On the morning of 6 April a renewed VC assault entered the base and at this point the 9th Regiment only had 50 soldiers left, while another 150 wounded were in the hospital bunker.

In an attempt to save Lộc Ninh, Brigadier general Hưng ordered Task Force 52 to move north to reinforce the beleaguered 9th Regiment. Task Force 52 consisted of the 2nd Battalion, 52nd Infantry Regiment and the 1st Battalion, 48th Infantry Regiment; both transferred from the 18th Division in late March to serve as a border screen for Hưng's forces. As the 2nd Battalion to advance towards Lộc Ninh it was ambushed at the junction of Highway 13 and Route 17. Unable to withstand the VC's superior firepower, it was forced to withdraw. To prevent Task Force 52 from evacuating to either Lộc Ninh or An Lộc, the VC pursued Task Force 52 and bombarded their bases with heavy artillery throughout the day.

On the afternoon of 6 April, the 3rd Battalion, 9th Regiment, along with the men of the 1st Cavalry Squadron at FSB Alpha who had refused to surrender arrived at Lộc Ninh to join the defense. During the night PAVN artillery scored a direct hit on the hospital bunker, killing a large number of wounded men. Later on, another round of rockets struck the artillery compound, striking the ammunition storage bunker, which exploded. From the eastern side of the district, the VC tried to penetrate the defense line at Lộc Ninh, but were beaten off. Realizing that the situation had become hopeless, Vinh took off his uniform and told his troops to surrender. At 07:00 on 7 April, the VC massed for another ground assault from the north and west of Lộc Ninh, with support from heavy artillery, tanks and armored personnel carriers. As the VC closed in, Vinh and his bodyguards ran out the opened gate and surrendered. Several ARVN soldiers also tried to surrender, but they all returned to their positions after Smith stopped an ARVN officer from raising a white T-shirt up the flagpole. By 08:00 the 9th Regiment was completely overwhelmed when the VC overran the southern compound with their superior numbers. At around 10:00, all tactical air support was called off in order to clear the way for B-52 strikes against VC formations west of Lộc Ninh. However, the B-52 strikes could not prevent the VC from overrunning Lộc Ninh. By 16:30, the VC were in complete control of Lộc Ninh District.

Lộc Ninh became the seat of the Provisional Revolutionary Government, the capital of "liberated" territories in South Vietnam. PAVN/VC losses are estimated to exceed 1,000 killed. The ARVN lost more than 3,000 soldiers killed or captured; only about 50 soldiers actually reached An Lộc. The VC also captured all seven American advisers.

As Lộc Ninh was succumbing, other PAVN/VC formations turned their attention to the provincial capital of An Lộc. At 09:00 on 7 April, Hưng ordered Task Force 52 to abandon its bases, destroy all heavy weapons and vehicles, and withdraw to An Lộc, following their failed attempt at reinforcing Lộc Ninh. As Task Force 52 tried to break through National Highway 13, they ran into another large VC ambush. It would take the soldiers of Task Force 52 about a week to reach An Lộc, infiltrating through PAVN/VC positions along the main road. Late on 7 April, the VC 9th Division attacked Quản Lợi Base Camp, just 3 kilometres (1.9 mi) north of An Lộc. Elements of the 7th Regiment defending the area were unable to hold off the VC, so they were ordered to destroy their equipment and join other ARVN units in the provincial capital. The next step in the offensive was the Battle of An Lộc.

At the start of the Battle of An Lộc the town was defended by the Division's 8th Regiment with about 2,100 men; the 7th Regiment (less one battalion) with 850 men; the 9th Regiment, most of which was destroyed at Lộc Ninh and had only had 200 men; Task Force 52, 500 men; the 3rd Ranger Group, 1,300 men; as well as Binh Long Provincial Regional Forces, Popular Forces and People's Self-Defense Forces (PSDF), about 2,000 men. The initial attack on the town was repulsed by airpower and skillful use of M72 LAW rockets against PAVN tanks. The second assault on 15 April was also repulsed and the defenders were reinforced by the arrival of the 1st Airborne Brigade. The PAVN bombarded the town and gradually reduced the defensive line, while all the time being battered by US and South Vietnamese air strikes. On 11 May the PAVN 5th and 9th Divisions launched a massive all-out infantry and armor assault on An Lộc, suffering severe losses to air strikes but further squeezing the defenders. Another assault on 12 May failed to take the city. The PAVN launched a final attack on 19 May in honor of Ho Chi Minh's birthday. The attack was broken up by U.S. air support and an ambush by the Airborne. After the attacks of 11 and 12 May the PAVN directed its main efforts to cutting off any more relief columns. However, by 9 June this proved ineffective, and the defenders were able to receive the injection of manpower and supplies needed to sweep the surrounding area of PAVN and by 18 June the battle was over. The 18th Division was moved in to replace the exhausted Division and the 18th Division would spread out from An Lộc and push the PAVN back, increasing security in the area.

Following the heavy fighting, Thiệu replaced almost all of the division commanders in the zone with Hưng being replaced Colonel Tran Quoc Lich.

=== 1973-4 ===
By early 1973 the Division headquarters was at Lai Khê in Bình Dương Province, with one regiment usually based at Phú Giáo District. The PAVN 205th Regiment, which had been operating under the control of the 7th Division, was opposing the Division in eastern Bình Dương. Concern for the security of Phuoc Long had prompted the stationing of the 9th Regiment at Phước Bình District. At the same time, the PAVN 7th Division was operating from a base east of Highway 13 between Chơn Thành Camp and Bàu Bàng District.

In November 1973 Thiệu dismissed Lich for corruption and Colonel Lê Nguyên Vỹ assumed command of the division.

In the last half of 1973 in southern Bình Long and western Bình Dương Provinces very little combat took place. The PAVN continued its buildup in the Minh Thanh Plantation and the Lai Khê-Bến Cát area, shifted its artillery southward into the Long Nguyen area from where it increased the weight and frequency of attacks against the ARVN bases. The only ground engagement of note took place in early January 1974 just west of Chơn Thành when the 2nd Battalion, 8th Regiment was struck hard by the PAVN 7th Battalion, 209th Infantry, 7th Division. Charged with blocking Highway 13 and preventing any ARVN advance toward Minh Thanh, the 7th Battalion killed 36 ARVN soldiers in this engagement, wounded 26 others and captured 85 weapons.

On 2 July 1974 the division relieved the 18th Division which had been fighting the PAVN 7th and 9th Divisions in the Battle of the Iron Triangle. In early September the division renewed the effort to recapture Base 82, with the 8th Infantry Regiment nearly succeeding until being routed by a PAVN armored counterattack with casualties of six killed, 29 missing and 67 wounded. The 8th Regiment was relieved by the 9th Regiment which on 19 September began methodically eliminating the PAVN defensive positions, eventually recapturing the base on 4 October. In mid-November the 9th Regiment took part in the recapture of Rach Bap, ending the Iron Triangle campaign.

From 12 December 1974 to 6 January 1975 three battalions of the division together with Regional Forces and Rangers fought the Battle of Phước Long.

=== 1975 ===
On 12 March the 3rd Battalion, 7th Regiment was attached to the 25th Division and sent to reinforce Khiem Hanh. On 23 March, ARVN forces made contact with the PAVN near Truong Mit, northwest of Khiem Hanh. A major battle developed on the 24th and casualties were very heavy on both sides. The 3rd Battalion, 7th Regiment lost over 400 men killed, wounded, and missing, and the attacking PAVN 271st Regiment, 9th Division, left nearly 200 dead. The decimated battalion was withdrawn from combat and sent to the regimental base at Phu Giao in Binh Duong Province.

Division commander Colonel Lê Nguyên Vỹ committed suicide upon the surrender of his division to the PAVN on 30 April 1975.

== Organisation ==
Component units:

- 7th Infantry Regiment
- 8th Infantry Regiment
- 9th Infantry Regiment
- 50th, 51st, 52nd and 53rd Artillery Battalions
- 1st Armored Cavalry Squadron
- US Advisory Team 70
