= Operation Atlas Wedge =

Part of the Vietnam War (1969)

- Part of the Vietnam War
Date	17 – 24 March 1969
Location	Michelin Rubber Plantation, Bình Dương Province, South Vietnam
Result	U.S. victory

Belligerents
United States; South Vietnam	North Vietnam

Commanders and leaders
George Patton IV; Lee D. Duke; John W. McEnery	

Units involved
(United States) 1st and 3rd Squadrons 11th Armored Cavalry Regiment; 2nd Battalion, 28th Infantry Regiment (South Vietnam) Minh Thanh CIDG Company	7th Division

Casualties and losses
(United States) 7 killed	US body count: 335 killed 11 captured

Operation Atlas Wedge was a joint U.S. Army and Army of the Republic of Vietnam (ARVN) military operation from 17 to 24 March 1969 during the Vietnam War designed to engage People's Army of Vietnam (PAVN) units in the Michelin Rubber Plantation, Bình Dương Province.

== Background ==
The 11th Armored Cavalry Regiment (11th ACR) received a warning order for its participation in the operation on 15 March. Following a II Field Force, Vietnam planning conference on 16 March the 11th ACR received its final orders. A visual reconnaissance of the area of operations was planned for 17 March.

== Operation ==
On the afternoon of 17 March four LOHs and one UH-1 command and control helicopter began the initial reconnaissance of the 11th ACR's area of operation. Upon arriving over the northeast Michelin Plantation it soon became evident that the area was being occupied by a large PAVN force. Large groups of PAVN troops were seen in the rubber trees and clearance to fire was requested. While waiting for clearance the PAVN made little or no attempt to hide from the helicopters. After a 90-minute wait the Air Cavalry Troop was given clearance to engage the PAVN and throughout the day tactical air strikes were directed against the PAVN. Two AH-1 Cobras remained on station throughout the day and made repeated strikes against the PAVN. One LOH was damaged by ground fire and landed at Lai Khê for repairs. 30 dead PAVN were counted from the air. As a result of these engagements the area of operations was moved into the Michelin Plantation and the 1st and 3rd Squadrons 11th ACR were committed to the operation.

On 18 March Company A, 2nd Battalion, 28th Infantry Regiment was landed to clear three chokepoints leading from Route 13 west into the plantation. At 16:00 Troops B, C and D, 1st Squadron engaged and killed 23 PAVN. At 17:30 M Troop, 3rd Squadron killed 14 PAVN and captured five. Total PAVN losses for the day were 119 killed and five captured.

On 19 March the 1st and 3rd Squadrons moved toward the northwest of the plantation. At 18:10 B Troop killed 20 PAVN and captured one. M Troop and the Minh Thanh CIDG Company killed 15 PAVN and captured one. Total PAVN losses were 49 killed and three captured.

On 20 March three B-52 strikes took place in the northeast of the plantation in the early morning. The air cavalry team performed a bomb damage assessment and the aero-rifle platoon and Minh Thanh CIDG Company were landed in the area. At 11:32 the units were engaged by the PAVN and three platoons reinforced the contact resulting in 75 PAVN killed of the total of 89 PAVN killed during the day.

On 21 March the 1st Squadron moved to the northern part of the plantation while the 3rd Squadron and the Minh Thanh CIDG Company left the operation. Four PAVN were killed during the day.

On 22 March the 1st Squadron continued bomb damage assessment and the air cavalry troop made contact with PAVN carrying litters. C Troop and a platoon from D Company were sent to the area and killed 11 PAVN. A total of 34 PAVN were killed during the day and three captured.

On 23 March the air cavalry troop unsuccessfully tried to acquire targets between the Michelin Plantation and Minh Thanh. The operation was terminated on 24 March.

== Aftermath ==
PAVN losses were 335 killed and 11 captured and a further 58 possibly killed, 77 individual and 11 crew-served weapons were captured. U.S. losses were seven killed.

The PAVN claim that they had killed over 2,000 enemy, mostly Americans, destroyed more than 210 military vehicles and shot down 12 aircraft during the operation.
