= 7th Infantry Division (Vietnam) =

- Active: 1966-present
- Allegiance: Vietnam
- Branch: People's Army of Vietnam
- Type: Infantry
- Size: Division
- Part of: 7th Military Region
- Garrison/HQ: Bình Dương Province, Vietnam
- Nickname: Sư đoàn Bến Tre (Bến Tre Division)
- Engagements: Battle of Snuol; 1975 Spring Offensive; Battle of Phuoc Long; Battle of Xuân Lộc

The 7th Infantry Division is a division of the People's Army of Vietnam (PAVN).

== Vietnam War ==
The Division was formed on 13 June 1966 in the Mekong Delta region from the 52nd, 141st and 165th Regiments.

Shortly after midnight on 7 August 1967 the Division's 165th Regiment attacked Tonle Cham Camp. Gunships guided by illuminating shells stopped the first wave of sappers, but a second assault penetrated the southern perimeter. Many of the defenders in that sector surrendered, only to be executed by their captors. A similar fate might have befallen the others had the camp's ammunition bunker not detonated. The explosion caused heavy casualties on both sides and forced most of the PAVN to flee. Although the PAVN assaulted the camp twice more that night, they had lost their momentum, and the defenders held. In the end the garrison lost 26 men killed and 87 wounded. A search of the area around the camp turned up 152 PAVN dead and 60 weapons.

On 24 November 1967 while the United States Army was conducting Operation Shenandoah II the Division attempted to close Highway 13 sending the 2nd Battalion, 165th Regiment to attack a U.S. night defensive position on the shoulder of Highway 13 12 km south of An Lộc. The attack was repulsed with the PAVN leaving 57 dead, U.S. losses were four dead. On 3 December the 1st Battalion, 141st Regiment attacked another U.S. night defensive position 3 km to the south. This time the PAVN succeeding in penetrating the perimeter before again being forced back by defensive fire, air and artillery strikes. PAVN losses were 27 killed, while U.S. losses were seven killed. On 10 December the Division attacked Firebase Caisson VI 6 km south of An Lộc losing 143 killed while killing only one U.S.

From 12 May to 6 June 1968 the Division's 141st and 165th Regiments fought 1st Australian Task Force units in the Battle of Coral–Balmoral losing 267 killed and 11 captured for Australian losses of 25 killed.

In mid-March 1969 the Division was operating in the Michelin Rubber Plantation where it came under attack from the 11th Armored Cavalry Regiment in Operation Atlas Wedge losing 335 killed for U.S. losses of seven killed.

In March 1970 the 209th Regiment engaged the U.S. 2nd Squadron, 11th Armored Cavalry Regiment near Lộc Ninh, U.S. units claimed a body count of over 200 killed.

By 1971 the Division was operating in Cambodia and PAVN command formed the Corps-sized Group 301 comprising the Division and the 5th and 9th Divisions, the 28th Artillery Regiment and the 12th Anti-aircraft Machine Gun Battalion.

During the Battle of An Lộc, on 12 April 1972 a relief force of the Army of the Republic of Vietnam (ARVN) 32nd Regiment, 21st Division departed Lai Khê to reopen Route 13 to Chơn Thành Camp 30 km south of An Lộc. After making slow progress, on 22 April the 32nd Regiment encountered a roadblock of the PAVN 101st Regiment 15 km north of Lai Khê. From 24 April the 21st Division engaged the PAVN in a two-pronged attack to clear the road with the 32nd Regiment attacking from the north and the 33rd Regiment attacking from the south. These attacks eventually forced the 101st Regiment to withdraw west on 27 April leaving one battalion to cover the withdrawal for a further 2 days. The 31st Regiment was then lifted by helicopters 6 km north of Chơn Thành where it fought the Division's 165th Regiment, later reinforced by the 209th Regiment, for the next 13 days. Eventually on 13 May with intensive air support the 31st Regiment overran the PAVN positions and extended ARVN control to 8 km north of Chơn Thành. The 32nd Regiment then deployed into the Tau O area a further 5 km north where they ran into the 209th Regiment's well-prepared blocking positions which stopped the 21st Division's advance for 38 days despite extensive artillery and air support including B-52 strikes. This stalemate would continue until the PAVN withdrew from An Lộc. On 15 May 1972 an ARVN task force of the 15th Regiment, 9th Division which was redeployed from the Mekong Delta and the 9th Armored Cavalry Squadron moved north east of Route 13 bypassing the 209th Regiment's roadblock at Tau O to establish a fire support base at Tan Khai 10 km south of An Lộc. On 20 May the 141st Regiment attacked the base at Tan Khai and continued attacking unsuccessfully for 3 days against a determined defense before withdrawing.

From June to November 1974 the Division's 141st Regiment fought the ARVN in the Battle of the Iron Triangle.

On 20 July 1974, the High Command of the PAVN created the 4th Army Corps with Major General Hoang Cam appointed as its first commander. The 4th Army Corps comprised the 3rd and 7th Infantry Divisions, the 429th Special Forces Regiment, the 25th Engineers Regiment, the 210th and 235th Logistical Groups and the Viet Cong 9th Division.

On 12 December 1974 the 4th Corps launched their assault on Phước Long. On 13 December the 7th and 3rd Divisions attacked ARVN positions at Bố Đức and Duc Phong overrunning them the next day. On 26 December Regiment 141 attacked the ARVN base at Đôn Luân overrunning it within 5 hours. On 31 December the 4th Corps had surrounded Phước Long and began their assault on the city and by the evening of 5 January 1975 Phước Long had fallen. The battle was a turning point in the war because it showed that the United States was no longer prepared to intervene militarily to save South Vietnam and that the ARVN was overstretched with limited ability to respond forcefully to PAVN offensive action.

For the 1975 Spring Offensive, in March the 4th Corps attacked ARVN installations in Tây Ninh Province and Bình Dương Province. On 11 March the 4th Corps attacked Dầu Tiếng taking it within 2 days they then proceeded to attack other ARVN units and by 2 April controlled all of Bình Long Province. The 4th Corps then began to approach Xuân Lộc part of the last defensive line before Saigon from the northeast. Two regiments from the 7th supported the main assault by the 341st Division. The ARVN 18th Division withstood the initial attacks and on 12 April were reinforced by men of the elite 1st Airborne Brigade and Vietnamese Marines. By 16 April the battle was turning in favour of the PAVN and on 19 April the ARVN General Staff ordered the units defending Xuân Lộc to withdraw to defend Biên Hòa. The 4th Corps pushed on towards Biên Hòa and at 5pm on 26 April they attacked Bien Hoa Air Base and Long Binh Post. By the morning of April 28 troops from the 4th Corps overran ARVN positions at the eastern end of the Newport Bridge.

== Present day ==
Today the division is part of the PAVN’s 4th Corps in the Bình Dương province.
