= Phan Trọng Chinh =

South Vietnamese general (1931–2014)

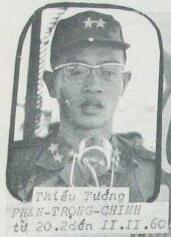
- Phan Trọng Chinh
- Born: 1 February 1931; Bắc Ninh, French Indochina
- Died: 17 November 2014 (aged 83)
- Military career
- Allegiance: State of Vietnam; South Vietnam
- Branch: Vietnamese National Army; Army of the Republic of Vietnam
- Service years: 1951 – 25 October 1955 (Vietnamese National Army); 26 October 1955 – 30 April 1975 (Army of the Republic of Vietnam)
- Rank: Lieutenant general
- Commands: 25th Division; Central Training Command

Phan Trọng Chinh (1 February 1931 – 17 November 2014) was a Lieutenant general of the South Vietnamese Army of the Republic of Vietnam (ARVN).

== Military career ==
In November 1960 Chinh supported the attempted coup against President Ngo Dinh Diem. Following the failure of the coup he was arrested and eventually put on trial in July 1963 and was sentenced to 18 years in prison. However following the successful coup in November 1963 he was released and reinstated in the ARVN.

In 1964 Chinh commanded the 25th Division operating west and northwest of Saigon. The division guarded Highway 4, the major rice supply route to the Mekong Delta, and protected the roads and towns of Tây Ninh, Hậu Nghĩa and Long An provinces (with a total of fourteen districts). Strong Vietcong forces operated in both Hau Hậu Nghĩa and Long An, close to the capital, but the 25th, although reinforced by four Ranger battalions, appeared unable to come to grips with the local VC, or otherwise interfere with their activities. American advisers at Military Assistance Command, Vietnam (MACV) and in the field were puzzled and angry, blaming Chinh's lack of aggressiveness. Unbeknownst to the Americans, however, Nguyễn Cao Kỳ had instructed Chinh to orient the bulk of his unit south as an anticoup force, perhaps as a counter to the neighboring ARVN 5th Division commanded by General Phạm Quốc Thuần, a close friend of Kỳ's rival General Nguyễn Văn Thiệu. Kỳ had given him strict orders not to commit any more than one battalion of each regiment to combat at anyone time. Chinh thus had his hands full providing static security for those provinces under his authority and keeping an eye on the political situation in Saigon. Some of his most critical military operations consisted of merely opening the main roads from time to time so that produce could be brought into the capital and supplies and other goods taken out to the towns and military bases within his jurisdiction. Defeating the enemy was not his first priority.

By late 1965 COMUSMACV General William Westmoreland viewed Chinh's leadership of the 25th Infantry Division as uninspired. The corps senior adviser had requested Chinh's immediate relief, but Westmoreland chose not to press the matter, hoping that combined operations with American forces "will be able to develop the unit." Several months later he noted that the recent arrival of U.S. combat troops in the area was "already causing some increase in the morale of the 25th ARVN Div[ision]," but the unit was still "the weakest division in the ARVN, " barely "hanging on by its teeth in Hậu Nghĩa Province." Westmoreland was well aware that Chinh's close ties with members of the Kỳ Junta made his replacement difficult.

On 9 May 1966 Colonel Cecil F. Hunnicutt became senior adviser to the 25th Division. His immediate superior, Colonel Arndt Mueller, the III Corps deputy senior adviser, ordered him to put some life in the unit and somehow get it moving. At the time, Chinh had delegated control of many of his battalions to the province and district chiefs and had made little effort to supervise their activities. Hunnicutt, later described as a "competent, dynamic officer," pushed Chinh, Chinh's subordinates and his own advisers to greater efforts and the performance of the 25th slowly began to improve." From April to September, relations between Hunnicutt and Chinh were apparently cordial. The American adviser was frank with his counterpart, proposed many operational and personnel changes, and passed on his judgments to Mueller when Chinh failed to act. For example, when Hunnicutt recommended the removal of the Cu Chi district chief for blatant graft and corruption, Chinh unofficially acknowledged the situation but explained that his personal friendship with the accused prevented him from acting. Hunnicutt, however, reported both the case and Chinh's views to Mueller, who promptly informed General Lê Nguyên Khang, the new III Corps commander. Khang took immediate action and relieved the offending officer, severely embarrassing Chinh in the process.

In August, the relationship between Hunnicutt and Chinh grew steadily worse. Frustrated over the performance of the division, Hunnicutt began to exert more pressure, recommending several of Chinh's major commanders for relief and threatening to withdraw the field advisers from units whose performance failed to improve. Shortly thereafter, Hunnicutt pulled his advisory team from the division's reconnaissance company following several incidents of Vietnamese drunkenness and misbehavior, and he also accused several battalion commanders of avoiding engagements with enemy units and falsifying their operational reports. Hunnicutt informed Chinh that the US could not afford to support operations that were not pursued aggressively and achieved so little. He also believed that Chinh was cognizant of his critical monthly evaluation (SAME) reports, but unaware that MACV routinely passed on much of the information directly to the South Vietnamese Joint General Staff (JGS). Tired of Hunnicutt's constant badgering and humiliated by his complaints, Chinh decided to sever his relationship with him. On 28 September he sent a memorandum to Khang, accusing Hunnicutt of submitting "sneaky reports on his division, threatening to pull advisors from units and of being insulting to the 46th and 50th Regiments." He demanded that the III Corps commander remove Hunnicutt as senior adviser within twenty-four hours. The same day Chinh left his headquarters at Đức Hòa district, a few kilometers west of Saigon; Spent two days in the capital; and, upon his return remained in his quarters for several days on the pretext of being ill. Thereafter he avoided Hunnicutt whenever possible.

Upon Hunnicutt's scheduled departure two months later, Chinh made the dispute public through a special "order of the day" to his troops and a slightly more detailed letter to his commanders. Both communications criticized Hunnicutt and those Vietnamese officers in his command who, Chinh felt, had cooperated too closely with their American advisers. Charging that Americans like Hunnicutt had little respect for the Vietnamese and were trying to take over the army by demanding control over all important appointments, Chinh stated that he was currently punishing one subordinate (later identified as the province chief of Long An) because "he only forwards reports to advisors"; "fails to keep his immediate commanders informed"; and, "having first let the means subjugate his mind... has put himself in the hands of the provider of those means" -namely, the Americans. He went on to lecture his subordinates on the need to avoid being subverted by American wealth and power, as well as on the importance of keeping their self-respect and their loyalty to their own superiors. Chinh's accusations were quickly picked up, first by the Vietnamese and then by the American press, causing a sensation in Washington and forcing MACV to take a closer look at the matter. Several days later deputy-COMUSMACV Lieutenant General John A. Heintges flew to Đức Hòa to talk with Chinh. Heintges reported that Chinh appeared contrite and apologetic, worrying about the ruckus he had stirred and blaming irresponsible translators and careless news reporters for misconstruing his words and taking them out of their proper context. Neither Heintges nor Westmoreland believed Chinh's explanation, but felt that his regret was sincere and that Hunnicutt "may have been a little too aggressive in his approach to this supersensitive, complex ridden, apprehensive, unsure, and relatively weak division commander." Heintges considered Chinh's excuse plausible enough for public relations purposes, allowing him to rescind the statements on the pretext that outsiders had misunderstood them. In closing the case, Heintges termed it an isolated incident. Hunnicutt rotated at the end of his normal tour, the recipient of the Legion of Merit for his outstanding performance as senior adviser and Chinh, after publicly recanting his words, now appeared more amicable toward his new adviser.

In 1967 MACV assessed that the three ARVN divisions surrounding Saigon, the 18th, 5th and the 25th Division had shown no improvement and US advisers considered their commanders, Đỗ Kế Giai, Thuần (5th Division) and Chinh (25th Division), flatly incompetent. The senior South Vietnamese military junta generals had repeatedly agreed on the need to replace them, but, for political reasons, had taken no action. When Civil Operations and Revolutionary Development Support Director Robert Komer tried to enlist the aid of Secretary of Defense Robert McNamara to relieve Chinh, Westmoreland upbraided him for bypassing the U.S. military chain of command. Referring to the affair with Hunnicutt in 1966, Westmoreland blamed the American press for Chinh's long tenure, asserting that critical news stories about Chinh had made it impossible for Kỳ to act without appearing to be an American puppet."

In August 1967 JGS Chairman General Cao Văn Viên finally provided Westmoreland with a list of about forty "corrupt, incompetent or old and tired" senior officers that he intended to discharge after the South Vietnamese presidential election scheduled for September. He promised that replacements would be found for Chinh and Thuần and possibly Giai. Finally, in December, perhaps to appease Westmoreland, Viên decided to "remove" Chinh by promoting him to the post of III Corps deputy commander. His American advisers had given Chinh some credit for his interest in the civil matters of his division tactical area and seemed pleased by his new appointment. According to Komer, Chinh was always "a better pacificer than a Division Commander," and the new post would hopefully keep him out of mischief. The new President Thiệu was equally pleased to be able to replace Chinh, an old rival, with a supporter, General Nguyen Xuan Thinh. Westmoreland, noting that Thinh had been relieved as commander of the 22nd Infantry Division in 1965 because of his poor performance, was not enthusiastic about the choice, but he could only hope that he would do better than his predecessor.

In April 1970 Chinh became Central Training Command director, replacing General Nguyễn Phước Vĩnh Lộc. It was suggested that Thiệu arranged the transfer so that Chinh would not be commanding troops in the Saigon area while III Corps commander Đỗ Cao Trí was away commanding ARVN forces in the Cambodian Campaign. Brigadier general Stanley L. McClellan, the MACV training director as of June 1971 described Chinh as "a dynamic prime-mover in the training business" and noted the judgment of COMUSMACV General Creighton Abrams that Chinh "has no equal in the matter of training leadership.", if so, Chinh had turned over a new leaf, or, more likely, American evaluations were once again becoming too optimistic.

== Awards and decorations ==
- South Vietnam :
  - Grand Officer of the National Order of Vietnam
  - Military Merit Medal
  - Army Distinguished Service Order, Second Class
  - Gallantry Cross
  - Hazardous Service Medal
  - Wound Medal
  - Armed Forces Honor Medal, First Class
  - Leadership Medal, Level Unknown
  - Staff Service Medal, First Class
  - Civil Actions Medal, First Class
  - Good Conduct Medal, Third Class
  - Vietnam Campaign Medal
  - Military Service Medal, Third Class
  - Air Service Medal, First Class
  - Navy Service Medal, First Class
  - Chuong My Medal, Second Class
  - Administrative Service Medal, Second Class
- France :
  - Croix de guerre des théâtres d'opérations extérieures
- USA :
  - Officer of the Legion of Merit
