= Lê Nguyên Vỹ =

South Vietnamese general (1933–1975)

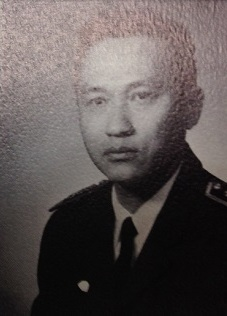
- Born: August 22, 1933; Sơn Tây, Tonkin, French Indochina
- Died: April 30, 1975 (aged 41) Lai Khê, Republic of Vietnam
- Allegiance: State of Vietnam; South Vietnam
- Branch: Vietnamese National Army; Army of the Republic of Vietnam
- Service years: 1951–1975
- Rank: Brigadier General (Chuẩn Tướng)
- Children: 4

Lê Nguyên Vỹ (22 August 1933, Sơn Tây, Tonkin, French Indochina – 30 April 1975, Saigon, Republic of Vietnam) was a general in the Army of the Republic of Vietnam.

== Education ==
In 1951, he graduated from the officers candidate course in the Regional Military School, Military Region II at Phu Bai near the city of Huế.

== Military service ==
In 1965 he was promoted to major. He was the commander of 5th Infantry Division at Lai Khe. He was born in Sơn Tây province, North Vietnam. As a deputy Commander of the 5th Infantry, He fought fiercely during the Battle of An Lộc and later was promoted to the CO of the division.

After receiving the order to surrender after the communist North Vietnamese and Việt Cộng captured Saigon, on April 30, 1975 at 11:00 AM, he committed suicide with his pistol at the division headquarters in Lai Khe.
