= Battle of Snuol =

Part of the Vietnam War (1971)

- Part of the Vietnam War
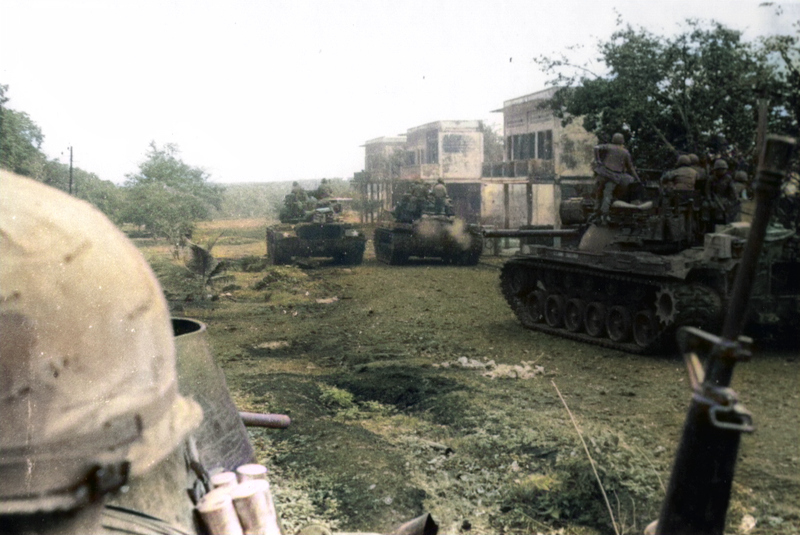
- US Tank entering city of Snuol
Date	25 – 30 May 1971
Location	12°3′53.6″N 106°25′17.8″E; Snuol District, Cambodia
Result	See Aftermath

Belligerents
South Vietnam; Khmer Republic	North Vietnam (Democratic Kampuchea) Khmer Rouge

Commanders and leaders
Nguyen Van Minh; Nguyễn Văn Hiếu	Bui Thanh Danh; Le Nam Phong

Units involved
(South Vietnam) 5th Infantry Division	(Vietnam) 5th Division; 7th Division

Strength
8,000	20,000

Casualties and losses
133 killed 130 missing 494 wounded	1,143 killed (claimed by South Vietnam)

The Battle of Snuol, fought in Snuol, Cambodia, was a major battle of the Vietnam War, between the Army of the Republic of Vietnam (ARVN) and the People's Army of Vietnam (PAVN) as part of Operation Toan Thang 1/71. The battle lasted from 25 to 30 May 1971.

== Background ==
Operation Toan Thang 1/71 was launched with the purpose of destroying PAVN and Khmer Rouge bases and to help the Cambodian forces reestablish control over the area north of Highway 7 up to the Mekong River town of Kratié. Despite some engagements in late February, mid-March and early April the PAVN largely avoided contact.

== Battle ==
In late May the PAVN learned that the South Vietnamese planned to withdraw a task force of the 5th Infantry Division from Snuol. On 25 May, three PAVN regiments massed to cut Highway 13, thereby trapping the task force in Snuol. Intense antiaircraft fire prevented the allies from resupplying the town by air, and after three days of fighting the South Vietnamese position became untenable. The South Vietnamese sent a brigade-size relief column up Highway 13 from South Vietnam to link up with the beleaguered contingent as it fought its way out of Snuol. A U.S. adviser described the scene: "What had been a controlled operation was turned into a rout as units that were supposed to occupy night defensive positions continued down the road and suffered heavy personnel and equipment losses."

== Aftermath ==
By the time the relief operation ended on 31 May the PAVN had lost 1,143 dead and 186 weapons in the fight, while the South Vietnamese had lost 133 killed, 494 wounded, 130 missing, 947 individual weapons, 83 crew-served weapons, 41 mortars and artillery pieces, 198 armored personnel carriers, 6 tanks and 41 vehicles.

The PAVN claim to have eliminated 14,000 ARVN and 6,000 Khmer National Army troops, destroyed over 1,500 vehicles (including 369 tanks and armored vehicles) and 169 artillery pieces and shot down 200 aircraft and captured 700 prisoners, 1,800 weapons, 34 vehicles and other ammunition and supplies during the operation.

The battle rendered the ARVN 5th Division combat ineffective in the estimation of its American advisers. According to II Field Force, Vietnam commander Michael S. Davison, the 5th Division troops were close to mutiny.
