= Phạm Quốc Thuần =

South Vietnamese military officer (1926–2023)

- Born: August 31, 1926; Hà Tây province, Tonkin, French Indochina
- Died: August 18, 2023 (aged 96); Fountain Valley, California
- Military career
- Allegiance: State of Vietnam; South Vietnam
- Branch: Vietnamese National Army; Army of the Republic of Vietnam
- Rank: Lieutenant general
- Commands: 5th Division; III Corps

Lieutenant General Pham Quoc Thuan (31 August 1926 – 18 August 2023) was an officer of the Army of the Republic of Vietnam (ARVN). He served as commander of the 5th Division and later of III Corps.

== Biography ==
He served as commander of the 5th Division from 1962 and was a protégé of Nguyễn Văn Thiệu. Following the Battle of Đồng Xoài in June 1965, when the 5th Division 1st Battalion, 7th Infantry Regiment was ambushed by Viet Cong forces in the Thuận Lợi rubber plantation suffering heavy losses, the Division's US adviser reported that Thuần, had "gone to pieces" over the mauling his 7th Regiment had received.

In 1966 US advisers regarded Thuần's 5th Division and the 25th Division as the two worst units in the ARVN. In 1967 MACV assessed that the three ARVN divisions surrounding Saigon, the 5th, 18th and the 25th Division had shown no improvement, and US advisers considered their commanders, Thuần, Đỗ Kế Giai (18th Division) and Phan Trọng Chinh (25th Division), flatly incompetent. The senior Junta generals had repeatedly agreed on the need to replace them, but for political reasons had taken no action.

Although assessed by American leaders as corrupt and incapable, Thuần had strong political ties with the Junta generals, particularly Thiệu. John Paul Vann noted the widespread public belief that Thuần controlled most of the local bars and prostitution houses and extorted protection fees for convoys moving through his Division tactical area. General William E. DePuy, commanding the nearby US 1st Infantry Division, agreed. He made the convoy protection charge public, as did a local Vietnamese province chief, perhaps with Vann's encouragement. COMUSMACV General William Westmoreland could do little.

Pham had already taken up the matter previously with Chief of the Joint General Staff General Cao Văn Viên, to no avail. Thuần had been Thieu's chief of staff when the latter commanded the 5th Division in 1962. The division, together with General Du Quoc Dong's airborne units, remained Thiệu's major power center. In the interests of political stability, nothing could be done.

In September 1968 MACV rated Thuần as inept and 5th Division advisers noted that the Division had "withdrawn into a shell" and was doing nothing constructive." Minor incidents, like Thuần's daily pot shots at birds from the second story balcony of his home and the subsequent accidental wounding of his intelligence adviser, were not uncommon and at times trivialized and mocked the entire war effort. II Field Force, Vietnam commander Lt. Gen. Walter T. Kerwin, Jr. appealed to COMUSMACV General Creighton Abrams for help, and the MACV commander reportedly "raised hell" with President Thiệu over the matter, but Thiệu did nothing.

In August 1969 Thuần was removed and replaced by General Nguyễn Văn Hiếu.

Pham served as the commander of III Corps, which oversaw the region of the country surrounding the capital Saigon, from 29 October 1973 until 30 October 1974, when he was replaced by Lieutenant General Dư Quốc Đống.

Phạm Quốc Thuần died in Fountain Valley, California on 18 August 2023, at the age of 96.

== Awards and decorations ==
- South Vietnam:
  - Commander of the National Order of Vietnam
