= Đức Phong Camp =

Site information
- Type: Army Base

Location
- Coordinates: 11.8°N 107.23°E

Site history
- Built: 1966
- In use: 1966-74
- Battles/wars: Vietnam War

Garrison information
- Occupants: 5th Special Forces Group; South Vietnamese Regional Force

Đức Phong Airfield
- IATA: none; ICAO: none

Summary
- Elevation AMSL: 919 ft (280 m)
- Interactive map of Đức Phong Airfield

Runways
Direction	Length		Surface
Direction	ft	m	Surface
	3,000	914	laterite/PSP

Đức Phong Camp (also known as Đức Phong Special Forces Camp) is a former U.S. Army and Army of the Republic of Vietnam (ARVN) base east of Sông Bé in southern Vietnam.

== History ==
The 5th Special Forces Group Detachment A-343 first established a base here in 1966. The base was located 30 km east of Sông Bé and 48 km northeast of Đồng Xoài.

On 9 February 1965 the base was overrun by the Vietcong, but was reoccupied by ARVN forces the following day. SGT James McLean, an adviser from Advisory Team 88, Military Assistance Command, Vietnam was captured in the attack and later died in captivity.

In August 1969 the 3rd Mike Force launched Operation Bull Run I against the PAVN 5th Division near Đức Phong.

The base was handed over to the South Vietnamese Regional Force in May 1970.
