= Bến Cát =

Bến Cát Phường Bến Cát Mỹ Phước, Lai Khê
- Ward
- Interactive map of Bến Cát
- Coordinates: 11°9′6.5″N 106°35′36.0″E
- Country: Vietnam
- Municipality: Ho Chi Minh City
- Established: June 16, 2025

Area
  - Total: 38.95 sq mi (100.89 km^{2})

Population (2024)
  - Total: 97,928
  - Density: 2,513.9/sq mi (970.64/km^{2})
- Time zone: UTC+07:00 (Indochina Time)
- Administrative code: 25813

Bến Cát (Vietnamese: Phường Bến Cát) is a ward of Ho Chi Minh City, Vietnam. It is one of the 168 new wards, communes and special zones of the city following the reorganization in 2025.

== History ==
On June 16, 2025, the National Assembly Standing Committee issued Resolution No. 1685/NQ-UBTVQH15 on the arrangement of commune-level administrative units of Ho Chi Minh City in 2025 (effective from June 16, 2025). Accordingly, the entire land area and population of Tân Hưng, Lai Hưng communes of the former Bàu Bàng district and the majority of land area and population of Mỹ Phước ward of the former Bến Cát city will be integrated into a new ward named Bến Cát (Clause 95, Article 1).
