= Lai Khê Base Camp =

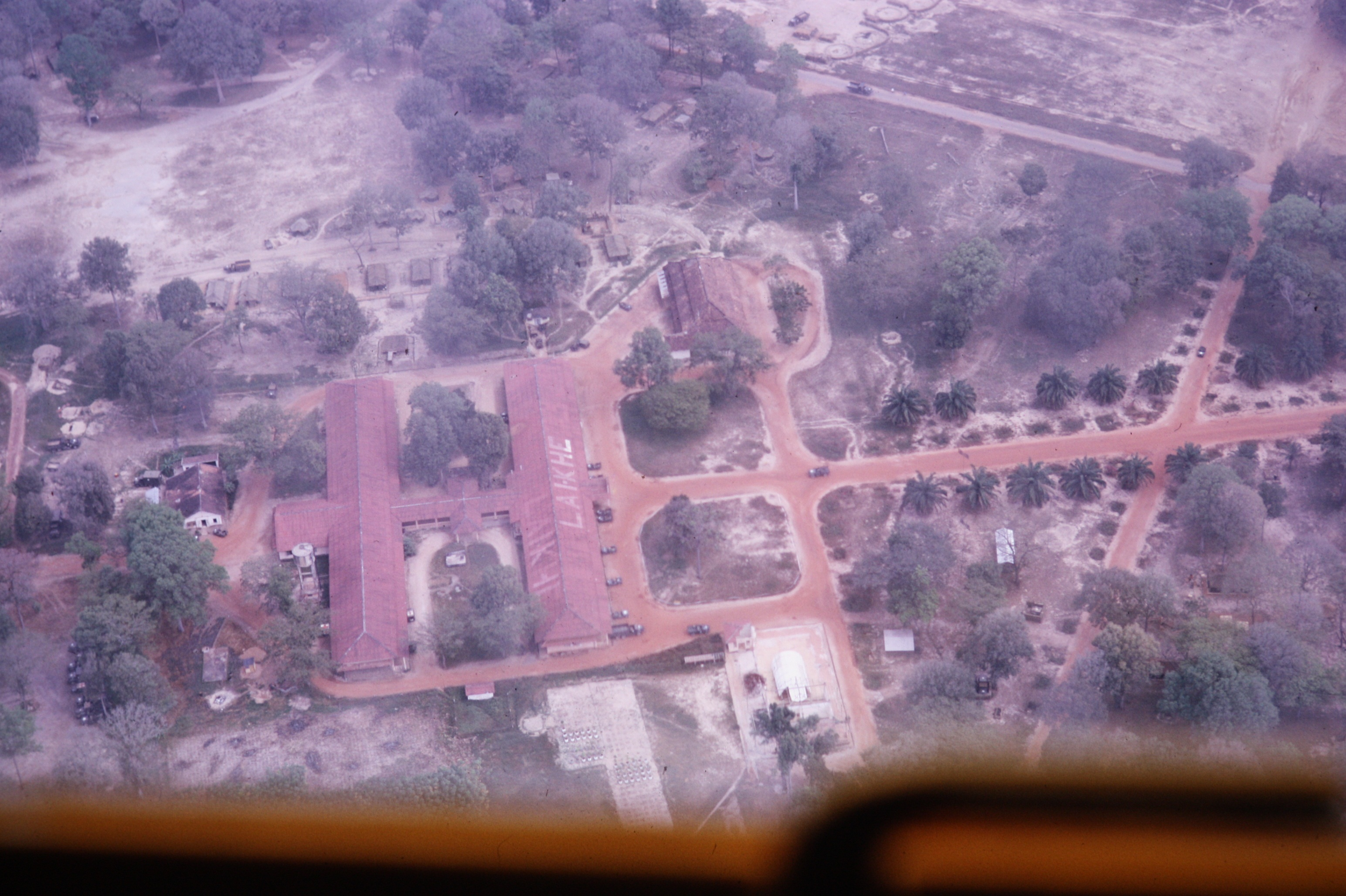
- Lai Khe from the air in 1965

Site information
- Type: Army Base

Location
- Location within Vietnam
- Coordinates: 11.195°N 106.617°E

Site history
- In use: 1960-1975
- Battles/wars: Vietnam War

Garrison information
- Occupants: ARVN 5th Division; US 1st Infantry Division

Lai Khê Airfield
- IATA: none; ICAO: none

Summary

Lai Khê Base Camp was a former Army of the Republic of Vietnam (ARVN) and U.S. Army base, located along Highway 13 to the northwest of Saigon and about 20 km north of Thủ Dầu Một in southern Vietnam.

== History ==
During the Vietnam War Lai Khê was a garrison town as the ARVN 5th Division was based there for most of the 1960s/70s.

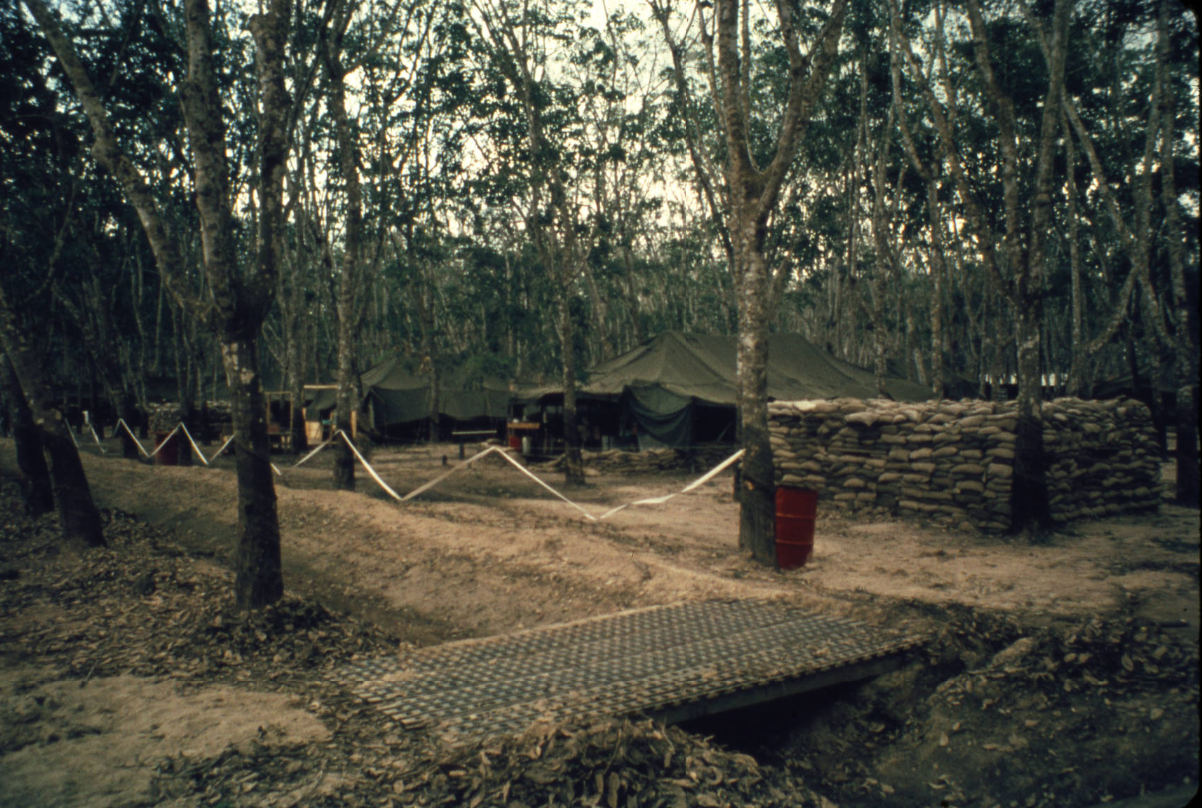
Lai Khe barracks, 24 April 1967

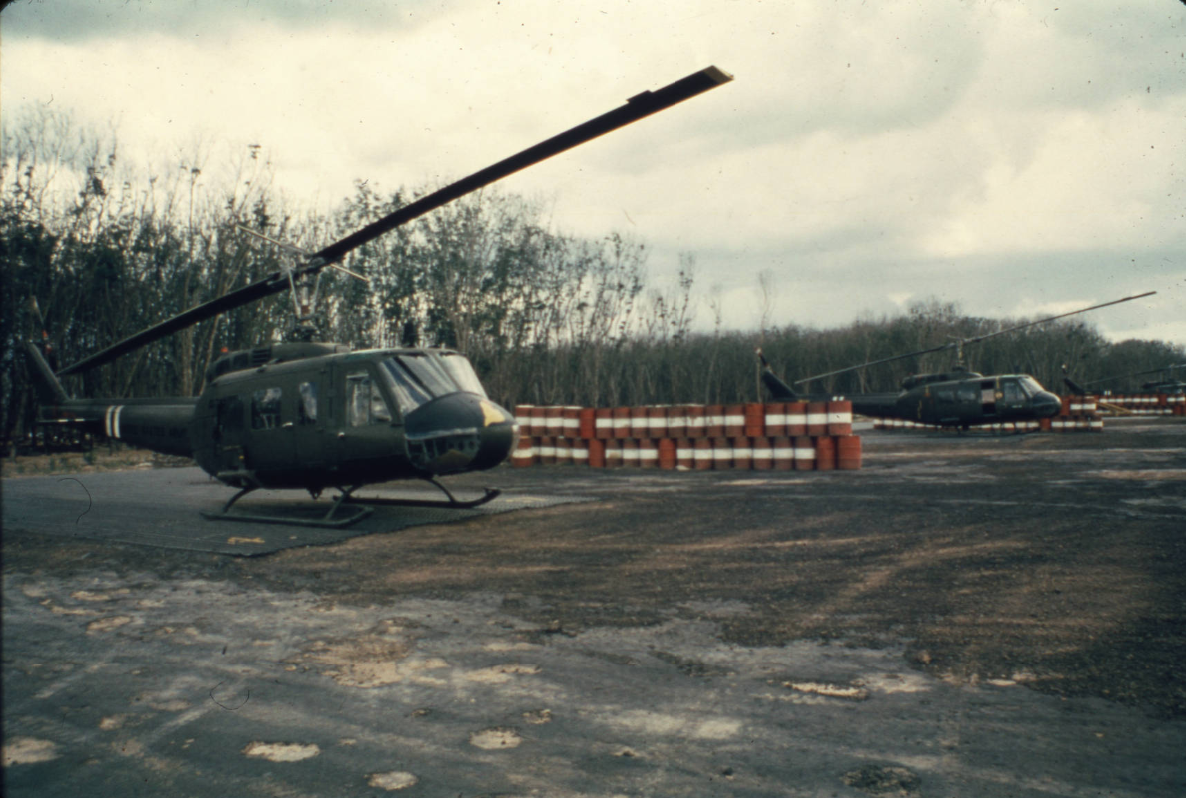
Lai Khe helicopter revetments, 24 April 1967

Lai Khê was also the Headquarters for the U.S. Army's 1st Infantry Division from October 1967 until January 1970.

Other U.S. Army units based at Lai Khê included:

- 121st Signal Battalion (1965-1970)
- 2nd Surgical Hospital (1968-March 1970)
- 2nd Battalion, 5th Cavalry (April–December 1969)
- 5th Battalion, 7th Cavalry (April–December 1969)
- 11th Armored Cavalry Regiment (February 1969)
- 6th Battalion, 15th Artillery (May 1967-July 1968)
- 18th Surgical Hospital (December 1967-February 1968)
- 2nd Battalion, 33rd Artillery (July 1967-April 1970)
- 173rd Assault Helicopter Company (1966 - March 1972)
- 554th Engineer Battalion (October 1969 – 1971)
- 337th Radio Research Company, 303rd Radio Research Battalion, 509th Radio Research Group (ASA)
- 4th Platoon of the 45th Medical Company (Air Ambulance) [AKA "Dustoff"] (June 1966 - February 1969)
- 1st Squadron, 9th Cavalry
  - Bravo Troop
  - Echo Troop - formed here on September 1, 1970

On 28 July 1971 a PAVN/VC sapper attack on the base destroyed four U.S. helicopters and damaged a fifth.

== Current use ==
Most of the base has been turned over to housing and farmland while part of the base remains in use by the People's Army of Vietnam.
