= First Battle of Loc Ninh =

Part of the Vietnam War (1967)

- Part of Operation Shenandoah II of the Vietnam War
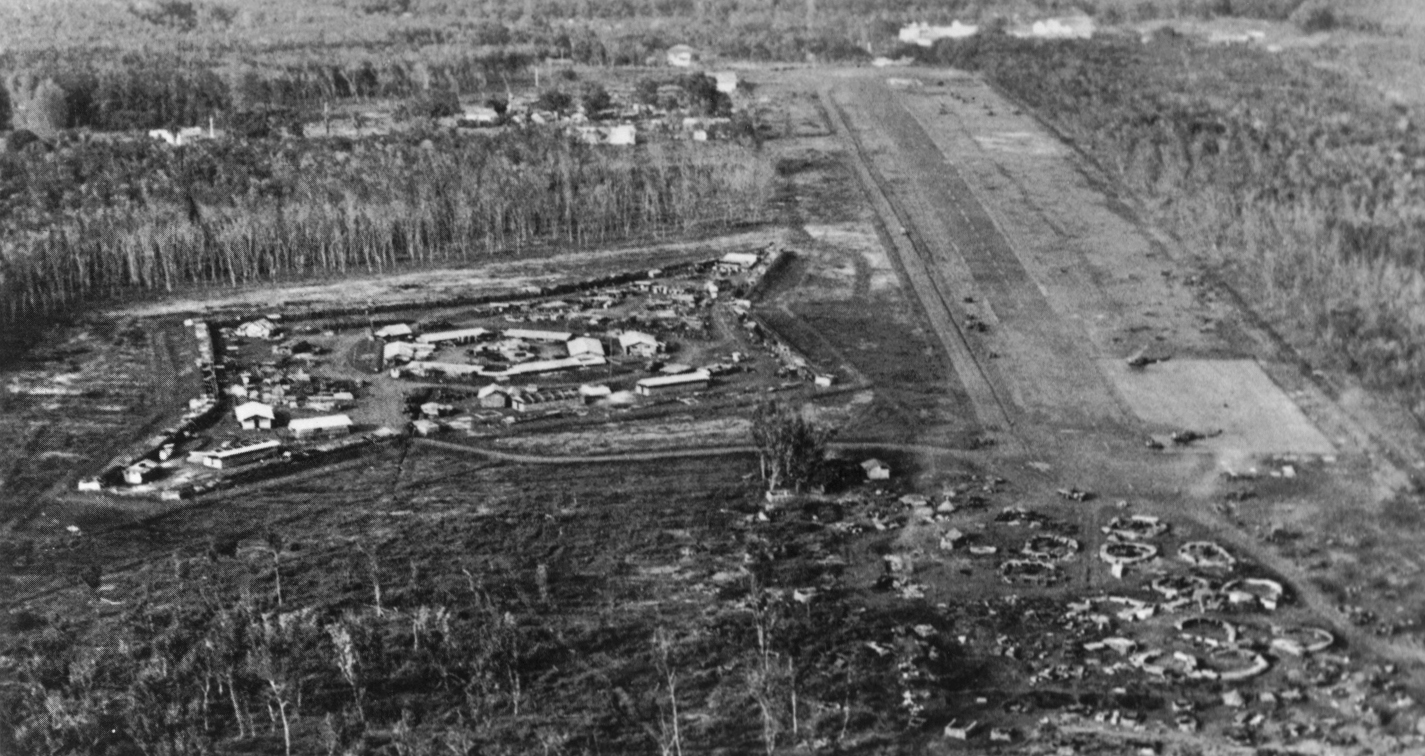
- Civilian Irregular Defense Group compound and Loc Ninh Airstrip with Battery A, 6th Battalion, 15th Artillery, position in the foreground.
| Date | 29 October – 7 November 1967 |
| Location | Lộc Ninh (now in Bình Phước Province), South Vietnam |
| Result | American and South Vietnamese victory |

Belligerents
| United States; South Vietnam | Viet Cong |

Commanders and leaders
| John H. Hay | Hoàng Cầm |

Units involved
| (United States) 1st Infantry Division (South Vietnam) ARVN Rangers (South Vietnam) South Vietnamese Regional Force (South Vietnam) Civilian Irregular Defense Group | 9th Division |

Casualties and losses
| 50 killed | U.S body count: ~852 |

The First Battle of Loc Ninh during the Vietnam War occurred between 29 October and 7 November 1967, fought by the Viet Cong, Army of the Republic of Vietnam (ARVN), Civilian Irregular Defense Group and the United States Army.

The battle was part of the Operation Shenandoah II campaign. This battle represented the first time that Central Office for South Vietnam (COSVN) had coordinated attacks from different divisions, and was intended as "rehearsal" to experiment with urban-fighting techniques to be used for the Tet Offensive in 1968.

Operational goals of COSVN were in part, to draw US and ARVN forces away from the cities in an upsurge of activity, in preparation for the Tet Offensive.

== Background ==
Loc Ninh is a town located in Binh Long Province, approximately 9 miles (14 km) east of the Cambodian border and 70 miles (110 km) north of Saigon. As a part of his strategic preparations for the Tet Offensive in early 1968, General Võ Nguyên Giáp began attacking isolated allied bases in the fall of 1967 in hopes he could draw US and Army of the Republic of Vietnam (ARVN) forces outside of several major South Vietnamese cities. The principal forces left to guard Loc Ninh included three companies of the Civilian Irregular Defense Group (CIDG), a company of South Vietnamese Regional Forces, and a platoon of South Vietnamese Popular Forces.

In late September and early October patrols from the Loc Ninh Special Forces Camp had discovered an engineering company from the Viet Cong (VC) 9th Division building a large hospital on the Sông Bé River several kilometers west of Loc Ninh and elements of the 84A Artillery Regiment, which operated in support of VC infantry, camped within a few kilometers of Loc Ninh. Allied intelligence also obtained documents indicating that the VC 9th Division would begin a major operation in Bình Long Province on or about 25 October. II Field Force commander Lieutenant General Frederick C. Weyand ordered Major General John H. Hay to prepare contingency plans for the defense of the district capitals of Loc Ninh and Sông Bé.

== Battle of Loc Ninh ==
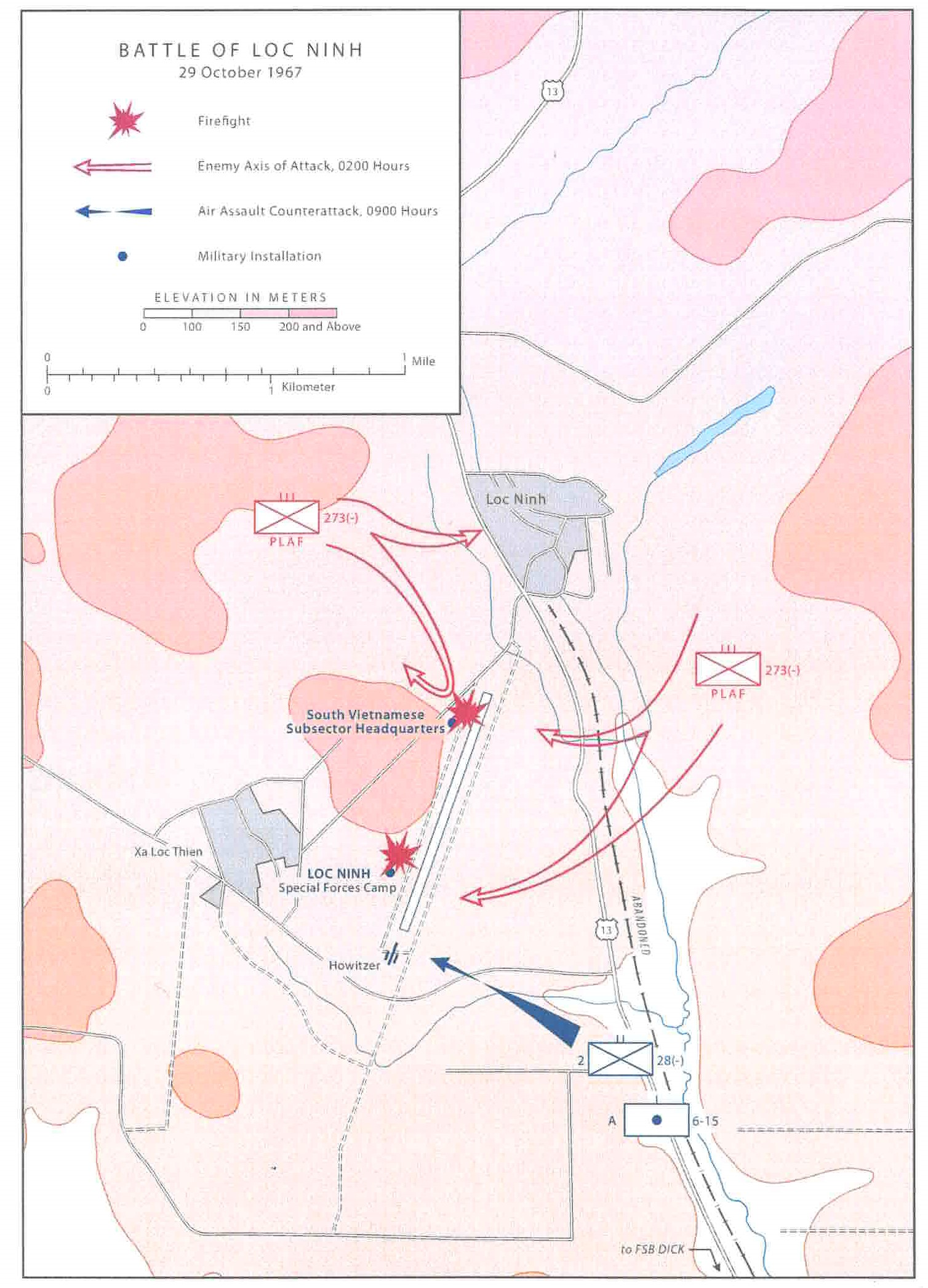
Battle of Loc Ninh, 29 October 1967

At 01:00 on 29 October, the 9th Division attacked Loc Ninh starting with a barrage of 122 mm rockets, and 82 mm and 120 mm mortar rounds against the Special Forces camp and the South Vietnamese district headquarters. The defenders responded with their own mortar fire and called for support. At 02:00, VC sappers attacked the district headquarters detonating satchel charges on the northern perimeter wire clearing the way for two battalions of the 273rd Regiment. The defenders withdrew into the south of the compound. A pair of US UH-1B helicopter gunships arrived on the scene and began attacking the VC and were soon joined by an AC-47 Spooky gunship which poured fire on VC reserve forces in the nearby treeline. Despite this air support, the situation in the compound remained desperate and the district chief called for a proximity fuse artillery barrage on his own position which caused devastating losses to the exposed VC. At 04:00, the VC withdrew pursued by air and artillery strikes. At dawn, the ARVN found that some VC had stayed behind in bunkers in the compound, and after reinforcements arrived they proceeded to methodically clear them out using M72 LAW rockets. One hundred thirty-five VC had been killed in the attacks on Loc Ninh while the ARVN lost 8 killed and 33 wounded.

Also on the morning of 29 October, two companies from the 2nd Battalion, 28th Infantry Regiment and a battery of 105 mm. howitzers were flown into Loc Ninh to set up a firebase at the southwest corner of the airstrip. By 09:50, the battery was operational and conducting preparatory fire for the landing of the 1st Battalion, 18th Infantry Regiment 3.5 kilometers (2.2 mi) to the northwest near the hamlet of Srok Silamite. The battalion landed unopposed and established a defensive perimeter to establish a firebase. At 12:00, a CIDG company radioed that it had engaged a PAVN platoon one kilometer north of the landing zone and Company C 1/18th Infantry was sent to support the CIDG company, hitting the PAVN from behind, killing nine and scattering the rest. Two more PAVN platoons then counterattacked Company C and Company D was sent in a flanking attack forcing the PAVN to withdraw. Five PAVN had been killed and documents on them indicated that they were from the PAVN 165th Regiment.

The 9th Division commander, Senior Colonel Hoàng Cầm, sent a battalion from the PAVN 165th Regiment to engage the US forces. On the morning of 30 October, the 165th Regiment attacked Company A, 1/18th Infantry, as it was reconnoitering the area around the landing zone. Company D and a CIDG company were immediately sent to assist forcing the PAVN back to a low hill where they took refuge in some shallow irrigation trenches. The US forces called in air and artillery strikes and then the CIDG forces attacked forcing the PAVN into a gully where they were hit by further air and artillery strikes. 83 PAVN had been killed and 32 weapons were captured. Hay pored over the intelligence that trickled into his headquarters looking for signs of the enemy’s next move. From captured documents and prisoner interrogation reports, Hay knew that he faced the 165th and 273rd Regiments along with elements from the 141st Regiment.

Hay ordered the 1st Brigade to move its headquarters to Quản Lợi Base Camp to prepare for a renewed attack on Loc Ninh. Just after midnight on 31 October, rockets and mortar shells began pounding the district compound, the Special Forces camp, and the airstrip artillery firebase. As the barrage ended, helicopter gunships and an AC-47 arrived over Loc Ninh and began firing on suspected assembly areas. They were met by heavy machine gun fire from the PAVN 208th Anti-Aircraft Battalion which a forward air controller later said was the heaviest antiaircraft fire he had ever seen in South Vietnam. At approximately 02:00 hundreds of 272nd Regiment troops emerged from the treeline on the eastern side of the airstrip. Their attack was met by interlocking fire from the three US/ARVN positions around the airstrip. A small group of VC made it across the airstrip and fought their way into the district headquarters compound, however as no follow-up troops were able to advance they soon abandoned their attack and withdrew. At dawn the 272nd Regiment withdrew east, leaving 110 dead. ARVN/US losses were nine killed and 59 wounded. The 1/28th Infantry was sent southeast of Loc Ninh in pursuit of the 272nd Regiment and killed 11 VC over the next two days, but failed to locate the main body of the 272nd Regiment.

On the evening of 1 November, the 84A Artillery Regiment hit Loc Ninh with mortar and rocket fire and a battalion from the 272nd Regiment then hit the district compound with machine gun fire, however, this attack was just a diversion, and at 00:30 on 2 November, 82-mm mortar shells began to hit the 1/18th Infantry firebase. US night observation posts around the base reported that VC forces were converging, detonated their Claymore mines and retreated into the base perimeter. The VC sprayed the base with fire to try to locate the US heavy weapons positions but the US troops had been ordered to hold their fire. When VC mortars began firing on the base they were engaged by helicopter gunships which were then met by antiaircraft fire from at least 12 heavy machine guns and fighter-bombers were called in to silence these. At 04:15, the 273rd Regiment began its attack which was met with intense defensive fire. Faced with this by 04:45, the VC began to withdraw. At dawn, the 1/18th policed the perimeter finding 263 VC dead while drag marks and blood trails suggested their losses were even higher. US losses were one killed and eight wounded.

On 2 November, 1st Brigade was given operational control over the 3rd Brigade's 1st Battalion, 26th Infantry Regiment which made an unopposed landing four kilometers (2.5 mi) northwest of Loc Ninh and the 2nd Battalion, 12th Infantry Regiment, from the 25th Infantry Division which made an unopposed landing 6 km northeast of Loc Ninh. There were now four US infantry battalions deployed around Loc Ninh. That evening Cầm sent the 1st Battalion, 272d Regiment to assault the 2/12th Infantry position hoping to catch them before they had time to fortify their base. The attack began at 02:30 on 3 November, but was quickly forced back by the already entrenched infantry and artillery and air support. The VC withdrew at 04:00, leaving 57 dead and seven wounded, while US losses were four killed.

On 6 November, the 1/26th Infantry moved to a new firebase northeast of Loc Ninh and began probing east towards where the 272nd Regiment was believed to be regrouping. The 1/18th Infantry returned to Quản Lợi and the 2/12th Infantry was redeployed to Sông Bé. Part of the 2/28th Infantry remained at its firebase at Loc Ninh airstrip.

On the morning of 7 November, with Company A remaining to guard their firebase, the rest of 1/26 Infantry left to patrol a dirt road bordered by a rubber plantation. At 13:05, the column moved into the rubber trees and the lead company was quickly ambushed by VC from the 3rd Battalion, 272nd Regiment in the plantation while small arms and machine gun fire raked the column on the road. VC fire killed Colonel Arthur Stigall, the battalion commander and his command group, wounded two company commanders and disabled most of their radios. Company D was at the rear of the column and its commander Captain Raymond H. Dobbins was able to maneuver troops to prevent the VC from outflanking the column. Dobbins assumed temporary command of the battalion, calling in air and artillery strikes to cover the unit as it withdrew to a more defensible position. After an hour the VC broke contact, with 66 killed. US losses were 18 killed and 22 wounded. For their actions in this engagement Sergeant Robert F. Stryker of Company C was posthumously awarded the Medal of Honor and Company C first sergeant Pascal Poolaw was posthumously awarded the Silver Star. The reinforcements swung the momentum of the fight and with no further VC activity Hay concluded that the VC had disengaged and retreat to its sanctuaries across the border in Cambodia.

== Aftermath ==
The battle was considered a US/ARVN victory with the United States claiming more than 850 PAVN/VC killed. The PAVN/VC had failed to capture Loc Ninh or inflict severe casualties on US forces with Allied losses of only 50 dead. The battle did, however, succeed in drawing Allied forces away from the population centers and into the remote border areas.
