= New Year's Day battle of 1968 =

Battle of the Vietnam War

- Part of the Vietnam War
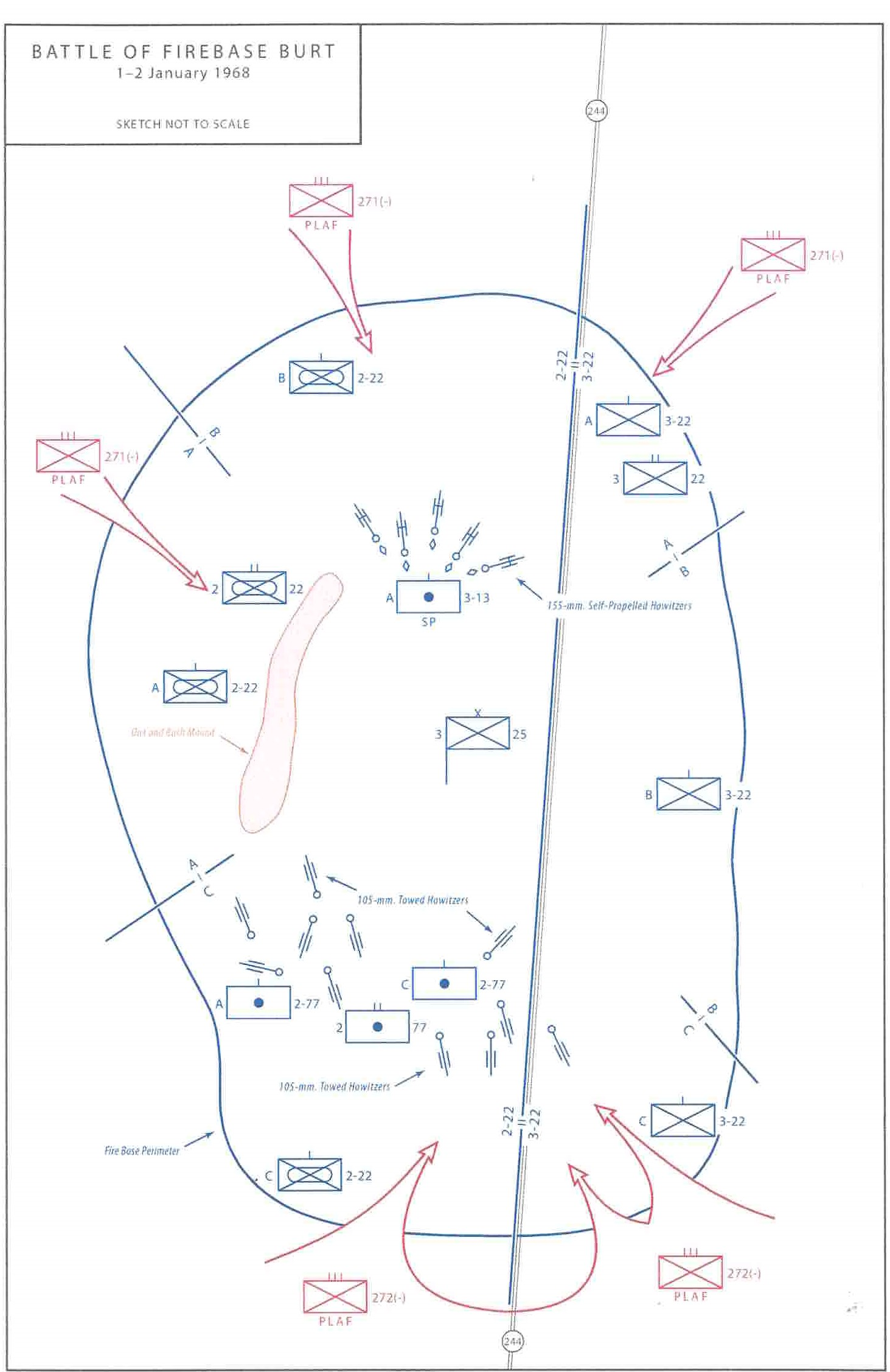
- Map of the battle of Firebase Burt
Date	1–2 January 1968
Location	South Vietnam 11.581°N 106.372°E
Result	American victory

Belligerents
United States	Viet Cong; North Vietnam

Units involved
2nd and 3rd Battalions, 22nd Infantry Regiment; Battery B, 5th Battalion, 2nd Artillery Regiment Battery A, 3rd Battalion, 13th Artillery Regiment; Battery D, 71st Artillery Regiment; Batteries A and C, 2nd Battalion, 77th Artillery Regiment	271st Regiment and 272nd Regiment, 9th Division

Casualties and losses
23 killed	U.S. body count: 348 killed
- Location within Vietnam

The New Year's Day battle of 1968 was a military engagement during the Vietnam War in Tây Ninh province that began on the evening of 1 January 1968. It involved units assigned to the U.S. 25th Infantry Division and two regiments of the People's Army of Vietnam (PAVN). The battle was known as the Battle of Fire Support Base Burt (Battle of FSB Burt), or the Battle of Suoi Cut. This is not the same location as Suối Cắt village in northern Vietnam.

== Background ==
In late 1967, Pope Paul VI had declared 1 January 1968 a day of peace and persuaded the South Vietnamese and the Americans to observe a truce. In a released statement, the Viet Cong (VC) also agreed to observe a 36-hour ceasefire. The 25th Infantry Division had been patrolling the Vietnamese-Cambodian border in Operation Yellowstone to interdict PAVN/VC coming down the Ho Chi Minh trail. The 25th Infantry Division had set up a two-battalion perimeter, the 2nd and 3rd Battalions of the 22nd Infantry Regiment, with artillery 7 miles (11 km) from the Cambodian border in Tay Ninh Province outside a village called Suoi Cut. The fire support position, named Fire Support Base Burt (11.581°N 106.372°E), was located near the junction of Highways 244 and 246, close to Black Virgin Mountain. Troops had that day recently set up a landing zone (LZ) for supply helicopters. Once the helicopter pad had been constructed, supplies could be flown in, and on 1 January the 25th Infantry Division's Christmas mail had arrived. Soldiers spent the day opening packages from their families.

== Battle ==
On the night of 1 January, six hours before the truce was to have ended, a 2,500-man force made up of elements of the 271st and 272nd Regiments of the VC 9th Division attacked the American position. The PAVN/VC attacked in three waves and were able to infiltrate the perimeter. The first wave was launched after a heavy mortar attack at 23:30. A little after midnight, another attack was launched and a third human wave attack around 01:00. The Americans were finally able to repel the attacks by using air and artillery support. Air support was provided by attack helicopters and AC-47 Spooky gunships. In total, 28 air sorties were launched against the PAVN. The Americans said that they counted 348 enemy soldiers killed in the action. By comparison, American forces suffered 23 killed. Last contact with enemy units occurred at 05:15 when they withdrew from the battleground. The remnants of the PAVN/VC were pursued to the south and southeast.

== Aftermath ==
Thirty days later, on 31 January 1968, PAVN and VC forces launched the Tet Offensive throughout South Vietnam. When Oliver Stone returned to the U.S., he was puzzled that the New Year's attack had received no media coverage. For some time, he thought he might have imagined the events of January 1 until, at a reunion of the men of the 25th Infantry Division, other Vietnam vets who were there that night were able to confirm the battle did indeed take place.

== In popular media ==
Among the soldiers serving in the American units during the battle were future writer Larry Heinemann and future film director Oliver Stone. Heinemann later wrote a book about his Vietnam experiences titled Black Virgin Mountain: A Return to Vietnam, and Stone would direct the dramatization of the battle in the 1986 film Platoon. The final battle scene of Platoon is a dramatization of the real battle Stone experienced. Survivors of the battle often relate how close to actual events the fighting was to what is seen on screen.
