= Operation Shenandoah II =

Part of the Vietnam War (1967)

- Part of the Vietnam War
Date	29 September – 10 December 1967
Location	along Highway 13, South Vietnam

Belligerents
United States; South Vietnam	North Vietnam; Viet Cong

Commanders and leaders
MG John H. Hay	General Trần Văn Trà (Vietnam) General Hoàng Văn Thái (Vietnam) Senior Col. Hoàng Cầm

Units involved
(United States) 1st Infantry Division (South Vietnam) Vietnamese Rangers; CIDG; Regional Forces	7th Division; 9th Division

Casualties and losses
274 killed 15 missing	956 killed

Operation Shenandoah II was an operation conducted during the Vietnam War by the U.S. 1st Infantry Division to secure and repair Highway 13, South Vietnam from 29 September to 19 November 1967.

== Background ==
During the 1967–1968 dry season, II Field Force, Vietnam planned to mount a large-scale offensive to cut the three main infiltration routes into III Corps from Cambodia. In order to build up the necessary forces near the Cambodian border and sustain their operations Highway 13 needed to be opened and secured.

Meanwhile, Central Office for South Vietnam (COSVN) commander General Trần Văn Trà pursued a strategy of attrition using his People's Army of Vietnam (PAVN) and Viet Cong (VC) forces to attack U.S. military units and inflict as many casualties as possible hoping the Americans would conclude the war was too costly and withdraw from South Vietnam. Trà's deputy, General Hoàng Văn Thái planned to use the experienced VC 9th Division, commanded by Senior Col. Hoàng Cầm, to spearhead COSVN's dry season offensive in Bình Long Province. The initial target was the district capital of Lộc Ninh with the objectives of neutralizing the U.S. Special Forces and CIDG camp there and embarrassing the South Vietnamese Government.

== Operation ==
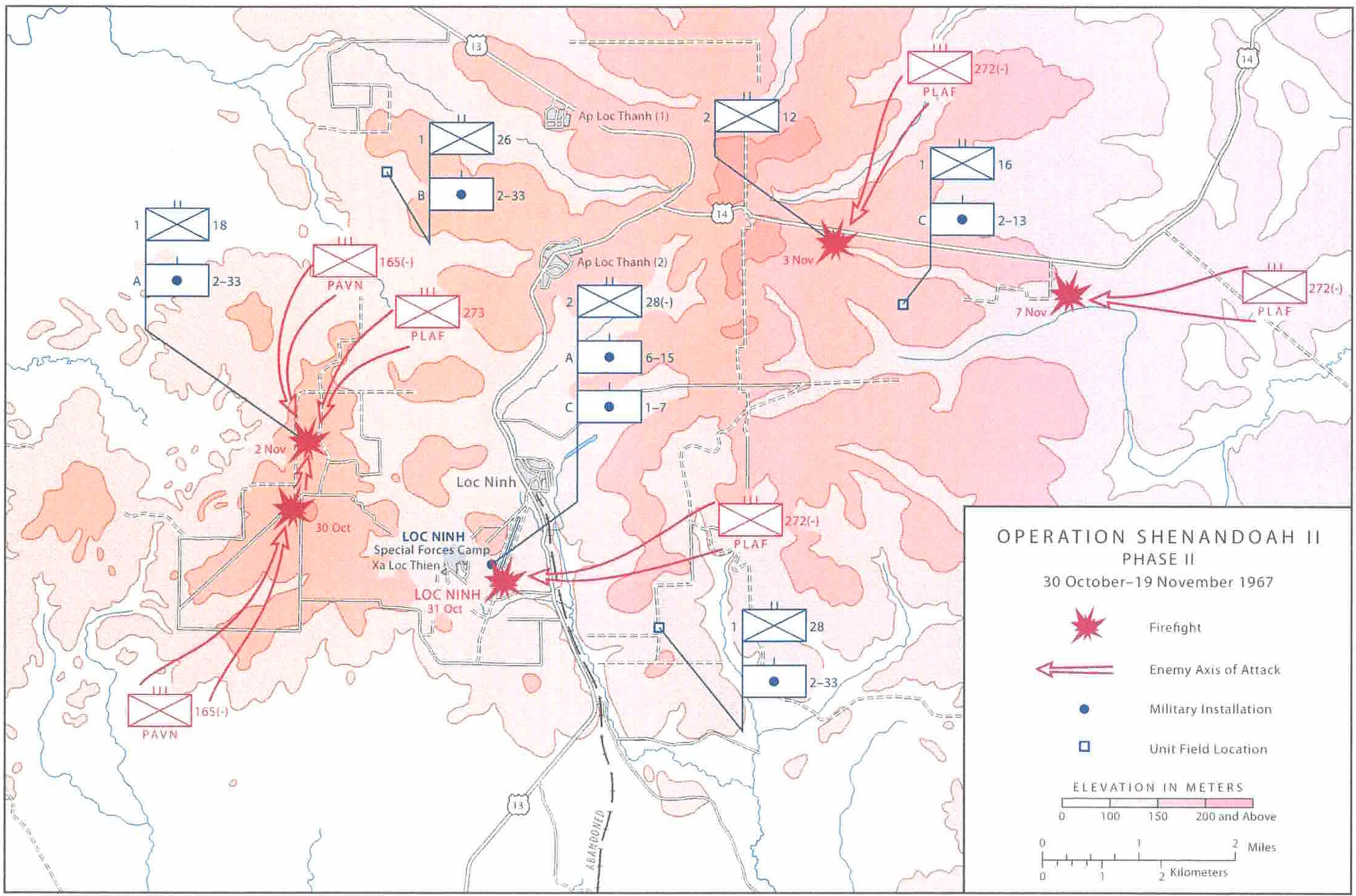
Operation Shenandoah II, 30 October - 19 November 1967

During the first weeks of the operation, the 1st and 3rd Brigades, 1st Division secured Highway 13 between Lai Khê and Chơn Thành District. These forces also swept the Long Nguyen Secret Zone, situated between Highway 13 and the Michelin Rubber Plantation about 56 kilometers (35 mi) northwest of Saigon, in Binh Duong Province.

On 29 September, MG John H. Hay ordered the 1st Brigade (1st Battalion, 2nd Infantry Regiment and 1st Battalion, 28th Infantry Regiment) into the northern part of the Zone. On 30 September, the 3rd Brigade (2/2nd Infantry and 2/28th Infantry) was ordered into the southern half of the Zone. Initially the U.S. forces made little contact with the VC. On 2 October, an Army of the Republic of Vietnam (ARVN) unit operating east of Highway 13 near Chơn Thành engaged a large VC formation and took heavy casualties. Documents found on the dead indicated they had clashed with a battalion-sized unit from the VC 272nd Regiment, sent to attack Chơn Thành in order to cover the movement of the 271st Regiment into the Long Nguyen area.

On 4 October the 1/2d Infantry engaged a VC company 9 km southwest of Chơn Thành, killing 12 before the VC withdrew to the west. To pursue the retreating VC, the 1st Battalion, 18th Infantry Regiment was instructed to conduct an air-assault into a clearing located about 2 kilometers (1.2 mi) west of the 1/2nd Infantry, in order to block enemy troops. The 1/18th Infantry landed unopposed, and they immediately set up a standard field position with wire entanglements to protect the base. On 6 October, the 1/18th Infantry's position was hit by VC mortar fire causing little damage. At 18:00 it began to rain and an hour later the VC started attacking the perimeter from different directions, but the attack was repulsed with the support of artillery and mortar fire. By midnight the fight was over. U.S. casualties were 5 killed and 4 wounded. Three weeks later a captured VC soldier from the 2nd Battalion, 271st Regiment, claimed that his unit lost 59 killed and 56 wounded in the attack.

On 8 October, 1/2nd Infantry was moved to Phước Vĩnh Base Camp to act as the division's reaction force. The 2/28th Infantry was then lifted from Lai Khê and landed about 21 kilometers (13 mi) northwest of Chơn Thành, and 3 kilometers (1.9 mi) north-west of 1/18th Infantry's position. On 10 October 1/2nd Infantry was deployed into new blocking positions, as VC units were believed to be moving toward the Michelin Rubber Plantation. On 11 October 11, two companies from 1/18th Infantry probed northwards and were immediately attacked by the VC. While under heavy fire, the lead company was ordered to pull back behind a perimeter formed by the second company. As the lead company fell back, artillery and air support were called in to pummel the VC's attacking formation. When the battle was over, 21 VC were found dead, whereas U.S. casualties for the day were 1 killed and 4 wounded. On 13 October, 1/18th Infantry was moved to Phước Vĩnh for rest and refitting.

By mid-October, MG Hay believed the VC 271st Regiment had suffered a major defeat and was ready to withdraw from the Long Nguyen Secret Zone, so he was ready to terminate the operation. However, increased VC activity near the Ong Thanh Stream, which flowed near the Binh Duong-Binh Long provincial boundary, where the 1st Brigade made most of its contacts, had indicated otherwise.

=== Battle of Ong Thanh ===
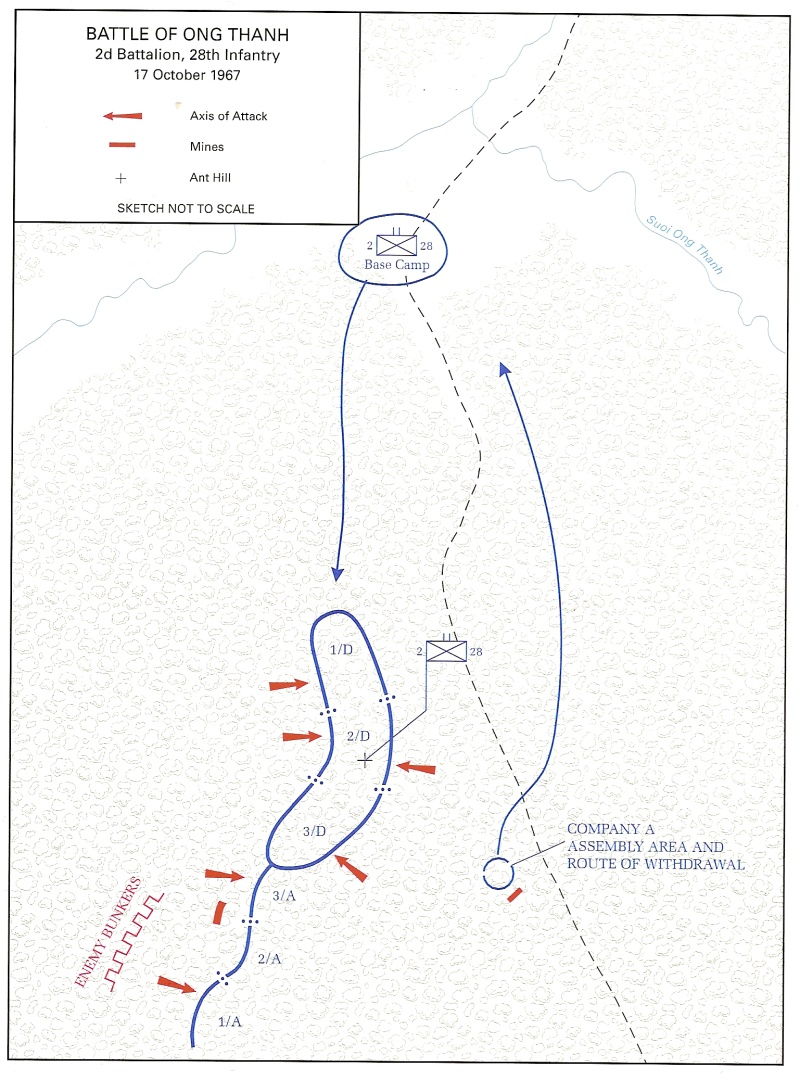
Map of the Battle of Ong Thanh

On the morning of 16 October, two companies of the 2/28th Infantry commanded by Lt Col. Terry de la Mesa Allen Jr. left their night defensive position along the Ong Thanh Stream to patrol an area to the southeast covered by thick jungle canopy. After moving about 2 kilometers (1.2 mi), the battalion found a fortified VC bunker and pulled back to allow airstrikes against the VC positions. When the airstrikes were over, they reentered the camp and a firefight broke out with VC snipers firing down from trees in the surrounding areas. U.S. forces pulled back and artillery strikes were called in against VC bunker positions. They again re-entered the camp, and they discovered the bodies of 17 VC. Moving through the western end of the camp, and another firefight broke out with an estimated 60 VC. Later that afternoon Lt. Col. Allen decided to break contact and return to base, to avoid fighting a battle that could last until the evening. He also called in airstrikes to inflict further damage on the VC.

On the morning of 17 October the 2/28th Infantry renewed their attack against the VC position and at approximately 10:00 they triggered a 3-sided ambush by the 271st Regiment reinforced by 200 soldiers from the VC C1 Company of Rear Service Group 83. At 12:00 the 2/28th Infantry attempted to withdraw but were engaged by intense fire killing Allen among others.

U.S. losses were 64 killed, 75 wounded and 2 missing. VC losses were unknown, the 1st Brigade reported an estimated body count of 101, but the U.S. relief force found only 2 VC dead.

=== First Battle of Loc Ninh ===
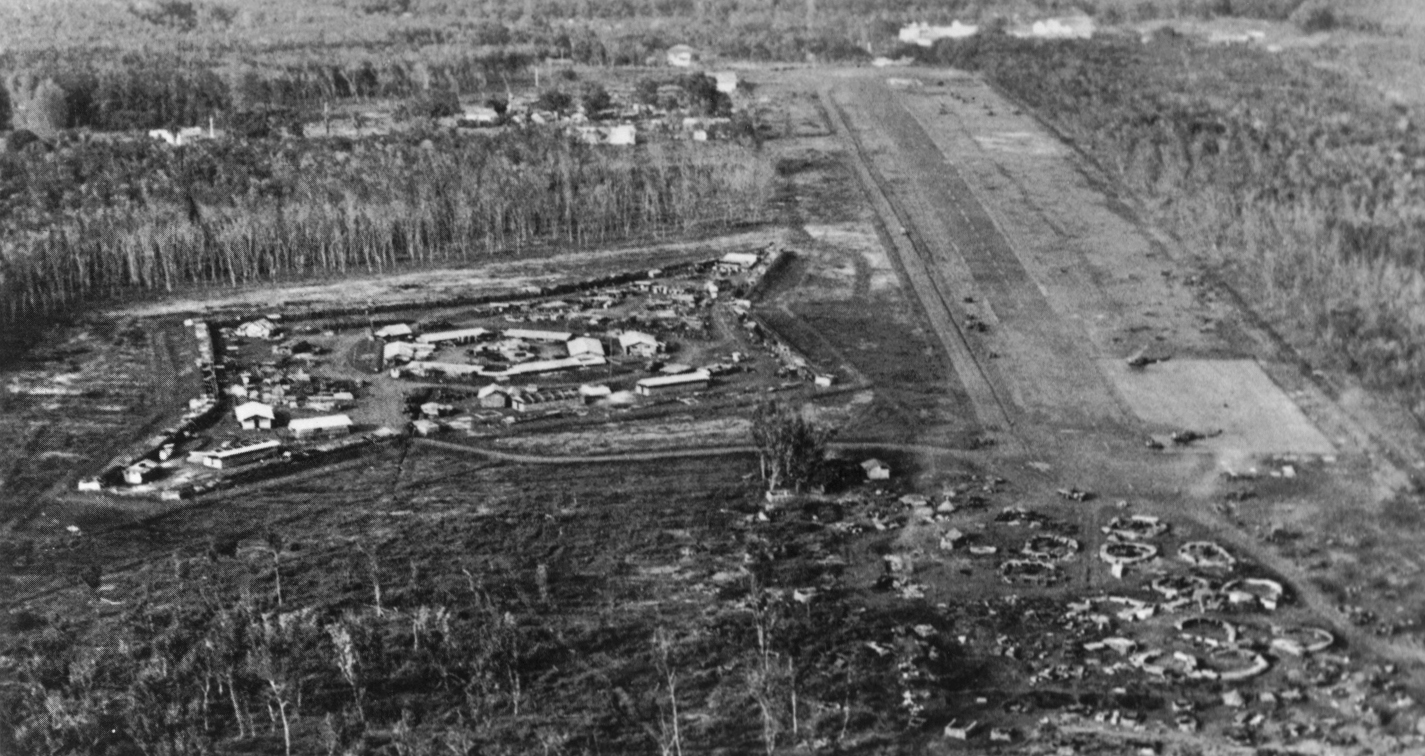
Lộc Ninh Special Forces Camp and airfield

After clearing the Long Nguyen Secret Zone, the next stage of the operation called for the 1st and 3rd Brigades to secure Highway 13 through An Lộc up to Lộc Ninh 25 km farther north, however II Field Force commander LTG Frederick C. Weyand suspended this phase as it became apparent that COSVN was preparing to launch a major offensive in northern III Corps.

In late September and early October patrols from the Lộc Ninh Special Forces Camp discovered an engineer company from the VC 9th Division building a large hospital on the Sông Bé River several kilometers west of Lộc Ninh and elements of the 84A Artillery Regiment (which operated in support of VC infantry) camped within a few kilometers of Lộc Ninh. Allied intelligence also obtained documents indicating that the 9th Division would begin a major operation in Bình Long Province on or about 25 October. LTG Weyand ordered MG Hay to prepare contingency plans for the defense of the district capitals of Lộc Ninh and Sông Bé.

After midnight on 27 October, under cover of mortar fire, the VC 88th Regiment attacked Sông Bé, while 2 PAVN battalions attacked an ARVN 5th Division base camp several kilometers southeast of Sông Bé. The 200 ARVN defenders held on with air support and eventually forced the PAVN to withdraw. A sweep of the battlefield in the morning found 134 PAVN dead and 2 wounded soldiers: 73 abandoned weapons, including 3 flamethrowers and 10 machine guns, were also found. ARVN losses were 5 killed and 7 civilian laborers were also killed. An ARVN Ranger Battalion and the 1/18th Infantry flew into Sông Bé, but the VC had already withdrawn and the 1/18th Infantry returned to Lai Khê on the afternoon of 28 October.

At 01:00 on 29 October the 9th Division attacked Lộc Ninh. The attack opened with a barrage of 122-mm rockets and 82-mm and 120-mm mortar rounds against the Special Forces camp and the South Vietnamese district headquarters. The defenders responded with their own mortar fire and called for support. At 02:00 VC sappers attacked the district headquarters, detonating satchel charges on the northern perimeter wire clearing the way for 2 battalions of the 273d Regiment. The defenders withdrew into the south of the compound. A pair of U.S. UH–1B helicopter gunships arrived on the scene and began attacking the VC and were soon joined by an AC–47 Spooky gunship which poured fire on VC reserve forces in the nearby treeline. Despite the air support, the situation in the compound remained desperate and the district chief called for a Proximity fuse artillery barrage on his own position which caused devastating losses to the exposed VC. At 04:00 the VC withdrew while under fire by air and artillery strikes. At dawn the ARVN found that some VC had stayed behind in bunkers in the compound and after reinforcements arrived they proceeded to methodically clear out the VC using M72 LAW rockets. 135 VC had been killed in the attacks on Lộc Ninh while the ARVN lost 8 killed and 33 wounded.

On the morning of 29 October, two companies from the 2/28th Infantry and a battery of 105-mm howitzers were flown into Lộc Ninh to set up a firebase at the southwest corner of the airstrip. By 09:50 the battery was operational and conducting preparatory fire for the landing of the 1/18th Infantry 3.5 km to the northwest. The battalion landed unopposed and established a defensive perimeter to establish a firebase. At 12:00, a CIDG company radioed that it had engaged a PAVN platoon 1 km north of the landing zone and Company C 2/28th Infantry was sent to support the CIDG company, hitting the PAVN from behind, killing 9 and scattering the rest. Two more PAVN platoons then counterattacked Company C and Company D was sent in a flanking attack forcing the PAVN to withdraw. 5 PAVN had been killed and captured documents indicated they were from the PAVN 165th Regiment.

On the morning of 30 October the 165th Regiment attacked Company A, 1/18th Infantry, as it was reconnoitering the area around its landing zone. Company D and a CIDG company were immediately sent to assist forcing the PAVN back to a low hill where they took refuge in some shallow irrigation trenches. The U.S. forces called in air and artillery strikes and then the CIDG forces attacked forcing the PAVN into a gully where they were hit by further air and artillery strikes. 83 PAVN were killed and 32 weapons were captured.

MG Hay ordered the 1st Brigade to move its headquarters to Quản Lợi Base Camp to prepare for a renewed attack on Lộc Ninh. Just after midnight on 31 October, rockets and mortar shells began pounding the district compound, the Special Forces camp, and the airstrip artillery firebase. As the barrage ended, helicopter gunships and an AC-47 arrived over Lộc Ninh and began firing on suspected assembly areas. They were met by heavy machine gun fire from the PAVN 208th Anti-Aircraft Battalion. At approximately 02:00 hundreds of 272nd Regiment troops emerged from the treeline on the eastern side of the airstrip. Their attack was met by interlocking fire from the 3 U.S./ARVN positions around the airstrip. A small group of VC made it across the airstrip and fought their way into the district headquarters compound. No follow-up troops were able to advance and they soon abandoned their attack and withdrew. At dawn the 272nd Regiment withdrew east, leaving 110 dead. ARVN/U.S. losses were 9 killed and 59 wounded. The 1/28th Infantry was deployed southeast of Lộc Ninh in pursuit of the 272nd Regiment and killed 11 VC over the next two days, but failed to locate main body of the 272nd Regiment.

On the evening of 1 November, the 84A Artillery Regiment hit Lộc Ninh with mortar and rocket fire and a battalion from the 272nd Regiment then hit the district compound with machine gun fire, however this attack was just a diversion and at 00:30 on 2 November 82-mm mortar shells began to hit the 1/18th Infantry firebase. U.S. night observation posts around the base reported VC forces were converging, detonated their Claymore mines and retreated into the base perimeter. The VC sprayed the base with fire to try to locate the U.S. heavy weapons positions but the U.S. troops had been ordered to hold their fire. When VC mortars began firing on the base they were engaged by helicopter gunships which were met by antiaircraft fire from at least 12 heavy machine guns and fighter-bombers were called in to silence these. At 04:15 the 273rd Regiment began its attack which was met with intense defensive fire. By 04:45 the VC began to withdraw. At dawn the 1/18th swept the perimeter finding 263 VC dead while drag marks and blood trails suggested their losses were even higher. U.S. losses were 1 killed and 8 wounded.

On 2 November 1 Brigade was given operational control over the 3rd Brigade's 1st Battalion, 26th Infantry Regiment which made an unopposed landing 4 km northwest of Lộc Ninh and the 2nd Battalion, 12th Infantry Regiment, from the 25th Infantry Division which made an unopposed landing 6 km northeast of Lộc Ninh. There were now 4 U.S. infantry battalions deployed around Loc Ninh. That evening Col. Cầm sent the 1st Battalion, 272d Regiment to assault the 2/12th Infantry position hoping to catch them before they had time to fortify their base. The attack began at 02:30 on 3 November but was quickly forced back by the already entrenched infantry and artillery and air support. The VC withdrew at 04:00 leaving 57 dead and 7 wounded, while U.S. losses were 4 killed.

On 6 November the 1/26th Infantry moved to a new firebase northeast of Lộc Ninh and began probing east towards where the 272nd Regiment was believed to be regrouping. The 1/18th Infantry returned to Quản Lợi and the 2/12th Infantry was redeployed to Sông Bé. Part of the 2/28th Infantry remained at its firebase at Lộc Ninh airstrip.

On the morning of 7 November with Company A remaining to guard their firebase, the rest of 1/26 Infantry left to patrol a dirt road bordered by a rubber plantation. At 13:05 the column moved into the rubber trees where the lead company was ambushed by VC from the 3rd Battalion, 272nd Regiment while small arms and machine gun fire raked the column on the road. VC fire killed the battalion commander and his command group, wounded 2 company commanders and disabled most of their radios. Company D was at the rear of the column and its commander Captain Raymond H. Dobbins was able to maneuver troops to prevent the VC from outflanking to column. Captain Dobbins assumed temporary command of the battalion, calling in air and artillery strikes to cover the unit as it withdrew to a more defensible position. After an hour the VC broke contact leaving 66 dead according to US claims while U.S. losses were 18 killed and 22 wounded.

With no further VC activity MG Hay concluded the VC had disengaged and retreated to its sanctuaries across the border in Cambodia. The Battle of Lộc Ninh was over with the US claiming that the PAVN/VC losses were more than 850 killed while U.S./ARVN losses were 50 killed.

=== Further attacks at Sông Bé and Bo Duc ===
While the VC 9th Division withdrew from Lộc Ninh, elements of the 5th Division were gathering near Sông Bé, 40 km east with the 275th Regiment arriving to join the 88th Regiment.

On the morning of 6 November, elements from the 275th Regiment ambushed a company from the ARVN 5th Infantry Division south of Sông Bé. The forces became intermingled preventing the use of air and artillery strikes. The ARVN claim to have killed 265 VC, while ARVN losses were 54 killed and 15 missing in action. As the 275th Regiment did not usually operate in this area, with the 1st and 3rd Brigades occupied at Lộc Ninh, LTG Weyand ordered two battalions from the 25th Infantry Division to sweep the area around Sông Bé. After two weeks of uneventful patrolling the battalions returned to their parent units. Soon afterwards CIDG forces observed the 271st Regiment moving into the area and PAVN/VC forces building fortifications near the abandoned hamlet of Bu Gia Map, 28 km northeast of Sông Bé.

On 25 November elements of the 275th Regiment attacked the ARVN camp south of Sông Bé in a 4 hour long firefight, resulting in more than 100 VC dead.

On 26 and 28 November CIDG troops from Bo Duc 20 km northwest of Sông Bé observed unidentified PAVN/VC forces moving through the area. Just after midnight on 29 November the 2nd and 3rd Battalions, 272nd Regiment attacked the Bo Duc District headquarters which was defended by a reconnaissance company from the ARVN 5th Division, a company of Regional Forces and two Popular Forces platoons. VC mortar fire prevented the CIDG forces at the Bu Dop Special Forces camp 2 km north of Bo Duc from reinforcing the district headquarters. A group of VC penetrated the southern perimeter of the district headquarters forcing the defenders into the northern half of the compound. The U.S. adviser called in air strikes against VC weapons positions and then, as the VC came closer, napalm and bombs within the compound to halt the VC advance. The ARVN then counterattacked and drove the VC out of the compound. The battle ended at 06:30. VC losses were 96 dead while ARVN losses were 15 dead.

On the afternoon of 29 November Bo Duc was reinforced by the arrival of 2 ARVN infantry battalions, while 1/28th Infantry and Battery A 2nd Battalion, 33rd Artillery Regiment, deployed to Bu Dop establishing a firebase at the northwestern end of the runway. At 22:00 that night, VC mortar rounds and 122-mm rockets hit the firebase. When the barrage lifted, hundreds of VC from the 3rd Battalion, 271st Regiment and elements of the 80A Replacement and Training Regiment advanced from the treeline on the eastern side of the runway. As the VC crossed this 200m distance to the firebase, the 2/33rd Artillery crews depressed their howitzer barrels and fired directly into the advancing VC while the 1/28th Infantry engaged them with all available weapons. Two helicopter gunships soon arrived overhead and they were met by intense antiaircraft fire from more than 10 heavy machine guns. The helicopters spotted the VC mortar positions in a nearby hamlet and engaged these as fighter-bombers came on station. By 00:30 the VC began to disengage leaving 31 dead while U.S. losses were 7 dead.

Over the following week, Allied patrols skirmished with VC forces around Bo Duc and each night mortar shells landed in the town. Anticipating another VC attack on Bo Duc, on 6 December MG Hay deployed the 1/2nd Infantry and Battery B, 1st Battalion, 5th Artillery Regiment, to establish a firebase southeast of Bo Duc. At 01:00 on 8 December, the 3rd Battalion, 273rd Regiment, attacked the firebase under a barrage of Rocket-propelled grenades. The 1/5th Artillery levelled their guns and fired on the advancing VC infantry. As the full weight of U.S. air and artillery support was brought to bear on the VC they began to withdraw at 03:00 leaving 49 dead while U.S. losses were 4 killed.

Between 25 November and 8 December, the PAVN/VC had lost at least 400 men and possibly up to twice that number at Sông Bé, Bo Duc and Bu Dop.

On 5 December a battalion from the 88th Regiment carried out the Đắk Sơn massacre killing more than 200 Montagnards.

=== Highway 13 and Caisson VI ===
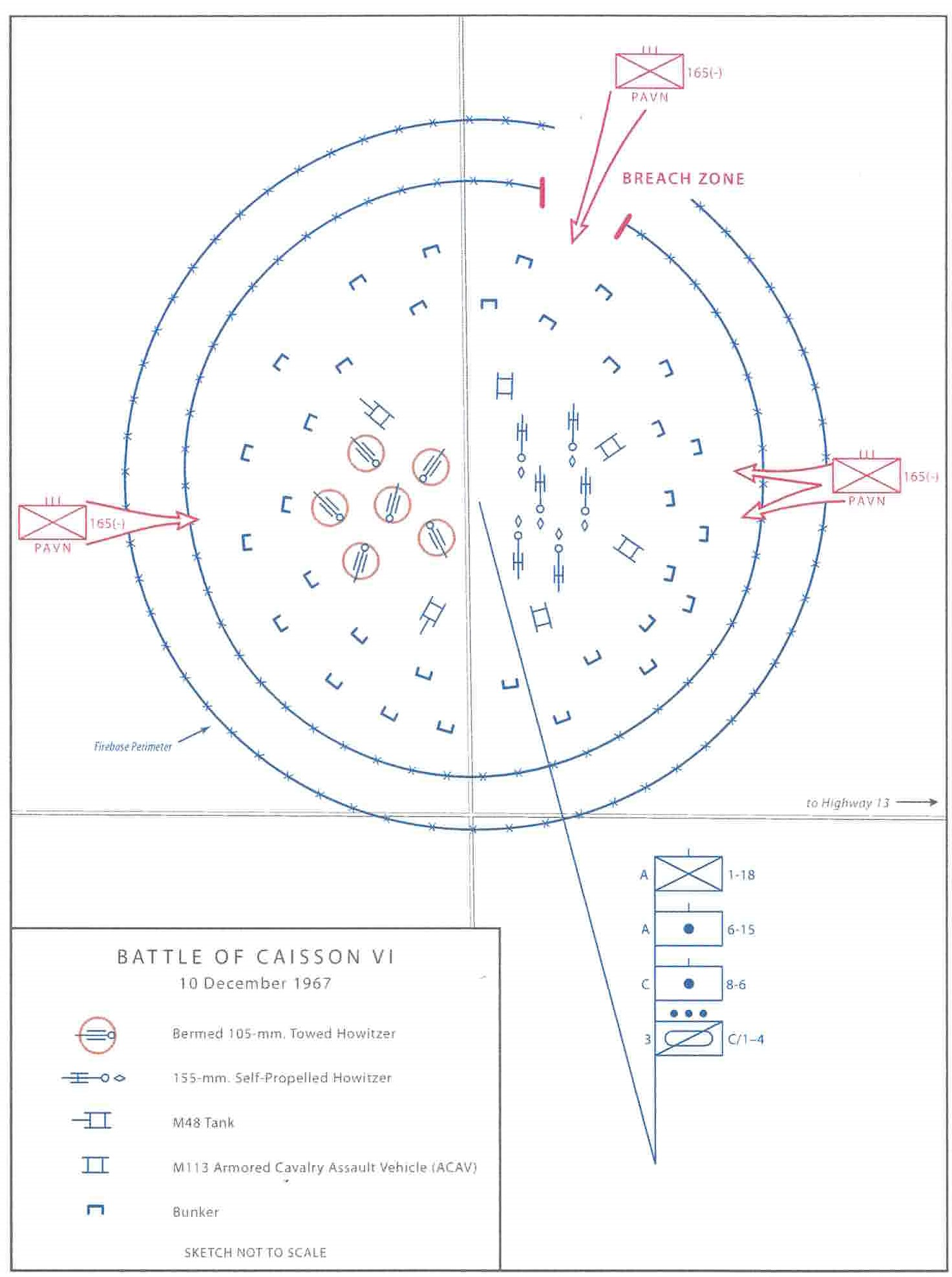
Battle of Caisson VI 10 December 1967

As part of their security operation along Highway 13, the 3rd Brigade, 1st Infantry Division had established a line of firebases named Caisson I through VII at 10 km intervals along the road between Lai Khê and An Lộc from which road security and minesweeping operations would be conducted.

The PAVN 7th Division commanded by Senior Col. Nguyen Hoa sought to close Highway 13 and shortly after midnight on 24 November sent his 2nd Battalion, 165th Regiment to attack a U.S. night defense position on the shoulder of Highway 13 12 km south of An Lộc. The U.S. force consisted of Company B, 1/18th Infantry, a platoon from the 1st Squadron, 4th Cavalry Regiment equipped with 3 M48A3 tanks and 4 M113 armored personnel carriers and two platoons from the 2nd Battalion, 2d Infantry (Mechanized), equipped with 11 M113s. As the attack began, PAVN RPGs failed to disable any of the armored vehicles and sappers were unable to reach the perimeter wire due to the volume of fire coming from the U.S. armored vehicles. When helicopter gunships and an AC-47 arrived overhead the PAVN began to withdraw leaving 57 dead, U.S. losses were 4 dead.

Just after midnight on 3 December, Hoa sent his 1st Battalion, 141st Regiment into action against another night defensive position 3 km south of the 24 November attack. The defending force consisted of Company D, 1/18th Infantry, and a mechanized platoon from Company C, 2/2nd Infantry. This time the PAVN succeeding in penetrating the perimeter before again being forced back by defensive fire, air and artillery strikes. PAVN losses were 27 killed, while U.S. losses were 7 killed.

On 10 December Colonel Hoa targeted Caisson VI (11.59°N 106.6°E) 6 km south of An Lộc. Defending the base was Company A, 1/18th Infantry and Troop A, 1st Squadron, 4th Cavalry with 3 M48A3 tanks and 4 M113s dug into fighting positions around the perimeter. The base also housed Battery A, 6th Battalion, 15th Artillery, equipped with 105-mm howitzers and Battery C, 8th Battalion, 6th Artillery Regiment, equipped with 155-mm howitzers. At 02:00 a barrage of 75-mm recoilless rifles and 82-mm and 120-mm mortars hit the firebase. When this barrage ended VC from the 165th Regiment attacked the north, west and east of the perimeter. Sapper teams penetrated the northern perimeter and VC troops raced for the gap which was soon covered by Canister shot from the M48s. Intensive artillery fire soon forced the PAVN to withdraw and by 03:30 the battle was over. At dawn U.S. soldiers policed the perimeter finding 143 dead, U.S. losses were 1 killed.

== Aftermath ==
The operation concluded on 10 December 1967. The U.S. forces had successfully reopened Highway 13 and claimed to have inflicted serious losses on several PAVN/VC Battalions blunting their offensive plans.
