= Battle of Suoi Bong Trang =

Part of the Vietnam War (1966)

Coordinates: 11°11′00″N 106°41′00″E

- Part of the Vietnam War
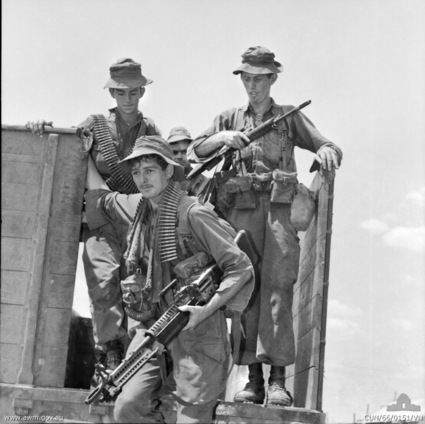
- Australian soldiers returning to Bien Hoa airbase following Operation Rolling Stone, late February 1966.
Date	23–24 February 1966
Location	Tan Binh, central Binh Duong Province, South Vietnam
Result	See Aftermath

Belligerents
United States; Australia; New Zealand	Viet Cong; North Vietnam

Commanders and leaders
(United States) Edgar N. Glotzbach (United States) Y.Y. Phillips (Australia) Alex Preece	

Units involved
(United States) 1st Bde, US 1st Inf Div; 2 platoons of M48 Patton tanks (Australia) 1 RAR (New Zealand) 161 Bty RNZA	J10/761st Regt; 707/763rd Regt; D800 Battalion

Strength
	~2,000

Casualties and losses
Per US/Allies: (United States) 11 killed 72 wounded 1 tank destroyed 2 tanks and four APCs damaged (Australia) 2 wounded Per PAVN/VC claim: About 200 killed	154 killed 200 wounded 15 captured

The Battle of Suoi Bong Trang (23–24 February 1966) was an engagement fought between US, Australian and New Zealand forces, and the Viet Cong and North Vietnamese Army during the Vietnam War. The battle occurred during Operation Rolling Stone, an American security operation to protect engineers building a tactically important road in the vicinity of Tan Binh, in central Binh Duong Province, 30 kilometres (19 mi) north-west of Bien Hoa airbase. During the fighting, soldiers from the US 1st Brigade, 1st Infantry Division and the 1st Battalion, Royal Australian Regiment (1 RAR), which had been attached for the operation, fought off a regimental-sized Viet Cong night assault. Repulsed by massed firepower from artillery and tanks, the Viet Cong suffered heavy casualties and were forced to withdraw by morning. After the attack, the Americans and Australians made no attempt to pursue the Viet Cong, focusing on securing the battlefield and evacuating their own casualties. The Viet Cong continued to harass the American sappers with occasional sniper and mortar fire, but these tactics proved ineffective, and the road was completed by 2 March.

== Background ==
=== Military situation ===
During February 1966, as part of an American road-building program designed to challenge the Viet Cong's ability to manoeuvre in the areas around Saigon, the US 1st Engineer Battalion—under the command of Lieutenant Colonel Howard Sargent—had been engaged in constructing an all-weather road between Route 13 and Route 15 in central Binh Duong Province, west of Ben Cat, on the northern apex of the Viet Cong base area known as the Iron Triangle. This road was planned to cut the communist supply routes between War Zone C, the Mekong Delta, the Iron Triangle and War Zone D, while it would also link the two forward brigades of the US 1st Infantry Division between Phuoc Vinh and Lai Khe and help to extend the authority of the South Vietnamese government.

In response to the American moves, Viet Cong Local Force elements began harassing the sappers, subjecting them daily to sniping, laying mines and carrying out sabotage in an effort to hamper construction. A large American security operation known as Operation Rolling Stone was subsequently launched by elements of US 1st Division on 11 February, in an area of operations approximately 30 kilometres (19 mi) north-west of Bien Hoa airbase. The US 1st Brigade under the command of Colonel Edgar N. Glotzbach was allocated the task, and he assigned one of his three battalions to guard the engineers on a rotating basis, while the other two would probe the Viet Cong positions nearby in order to keep them off balance.

Meanwhile, following a request from the American divisional commander, 1 RAR—under the command of Lieutenant Colonel Alex Preece—was detached from the US 173rd Airborne Brigade and placed under the operational command of the US 1st Division until 5 March. Major General William E. DePuy had selected the Australians specifically because of their reputation for dispersed, aggressive patrolling. Attached to support the infantry from 1 RAR were Australian M113s from 1 APC Troop, engineers from 3 Field Troop, Bell Sioux light observation helicopters and Cessna 180 fixed-wing aircraft from 161st Independent Reconnaissance Flight, and 105-millimetre (4.1 in) L5 Pack Howizters from 161st Battery, Royal New Zealand Artillery.

== Prelude ==
=== Opposing forces ===
Headquarters US 1st Brigade was located about 1,000 metres (1,100 yd) east of the engineer base camp in the vicinity of the hamlet of Tan Binh, just north of the new roadway and less than 5 kilometres (3.1 mi) west of Route 16. The brigade's constituent battalions were widely dispersed carrying out search and destroy operations, and the area of operations was only lightly defended. Nevertheless, except for the harassment faced by the engineers, contact between the Americans and the Viet Cong had been infrequent during the first weeks of the operation. While US and Australian forces possessed only limited details regarding the location of Viet Cong Main Force regiments, Australian intelligence assessed that a minimum of two Local Force platoons, and possibly a Local Force company, were operating in the area but cautioned commanders that the Viet Cong probably had the ability to concentrate a Main Force battalion in the area with little warning. The concept of operations required the Australians to protect the engineer base, the laterite pit and road work parties over a distance of 6,000 metres (6,600 yd), as well as protecting engineer reconnaissance parties when they moved forward to plan new sections of the road.

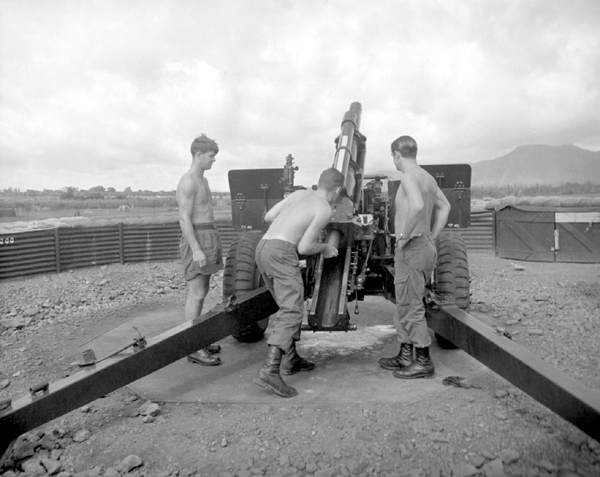
New Zealand gunners in Vietnam.

On 19 February, 1 RAR was inserted by helicopter, taking over from 2nd Battalion, US 38th Infantry Regiment. Preece immediately instituted a program of twenty-four-hour dispersed patrolling, and within two days this had succeeded in reducing the level of Viet Cong activity against the road construction. Two platoons of American M48 Patton tanks were also moved into the area, patrolling by day with the Australian armoured personnel carriers, while securing the laterite pit at night. Several contacts took place and by 22 February the Australians began to suspect that a major attack on them was being planned, noting that they were now facing Main Force elements. In the early morning of 23 February three Viet Cong soldiers were killed in an Australian ambush, while several others were wounded but escaped. The dead soldiers were well equipped with new AK-47 assault rifles and webbing, and they were identified as being from 761st Main Force Regiment. Also captured was a large quantity of ammunition, rations and medical supplies. Later that night a North Vietnamese engineer officer was also killed in a separate ambush, adding further weight to the Australian suspicions. As dawn broke the next day, two half-platoon ambushes from B Company, 1 RAR—under the command of Major Ian McFarlane—engaged two squads of Viet Cong Main Force. Preece immediately warned Glotzbach of an imminent attack, and then informed Sargent that the Australians were moving to set up a defensive position, recommending that the engineers relocate in order to join them.

Meanwhile, to the west three battalions of Viet Cong 9th Division were massing for a decisive blow, preparing a regimental attack on the American and Australian positions. Units included J10 Battalion of the 761st Regiment, 707 Battalion of the 763rd Regiment and D800 Independent Battalion; in total around 2,000 men. By 20:00 they had completed a 25-kilometre (16 mi) approach march and were in assembly areas near the village of Ap Bo, using local women and youths as porters to carry ammunition, equipment and supplies. Small reconnaissance parties moved forward as pathfinders, easily locating the American headquarters due to the large amount of noise and light it gave off. The Viet Cong regimental commander determined to attack on three separate axes from the east, and to then send a force around behind the Brigade Headquarters and assault from the west, thereby surrounding the defenders and preventing them from concentrating their forces in defence. Fire support was provided from two separate locations: with 60-millimetre (2.4 in) mortars deployed to the west, in between the Australians and the US 1st Brigade's headquarters, while 82-millimetre (3.2 in) mortars would fire from a position in Ap Bo to the south-east.

== Battle ==
=== Night assault, 23/24 February 1966 ===
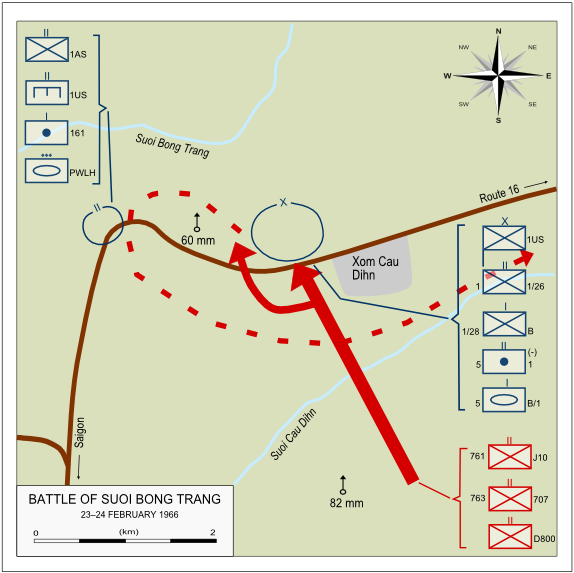
Battle of Suoi Bong Trang, 23–24 February 1966.

By late afternoon on 23 February 1 RAR had adopted a position in all-round defence in the vicinity of the Suoi Bong Trang, a major creek to the west of the US 1st Brigade's headquarters, while the US engineers had moved into a new defensive position inside the Australian perimeter. Meanwhile, alerted by the Australians, a platoon of M48 Patton tanks from Troop B, 1st Squadron, US 4th Cavalry Regiment and a second 105-millimetre (4.1 in) howitzer field battery from 1st Battalion, US 5th Artillery Regiment had been moved in to defend the Brigade Headquarters. 1st Battalion, US 26th Infantry Regiment—under the command of Lieutenant Colonel Y.Y. Phillips—returned from the field and also deployed in defence by last light, augmenting Company B, 1st Battalion, US 28th Infantry Regiment. Additional ammunition was also brought forward, in anticipation of a likely Viet Cong attack.

At 22:00, soldiers from B Company, 1 RAR, occupying the western sector of the Australian perimeter noticed lights 250 metres (270 yd) to their front. McFarlane subsequently requested artillery and mortar fire to target the location, but the request was declined by Preece. Meanwhile, a small Australian standing patrol that had deployed forward of the company main defensive position under the command of Private Walter Brunalli, observed the lights moving closer, east of the US 1st Brigade's headquarters. Two tanks had been positioned forward of the American positions, with a squad of infantry on the eastern approaches, and by midnight they had also reported sounds of movement and intermittent flashes of light through the trees. In the early morning of 24 February, just after midnight, sporadic firing was heard throughout the area. The forward American listening posts had detected small groups of Viet Cong moving outside the perimeter, killing two and forcing the remainder to withdraw into the darkness after one of the sentries opened fire. Glotzbach waited for the Viet Cong main effort, however, and withheld the bulk of the firepower at his disposal.

With their defences alerted, the Americans and Australians "stood to" for the next 45 minutes. The battle began at 01:45 with a heavy barrage of Viet Cong mortar and small arms fire. The Americans responded with small arms, machine-guns, tank fire, mortars and artillery and over the next hour the firing grew in intensity until, at 03:00, the Viet Cong switched their fires to the north-west side of the American perimeter, augmenting their barrage with recoilless rifles. Glotzbach expected a full-scale ground assault, but the Viet Cong had been held back by the weight of American firepower, with heavy artillery including 8-inch (200 mm) and 175-millimetre (6.9 in) howitzers firing in support from Phuoc Vinh, in addition to the defenders' own artillery, which was now firing over open sights after lowering their tubes to fire directly at the Viet Cong positions. In total eight field batteries were available. Elsewhere, the Australian standing patrol had remained in position despite the proximity of the Viet Cong, and with the Americans pouring massive fire into the area they were soon caught in the crossfire. Brunalli was subsequently wounded in the arm.

Although the Australian position was not the focus of the attack, it too soon came under attack from 60-millimetre (2.4 in) mortars, killing an American sapper. With the base plate positioned between the Australians and the US 1st Brigade's headquarters there was initial confusion over the source of the rounds, and both Gloztbach and Preece accused the other of firing on their positions. However, after US aircraft arrived overhead to illuminate the battlefield the Australians were able to join the fighting, and they began firing at masses of Viet Cong who had become disorientated and were milling around on the battlefield. Earlier, a number of Australian ambushes had intercepted Viet Cong pathfinder groups and this had largely prevented the communists from conducting a final reconnaissance of their objectives. Unaware of the newly strengthened defences, they had assaulted into the combined firepower of two American field artillery batteries firing over open sights, as well as tanks supported by infantry. Using anti-personnel canister, flechette and splintex rounds, as well as prepositioned banks of Claymore mines, the Americans broke up several assaults with heavy casualties, while the Australians poured small arms fire into the flank of what was now turning into a costly and futile attack.

=== Viet Cong withdraw, 24 February 1966 ===
By 02:45 three Viet Cong soldiers had moved to within 25 metres (27 yd) of Brunalli's standing patrol, taking up firing positions. The Australians killed one and wounded another who was dragged away by the third, before they withdrew to another location nearby. Meanwhile, the two American tanks forward of the US 1st Brigade's headquarters were overrun and their crews killed. Having suffered heavy losses, by 04:00 some of the Viet Cong began to retreat from the battlefield, and many were now filtering past 1 RAR. As groups of Viet Cong began to move past their position the standing patrol was now in an untenable position, clashing briefly with one group of 15 Viet Cong. McFarlane finally ordered the patrol to withdraw, so that he could engage with artillery and mortars. Moving to achieve a clean break, the patrol engaged another group of 10 Viet Cong with a volley of small arms fire, before withdrawing 30 metres (33 yd) towards the company position in the darkness. Expecting to be followed up the Australians set up a snap ambush, killing another Viet Cong soldier before successfully completing the move back to their perimeter.

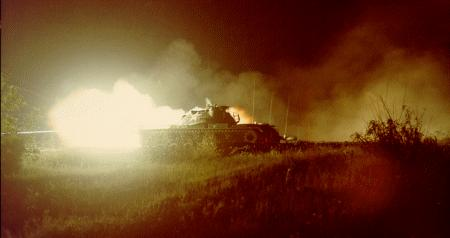
American M48 Patton tank similar to those used at Tan Binh.

With the Viet Cong line of withdrawal carrying them past the Australian position, heavy fire was maintained on them as they attempted a partial retreat, resulting in further casualties. However, as daybreak neared the Viet Cong lingered, unwilling to commit to an all-out attack, but also unwilling to completely withdraw. Finally, the main Viet Cong attack began at 05:30. Earlier losses had been heavy, though, and they were unable to concentrate in sufficient numbers to mount a massed assault. Instead only a series of disjointed attacks followed, none more than 40 men strong. By 06:45 these attacks had been repelled by the Americans and the Viet Cong withdrew before dawn, avoiding the arrival of additional American air support.

== Aftermath ==
=== Casualties ===
At first light the next morning Australian clearing patrols located 89 dead and 11 wounded Viet Cong in front of their positions. The bulk of the casualties had been inflicted by the Americans, but it was later determined that at least 17 Viet Cong had been killed by 1 RAR. Others had been disintegrated by artillery and tank fire and the battlefield was littered with shattered human remains, including severed limbs and chunks of flesh, while red pulp covered the rubber trees that were still standing. Later, 154 bodies were bulldozed into a B-52 bomb crater nearby, while it was estimated that a further 200 Viet Cong casualties had been removed from the battlefield. Fifteen Viet Cong had also been captured during the battle, as had a large quantity of equipment, including small arms and ammunition, crew-served weapons and grenades. The villagers of Ap Bo were again used by the Viet Cong to carry many of the dead and wounded from the battlefield with ox carts, and they also suffered a number of casualties from artillery and mortar fire landing in the area. In contrast, American casualties were limited, consisting of 11 killed and 72 wounded. Australian casualties were lighter still, with just two men wounded. One American tank had also been destroyed, while two tanks and four armoured personnel carriers were damaged. Overall, the commander of the combined US-Australian force believed that they had won an impressive victory, but his troops were exhausted and with ammunition running low, Glotzbach decided not to pursue the withdrawing force. Instead, the Americans and Australians focused on securing the battlefield and evacuating their own casualties.

=== Subsequent operations ===
Australian soldiers examining captured Viet Cong equipment during Operation Rolling Stone.

For the next two days, the Australians continued to provide protection to the US engineers before being replaced by an American infantry battalion. 1 RAR subsequently flew out on 26 February, returning to Bien Hoa airbase. Meanwhile, following the attack at Tan Binh the Viet Cong attempted to avoid further contact, choosing instead to harass the American work parties with occasional mortar and sniper fire. These tactics proved ineffective, and although the Americans lost a further three killed and 29 wounded, the road was completed by 2 March. The Americans then launched an extensive civic action program in an attempt to consolidate their gains, repairing damaged houses, distributing food and providing basic health care to the local population. Despite such efforts though, American commanders were pessimistic about the possibility of achieving any long term gains in Binh Duong Province unless the South Vietnamese Army was able to provide lasting protection for the local population. On 7 March, just five days after the completion of Operation Rolling Stone, the US 1st Brigade was redeployed with US 173rd Airborne Brigade and 1 RAR on Operation Silver City, sweeping the south-west sector of War Zone D.

At the strategic level the ARVN and the South Vietnamese government had both rallied after appearing on the verge of collapse and the threat against Saigon subsided. General William Westmoreland, commander of US forces in Vietnam, planned to adopt a more offensive strategy, and between January and December 1966 US troop levels rose from 210,000 to 327,000. The Australian government also increased its own commitment to the ground war in March 1966, announcing the deployment of a two battalion brigade—the 1st Australian Task Force (1 ATF)—with armour, aviation, engineer and artillery support; in total 4,500 men. Additional Royal Australian Air Force (RAAF) and the Royal Australian Navy (RAN) force elements would also be deployed and with all three services total Australian strength in Vietnam was planned to increase to 6,300 personnel. 1 RAR was subsequently replaced by 1 ATF which was allocated its own area of operations in Phuoc Tuy Province, thereby allowing the Australians to pursue operations more independently using their own counter-insurgency tactics and techniques. The task force arrived between April and June 1966, constructing a base at Nui Dat, while logistic arrangements were provided by the 1st Australian Logistic Support Group which was established at the port of Vung Tau.
