= 9th Division (Vietnam) =

9th Infantry Division
- Active: 1965–present
- Allegiance: Vietnam
- Branch: People's Army of Vietnam
- Type: Infantry
- Size: Division
- Part of: 34th Corps
- Garrison/HQ: Bình Dương Province
- Engagements: Battle of Bình Giã; Battle of Đồng Xoài; Operation Birmingham; Operation Junction City; Tan Son Nhut Air Base; Battle of An Lộc

Commanders
- Notable commanders: Hoàng Cầm; Nguyễn Thế Truyện

The 9th Infantry Division is a division of the People's Army of Vietnam (PAVN), first formed from Viet Cong units in 1965 in the Mekong Delta region.

== Vietnam War ==
In the Battle of Bình Giã from 28 December 1964 to 1 January 1965, future forces of the division lost 32 killed for Army of the Republic of Vietnam (ARVN) losses of 201 killed. In the Battle of Đồng Xoài from June 9 to 13, 1965, they overran the CIDG camp at Đồng Xoài and then ambushed the relief forces killing 416 ARVN and at least 18 U.S. troops while losing 134 killed.

According to the official history of the PAVN, the division was only formed on 2 September 1965 from the 1st (Bình Giã) Regiment, the 2nd (Đồng Xoài) Regiment and the newly formed 3rd Regiment drawn from local forces in the Mekong Delta.

The division was engaged in the Battle of Ap Bau Bang on 12 November 1965, losing 146 killed and 50 probably killed for U.S. losses of 20 killed. The PAVN claimed that the division killed over 2,000 U.S. and destroyed 30 tanks and armored personnel carriers during the operation.

In Operation Mastiff from 21 to 25 February 1966, the U.S. 1st Infantry Division engaged elements of the division in the Dầu Tiếng District killing 61 for the loss of 17 U.S. troops.

In the Battle of Suoi Bong Trang from 23 to 24 February 1966, elements of the division fought units of the U.S. 1st Brigade, 1st Infantry Division and the 1st Battalion, Royal Australian Regiment losing 154 killed and 15 captured for the loss of 11 U.S. troops killed.

In Operation Cocoa Beach from 3 to 8 March 1966, the division's 272nd Regiment was engaged by the 3rd Brigade, 1st Infantry Division on Highway 13 near Lai Khê, losing 199 killed for U.S. losses of 15 killed.

In Operation Birmingham from 24 April to 17 May 1966, U.S./ARVN forces engaged elements of the division in Tây Ninh Province killing over 100.

In Operation El Paso from 19 May to 13 July 1966, U.S. and ARVN forces engaged the division in Bình Long Province killing 825 with a further 1,249 estimated killed for the loss of 125 U.S. troops killed.

The division and the 101st Regiment were the target of Operation Attleboro from 14 September to 25 November 1966, losing 1,016 killed and 200+ missing or captured for the loss of 155 U.S. killed and five missing. The PAVN claimed that they "killed thousands of enemy troops" and forced the U.S. to withdraw.

The division was the target of Operation Junction City from 22 February to 14 May 1967, with the division losing 2,728 killed, 34 captured and 139 defectors. During the operation in the Battle of Prek Klok II the Division's 272nd Regiment lost 197 killed and 5 captured. In the Second battle of Bàu Bàng from 19 to 20 March 1967, two battalions of the division lost 277 killed and three captured for three U.S. killed. The PAVN claim that they eliminated 400 enemy troops and destroyed 63 armored vehicles. In the Battle of Suoi Tre on 21 March 1967, the 272nd Regiment lost 647 killed and seven captured for U.S. losses of 36 killed. The PAVN claimed that they inflicted 1,200 casualties on the U.S. forces, destroyed 72 armored vehicles and 19 artillery pieces and shot down 10 aircraft. In the Battle of Ap Gu from 31 March to 1 April the 271st Regiment lost 609 killed and five captured for U.S. losses of 17 killed. The PAVN claimed that throughout the course of the operation they eliminated 14,000 U.S. troops, destroyed 775 tanks and armored personnel carriers and 112 artillery pieces and shot down 160 aircraft for the loss of 280 of their own soldiers.

In Operation Billings from 12 to 26 June 1967, the Division's 271st Regiment was engaged by the U.S. 1st Infantry Division north of Phước Vĩnh losing 347 killed for U.S. losses of 57 killed.

In Operation Shenandoah II from 29 September to 10 December 1967, the U.S. 1st Infantry Division and ARVN forces engaged the division along Highway 13. Within this operation in the Battle of Ong Thanh on 17 October 1967 the Division's 271st Regiment ambushed the U.S. 2nd Battalion, 28th Infantry Regiment killing 68 U.S. for the loss of 22 killed. In the First Battle of Loc Ninh 29 October - 7 November 1967 the division attacked Lộc Ninh losing 852 killed while killing 50 U.S./ARVN. The PAVN claimed to have eliminated 4,700 enemy including 3,000 Americans.

In Operation Yellowstone from 8 December 1967 to 24 February 1968, the division was engaged by the U.S. 25th Infantry Division. In the attack on Firebase Burt on the night of 31 December 1967, the 271st and 272nd Regiments lost 379 killed and eight captured for U.S. losses of 23 dead.

Elements of the division's 273rd Regiment were engaged by Australian/U.S. forces during Operation Coburg from 24 January to 1 March 1968.

During the Tet Offensive the division's 271st and 272nd Regiments unsuccessfully attempted to interdict roads around Củ Chi Base Camp to prevent movement by U.S. forces. The 273rd Regiment was supposed to attack the town of Thủ Đức but was detected and engaged in the village of An My, losing 343 killed. One battalion of the 273rd Regiment escaped An My and suffered almost 400 killed in the fighting at Thủ Đức. The division also unsuccessfully attacked Tan Son Nhut Air Base on 31 January-1 February 1968, losing more than 669 killed and 26 captured, while killing 22 U.S. and 29 ARVN.

During Operation Quyet Thang from 15 to 17 March 1968, the U.S. 3rd Squadron, 11th Armored Cavalry Regiment and ARVN forces engaged the 272nd Regiment between Đức Hòa and Củ Chi, killing 273.

During the May Offensive of 1968, the division together with the 5th Division attacked west Saigon from 5–12 May losing over 2,600 killed.

During the Phase III Offensive on 18 August 1968, a battalion from the 273rd Regiment, 9th Division, unsuccessfully attacked Firebase Buell II losing 104 dead and 8 captured. The same night, division sappers attacked the U.S. base on Nui Ba Den, killing 8 U.S. troops for the loss of 15 sappers killed.

By 1971, the division was operating in Cambodia and PAVN command formed the Corps-sized Group 301 comprising the division and the 5th and 7th Division, the 28th Artillery Regiment and the 12th Anti-aircraft Machine Gun Battalion.

During Operation Chenla II from 20 August to 3 December 1971, the division defeated units of the Khmer National Army (ANK) who attacked their base areas in eastern Cambodia. The division claimed to have killed or dispersed 10,000 ANK troops and captured 4,700 weapons, 100 radios, 50 trucks and 150 tons of ammunition.

The entire division was involved in the Battle of An Lộc from 13 April to 20 July 1972. As a result of his failure to seize the town quickly, the commander of the 9th Division was officially reprimanded and local command was handed over the senior officer of the PAVN 5th Division. The PAVN history acknowledges that "our units suffered heavy casualties and over half the tanks we used in the battle were destroyed."

In the Battle of Hồng Ngự from March to 4 May 1973, the Division's 272nd Regiment and 2 Regiments from the 6th Division lost 422 killed in their unsuccessful attempt to capture the town of Hồng Ngự. ARVN losses were 94 killed and 36 missing.

A battalion of the Division's 271st Regiment took part in the initial phases of the Battle of Tong Le Chon, starting on 25 March 1973, until replaced by a battalion of the 201st Independent Regiment.

In the Battle of the Iron Triangle from 16 May to 20 November 1974, the Division's 95C Regiment suffering heavy losses in the fighting at An Dien in May/June.

On 20 July 1974, the PAVN formed 4th Corps comprising the division, the 7th Division, the 24th Artillery Regiment, the 71st Anti-aircraft Regiment, the 429th Sapper Regiment and three signal battalions.

From 24 to 31 March 1975, the division made repeated attacks on Chơn Thành Camp, losing at least 18 tanks and 340 killed before the defending Vietnamese Rangers of the 31st Ranger Group successfully evacuated the camp on the night of 31 March/1 April.

In early April, the division was assigned to the 232nd Group which also included the 3rd Division and 5th Division. The division began attacks on ARVN positions on the western approaches to Saigon. On 30 April, the division entered Saigon and captured the headquarters of the ARVN Capital Military District.

== Cambodian–Vietnamese War ==
From 18 to 26 November 1984, some 2,000 troops of the division attacked Khmer People's National Liberation Armed Forces forces in the Nong Chan Refugee Camp, capturing the base after a week of fighting.

== Present day ==
Today the division is part of the 34th Corps (Vietnam People's Army).
