= Pascal Poolaw =

Native American soldier (1922–1967)

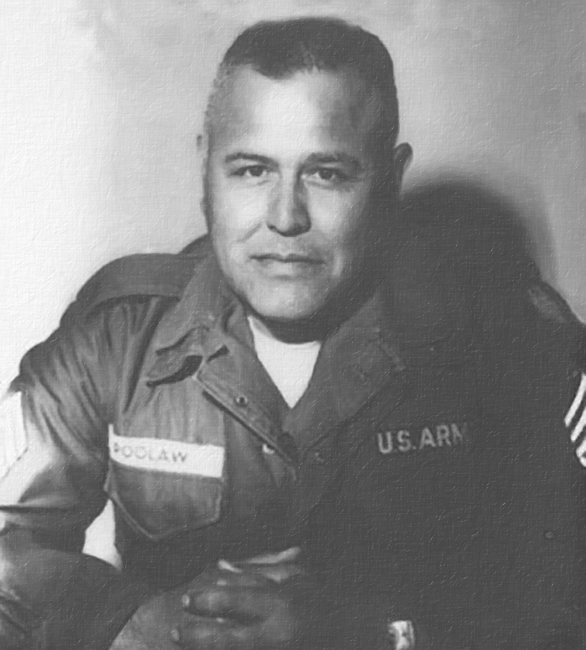
- Poolaw during the Korean War
- Born: Pascal Cleatus Poolaw; January 29, 1922; Apache, Oklahoma, U.S.
- Died: November 7, 1967 (aged 45) near Loc Ninh, South Vietnam
- Burial place: Fort Sill National Cemetery
- Native tribe: Kiowa Nation
- Military career
- Allegiance: United States
- Branch: United States Army
- Years of service: 1942–1962, 1967
- Rank: First Sergeant
- Service number: 18131087
- Regiments: 8th Infantry Regiment; 27th Infantry Regiment; 26th Infantry Regiment
- Wars: World War II; Korean War; Vietnam War (KIA)
- Awards: Distinguished Service Cross; Silver Star Medal (4); Bronze Star Medal (5); Purple Heart Medal (3)

Pascal Cleatus Poolaw (January 29, 1922 – November 7, 1967) was a Kiowa who served with the United States Army in World War II, the Korean War, and the Vietnam War. He is the United States' most decorated Native American, with 42 medals and citations, including the Distinguished Service Cross, four Silver Stars, five Bronze Stars, as well as three Purple Hearts – one for each war.

== Early life ==
Pascal Poolaw was born in Apache, Oklahoma, to Ralph Emerson Poolaw and Minnie Monetathchi Bointy. He married Irene Chalepah on March 15, 1940, and had four sons: Lester, Pascal Jr., Lindy, and Donnie.

== Military career ==
In 1942, Poolaw joined his father and two brothers in World War II. He earned his first Purple Heart when he was wounded in September 1944. He earned his first Silver Star for his actions near Recogne, Belgium, while serving in Company M, 8th Infantry Regiment, when he pushed his unit forward under heavy fire and hurled hand grenades at enemy machine guns until the enemy dispersed.

He continued to serve in the Korean War, where he earned two more Silver Stars, and in July 1950, another Purple Heart, before his return to the United States in 1952. He retired from the Army in 1962.

Poolaw's son, Pascal Jr., had also joined the army and was serving in the Vietnam War in February 1967, when he was wounded in both legs by a landmine, and had to have his right leg amputated below the knee. Poolaw's youngest son Lindy was also drafted and set to deploy to Vietnam shortly thereafter.

Poolaw rejoined the Army to prevent Lindy from having to serve, by taking his place. Lindy had already shipped out and Poolaw had hoped to catch up with him in time, but when he arrived on the West Coast, he discovered his son had already left the day before. He decided to follow his son to Vietnam.

Poolaw was deployed on May 31, 1967, as the first sergeant of the 26th Infantry Regiment's C Company. On November 7, while on a search and destroy mission during the first battle of Loc Ninh, Poolaw and his unit were ambushed by the Viet Cong. He was killed while attempting to pull a unit casualty to safety, and posthumously awarded a fourth Silver Star.

== Legacy ==
At his funeral his wife stated: "He has followed the trail of the great chiefs." A building at the U.S. Army base in Fort Sill in Lawton, Oklahoma—where he was stationed prior to his deployment to Vietnam—is named in his honor.

== Awards and decorations ==
Poolaw was the recipient of the following military decorations and service medals:

== Footnotes ==
=== Sources ===
- Meadows, W. (2012). Kiowa Military Societies: Ethnohistory and Ritual. Norman: University of Oklahoma Press. ISBN 9780806186023.
- "Pascal Cleatus Poolaw". Military Times. The Hall of Valor Project. Sightline Media Group. March 12, 2010.
- "Poolaw, Pascal Cleatus, Sr., 1SG". Together We Served. Military Timeline. December 21, 2010.
- Struzinski, F. (2012). "The Soldiers of Srok Rung" (PDF). Bridgehead Sentinel. Trenton: Society of the First Infantry Division. OCLC 11274165. Archived from the original (PDF) on December 15, 2018.
- Ward, G.; Burns, K. (2017). The Vietnam War: An Intimate History. New York: Doubleday. ISBN 9781524733100.
