= Operation Birmingham =

1966 Vietnam War military operation

- Part of the Vietnam War
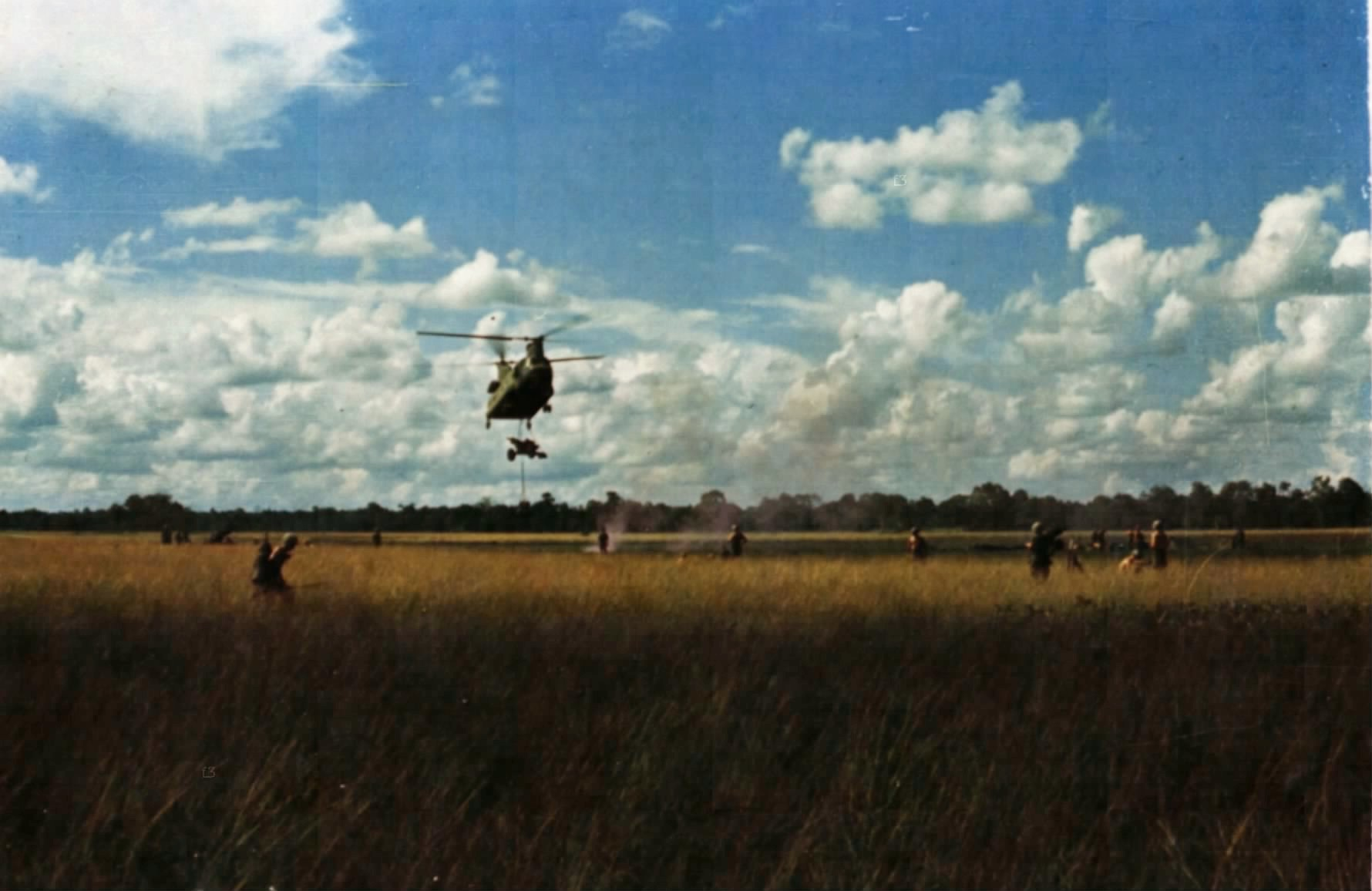
- CH-47 lands a 105mm howitzer
Date	24 April – 17 May 1966
Location	Tây Ninh Province, South Vietnam
Result	U.S.-South Vietnamese tactical victory

Belligerents
United States	Viet Cong

Commanders and leaders
LTG Jonathan O. Seaman; MG William E. DePuy	GEN Nguyễn Chí Thanh; COL Hoàng Cầm

Units involved
1st Infantry Division: 1st Brigade; 2nd Brigade; 3rd Brigade	9th Infantry Division: 271st Regiment; 272nd Regiment; 273rd Regiment

Casualties and losses
56 killed	119 killed and 28 captured

Operation Birmingham was a military operation of the Vietnam War in War Zone C, north of Saigon conducted by the U.S. Army 1st Infantry Division against the Viet Cong (VC) 9th Infantry Division from 24 April to 17 May 1966.

== Background ==
After the arrival of the American divisions in 1965 and early 1966, the communists also strengthened their force in B2 Front under the command of General Nguyễn Chí Thanh with the premier 9th Division in the north, the 5th Division in the east of Saigon, the 7th Division recently infiltrating from North Vietnam beside the elite 70th Guard Regiment and the U80 Artillery Regiment.

To counter the VC potential assaults in III Corps territory in the summer, the II Field Force commander, General Jonathan O. Seaman launched the 1st Division of General William E. DePuy on a preemptive campaign. A series of operations were carried out on Phước Tuy province, May Tao Secret Zone and Rung Sat Special Zone, southeast of Saigon, before DePuy turned his attention to Tây Ninh Province and War Zone C, northwest of Saigon to search and destroy the COSVN headquarters as well as the VC 9th Division's units.

== Operation ==
Seven battalions of the 1st Division were moved to the area of operation (AO) in Phase I of the operation. Following 15 immediate and 45 pre-planned B-52 sorties struck the objective areas to secure landing zones, an infantry battalion and an artillery battery of the 3rd Brigade airlifted by helicopters into the AO on 24 April. Shortly afterward, the remainder of the 3rd, the whole 2nd Brigade, and two infantry battalions of the 1st Brigade arrived by fixed-wing C-130s. The following day, another four immediate and 42 pre-planned strikes were flown. On average, 315 tons of bombs were dropped per day during 24–26 April. Therefore, there were just a few light contacts in this phase.

Security for attached artillery/engineer units, and support for CIDG search-destroy forces was provided by elements of the 1st Squadron, 4th Cavalry

Phase II of the operation began on 27 April with eight significant contacts initiated by U.S. forces in the day. A battalion of the 1st Brigade discovered and captured several tons of supplies, while a battalion of the 3rd Brigade found and destroyed a battalion-size VC base camp and several way stations. On the 27th, US losses were one killed and 24 wounded, while VC losses were seven killed.

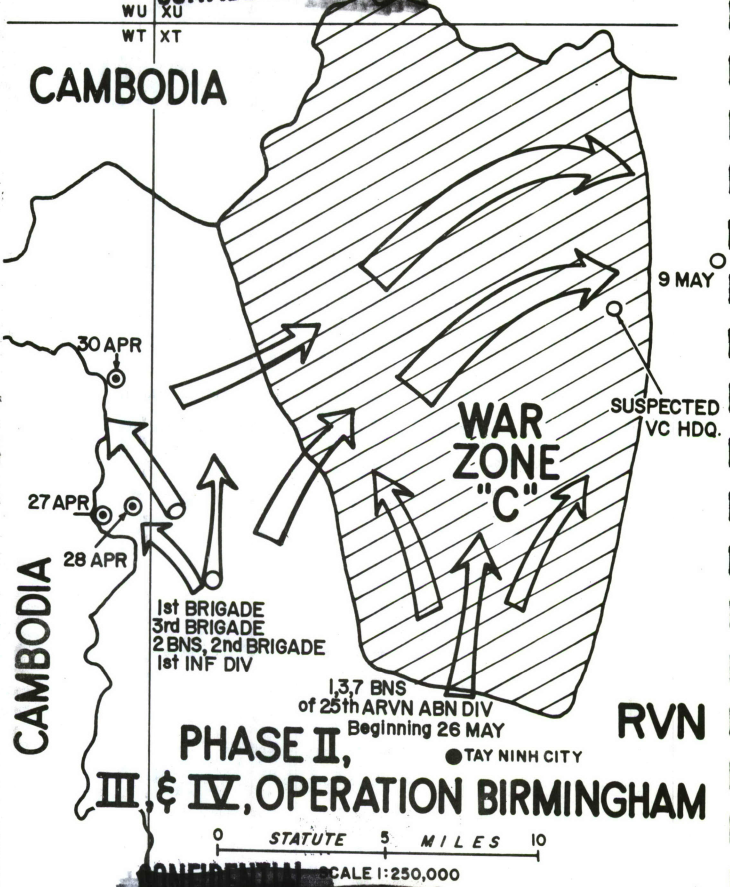
CHECO Report - Operation Birmingham 1966

On 30 April two battalions of the 1st Brigade swept north along the east bank of the Cái Bát river on the border between South Vietnam and Cambodia attracting fire from both across the river in Cambodia and from the Vietnamese hamlet of Lò Gò. The 1st Battalion, 2nd Infantry Regiment engaged the forces firing from Cambodia while the 2nd Battalion, 16th Infantry Regiment engaged the VC in Lò Gò. The fighting at Lò Gò continued into the afternoon when the VC, latter identified as coming from the C230 Battalion (possibly belonging to the 70th Guard Regiment) withdrew leaving 54 dead. US losses were six killed and nine wounded.

On 28 April, an APC and a tank of the 1/4 Cavalry were damaged by two mine accidents.

Phase II of Birmingham Operation was completed on 30 April. Phase III and IV, which followed, continuing for another two weeks as the 1st Infantry Division swept War Zone C in the hope of finding COSVN headquarters which was believed to located in northern Tây Ninh Province. The heaviest fighting of the operation occurred on 2 May, when a US company ran into fire from a large VC force near the hamlet of Lò Gò. 72 pre-planned and six immediate tactical air strikes were called in against VC automatic weapon positions. In the ensuing battle, 42 VC were killed but no US loss was reported.

Contact continued light till 16:00 on 9 May when a maneuver US battalion encountered an estimated VC battalion. Tactical Air Control Center (TACC) placed sixteen sorties on the VC battalion, perhaps the most impressive air action of the operation but no VC loss was confirmed. Also on 9 May, twelve B-52s dropped CBU munitions for the first time in support of the 1st Infantry Division. For the remainder of the operation, there was only light contact with VC forces and TACC sorties averaged only about 30 a day. However, on 12 May, strike planes inadvertently dropped ordnance on 1st Division troops, killing two and wounding 58 US soldiers.

The operation also employed two brigades of the Vietnamese Mobile Guerrilla Forces (MGFs) whose primary objective was to locate and engage VC forces as well as to destroy their base camps along the Cambodian border. These brigades moved rapidly to exploit recently acquired intelligence on enemy installations and movements and were frequently transported by helicopter to locations throughout Tây Ninh Province. The MGFs utilized guerrilla warfare tactics that were often employed by the VC against U.S. and ARVN units.

== Aftermath ==
When Operation Birmingham terminated on 17 May, a total of 1,280 tactical sorties had been flown in support, dropping 1,040 tons of bombs. In addition, 162 B-52 flying in support dropped 3,118 tons of iron bombs and CBU. This was the heaviest air support ever provided a single ground operation of this duration. The VC lost 119 confirmed killed and 28 captured. The US and friendly forces losses were 56 killed and 324 wounded. A large amount of VC stores and facilities were captured or destroyed. 21 US helicopters and 10 US armored vehicles were destroyed also.
