= Operation Yellowstone (Vietnam War) =

Part of the Vietnam War (1967–1968)

- Part of the Vietnam War
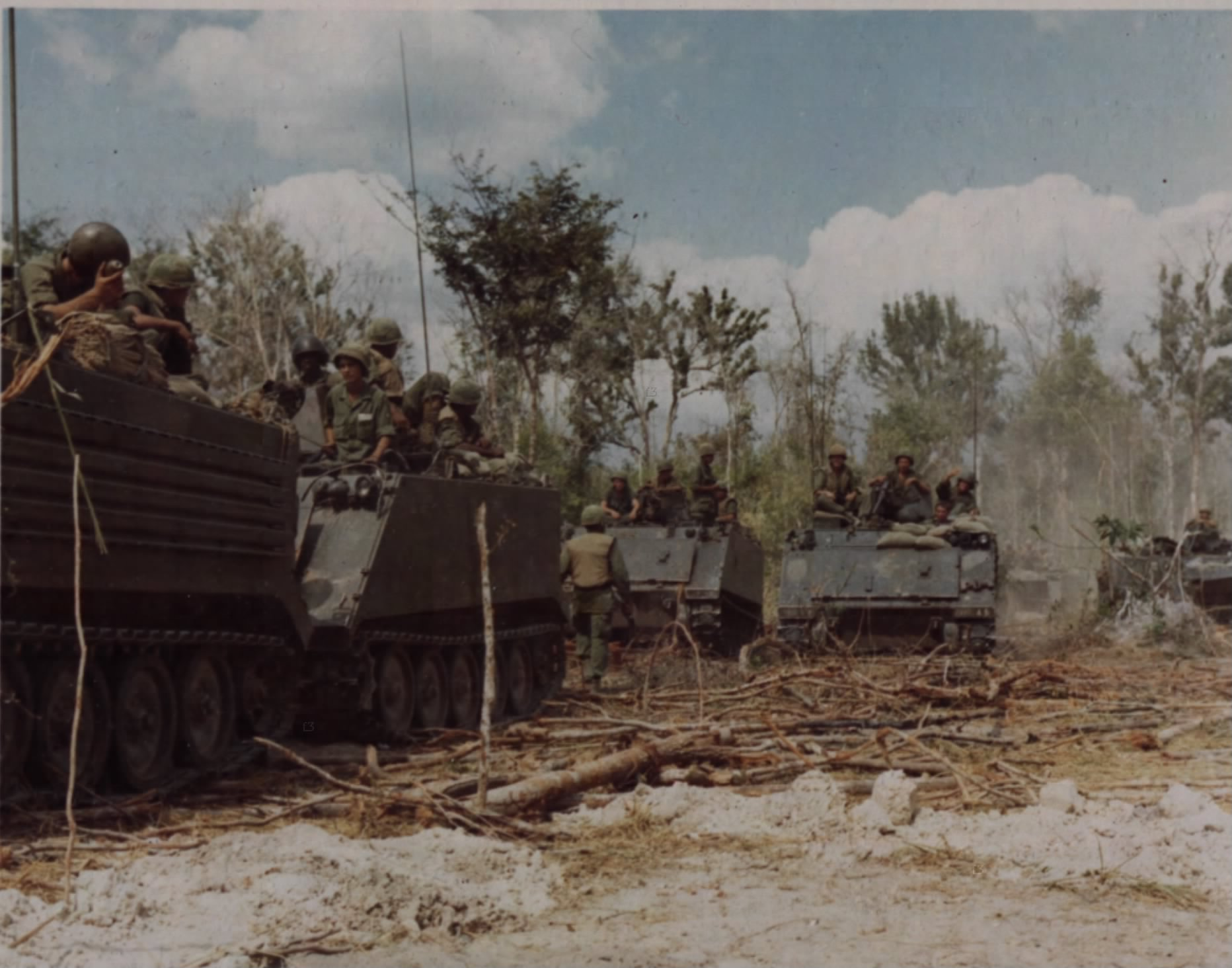
- M113s from Company "A", 3rd Battalion, 22nd Infantry (Mechanized), 18 January 1968
| Date | 8 December 1967 – 24 February 1968 |
| Location | Tây Ninh Province, South Vietnam |
| Result | U.S. operational success |

Belligerents
| United States | North Vietnam; Viet Cong |

Commanders and leaders
| Fillmore K. Mearns | |

Units involved
| 25th Infantry Division: 1st Brigade; 3rd Brigade | 7th Division; 9th Division |

Casualties and losses
| 81 killed | U.S. body count: 1,254 killed 146 individual and 68 crew-served weapons recovered |

Operation Yellowstone was an operation conducted by the 1st and 3rd Brigades, 25th Infantry Division in northeast Tây Ninh Province, lasting from 8 December 1967 to 24 February 1968.

== Background ==
Northern Tây Ninh Province contained the largest People's Army of Vietnam (PAVN) and Viet Cong (VC) base areas in III Corps, providing easy access to bases in Cambodia and Saigon and other cities in the Mekong Delta. U.S. and Army of the Republic of Vietnam (ARVN) forces had not threatened the PAVN/VC in the area since Operation Junction City concluded in May 1967, but with the rainy season coming to an end the 1st and 3rd Brigades of the 25th Infantry Division reinforced by a tank battalion and an air cavalry squadron would take advantage of the improved weather to sweep the area and help build two new Special Forces camps.

== Operation ==
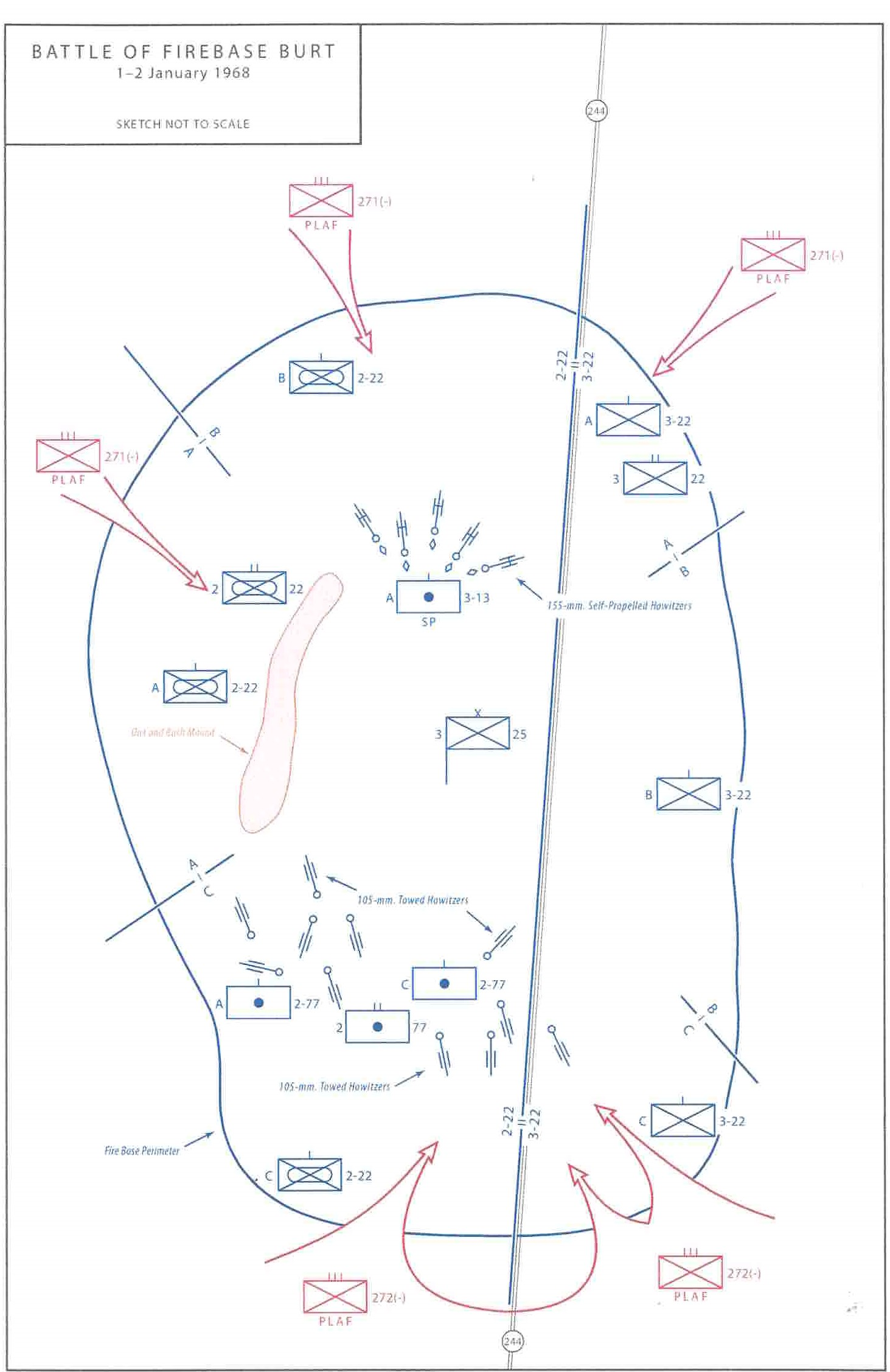
Battle of Firebase Burt, 1–2 January 1968

Operation Yellowstone commenced on 8 December with two infantry battalions from the 1st Brigade landing by helicopter unopposed at the hamlet of Katum on Highway 4. When the two battalions finished securing the area, a task force consisting of tanks, artillery and engineers moved along Highway 4 from Tây Ninh Combat Base and began building Firebase Custer (11.663°N 106.222°E), which would serve as the 1st Brigade's forward base and Firebase Beauregard (11.626°N 106.266°E) 5 km southeast on Route 246 near the village of Bo Tuc.

The 3rd Brigade based at Dầu Tiếng Base Camp together with 2 ARVN infantry battalions also moved into the area locating numerous supply caches but few PAVN/VC.

At 02:00 on 15 December, PAVN mortar fire began hitting the 4th Battalion, 9th Infantry positions at Firebase Beauregard and then several hundred PAVN from the 7th Division attacked the base. Sappers penetrated the perimeter and placed satchel charges in the ammunition dump, setting off six hundred 105-mm. shells. The PAVN left behind 40 dead, while U.S. losses were 6 dead.

COSVN strengthened their defenses by placing two regiments of the 9th Division along the border between the Fishhook region and War Zone C, while MG Mearns moved the 3rd Brigade into the northeastern part of War Zone C. By 29 December, the 3rd Brigade had established Firebase Burt (11.581°N 106.372°E) on Route 246, 12 km southeast of Firebase Beauregard. Firebase Burt measured 1 km from east to west and 500m from north to south, with a road running vertically through the middle. The command post and supply area was located at the center of the base. The 3rd Battalion, 22nd Infantry Regiment occupied 40 bunkers on the eastern half of the perimeter while the 2nd Battalion, 22nd Infantry Regiment, placed their M113 armored personnel carriers in Hull-down positions along the western perimeter. Fire support was provided by Batteries A and C, 2nd Battalion, 77th Artillery Regiment, placed their eleven 105-mm. howitzers in the south, five 155-mm. self-propelled howitzers of Battery A, 3rd Battalion, 13th Artillery Regiment in the north, a pair of M42 Dusters from Battery B, 5th Battalion, 2nd Artillery Regiment and a pair of quad mounted M55 .50-caliber machine-guns from Battery D, 71st Artillery Regiment.

On the evening of 31 December while a 24-hour New Year's truce was in effect, the 271st and the 272nd Regiments of the PAVN 9th Division moved into attack positions around Firebase Burt. At midnight on 1 January 1968 under cover of a mortar barrage the PAVN began a simultaneous attack on the northern and southern ends of the base. The defenders detonated the perimeter Claymore mines and responded with small arms and Canister shot. PAVN rocket-propelled grenades knocked out an M113 and an M42 and at 02:30, a squad of sappers breached the south perimeter razor wire. The 2/77th artillerymen lowered their 105-mm. howitzers and fired directly into the PAVN with beehive rounds forcing them to withdraw. The PAVN disengaged shortly before dawn on 1 January. 379 PAVN were killed and 8 wounded were captured, while U.S. losses were 23 dead.

== Aftermath ==
Operation Yellowstone officially concluded on 24 February 1968, PAVN/VC losses were 1,254 killed and 146 individual and 68 crew-served weapons captured; U.S. losses were 81 killed.
