= 71st Air Defense Artillery Regiment =

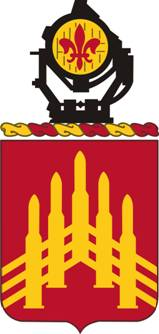
- Coat of arms
- Active: 1918-82
- Country: (United States) USA
- Branch: United States Army
- Type: Air defense artillery
- Role: Anti-aircraft warfare
- Size: Regiment
- Motto: "Unidique Venimus" (We Come From All Parts)
- Equipment: BL 8-inch howitzer Mk VI – VIII; 37mm Gun M1; 120 mm M1 gun MIM-23 Hawk; MIM-14 Nike-Hercules; M55 .50-caliber machine gun: M45 Quadmount
- Decorations: Valorous Unit Award; Meritorious Unit Commendation with Oak Leaf Cluster; Air and Space Outstanding Unit Award

Commanders
- Notable commanders: Edward W. Timberlake

Insignia
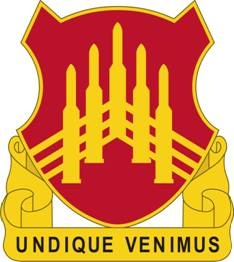
- Distinctive unit insignia

The 71st Air Defense Artillery was a regiment in the United States Army.

== Lineage/history ==
=== World War I ===
Constituted 2 May 1918 in the Regular Army as the 71st Artillery, United States Army Coast Artillery Corps with Colonel Frank S. Long commanding.
Organized 12 May 1918 in the Coast Defenses of Boston (Massachusetts) with headquarters at Fort Strong, Massachusetts.

The regiment sailed via Halifax, Nova Scotia, to England then crossed the English Channel to Le Havre, France then on to an Organization and Training Center in the vicinity of Angers, France in 1918 when the Armistice with Germany ending World War I was signed.

Returned to the continental US and demobilized 6 March 1919 at Camp Devens, Massachusetts (now Fort Devens).

=== World War II ===
The 71st Artillery, Coast Artillery Corps, reconstituted and consolidated with the 71st Coast Artillery (Antiaircraft) Regiment at Fort Monroe, Virginia, on July 1, 1940, using officers of the 504th Coast Artillery (Antiaircraft) Regiment, Organized Reserve, a 65-man cadre from the 52nd Coast Artillery in Harbor Defense Sandy Hook, and a similar group from 70th Coast Artillery (Anti Aircraft) Regiment at Fort Moultrie and Fort Screven (see Tybee Island, Georgia).
The 1st Battalion activated on July 31, 1940, and the 2nd Battalion on Jan. 3, 1941 at Fort Story, Virginia (now Joint Expeditionary Base East).
Regiment moved to anti-aircraft positions in the vicinity of Norfolk, VA, December 8, 1941, to January 7, 1942, when the regiment moved to the Washington, D.C., area, to establish anti-aircraft defenses. The 3rd Bn was activated June 15, 1942.
The regiment remained posted at Washington until inactivated September 1, 1943. Its elements reorganized and redesignated as follows: Headquarters Battery, 71st Antiaircraft Artillery Group; 1st Battalion as the 71st Antiaircraft Artillery Automatic Weapons Battalion; 3rd Battalion as the 241st Antiaircraft Artillery Searchlight Battalion.
The 2nd Battalion (HAWK), 71st Artillery was activated 1 March 1960 at Fort Bliss, Texas and later stationed in Korea. 2nd Battalion redesignated 1 Sept 1971 as the 2nd Battalion, 71st Air Defense Artillery.

=== Cold War ===
Headquarters and Headquarters Battery, 71st Antiaircraft Artillery Group, inactivated 25 March 1946 at Munich, Germany.
Redesignated 15 September 1949 as Headquarters and Headquarters Battery, 71st Antiaircraft Artillery Gun Battalion.
Activated 30 September 1949 at Fort Bliss, Texas, with organic batteries of the former 71st Antiaircraft Artillery Gun Battalion.
Redesignated 22 July 1953 as the 71st Antiaircraft Artillery Missile Battalion.
Inactivated 1 September 1958 in the Washington (DC)-Baltimore (MD) Defense Area.
Reorganized and redesignated 28 August 1958 as Headquarters and Headquarters Battery, 2d Missile Battalion, 71st Artillery (organic elements concurrently constituted and activated).
Moved by train and ship from Ft. Bliss, TX to Taiwan and activated as an operational Nike-Hercules battalion October 26, 1958.
Battalion inactivated 15 August 1959 in Taiwan. Inactivated 20 July 1982 in Korea.

=== Vietnam War ===
Battery D, 71st Artillery (.50-caliber machine-gun) 29 September 1966 to 25 June 1971

"Battery D of the 71st Artillery was a quad mounted M55 .50-calibermachine-gun battery stationed on its first tour in Vietnam at Long Binh with the 5th Battalion, 2nd Artillery and later II Field Force, Vietnam. On its second tour in Vietnam the battery was attached to XXIV Corps stationed at Da Nang."

6th Battalion, 71st Artillery (HAWK Missile) 29 September 1965 to 22 September 1968

"The 6th Battalion of the 71st Artillery was a mobile HAWK missile battalion located first at Qui Nhon. In 1966, as part of the 97th Artillery Group, the battalion was relocated to Cam Ranh Bay, where it remained until departing Vietnam."

== Organic elements ==
- 1st Missile Battalion, 71st Artillery
- 2nd Battalion, 71st Air Defense Artillery (1971–82)(South Korea); formerly 2nd Missile Battalion, 71st Artillery (1958–59, 1960–66)
- 3rd Battalion, 71st Artillery
- 6th Battalion, 71st Artillery
- Battery D, 71st Artillery
- 16th Detachment, 71st Air Defense Artillery

== Distinctive unit insignia ==
- Description

A Gold color metal and enamel device 1 1/8 inches (2.9 cm) in height overall blazoned as follows: Gules, five high explosive projectiles palewise in chevron surmounted by three chevronels Or. Attached below and to the sides of the insignia a Gold scroll inscribed "UNDIQUE VENIMUS" in Black letters.

- Symbolism

Scarlet and yellow are the colors used for Artillery. The three chevronels from the coat of arms of John Winthrop, the founder of the Boston Colony, alludes to Boston, the area in which the unit was originally constituted and organized in 1918. The five projectiles are symbolic of the unit's five battle honors awarded for service in World War II. They also commemorate the mission of the unit to attack and destroy enemy aircraft. The motto translates to "We Come From All Parts".

- Background

The distinctive unit insignia was originally approved for the 71st Artillery Regiment on 21 May 1959. It was redesignated for the 71st Air Defense Artillery Regiment effective 1 September 1971.

== Coat of arms ==
- Blazon
  - Shield- Gules, five high explosive projectiles palewise in chevron surmounted by three chevronels Or.
  - Crest- On a wreath of the colors Or and Gules a fixed searchlight Sable, glass Or charged with a fleur-de-lis Gules.
  - Motto- UNIDIQUE VENIMUS (We Come From All Parts).
- Symbolism
  - Shield- Scarlet and yellow are the colors used for Artillery. The three chevronels from the coat of arms of John Winthrop, the founder of the Boston Colony, alludes to Boston, the area in which the unit was originally constituted and organized in 1918. The five projectiles are symbolic of the unit's five battle honors awarded for service in World War II. They also commemorate the mission of the unit to attack and destroy enemy aircraft.
  - Crest- The fixed searchlight used in seacoast defense refers to the former mission of the regiment as coast artillery. The fleur-de-lis is for service in World War I.
- Background- The coat of arms was originally approved for the 71st Artillery Regiment on 21 May 1959. It was redesignated for the 71st Air Defense Artillery Regiment effective 1 September 1971.

== Campaign streamers ==
World War I: Streamer without inscription
World War II: Normandy, Northern France, Rhineland, Ardennes-Alsace, Central Europe

== Decorations ==
Air Force Outstanding Unit Award

- Valorous Unit Award
- Meritorious Unit Commendation, with second award
- Air Force Outstanding Unit Award, Streamer embroidered KOREA 1978-1982 (2nd Battalion, 71st Air Defense Artillery)

== See also ==
- Air Defense Artillery Branch
- 38th Air Defense Artillery Brigade (United States)
- U.S. Army Combat Arms Regimental System
- United States Army air defense
