= War Zone C =

Area in South Vietnam

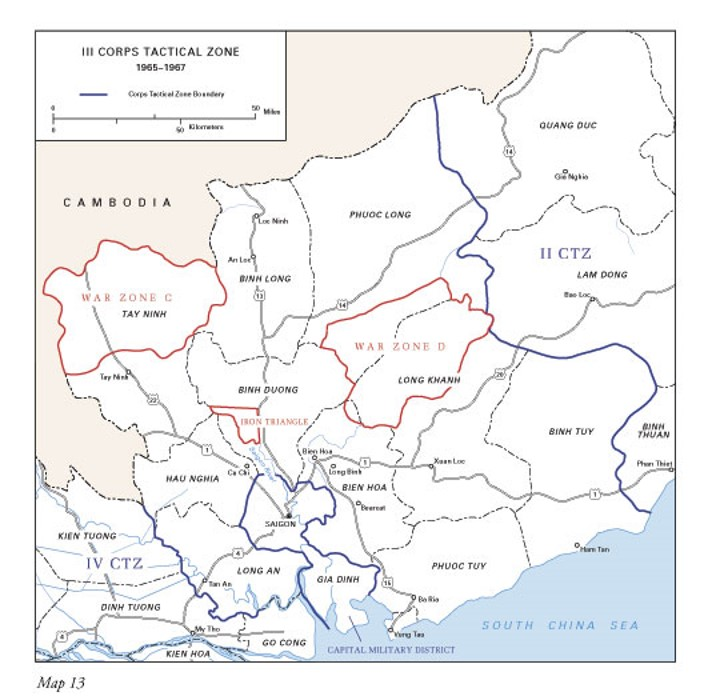
Map of III Corps including War Zone C

War Zone C was the area in South Vietnam centered around the abandoned town of Katum near the Cambodian border where there was a strong concentration of People's Army of Vietnam (PAVN) and Viet Cong (VC) activity during the Vietnam War. This area was reportedly the general location of COSVN, the headquarters for communist military and political activities in the southern half of Vietnam.

== Geography ==
War Zone C, located in the area designated as III Corps, was a section of South Vietnam with high strategic value due to its location in between Cambodia and Saigon as well as the fact that it was a popular jump off spot for PAVN/VC forces and supplies from the Ho Chi Minh Trail. War Zone C's boundaries followed the Cambodian border to the north and west, while its eastern boundary ran parallel to Highway 13. The area included portions of Tay Ninh province, Binh Long province, and Binh Duong province. The area has been described as pathless jungles through mountainous regions and boggy swamps which made travel and transportation extremely difficult.

== Actions ==
The overall strategy that was adhered to focused on disrupting and reducing bases from which PAVN/VC forces could operate from and threaten Saigon. U.S. and Army of the Republic of Vietnam forces conducted small unit operations in this area, often re-sweeping previously explored areas, and established a more effective defense along the Cambodian border to prevent VC and PAVN troops from regaining access to bases in the southern provinces. War Zone C played host to several American combat operations throughout the war including Operation Attleboro, Operation Birmingham, and Operation Junction City (one of the largest operations conducted during the Vietnam War). Many of the battles in III Corps did not develop due to direct assaults into the wilderness, yet instead occurred in a multitude of small, sporadic fire fights located miles apart.
