= United States Army air defense =

Air defense of the United States

United States Army air defense relies on a range of ground launched missiles, ranging from hand held to vehicle mounted systems. The Air Defense Artillery is the branch that specializes in anti-aircraft weapons (such as surface-to-air missiles). In the US Army, these groups are composed of mainly air defense systems such as the Patriot Missile System, Terminal High Altitude Air Defense, and the Avenger Air Defense system which fires the FIM-92 Stinger missile.

The Air Defense Artillery branch descended from the Anti-Aircraft Artillery (part of the Field Artillery) into a separate branch on 20 June 1968.

== History ==
During World War II, US Army anti-aircraft systems were quite competent. Their smaller tactical needs were filled with four M2 (.50 BMG|.50 caliber) machine guns linked together (known as the "Quad Fifty"), which were often mounted on the back of a half-track to form the Half Track, M16 GMC, Anti-Aircraft. Although of even less power than Germany's 20 mm systems, they were at least widely available. They were also used to help suppress ground targets. Their larger 90 mm M2 gun would prove, as did the eighty-eight, to make an excellent anti-tank gun as well, and was widely used late in the war in this role. Also, available to the Americans at the start of the war was the 120 mm M1 gun stratosphere gun, which was the most powerful AA gun with an impressive 60,000 ft (~18 km) altitude capability. The 90 mm and 120 mm guns were used into the 1950s.

=== Self-propelled anti-aircraft weapons ===
During the course of the Korean War, the U.S. Army decided to phase out all vehicles based on the M24 Chaffee chassis, such as the M19 Multiple Gun Motor Carriage with 2x 40mm Anti-Aircraft guns, in favor of designs that utilized the chassis of the M41. Since the 40mm guns were still seen as an effective anti-aircraft weapon, they became the basis of the Duster.

The first effective self-propelled anti-aircraft weapon (SPAAG) in U.S. Army service was the all-manual M42 Duster. While relatively capable for the era it was designed in, by the time it reached widespread service in the late 1950s, it was clear that it was ineffective against high-speed jet-powered targets. The Duster was completely removed from service by 1963, only to be re-introduced briefly during the Vietnam War when its replacement never arrived.

The first proposed replacement for the Duster was the Sperry Vigilante, which referred to the six-barreled 37 mm Gatling gun proposed as the basis for a new SPAAG. Although the gun was extremely powerful, at some point in the late 1950s the Army decided that all gun-based systems were out of date.

The next proposed replacement for the Duster was the ambitious MIM-46 Mauler. Mauler mounted a nine-missile magazine on top of an adapted M113 Armored Personnel Carrier chassis, along with detection and tracking radars. Mauler featured a completely automatic fire control system, with the operators simply selecting targets and pressing "OK". It would be able to respond to low-flying high-speed targets at any angle out to a range of about five miles. However, Mauler proved to be beyond the state-of-the-art and ran into intractable problems during development. Realizing it was not going to enter service any time soon, it was downgraded to a technology demonstration program in 1963, and eventually cancelled outright in 1965.

Still lacking an effective anti-aircraft system, the Army started development of two stop-gap systems that were meant to operate in concert. The M163 VADS combined the M61 Vulcan cannon, the M113 chassis, and an all-optical fire control system with a simple lead-computing gunsight. Suitable for "snap shots" against nearby targets, the VADS system was equipped only with a small ranging radar for the gunsight, its firing range being too small to justify a larger tracking radar. VADS was intended to operate in concert with the MIM-72 Chaparral, which combined the AIM-9 Sidewinder missile with a modified version of the M548 Cargo Carrier chassis. The Chaparral's AIM-9D missiles were capable of tail-chase launches only, but offered ranges up to 5 miles. Also using an all-optical firing system, the Chaparral nevertheless required the operator to "settle" the missiles on the target for a period of time to allow them to lock on, limiting its ability to deal with quickly moving targets. Both vehicles were optionally supported by the AN/MPQ-49 Forward Area Alerting Radar (FAAR), but this system was towed by the Gama Goat and couldn't be used near the front lines. The pair of weapons was, at best, a nuisance to the enemy and had limited performance against modern aircraft.

Eventually, the M48 and M163 were both replaced in US service by the M1097 Avenger and the M6 Linebacker (M2 Bradley with FIM-92 Stinger missiles instead of the standard TOW anti-tank missiles).

At one point, the Army started to become concerned about developments in sensor technologies that would allow attacks by fixed-wing aircraft at night or in bad weather. They developed a requirement for a weapon system able to operate using FLIR and a laser rangefinder in order to counter these threats. However, the rest of the military establishment pooh-poohed the idea; even the US Air Force carried out only limited operations in bad weather, and the Soviets had a considerably less capable force in this regard. The idea gained little traction and died.

=== Pop-up problems ===
During the late 1960s, the combination of helicopter and anti-tank missiles improved to the point where they became a major threat to armored operations. The U.S. led the field with their TOW missile on the Cobra gunship, demonstrating this powerful combination in combat in 1972's Easter Offensive. The Soviets initially lagged the U.S., but the introduction of the 9K114 Shturm (known in the west as the AT-6 "Spiral") missile on the Mi-24 "Hind" in the mid-1970s offered the USSR a level of superiority.

Unlike fixed-wing aircraft, attack helicopters had the ability to loiter near the front behind cover and pick their targets. They would then "pop up", launch a missile, and return to cover as soon as the missile hit its target. Using fast-reacting wire-guided or radio-command missiles meant the total engagement time was kept to a minimum, as there was little or no "lock-on" time required; the operator simply picked his target, fired, and adjusted its flight path while it flew.

Against these targets, the Vulcan/Chaparral combination was effectively useless. The Vulcan could react quickly enough to the fleeting targets, but its 20 mm gun had an effective range of only about 1,200 meters, far shorter than the 3,000 to 5,000 meters range of the "Spiral". While the Chaparral had enough range to engage the "Hind", its lengthy lock-on period meant they would have hit their target and hidden behind terrain again before the Sidewinder would reach it. Additionally, the older Sidewinder missiles used on Chaparral required hot targets, and had very limited capability against helicopters.

The limited effectiveness of the Vulcan/Chaparral was not the only problem the US Army was facing in the late 1970s. At the time, they were also in the process of introducing the new M1 Abrams and M2 Bradley vehicles, which had dramatically improved cross-country performance. The M113-based Vulcan and Chaparral could not keep up with them on the advance, and would leave them open to attack in a fast moving front.

=== Sergeant York DIVAD ===
For all of these reasons, the Army developed the "Advanced Radar-directed Gun Air Defense System" (ARGADS) requirement for a new weapon system with the speed of the Vulcan and range of the Chaparral, intending to replace them both with a chassis that could keep up with the new tanks in combat. They also worked in the original FLIR/laser requirement. The system was later renamed "Division Air Defense" (DIVAD).

At the time, most U.S. military policy was based on the US Air Force quickly gaining air superiority and holding it throughout a conflict. In keeping with this, the Army had previously placed relatively low priority on anti-aircraft weapons. This gave them time to mature through testing and shakedowns. In the case of DIVADs the threat was considered so serious and rapidly developing that the Army decided to skip the traditional development period and try to go straight into production by using a number of "off-the-shelf" parts. Colonel Russell Parker testified before the Senate Armed Services Committee in March 1977 that "We expect this somewhat unorthodox approach to permit a much reduced development time, thus resulting in an earliest fielding date, albeit with higher but acceptable risks... the manufacturer will be required by the fixed price warranty provisions, to correct deficiencies." It was claimed that this would cut up to five years from the development cycle, although it would require problems to be found and fixed on the operational vehicles.

This system became the M247 Sergeant York DIVAD (Division Air Defense), a self-propelled anti-aircraft weapon developed by Ford Aerospace in the late 1970s, which featured twin radar-directed 40 mm rapid-fire guns.

Operational test and evaluation (OT&E) of the M247 T&E concluded that the system's gun could perform the mission as originally specified, but tests also showed that the system had considerable reliability problems, many as the result of trying to adapt a radar system developed for aircraft to the ground role. Subsequent production tests 5 turned up a continued variety of problems, failing 22 of 163 contract requirements, and 22 serious failures in operational readiness. The M247 OT&E Director, Jack Krings, stated the tests showed, "...the SGT YORK was not operationally effective in adequately protecting friendly forces during simulated combat, even though its inherent capabilities provided improvement over the current [General Electric] Vulcan gun system. The SGT YORK was not operationally suitable because of its low availability during the tests."

On 27 August 1985, Secretary of Defense Caspar Weinberger halted the M247 project after about 50 vehicles had been produced.

=== HAWK medium range SAM ===
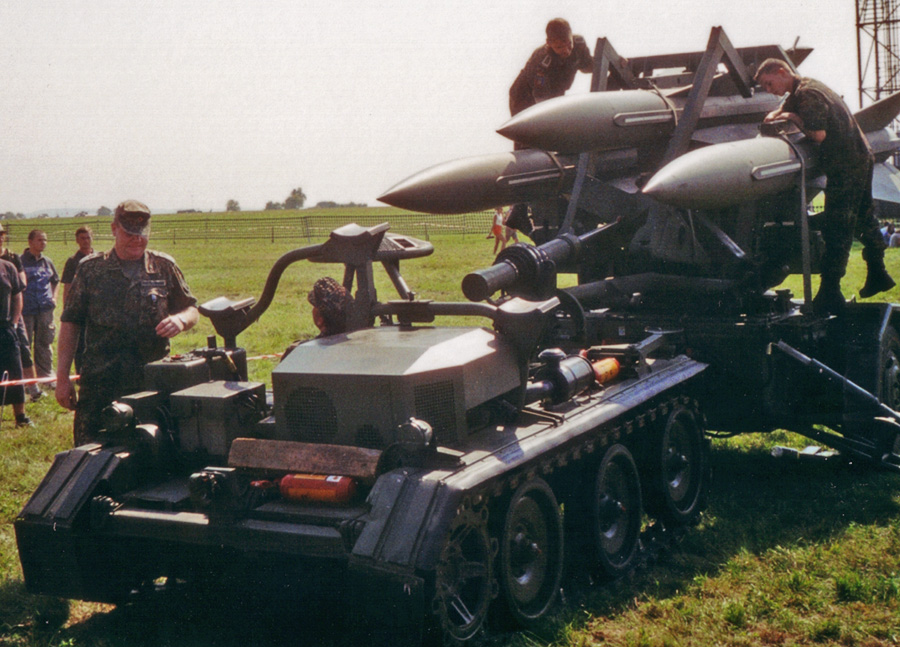
A HAWK system in service with the German Luftwaffe before it was phased out

The Raytheon MIM-23 HAWK is an American medium range surface-to-air missile. As a backronym, some consider HAWK to stand for Homing All the Way Killer or Home And Weekend Killer. The HAWK was initially designed to destroy aircraft and was later adapted to destroy other missiles in flight. The missile entered service in 1960, and a program of extensive upgrades has kept it from becoming obsolete. It was superseded by the MIM-104 Patriot in United States Army service by 1994. It was finally phased out of US service in 2002, the last users, the US Marine Corps replacing it with the man-portable, IR-guided, visual range FIM-92 Stinger. The missile was also produced outside the US in Western Europe and Japan.

Although the United States never used the Hawk in a combat situation, it has been employed numerous times by foreign nations. Approximately 40,000 of the missiles were produced.

== Current air defense ==
Short Range Air Defense (SHORAD) is a category of anti-aircraft weapons and tactics that have to do with defense against low-altitude air threats, primarily helicopters and low-flying close air support aircraft such as the A-10, Su-25 or MiG-27. SHORAD and its complements, HIMAD (High to Medium Air Defense) and THAAD (Terminal High Altitude Area Defense) divide air defense of the battlespace into domes of responsibility based on altitude and defensive weapon ranges.

SHORAD teams are attached as organic air defense assets at the battalion or brigade level. US SHORAD teams are based around the FIM-92 Stinger missile and its mounted platforms, the M1097 Avenger and M-SHORAD Stryker platforms (replacing the M6 Linebacker). Airborne and Air Assault units primarily employ MANPADS teams for SHORAD; armored units rely on the Linebacker and Bradley Stinger Fighting Vehicle. However, post-2006, there were no Linebacker units left in service, as all vehicles had been converted back to the Bradley ODS standard.

=== Stinger ===
The FIM-92 Stinger is a personal portable infrared homing surface-to-air missile developed in the United States and entered into service in 1981. Used by the militaries of the U.S. and by 29 other countries, the basic Stinger missile has to-date been responsible for 270 confirmed aircraft kills. It is manufactured by Raytheon Missile Systems and under license by EADS in Germany, with 70,000 missiles produced. It is classified as a Man-Portable Air-Defense System (MANPADS).

Initial work on the missile was begun by General Dynamics in 1967 as the Redeye II. It was accepted for further development by the U.S. Army in 1971 and designated FIM-92; the Stinger appellation was chosen in 1972. Because of technical difficulties that dogged testing, the first shoulder launch was not until mid-1975. Production of the FIM-92A began in 1978 to replace the FIM-43 Redeye.

Light to carry and relatively easy to operate, the FIM-92 Stinger is a passive surface-to-air missile, shoulder-fired by a single operator, although officially it requires two. The FIM-92B can attack aircraft at a range of up to 15,700 feet (4,800 m) and at altitudes between 600 and 12,500 feet (180 and 3,800 m). The missile can also be fired from the M-1097 Avenger vehicle and the M6 Linebacker, an air defense variant of the M2 Bradley IFV. The missile is also capable of being deployed from Humvee Stinger rack, and can be used by airborne paratroopers. A helicopter launched version exists called the ATAS or Air-to-Air Stinger.

=== Short range radar ===
The AN/MPQ-64 Sentinel is a three-dimensional radar used to alert and cue Short Range Air Defense (SHORAD) weapons to the locations of hostile targets approaching their front line forces. The Sentinel radar is deployed with forward area air defense units of the U.S. Army and USMC. The radar uses an X-band range-gated, pulse-doppler system. The antenna uses phase-frequency electronic scanning technology, forming sharp 3D pencil beams covering large surveillance and track volume. The radar automatically acquires, tracks, classifies, identifies and reports targets, including cruise missiles, unmanned aerial vehicles, rotary and fixed-wing aircraft. It uses a high scan rate (30 RPM) and operates at a range of 40 km. The radar is designed with high resistance to electronic countermeasures (ECM). Mounted on a towed platform, it can be positioned remotely from the rest of the unit, operated autonomously and communicate with the Fire Distribution Center (FDC) via wideband fiber-optic link. It can also distribute its data over a SINCGARS radio network.

=== Patriot ===
The MIM-104 Patriot is a surface-to-air missile (SAM) system, the primary of its kind used by the United States Army and several allied nations.

On 15 October 1964, the Secretary of Defense directed that the Army Air Defense System for the 1970s (AADS-70s) program name be changed to Surface-to-Air Missile, Development (SAM-D). In 1975, the SAM-D missile successfully engaged a drone at the White Sands Missile Range. In 1976, it was renamed the PATRIOT Air Defense Missile System. The MIM-104 Patriot would combine several new technologies, including the phased array radar and track-via-missile guidance. Full-scale development of the system began in 1976 and it was deployed in 1984. Patriot was used initially as an anti-aircraft system, but in 1988 it was upgraded to provide limited capability against tactical ballistic missiles (TBM) as PAC-1 (Patriot Advanced Capability-1).

It is manufactured by the Raytheon Company of the United States. The Patriot System replaced the Nike Hercules system as the U.S. Army's primary High to Medium Air Defense (HIMAD) platform, and replaced the MIM-23 Hawk system as the U.S. Army's medium tactical air defense platform. In addition to these roles, Patriot has assumed the role as the U.S. Army's anti-ballistic missile (ABM) platform, which today is Patriot's primary mission.

== See also ==
- Counter-RAM
- Field Artillery Branch (United States)
- Terminal High Altitude Area Defense
- United States Army Air Defense Artillery School
