= Hoàng Cầm (general) =

Vietnamese general

Colonel General Hoàng Cầm

Vice chairman of the Military Governing Committee Saigon-Gia Dinh
- In office 1 May 1975 – 20 January 1976
- President: Trần Văn Trà

Personal details
- Born: Đỗ Văn Cầm; 30 April 1920 Ứng Hòa, Hà Tây, Tonkin (French protectorate)
- Died: 19 August 2013 (aged 93)
- Party: Communist Party of Vietnam
- Awards: Ho Chi Minh Order

Military service
- Allegiance: Democratic Republic of Vietnam and later Vietnam
- Branch/service: People's Army of Vietnam
- Rank: Colonel General
- Battles/wars: First Indochina War; Battle of Đông Khê; Battle of Điện Biên Phủ; Vietnam War; Operation Birmingham; Operation El Paso; Operation Attleboro; Battle of Phước Long; Battle of Xuân Lộc

Hoàng Cầm (born Đỗ Văn Cầm) (1920–2013) was a colonel general in the People's Army of Vietnam (PAVN).

== Early years ==
Hoàng Cầm was born Đỗ Văn Cầm in Cao Sơn, Ứng Hòa district, Hà Tây province of the Tonkin Protectorate. Cầm had a poor childhood, was orphaned at age of 12. He joined Tirailleurs indochinois stationed at Lai Châu for a living at age of 21. Two years later he was transferred to Hà Nội, but deserted thus escaping from Japanese coup d'état in French Indochina in March 1945. Cầm joined the Youth Union of Hà Nội in July 1945, then joined National Salvation Army (Viet Minh) of Hà Nội after August Uprising and changed his name to Hoàng Cầm.

== Military career ==
In the First Indochina War, Hoàng Cầm led the 130th battalion of the 209th regiment in the Battle of Đông Khê, then the 209th regiment of the 312th Brigade in the Battle of Điện Biên Phủ.

In 1966, Senior Colonel Cầm led the PAVN 9th Infantry Division fighting against the U.S. Army 1st Infantry Division in a series of operations, including Operation Birmingham, Operation El Paso, and Operation Attleboro.

He led the PAVN 4th Corps in the Battle of Phước Long and Battle of Xuân Lộc.
