= John H. Hay =

United States Army general

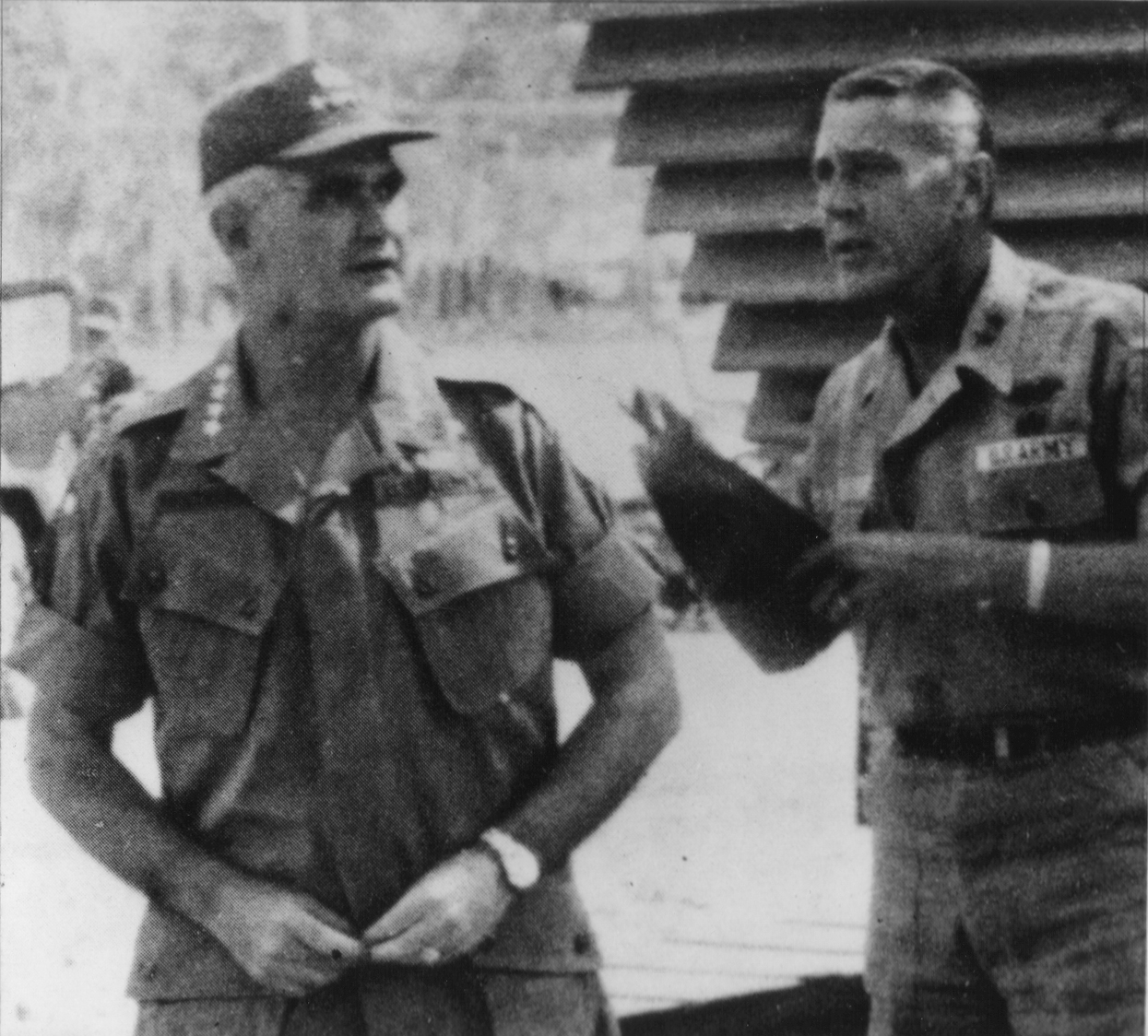
- Hay (right) with William Westmoreland, c. 1967
- Born: John Hancock Hay Jr. October 2, 1917; Thief River Falls, Minnesota, US
- Died: December 18, 1995 (aged 78)
- Military career
- Branch: United States Army
- Service label: 1938–1973
- Rank: Lieutenant general
- Commands: 327th Infantry Regiment; Berlin Brigade; 1st Infantry Division; XVIII Airborne Corps
- Wars: World War II; Vietnam War
- Awards: Distinguished Service Cross; Army Distinguished Service Medal; Silver Star (4); Legion of Merit (2); Distinguished Flying Cross (4); Bronze Star Medal (3); Air Medal (26); Army Commendation Medal

John Hancock Hay Jr. (October 2, 1917 – December 18, 1995) was a lieutenant general in the United States Army who served as commander of the Berlin Brigade, the 1st Infantry Division during the Vietnam War and XVIII Airborne Corps.

== Background ==
Hay was born in Thief River Falls, Minnesota.

== Military career ==
=== World War II ===
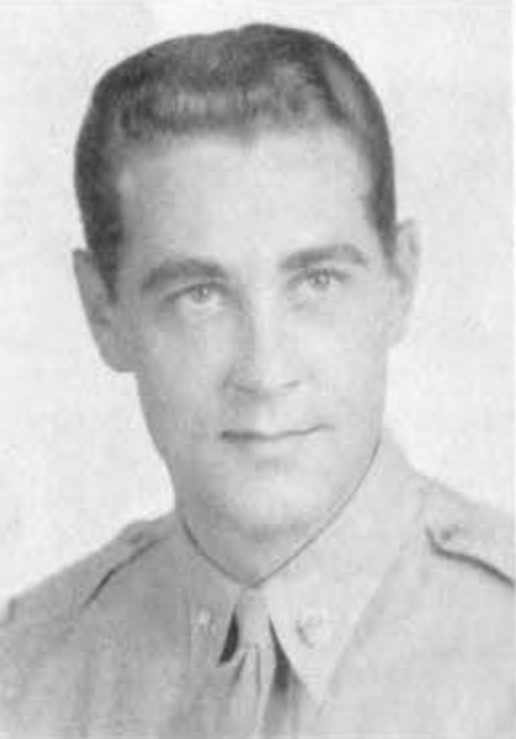
Hay as a Second Lieutenant c. 1941

Hay served with the 10th Mountain Division in Italy during World War II. He reached the rank of major, and was awarded the Silver Star and Legion of Merit

=== Interbellum ===
Hay served as commander of the 1st Airborne Battle Group, 327th Infantry Regiment from September 1959 to July 1960 and later as chief of staff of the 101st Airborne Division until 1961. In 1962 he served with the Eighth United States Army in South Korea. Hay then commanded the Berlin Brigade from 1964 to 1966.

=== Vietnam War ===
Hay was assigned to South Vietnam in January 1967 as commanding general of the 1st Infantry Division and remained in this role until February 1968.

Hay subsequently was promoted to deputy commander of II Field Force, Vietnam and became commander of Capital Military Assistance Command at Camp Lê Văn Duyệt, Saigon and led the defense of Saigon during the May Offensive. He remained in this role until his departure from South Vietnam in August 1968. For his service in Vietnam, and command of the 1st Infantry Division, Hay was awarded the Distinguished Service Cross and Army Distinguished Service Medal.

=== Post-Vietnam ===
Hay served as commandant of the Command and General Staff College until the end of February 1971, and then commanded, as lieutenant general, the XVIII Airborne Corps from 1 March 1971 until his retirement in May 1973.
