= Nguyễn Văn Toàn (general) =

South Vietnamese general (1932–2005)

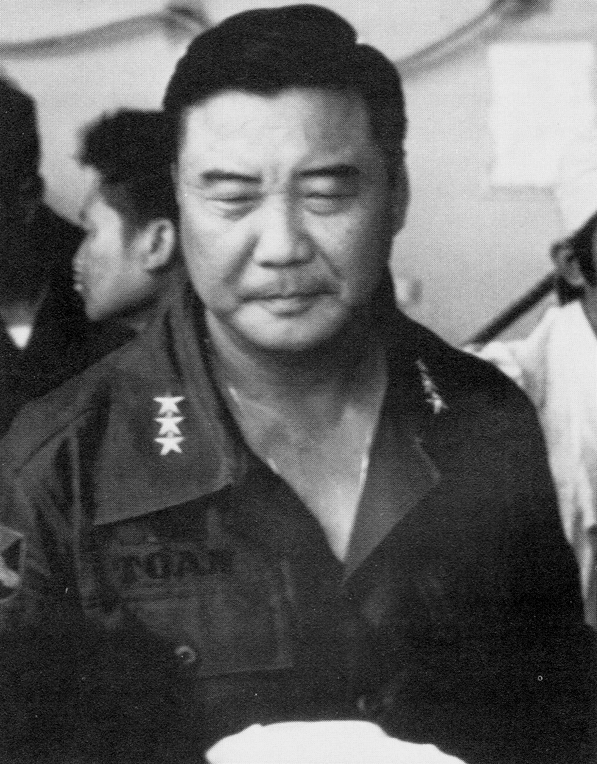
- Nguyễn Văn Toàn
- Born: October 6, 1932; Huế, French Indochina
- Died: October 19, 2005 (aged 73); Los Angeles, California, United States
- Military career
- Allegiance: South Vietnam
- Branch: Army of the Republic of Vietnam
- Service years: 1952–1975
- Rank: Lieutenant general (Trung Tướng)
- Nickname: The Cinnamon General
- Commands: 2nd Division; II Corps; Armor Branch; III Corps
- Conflicts: Vietnam War: 1972 Easter Offensive; First Battle of Quảng Trị; Battle of Kontum; 1975 Spring Offensive; Battle of Phan Rang; Battle of Xuân Lộc; Fall of Saigon

Nguyễn Văn Toàn (6 October 1932 – 19 October 2005) was a Lieutenant general in the South Vietnamese Army of the Republic of Vietnam (ARVN).

== Early life ==
Toàn was born on 6 October 1932 in Thừa Thiên province.

== Military career ==
He enlisted in the army in 1951 and graduated from the Dalat Military Academy in 1952, Following his graduation he went to France where he trained as an armor officer.

Toàn was relieved of command of the 5th Armored Squadron when his retreating armored elements killed over two dozen South Vietnamese Rangers. He returned to political favor when the officer that relieved him, General Nguyen Chanh Thi, was exiled for his unpopular political views.

From 1968 to 1972, Toan served as a Brigadier general commanding the 2nd Division where he was regarded as a competent leader. During this period he was reportedly to have made a fortune dealing in black market cinnamon taken from his division's area of operations, earning him the nickname The Cinnamon General. In 1969 US advisors gave the division the highest ratings in leadership and performance, but in 1968 advisors had recommended Toàn's dismissal for incompetence and his involvement in smuggling activities.

In January 1972 Toàn was replaced by the less competent but more placid Colonel Phan Hoa Hiep. Earlier that month he had been accused of raping a young woman in the officer's club, but the charges were dismissed.

Through the patronage of Nguyễn Cao Kỳ he was promoted to Lieutenant general and became assistant operations officer and armor commander in I Corps.

During the initial phases of the North Vietnamese Easter Offensive in March 1972, Toàn performed well, especially in the defense of Dong Ha, but he fell under the same cloud as his commander, Lieutenant general Hoàng Xuân Lãm, when the ARVN defense in I Corps collapsed. It was at this point that Toàn's political connections again became paramount when he was moved south on 10 May to take command of II Corps after the physical and emotional collapse of General Ngo Dzu. He took command at a point when the Central Highlands had become the second front of the offensive. Fortunately for Toàn, his senior U.S. advisor, John Paul Vann was fighting the battle for him. When the conflict settled down to a struggle for the city of Kontum, Toàn cleverly attended to administrative matters and left operational control in the hands of Vann and Lý Tòng Bá, commander of the 23rd Division.

By 1974 Defense Attaché Office senior advisor Colonel William LeGro stated that Toàn had "a deserved reputation as a forceful, if not brilliant field commander... [who] employed his forces with considerable skill."

Toàn remained in the command of II Corps until December 1974 when at the insistence of Vice-President Trần Văn Hương he was relieved of command by President Nguyễn Văn Thiệu during an anti-corruption campaign and replaced by General Phạm Văn Phú. Thiệu apparently gave in to Hương reluctantly because he knew that despite the charges Toàn was a thoroughly competent field commander. The change of command in II Corps contributed to the events that finally led to the collapse of II Corps in March–April 1975. ARVN observers believed that Toàn would have discerned the PAVN's attack plans and he was planning to launch a spoiling attack on PAVN units in Đức Cơ district before his relief.

Toàn was assigned as chief of armor and on 5 February 1975 was also given command of III Corps replacing General Dư Quốc Đống, who had resigned in January after losing the Battle of Phước Long.

During the North Vietnamese Ho Chi Minh Campaign of 1975, following the disastrous Battle of Ban Me Thuot and the withdrawal of South Vietnamese forces from the Central Highlands, what remained of II Corps was merged into III Corps on 4 April. A forward III Corps command post under the command of Lieutenant general Nguyễn Vĩnh Nghi, was established at Phan Rang Air Base. On 16 April under pressure from People's Army of Vietnam (PAVN) forces, the base was abandoned and Nghi and his remaining forces were captured.

After the defeat of ARVN forces at the Battle of Xuan Loc (9-21 April), III Corps began consolidating its forces and prepared a plan which was submitted to the Joint General Staff (JGS) for the defense of the remaining III Corps' territory and the Capital Military District. As conceived by Toàn, the plan called for organizing five major resistance centers. These centers were to extend their defense areas outward beyond the effective range of PAVN 130-mm. guns; five different fronts would be connected as to form an arc enveloping the entire area west, north and east of Saigon: the Củ Chi front to the northwest, defended by the 25th Division; the Bình Dương front to the north, defended by the 5th Division; the Biên Hòa front to the northeast, defended by the 18th Division; the Vũng Tàu and National Route 15, defended by the 1st Airborne Brigade, one battalion of the 3rd Division, armor elements and Regional and Popular Forces organic to the sector involved; the Long An front for which the Capital Military District (CMD) Command was responsible (with the reconstituted remnants of the 22nd Division. In particular, Route 15 was to be kept open as the final retreat route toward the sea if need be. As field commander, Toàn was delegated full power of decision, and he was to implement the plan with the full support of the JGS.

On the night of 28 April Toàn moved his III Corps headquarters from Bien Hoa Air Base to Gò Vấp district closer to Saigon. At midday on 29 April Toàn met with 18th Division commander Major general Lê Minh Đảo, III Corps Armored Task Force commander Brigadier general Trần Quang Khôi and Marine deputy commander Colonel Nguyen Thanh Tri to discuss the close-in defense of Saigon. Toàn ordered Đảo to defend Long Binh Post, Khôi to defend Biên Hòa and the remaining two Marine brigades to be assigned to each of Đảo and Khôi. Toàn then flew in his helicopter out to the US fleet claiming that he was ordered to liaise with US Marine officers there, but knowing that the Dương Văn Minh government meant the end of South Vietnam he deserted the ARVN. With Toàn's departure command of III Corps broke down and its constituent units fought independently.

== Awards ==
- South Vietnam :
  - Commander of the National Order of Vietnam
  - Army Distinguished Service Order, First Class
  - Air Force Distinguished Service Order, First Class
  - Gallantry Cross With Palm
