= Republic of Vietnam Armored Cavalry =

Armored component of the Republic of Vietnam Army

Republic of Vietnam Armored Cavalry Thiết giáp Kỵ binh Việt Nam Cộng hòa
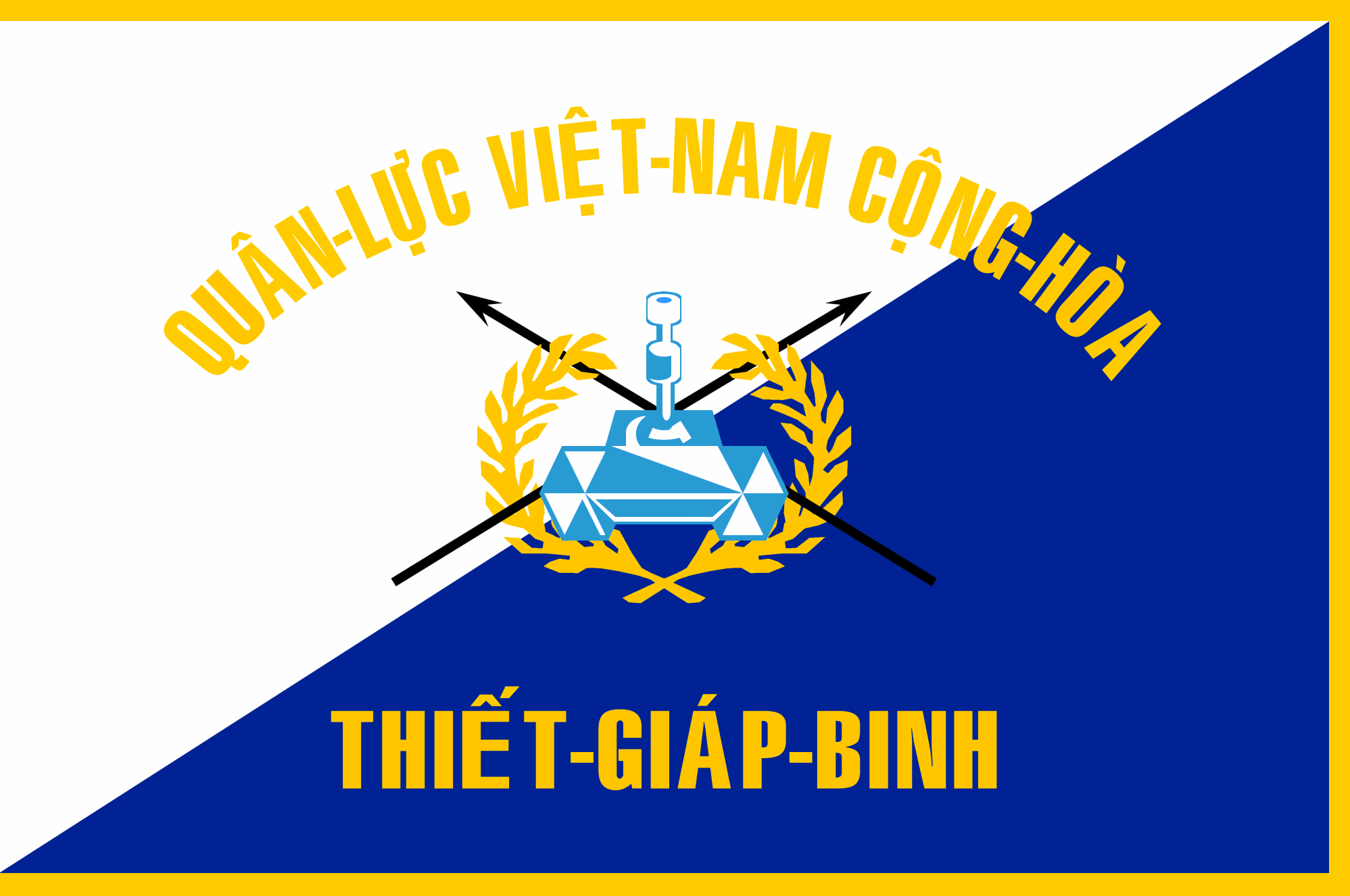
- Founded: 1955
- Disbanded: 30 April 1975
- Country: State of Vietnam; Republic of Vietnam
- Type: Armor
- Role: Search and destroy Rapid reaction force
- Size: 21 Squadrons (1972-1975): 3 Tank Squadrons; 18 Cavalry Squadrons
- Part of: Army of the Republic of Vietnam
- Garrison/HQ: Đà Nẵng; Pleiku; Biên Hòa; Cần Thơ
- Nickname: Thiết Kỵ
- Engagements: Tet Offensive; Easter Offensive; Battle of Svay Rieng; 1975 Spring Offensive

Commanders
- Notable commanders: Nguyễn Văn Toàn; Lý Tòng Bá; Trần Quang Khôi; Nguyễn Trọng Luật

The Republic of Vietnam Armored Cavalry (1955–1975) (Vietnamese: Thiết giáp Kỵ binh Việt Nam Cộng hòa) was the armour branch of the Army of the Republic of Vietnam, serving as a mobile, heavy-firepower shock force on the battlefield. It frequently coordinated with Infantry, Airborne, Marine, and Ranger units to rapidly resolve engagements using "infantry-supporting-armor" tactics. The force was consistently a key participant in large-scale operations involving the Army, Navy, Air Force, and Artillery.

== History ==
Until late 1959, in addition to seven infantry divisions, the reorganised Army of the Republic of Vietnam had four separate armoured battalions. Each infantry division had one reconnaissance company (light armored vehicles). In addition there were an airborne brigade, a marine group, and a helicopter squadron.

In early 1964, Lt. Gen. Trần Văn Đôn - Minister of Defense and as the chief of the Joint General Staff (JGS) had combat elements included 97 infantry, 28 artillery, and six airborne battalions, two special forces groups, and six regiments of armored cavalry. Each armored cavalry regiment consisted of a squadron of M24 Chaffee tanks, a squadron of six-wheeled M8 armored cars, a reconnaissance squadron mounted in M114 armored fighting vehicles being used for command and reconnaissance, and two mechanized rifle squadrons equipped with M113 armored personnel carriers. The regiments never operated as entire entities. Rather, they sent out individual troops and squadrons to perform missions.

Two armored cavalry regiments were part of the JGS General Reserve. These units could be deployed to respond fours Corps' battle requirements for a few days to a few months, but ultimately they had to return to their home bases around Saigon to refit and to defend the capital against both the insurgents and coups. Other general reserve units included six battalions of paratroopers and five of marines.

By the end of 1970 the force structure appeared to have finally settled down. After two years little had changed. With nine infantry divisions, the airborne and marine divisions, two independent regiments, the regular army could marshal about 120 infantry battalions, plus 20 ranger, 9 airborne, and 9 marine battalions. The ranger battalions were apportioned between five group (regimental-level) headquarters. Saigon's 17 armored cavalry squadrons (also battalion-size units) were assigned either to the regular infantry divisions or to the newly activated armor brigades in each zone.

== Operations ==
=== 1968–1969: Tet Offensive and aftermath ===
From 30 January to 3 February 1968, the ARVN 8th Cavalry Squadron — in conjunction with the 45th Infantry Regiment, the 23rd Ranger Battalion, and the US 1st/503rd Infantry — repelled a surprise attack launched by the PAVN’s 33rd Infantry Regiment, two local force battalions, and four local force companies in Ban Me Thuot — the capital of Darlac province. The ARVN suffered 74 soldiers killed in action, while the PAVN sustained 900 casualties, including both killed and seriously wounded.

Meanwhile, in Pleiku city — the capital of Pleiku province, which housed the headquarters of the ARVN II Corps and the Pleiku Airbase — the 3rd Cavalry Squadron, along with the 11th and 22nd Ranger Battalions, supported by a platoon from the US 1st/69th Armor, two companies from the US 4th Engineer Battalion and elements of the US 52d Aviation Battalion, repelled an anticipated attack by the PAVN H15 Local Force Battalion, two sapper battalions, and the K31 Battalion, 40th Artillery. Allied forces suffered 28 killed, while the PAVN sustained 606 killed and 156 captured.

=== 1969–1971: Vietnamization and Cambodian Civil War ===
In February and March 1971, two attached troops (1/3rd, 1/8th) of the 2nd Armored Brigade along four subordinate squadrons (17th, 7th, 4th, 11th) of the 1st Armored Brigade under Col. Nguyễn Trọng Luật in ARVN I Corps formation took part in Operation Lam Son 719, suffered losses of 54 tanks and 87 combat vehicles.

=== 1972: Easter Offensive ===
1972 Offensive in Quảng Trị and Kontum

During April 1972, one attached squadron (18th Cavalry) from the 3rd Armored Brigade along four subordinate squadrons (20th Tank, 17th, 11th, 4th Cavalry) from the 1st Armored Brigade of Col. Nguyễn Trọng Luật joined the First Battle of Quảng Trị under the ARVN 3rd Division operational control, fighting alongside Marines and Rangers. By 2 May, the entire province of Quảng Trị, including Quảng Trị city, had fallen to PAVN, remnants of the defending forces retreated southward to Camp Evan, losing all their tanks, and retaining only armored cavalry assault vehicles.

In the Second Battle of Dakto, ARVN II Corps lost two infantry regiments (42nd, 47th) of the 22nd Division, as well as the division commander and his staff. The corps' attached 2nd Armored Brigade also lost most of its M41 tanks of 14th and 19th Cavalry Squadrons. In 10 May, Maj. Gen. Nguyễn Văn Toàn - chief of armor cum Assistant Commander for Operations of I Corps was appointed II Corps commander to replace Lt. Gen Ngô Du. Responsibily for the Kontum defence were placed on Gen. Toàn and the 23rd Division commander - Col. Lý Tòng Bá - who was also an armor commander. On 31 May, ARVN infantry supported by tanks from the 8th Cavalry Squadron dislodged PAVN troops from the northern part of the city. After several weeks of bloody fighting along Highway QL-14 at Chư Pao Pass, the 3rd Cavalry Squadron turned the entrenched PAVN position by maneuvering west, finally cleared the southern supply line to Kontum on 19 June.

In the Second Battle of Lộc Ninh, the 9th Infantry Regiment and the attached 1st Cavalry Squadron of ARVN III Corps' 5th Division suffered heavy losses. Just two hundred troops of the 9th Infantry and about two dozens vehicles of the 1st Cavalry would retreat to An Lộc. Admist the chaos following the collapse of Lộc Ninh, Col. Trương Hữu Đức, commanding the 5th Cavalry Squadron – which was attached to the 18th Division – was killed by PAVN anti-aircraft fire on an aerial reconnaissance mission north of Chơn Thành. After having suffered heavy losses from PAVN mortar and rocket barrages, reluctant support from the 5th Cavalry Squadron could not help the 1st Airborne Brigade destroy the blocking positions of the PAVN 7th Division at Chơn Thành on 11 April, in the prelude of the Battle of An Lộc. After five days of tough fighting from 23 to 29 April, the 32nd and 33rd Regiments of the 21st Division supported by the tank troop of the 5th Cavalry finally annihilated the PAVN blocking force and controlled the portion of Route 13 (QL13) between Lai Khê and Chơn Thành.

In mid-May, Task Force 15 (TF-15), comprising the 9th Division's 15th Infantry Regiment, and the 21st Division's 9th Cavalry Squadron, was formed to support the 32nd and 33rd Regiments at Tân Khai - Tàu Ô region. On 24 May, the 9th Cavalry was ambushed by the 141st Regiment of the PAVN 7th Division, and suffered heavy losses (8 KIA, 77 WIA, 8 MIA, 22 APCs damaged). However, aided by CBU strikes from the VNAF 3rd Air Division, TF-15 ultimately dislodged the PAVN blocking forces and linked up with the 1st Airborne Brigade near Thanh Bình hamlet, just south of An Lộc, on 8 June.

=== 1973–1974: Post-Paris Peace Accords ===
Operation Svay Rieng 1974

At the end of March 1974, People's Army of Vietnam (PAVN) Col. Gen. Trần Văn Trà's first strategic raid came with elements of the PAVN 5th Division attacked the district seat of Đức Huệ (in Hậu Nghĩa province west of Saigon), held by the 83rd Border Ranger Battalion. At the end of April, ARVN III Corps decided to crack the condor around Đức Huệ with a large-scale assault force combining several battalions of the 25th Division, the 7th Ranger Group, and local Regional Forces, all under direction of the 3rd Armored Brigade commanded by Brig. Gen. Trần Quang Khôi. Khôi organized his forces to three subordinate units: Task Force (TF) 315, 318 and 322. Each TF was a composite unit comprising an Infantry/Ranger battalion, an artillery battery, and an armor squadron. The plan called for the Regional Forces and other ARVN units to attack and prevent the retreat of the PAVN elements surrounding Đức Huệ. On 27 April, the VNAF fighters launched the first blows of the operation, striking targets around Đức Huệ. ARVN units quickly blocked the PAVN escape routes. During the night, Khôi's Armors and Rangers using boats to float their armor across the Vàm Cỏ Đông River, struct west and blasted into Cambodia. Soon they turned south, where they encountered the PAVN logistic areas. With little room to run, the PAVN quickly routed, and many supply depots were discovered. ARVN casualties were light, while PAVN losses were very high. The Svay Rieng operation was a remakable combined-arms operation, but it was the ARVN's last true offensive of the war.

== Formation and units ==
By 1973, the ARVN Armor Branch comprised three Tank Squadrons and 18 Cavalry Squadrons organized into four brigades, with each brigade attached to a specific corps (dates of activation in parentheses). While the subordinate units of these armored brigades were often referred to as "Regiments" in US documents, ARVN generals regarded them as "Squadrons"; each unit fielded approximately 60 Armoured Fighting Vehicles, making it equivalent in strength to a US armored battalion.

- 1st Armored Brigade (1969, HQ at Đà Nẵng - I Corps):
  - 20th Tank Squadron (1971)
  - 17th, 11th, 7th, 4th Cavalry Squadrons
- 2nd Armored Brigade (1971, HQ at Pleiku - II Corps):
  - 21st Tank Squadron (1972)
  - 19th, 14th, 8th, 3rd Cavalry Squadrons
- 3rd Armored Brigade (1970, HQ at Biên Hòa - III Corps):
  - 22nd Tank Squadron (1972)
  - 18th, 15th, 10th, 5th, 1st Cavalry Squadrons
- 4th Armored Brigade (1969, HQ at Cần Thơ - IV Corps):
  - 16th, 12th, 9th, 6th, 2nd Cavalry Squadrons
