= Nguyễn Trọng Luật =

- Born: French Indochina
- Military career
- Allegiance: South Vietnam
- Branch: Vietnamese National Army; Army of the Republic of Vietnam
- Commands: 1st Armored Brigade; 24th Special Tactical Zone; Darlac Sector
- Conflicts: Siege of Plei Me; Operation Lam Son 719; First Battle of Quảng Trị; Battle of Ban Me Thuot

Nguyễn Trọng Luật was an officer in the South Vietnamese Army of the Republic of Vietnam (ARVN).

== Military career ==
During the October 1965 Siege of Plei Me Luật commanded the 1,400 man ARVN armored task force that was sent to relieve Plei Me camp. The column was ambushed by People's Army of Vietnam (PAVN) forces on the evening of 23 October suffering heavy casualties, but the ambush was repelled with US air support. The column eventually reached Plei Me on 25 October, breaking the siege. Luật kept his unit in place at the ambush site on the 23rd and 24th, refusing to move until resupplied because he feared another attack. In fact he wanted to return to Pleiku rather than proceed to Plei Me, and could only be persuaded to continue by a promise of US artillery support. With that in hand, he finally started his men toward Plei Me at 13:00 on the 25th. Experiencing only harassing small-arms fire, he and his men reached the camp at dusk.

During the 1968 Tet Offensive Luật commanded the 24th Special Tactical Zone, which incorporated Kontum Province. The senior adviser attached to his headquarters, Colonel James P. Cahill, coordinated the American portion of the joint defense plan. Reliable intelligence from multiple sources had indicated to them that Kontum city was likely to be attacked at some point during the week-long Tết holiday. The two commanders had reviewed and exercised the joint defense plan, increased their reconnaissance efforts, and strengthened the defenses of several key installations, adding new layers of razor wire and minefields outside the perimeter of Kontum Airfield. Luật also kept half of his troops on duty through the holiday. The attack on Kontum City began at 02:12 on 30 January, several companies from the K4 and K5 Battalions, 24th Regiment, and two companies from the 304th Battalion assaulted the compound of the 24th Special Tactical Zone several hundred meters to the west of the airfield. When PAVN troops penetrated the facility, Luật retreated to his private residence with one of his infantry companies, effectively abdicating his command duties. Fortunately for the defenders, the attackers seemed disorganized. The enemy overran a pair of 105-mm. howitzers, for example, but made no attempt to use or to disable them. They also ignored the headquarters of the 24th Special Tactical Zone and the home of the deputy province chief, two buildings that ought to have been on their target list.

During the 1971 Operation Lam Son 719 Luật commanded the 1st Armored Brigade which was attached to the Airborne Division. During the retreat from A Luoi on 18 March an 18 vehicle 1st Armored Brigade convoy was ambushed 4 km east of A Luoi with the lead vehicles destroyed by direct fire, blocking Route 9. M41 tanks and three M113 armored personnel carriers each towing a 105mm gun were among the vehicles stranded and Luật called in airstrikes to prevent them being used by the PAVN. On the night of 21 March the 1st Armored Brigade and 1st and 8th Airborne Battalions abandoned their positions south of FSB Bravo and began moving east. When informed by a prisoner that two PAVN regiments waited in ambush ahead, Luật, notified Airborne commander General Dư Quốc Đống of the situation. Đống landed forces and cleared the road, but never bothered to inform Luật. In order to avoid destruction on Route 9, Luật then ordered the column to abandon the road 5 miles (8.0 km) from the South Vietnamese border and plunged onto a jungle trail looking for an unguarded way back. The trail came to a dead end at the steep banks of the Sepon River and the force was trapped. Two bulldozers were finally helilifted into the ARVN perimeter to create a ford. The armored-Airborne column crossed into South Vietnam on 23 March.

On 2 April 1972 during the Easter Offensive, Luật's 1st Armored Brigade headquarters assumed command of all armored, infantry and Marine forces in the Đông Hà area. Those units included the 20th Tank Regiment, two squadrons of the 17th Armored Cavalry Regiment, the 2nd and 57th Regiments of the 3rd Division, the 3rd Battalion of the 258th Marine Corps Brigade and the survivors of the 56th Regiment from Camp Carroll. After a PAVN operational pause, the PAVN renewed their assault on 27 April, all along the defensive line, units were being overrun or pushed back. By 28 April it was obvious to Luật that the 1st Armored Brigade units were threatened with encirclement and he ordered his units into a fighting retreat south.

In early 1975 he was the Darlac Province chief. On 2 March 1975 a CIA officer flew out from Nha Trang to inform him of PAVN preparations to attack Ban Me Thuot, without offering information on the strength of the PAVN formations. On 12 March he was captured by the PAVN at Ban Me Thuot.

== Awards ==
- South Vietnam :
  - National Order of Vietnam
