= Firebase Thunder III =

U.S. Army firebase in Vietnam

Site information
- Type: Army
- Condition: abandoned

Location
- Coordinates: 11.444°N 106.62°E

Site history
- Built: 1968
- In use: 1968-70
- Battles/wars: Vietnam War

Garrison information
- Occupants: 2nd Battalion, 2nd Mechanized Infantry

Firebase Thunder III was a U.S. Army firebase located south of An Lộc, Binh Phuoc Province, in southern Vietnam.

== History ==
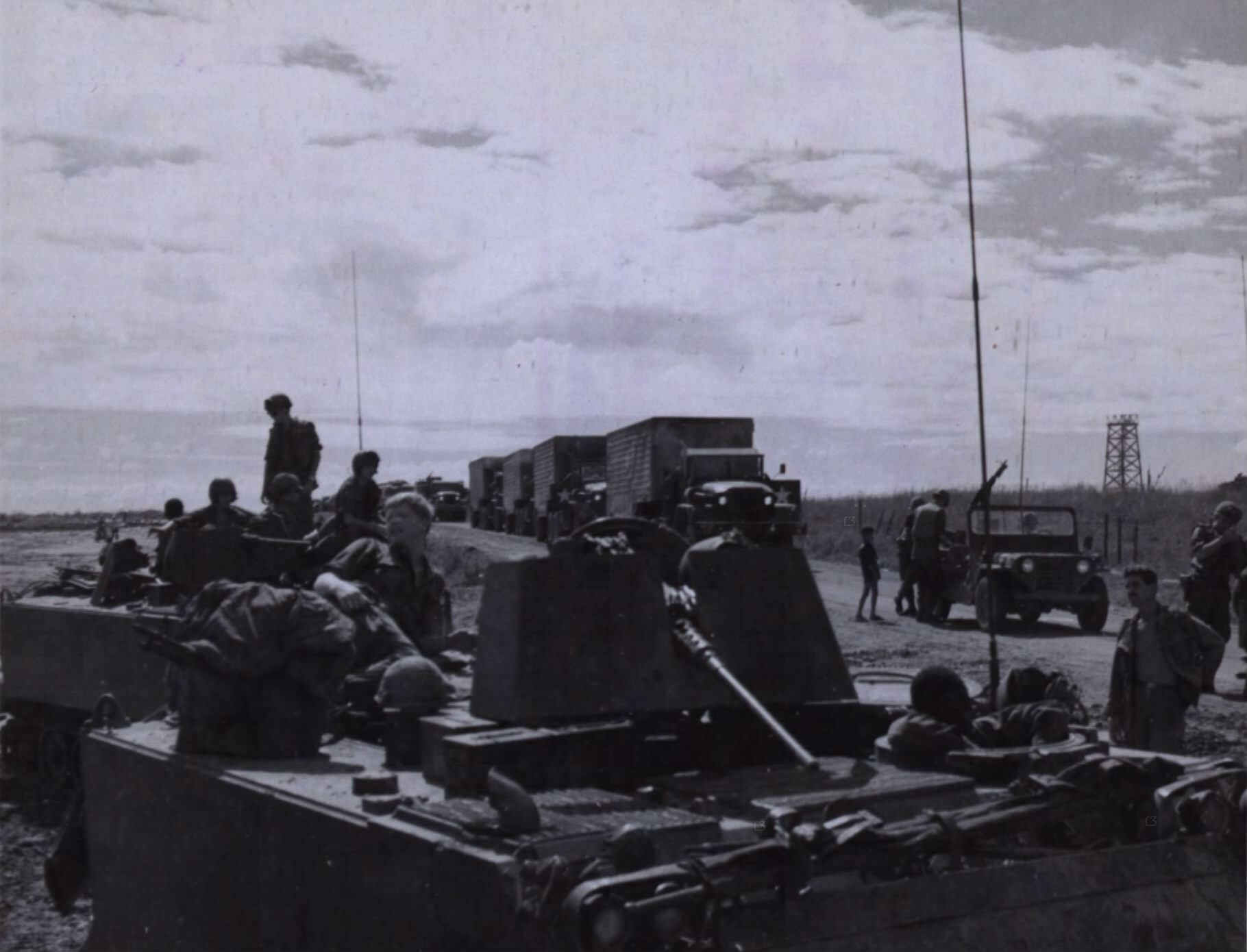
M-113 APCs escorting a truck convoy to Quan Loi, take a rest between Firebases Thunder II and III, 15 January 1969

Thunder III was located along Route 13 (known as Thunder Road by U.S. forces) approximately 23 km south of An Lộc and 28 km north of Lai Khê.

The 2nd Battalion, 2nd Mechanized Infantry was based at Thunder III.

On 11 January 1969 a convoy of vehicles from the 1st Squadron, 11th Armored Cavalry Regiment was ambushed on Route 13 near Thunder III. First Lieutenant Harold A. Fritz was later awarded the Medal of Honor for his actions during the engagement.

On 22 August 1969, a Boeing CH-47C Chinook medium-lift helicopter, #68-15824, crashed 8 km east of Thunder III with six fatalities. F battery 16th arty was there in November 1969 Thunder III was assaulted by People's Army of Vietnam (PAVN) sappers under cover of mortar fire on the early morning of 5 November 1969.

Units based at Thunder III included:

- 2nd Battalion, 12th Artillery
- 3rd Battalion, 197th Artillery
- B Company and elements of C Company, 554th Engineer Battalion
