= Trần Quang Khôi =

South Vietnamese military personnel (1930–2023)

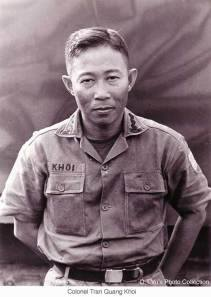
- Born: 24 January 1930; Đa Phước Hội village, Mỏ Cày district, Bến Tre Province, French Indochina
- Died: 1 April 2023 (aged 93); Chantilly, Virginia, U.S.
- Spouse: Lam Tu-Anh
- Children: Phong Tran, Huong Tran, Xuan Tran, Trung Tran and 13 grandchildren.
- Military career
- Allegiance: South Vietnam
- Branch: Vietnamese National Army; Army of the Republic of Vietnam
- Service years: 1952–1975
- Rank: Brigadier general
- Commands: 3rd Armored Brigade
- Conflicts: Battle of Svay Rieng; Battle of the Iron Triangle; Fall of Saigon

Trần Quang Khôi (24 January 1930 – 1 April 2023) was a Brigadier general in the Army of the Republic of Vietnam (ARVN).

== Early life and education ==
Trần was born in Đa Phước Hội village, Mỏ Cày district, Bến Tre Province, French Indochina to his father Trần Quang Chiêu and mother Lê Thị Hòa. He grew up in Vĩnh Thanh Vân village, Châu Thành Rạch Giá, Kiên Giang Province.

== Military career ==
He graduated from the Vietnamese National Military Academy in Đà Lạt, class of 1952. In 1955, he attended the Saumur Cavalry School in France, in 1955 (Advanced Course). In 1959, he attended the United States Army Armor School in Fort Knox, Kentucky.

He obtained a Master of Military Arts and Sciences (MMAS) degree from US Army, Command and General Staff College in Fort Leavenworth, Kansas, class of 1972–1973.

In 1974, he commanded the 3rd Armored Brigade of III Corps and was considered by his former US advisors to be the best armor officer in the ARVN.

In March 1974, he commanded the armored forces in the Battle of Svay Rieng, the last major South Vietnamese offensive of the war. In May 1974, his armored forces participated in the Battle of the Iron Triangle.

== Later life ==
He was captured on 30 April 1975 following the Fall of Saigon and spent 17 years in a re-education camp.

After having arrived in the United States in May 1993 under the Humanitarian Resettlement Program (HO), part of the Orderly Departure Program (ODP), Khôi studied at the George Mason University in Virginia, majored in French Studies, and graduated with a Master of Arts degree in 1998.

He died in Chantilly, Virginia on 1 April 2023, at the age of 93.

== Biography ==
Read by Senator Richard H. Black before the Senate of Virginia

On the 10th of February 2014

BG Tran Quang Khoi is a 1952 graduate of the Vietnamese National Military Academy. He received an MA in French Studies from George Mason University in Virginia.

His Military education included: the French Cavalry School at Saumur in 1955 (Advanced Course), the US Army Armor School at Fort Knox in 1959 (Advanced Course), and the US Army Command and General Staff College at Fort Leavenworth in 1972–1973 In early 1970, his combined-arms Task Force 318 spearheaded the US/VN incursion into Cambodia destroying large NVA logistical installations and damaging heavily NVA main forces.

In November 1970, he organized, trained 3rd Armored Cavalry Brigade and commanded it in Cambodia to secure the border against NVA infiltrations into III Corps area.

The Paris Peace Accords signed on 27 January 1973 nominally ended the VN War but in fact, provided opportunity for North VN to take over South VN. As the U.S. withdrew troops and cut support, the military situation grew increasingly serious. Finally, North VN supported by the Soviet Union and Communist China used armed aggression against the Republic of South VN.

In March 1974, NVA 5th Infantry Division surrounded DUC Hue Base defended by ARVN 83rd Ranger Battalion. In 3 days the ARVN 3rd Cav. Brigade (+) broke the siege defeating the NVA 5th Division by a night river crossing and a surprise counterattack in Cambodia.

During the last days if the VN War, the III Corps Assault Force (IIICAF) under BG Tran Q. Khoi command defended Bien Hoa City, defeated NVA 341st Division in its vicinity, forcing the enemy to give up the fight an withdraw with very heavy casualties.

Then the NVA concentrated all of his forces (15 divisions) to attack Saigon.

In the morning of 30 April 1975, the IIICAF left Bien Hoa rushed to rescue Saigon but had to stop the fighting when BG Khoi heard the President’s voice on the radio ordering all ARVN to cease fire and surrender.

In the end, BG Khoi refused to flee the country with his C and C ship and joined his fighting men in captivity in North VN. Only with the help of Senator John McCain did the Communists release him from concentration camps after 17 years and let him go to the U. S. to reunite with his family in Virginia in May 1993.

== Quotes ==
- I was most sorry for the outcome of the war, but I had done my best. I let my troops execute the President's final order for themselves: I had nothing more to say. But deep in my heart, I silently thanked all of them for their courage, sacrifice, and dedication until the very last minute of the war. Together, we had fulfilled our obligation and oath of allegiance.
- I shall never repent having done what I did, nor complain about the consequences of my captivity. If history were to repeat itself, I would choose the same path. By doing so, I know from experience that I would lose everything but HONOR.
