= Battle of Svay Rieng =

Part of the Vietnam War (1974)

- Part of the Vietnam War and Cambodian Civil War
Date	27 March – 2 May 1974
Location	Svay Rieng,Cambodia,Vietnam
Result	South Vietnamese victory

Belligerents
North Vietnam; Vietcong	South Vietnam; Supported by: Khmer Republic

Commanders and leaders
Unknown	Phạm Quốc Thuần; Trần Quang Khôi

Units involved
5th Division: 275th Regiment; 25th Sapper Battalion	25th Division: 46th Regiment; 50th Regiment; 7th Ranger Group; 3rd Armor Brigade

Casualties and losses
(Vietnam) 1,200+ killed and 65 captured	fewer than 100 killed

The Battle of Svay Rieng was the last major offensive operation of the Vietnam War to be mounted by the South Vietnamese Army of the Republic of Vietnam (ARVN) against the North Vietnamese People's Army of Vietnam (PAVN) forces.

== Battle ==
On 27 March 1974, PAVN sapper units attacked Đức Huệ (10.93°N 106.2°E) which was held by the ARVN 83rd Ranger Battalion. The initial attack was repulsed as was a subsequent infantry attack by the PAVN 5th Division. Following the failure of these attacks the PAVN laid siege to Đức Huệ.

Under orders to maintain a loose siege of Đức Huệ, the PAVN, assisted by the local sapper battalion, blocked the only land access to the camp and continued the artillery bombardment but abandoned the idea of taking it by storm. On the ARVN side, the 25th Division committed a task force consisting of a battalion of the 46th Infantry Regiment, a battalion of the 50th Infantry Regiment, and a tank company to break the siege. Fighting raged in the paddies east and north of the camp for several days, and the Republic of Vietnam Air Force (RVNAF) provided effective support to the counterattacking infantry, losing an A-1 Skyraider and an observation aircraft to SA-7 antiaircraft missiles. Meanwhile, the ARVN task force command post was hit by PAVN 107mm rocket fire and the commander was one of those killed. As April wore on, the threat of renewed assaults on Đức Huệ by the PAVN 5th Division remained. The situation was particularly dangerous because the PAVN 7th and 9th Divisions were probing aggressively in the eastern part of III Corps. Lieutenant general Phạm Quốc Thuần, III Corps commander, determined that he must reduce the threat to his western flank and the Tây Ninh corridor while he had the opportunity to do so before the onset of the southwest monsoon. After the rains started, most of the land around Đức Huệ and the Angel's Wing (11.03°N 106.163°E) would be under water.

The plan was complicated but workable. Thuần used 18 of his own maneuver battalions and flew to Can Tho where he coordinated with General Nguyễn Vĩnh Nghi for a supporting attack by two IV Corps battalions from the Mộc Hóa sector. The details and timing of the operation were carefully safeguarded, and few, if any, Americans in the Defense Attaché Office, Saigon knew anything about it until 27 April when 45 RVNAF sorties struck targets in Cambodia and known and suspected bases of the PAVN 5th Division. These strikes began Phase I, which lasted through the 28th and included infantry sweeps by two Regional Force (RF) battalions between the Vàm Cỏ Đông River and the northern shoulder of the Angel's Wing. Meanwhile, the 49th Infantry Regiment, less one battalion, and the 7th Ranger Group, also short one battalion, left assembly areas near Hiệp Hoà (10.913°N 106.318°E) on the Vàm Cỏ Đông and advanced westward through the swamplands, past Đức Huệ to the Cambodian frontier. To the south, three RF battalions provided security by conducting reconnaissance in northern Long An Province, generally between the Bo Bo Canal and the Vàm Cỏ Đông. Another supporting maneuver, which quickly developed into a major operation, was the attack into Svay Rieng Province south of the Elephant's Foot (10.87°N 105.9°E) by two battalions from IV Corps. The northernmost of the two advanced from the border area north of Mộc Hóa and established a blocking position near the local Route 1012 that led eastward from an assembly area occupied by the PAVN 5th Division. The other battalion crossed midway between the Elephant's Foot and the tip of the Parrot's Beak and established a lodgment on the southeastern edge of the PAVN logistical base and assembly area in Svay Rieng.

While Phase I of the ARVN sweep into Svay Rieng was getting started, on 28 April the PAVN struck heavily at Long Khốt (10.89°N 105.787°E), an ARVN post and district town at the inside curve of the Elephant's Foot. Whether the attack was pre-planned or reactive was unknown, regardless, PAVN tanks were reported at first by the defenders. Later, aerial observers correctly determined that the vehicles were captured M113 armored personnel carriers. The defenders held strongly against the PAVN 275th Regiment and 25th Sapper Battalion of the 5th Division. More than 100 sorties were flown on the 28th against PAVN positions, weapons and vehicles in the Svay Rieng area, many of them in support of Long Khốt. On this same day, the ARVN at Long Khốt captured nine prisoners from the 275th Regiment and four from its supporting artillery, which had been employing 122mm guns and U.S. 105mm howitzers as well as AT-3 antitank missiles and SA-7 antiaircraft missiles. Many PAVN weapons were salvaged, and 75 PAVN soldiers were counted dead on the battlefield. Not only were the Long Khốt defenders tenacious and prepared for the onslaught, but the RVNAF proved its worth in close support as over the two days, the 27th and 28th, it flew 188 tactical and logistical sorties in the Svay Rieng Campaign. In a departure from normal practice, the 3rd Air Division supporting III Corps in the Svay Rieng campaign, located a forward command post at Cu Chi Base Camp alongside the III Corps forward command post in order to improve coordination and responsiveness. Combat pilots returned to their bases with morale-building reports about PAVN troops throwing down their weapons and running when faced with low-level strafing.

By the night of 28 April, 11 ARVN battalions of infantry, RF, and Rangers were conducting screening, blocking, and reconnaissance-in-force operations as a prelude to Phase II of the Svay Rieng sweep. Meanwhile, the RVNAF was attacking PAVN troop locations and bases, and Long Khốt was fighting off a violent PAVN armor, artillery, and sapper-infantry attack. In Phase II, originally planned by Thuần to encompass only three days of armored sweeps into the Cambodian bases of the PAVN 5th Division, three columns drove west, generally parallel to each other, crossing the frontier west of Go Dau Ha (11.112°N 106.153°E) and penetrating as deeply as 15km into Svay Rieng before wheeling south and southwest into Hậu Nghĩa Province. Making the main effort and the deepest penetration was Task Force 315 with the 15th Armored Cavalry Squadron, the 64th Ranger Battalion, and a company of medium tanks as its striking force. Supported by a composite battery of 105mm and 155mm artillery this northernmost column crossed the border through the paddies south of Highway 1 and attacked west, turning south short of the swampy ground east of Chiphu (11.037°N 106.01°E), following local Route 1012 toward the blocking position held by a IV Corps battalion near Ph Chek (10.935°N 106.059°E). It was screened on its right flank by a mobile RF battalion that advanced along Highway 1 about 12km inside the international frontier. Along the center axis, which started about 2km south of Task Force 315, was Task Force 318, built around the 18th Armored Cavalry Squadron, a Ranger battalion, a tank company and a howitzer battery. This column drove west for about 10km before turning inside the sweep south by Task Force 315. Task Force 310, the only one of the attacking columns without tanks, had a battalion each from the 18th and 25th Infantry Divisions and the 3rd Troop, 10th Armored Cavalry, along with a supporting howitzer battalion it crossed into Svay Rieng just north of the southern tip of the Angel's Wing, along Cambodian Route 1013 and wheeled south inside Task Force 318, generally along the international boundary. In reserve at Go Dau Ha Thuần had two companies of medium tanks of the 22nd Tank Battalion, a cavalry troop from the 1st Armored Cavalry Squadron, a battalion of infantry from the 18th Division, and a battery of 105mm howitzers. Designated Task Force 322, this powerful force was ready to exploit opportunities uncovered by the attacking echelons. The 3rd Armored Brigade controlled operations from Go Dau Ha. 54 UH-1 helicopters mustered for the campaign were effectively used in surprise air assaults into PAVN defenses. Secrecy was more rigidly enforced in this campaign than perhaps any operation since the ceasefire, partly because it was important to surprise the PAVN 5th Division in garrison and partly to conceal, for political reasons, an ARVN offensive into Cambodia.

By 29 April Task Force 315 had penetrated about 7km into Cambodia at the cost of only one wounded, but had killed nearly 50 PAVN and captured one prisoner. To the south Task Force 318 had experienced similar success, killing nearly 60 and capturing five while suffering only six wounded. The following morning, the 315th continued the attack, killing 40 more and sustaining light casualties. Meanwhile, the RVNAF was pounding the PAVN with nearly 200 sorties, accounting for nearly 100 killed, destroying many storage and defensive positions and knocking out mortar and antiaircraft positions. As the threat to the 5th Division base in southern Svay Rieng became critical the PAVN was compelled to reduce the pressure on Long Khốt and concentrate on attempting to relieve the E-6 and 174th Regiments and logistical installations lying in the path of the ARVN armored thrusts. By the end of April, nearly 300 PAVN soldiers had been killed in ground combat, over 100 more had been killed by RVNAF air strikes, and 17 prisoners of war were in ARVN hands. On the other hand, the speed, audacity and superior air-ground coordination that characterized the attack had kept South Vietnamese casualties extremely low: only 21 killed and 64 wounded. In fact, success was so striking that Thuần elected to extend the operation a few days.

Further west in the Elephant's Foot, matters were becoming desperate for the PAVN 275th Regiment and its supporting troops. The ARVN 7th Division had moved a forward command post into Mộc Hóa and was controlling the operation of two task forces then committed in the Elephant's Foot. One was composed of the 15th Infantry, 9th Division and part of the 16th Armored Cavalry Squadron; the other included the 10th Infantry and elements of the 6th Armored Cavalry Squadron, in 12 days of fighting in the border area, these two mobile task forces killed 850 PAVN soldiers, captured 31, collected over 100 weapons, and suffered fewer than 300 casualties, including 39 killed. Making the adjustments required by the situation, particularly the fact that the most lucrative PAVN contacts were being made in the southern sweeps of the 315th and 310th Task Forces, Thuần ordered Task Force 315 withdrawn from its northern axis on 2 May and returned to Go Dau Ha where it reverted to reserve. Meanwhile, Task Force 322 was committed and advanced about 4km into the center of the Angel's Wing, and the infantry battalions of the 25th Division continued their sweep between Đức Huệ and Go Dau Ha. By 6 May the land route to Đức Huệ Camp was secured and was being improved by ARVN combat engineers, the threat to the vital road junction at Go Dau Ha was substantially reduced, and the ARVN was in complete control of the battlefield. The tank-heavy 322nd Task Force turned south and headed for Ba Thu (10.895°N 106.132°E), the long-held PAVN base on the border southwest of Đức Huệ. On 10 May, the offensive ended, the last ARVN forces began their march homeward. Their sortie had killed nearly 300 PAVN soldiers, captured 17, collected 100 weapons, and seriously disrupted the communications and logistics of the PAVN 5th Division.

== Aftermath ==
The operation was an ARVN success. ARVN claimed PAVN losses of over 1,200 killed and 65 captured and the 5th Division's base area severely damaged, while ARVN losses were less than 100 killed. Despite its success, this was the last major South Vietnamese offensive of the war. The severe constraints on ammunition expenditures, fuel usage, and flying hours permitted no new initiatives. Although the South Vietnamese armed forces could react strongly to local threats within supporting distances of major bases, outlying threats were beyond their capability to cope with. For South Vietnam, a decline had begun to develop early in 1974 and would prove irreversible.
