= Củ Chi Base Camp =

Former army base in southern Vietnam

Củ Chi Base Camp (Củ Chi Army Airfield)
- Củ Chi District, in Vietnam
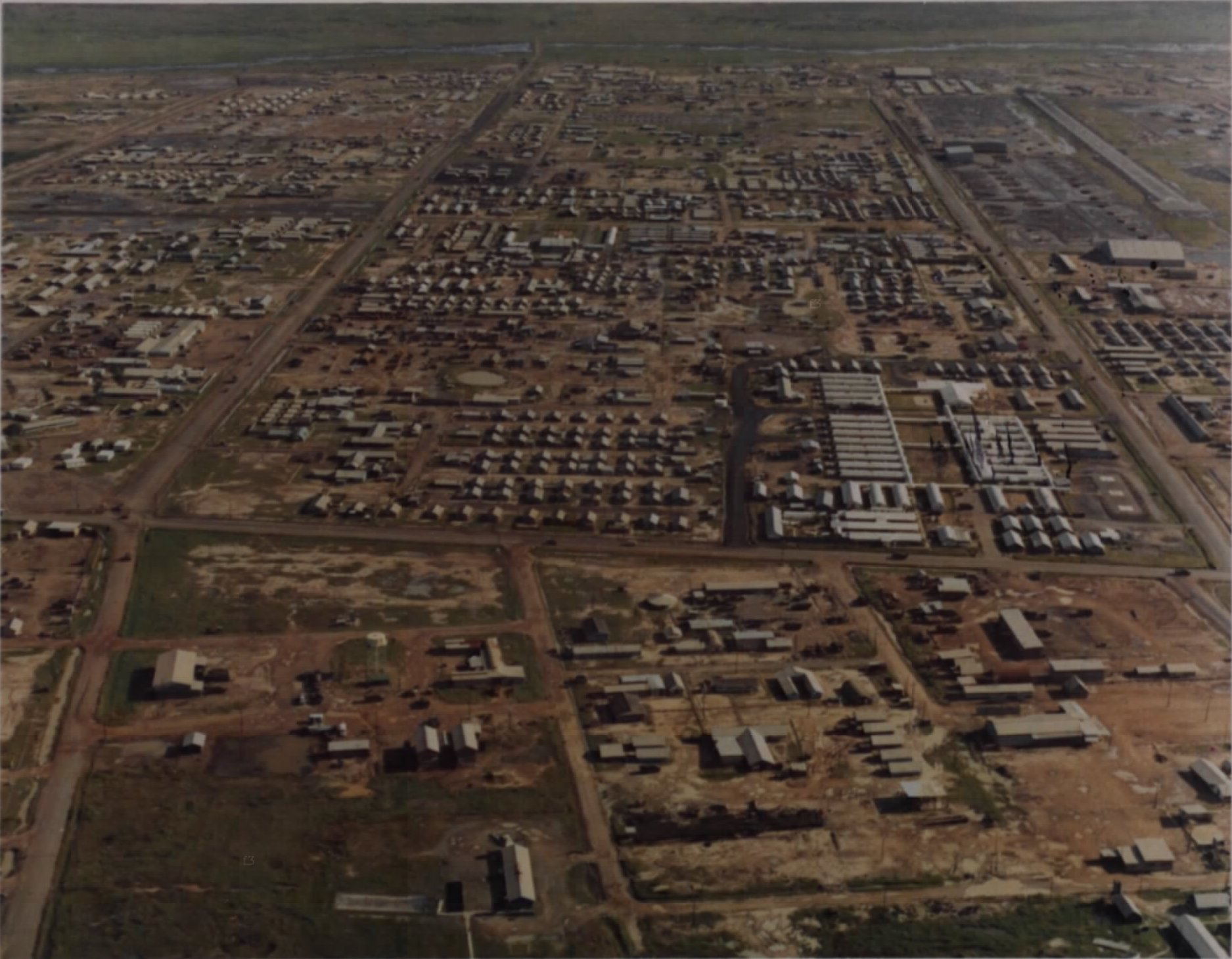
- A 1970 view of the 25th Infantry Division base camp

Site information
- Type: Army Base
- Operator: Army of the Republic of Vietnam (ARVN); United States Army (U.S. Army); People's Army of Vietnam
- Condition: Abandoned

Location
- Shown within Vietnam
- Coordinates: 10°59′15″N 106°30′45″E

Site history
- Built: 1965
- In use: 1966-
- Battles/wars: Vietnam War

Garrison information
- Garrison: 25th Infantry Division

Airfield information
- Elevation: 39 feet (12 m) AMSL
Runways
| Direction | Length and surface |
|---|---|
| 04/22 | 2,900 feet (884 m) Asphalt |

Củ Chi Base Camp (also known as Củ Chi Army Airfield) is a former U.S. Army and Army of the Republic of Vietnam (ARVN) base in the Củ Chi District northwest of Saigon in southern Vietnam.

== History ==
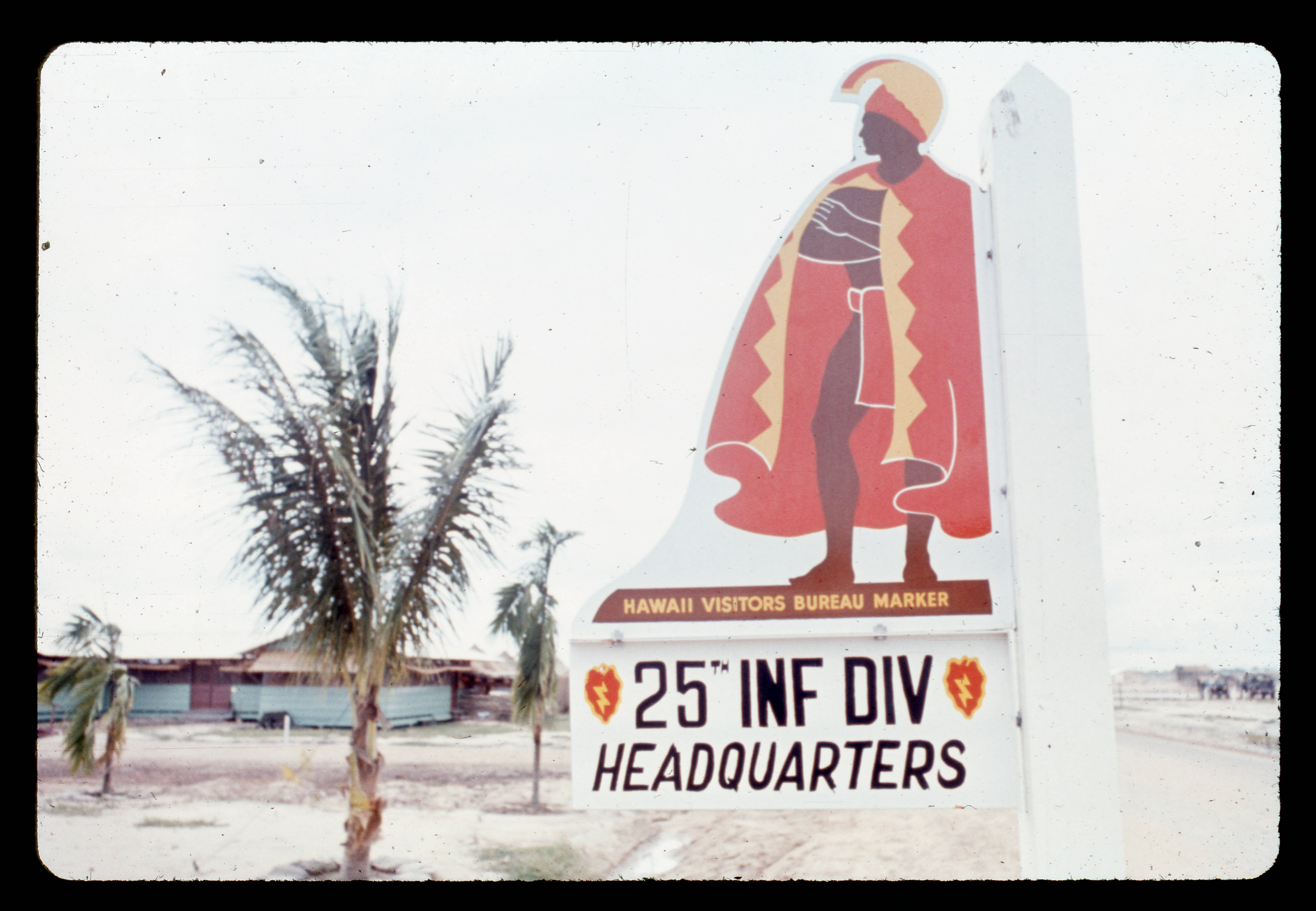
25th Infantry Division sign, Cu Chi, 1 September 1966

=== 1966–1970 ===
Củ Chi Base Camp was established in 1966 near Highway 1, 25 km northwest of Tan Son Nhut Air Base and 50 km southeast of Tây Ninh. The camp was located south of the Vietcong stronghold known as the Iron Triangle and was near and in some cases above the Cu Chi Tunnels.

On 23 February 1966, the 168th Engineer Battalion dispatched a platoon from Company C to help build the 25th Infantry Division’s base camp. MACV commander General William Westmoreland counted on the division to fill part of the gap in combat power and guard the approaches to Saigon from this direction. By this time, Westmoreland was convinced that major tactical headquarters and support units needed a full-time home where the individual soldier could train, take care of his equipment, and get some rest and relaxation. The 25th Division under the command of General Frederick C. Weyand made extensive studies before leaving Hawaii. Base development plans were put into final form following an advance party’s reconnaissance. The division’s 65th Engineer Battalion under Lt. Col. Carroll D. Strider assembled precut lumber kits for tents and latrines, which accompanied each unit. Upon arriving at Cu Chi, troops easily assembled the kits. Initial priority went to clearing fields of fire and constructing perimeter bunkers and wire barriers. Building semi-permanent buildings followed. In early April, the 362nd Light Equipment Company arrived to work on the camp’s road net and drainage ditches. Before the end of the month, the division headquarters and medical personnel occupied facilities consisting of shed-type prefabricated buildings.

The 25th Infantry Division had its headquarters at Củ Chi from January 1966 until February 1970.

Other units stationed at Củ Chi included:

- 1st Battalion, 8th Artillery (1966-1971)
- 7th Battalion, 11th Artillery (1966–70)
- 1st Battalion, 27th Artillery (February-December 1970)
- 2nd Battalion, 32nd Artillery (November 1965-April 1967, October 1969-January 1972)
- 6th Battalion, 77th Artillery (May 1967 – 1968)
- 1st Battalion, 321st Artillery (November 1967-February 1968)
- 1st Brigade, 1st Cavalry Division(January 1969)
- 2nd Brigade, 1st Infantry Division (September 1969) comprising:
  - 2nd Battalion, 16th Infantry
  - 1st Battalion, 18th Infantry
  - 2nd Battalion, 18th Infantry
- 2nd Brigade, 101st Airborne Division (February–October 1968) comprising:
  - 1st Battalion, 501st Infantry
  - 2nd Battalion, 501st Infantry
  - 1st Battalion, 502nd Infantry
- 3rd Brigade, 101st Airborne Division (July–September 1968) comprising:
  - 1st Battalion, 502nd Infantry
  - 1st Battalion, 506th Infantry
  - 2nd Battalion, 506th Infantry
- 588th Engineer Battalion (July 1966-April 1967, May–November 1970)
- 7th Surgical Hospital (June 1966-April 1967)
- 12th Evacuation Hospital (September 1966-December 1970)
- 269th Aviation Battalion ( January 1967-April 1971) comprising:
  - 116th Assault Helicopter Company (September 1966-June 1970)
  - 188th Assault Helicopter Company
  - 242nd Assault Support Helicopter Company (November 1967-April 1971)

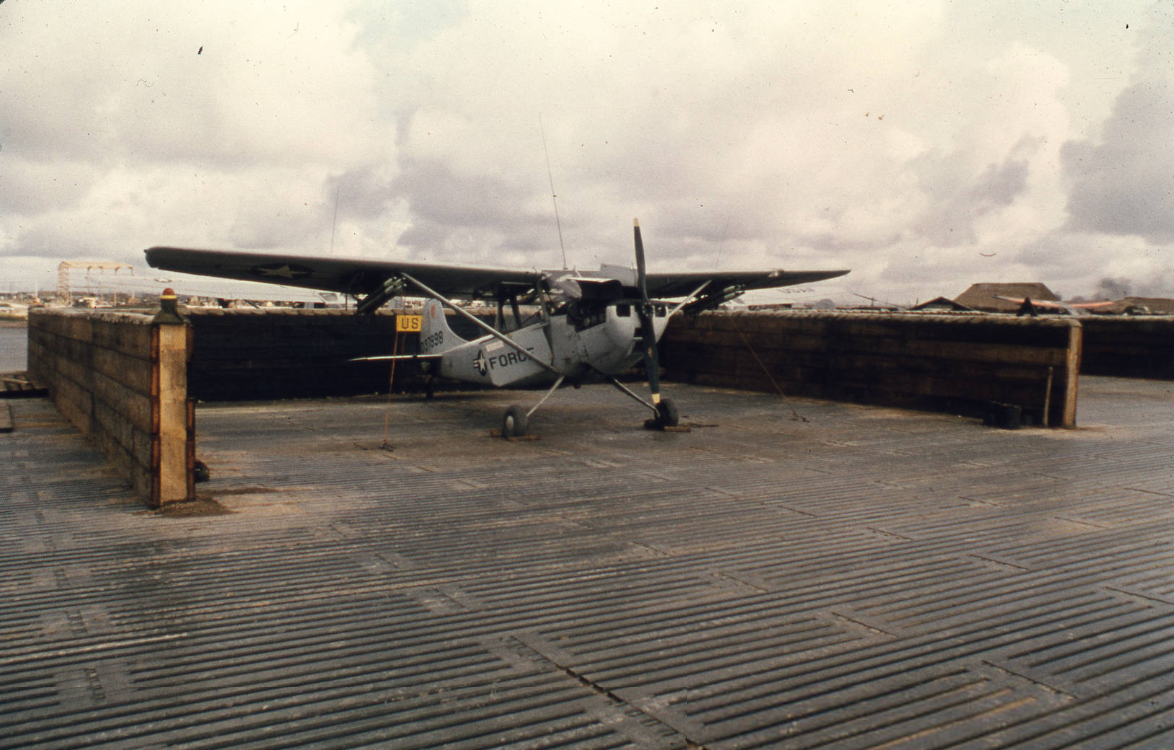
O-1 FAC in revetment at Cu Chi, 24 September 1967

From 1967 the 159th Medical Detachment (Helicopter Ambulance) with Bell UH-1D Hueys was deployed here.

The airfield was capable of accommodating de Havilland Canada C-7 Caribou and Fairchild C-123 Provider aircraft.

On 3 January 1969 a Vietcong bomb exploded in a messhall at the camp killing 15 Americans mostly from the 554th Engineer Battalion and two Vietnamese kitchen staff.

On 26 February 1969 PAVN sappers attacked the base destroying 9 Boeing CH-47A Chinook helicopters of the 242nd ASH Company.

=== 1970–1975 ===
Following the departure of the U.S. forces in 1972, Củ Chi became the base of the ARVN 25th Division.

As the People's Army of Vietnam (PAVN) forces closed in on Saigon in late April 1975, the camp was hit by PAVN artillery fire on 28 April and besieged the PAVN. 25th Division commander Major general Lý Tòng Bá ordered his forces to fight in place, but on the morning of 29 April after PAVN tanks broke through the defensive lines, order collapsed and Lý and his remaining forces attempted to flee the base.

== Current use ==
The base remains in use by the People's Army of Vietnam. The airfield is no longer used but is still visible on satellite images.
