= Dư Quốc Đống =

South Vietnamese Army general (1932–2008)

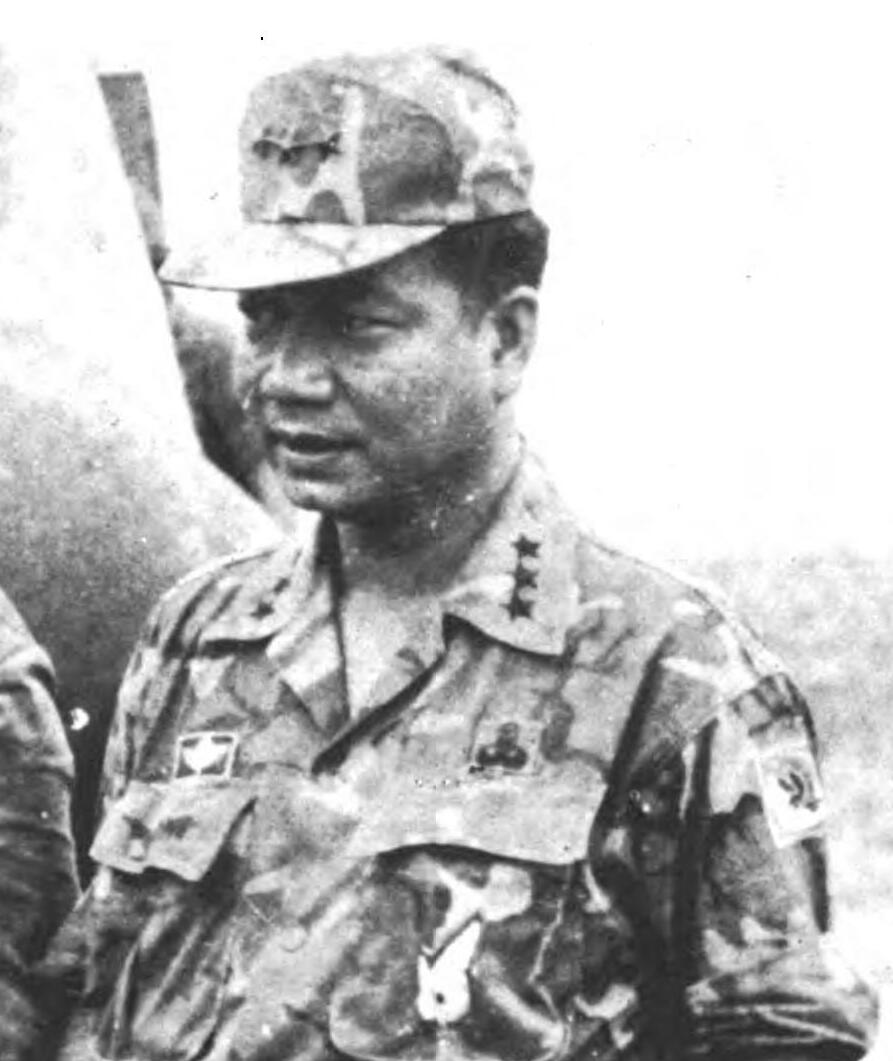
- Born: 1932
- Died: 22 April 2008
- Military career
- Allegiance: South Vietnam
- Branch: Army of the Republic of Vietnam
- Rank: Lieutenant General (Trung Tướng)
- Commands: Airborne Division (1965–1972); Capital Military District; III Corps (30 October 1974 – January 1975)

Dư Quốc Đống (1932 – 22 April 2008) was a Lieutenant general in the South Vietnamese Army of the Republic of Vietnam (ARVN).

== Career ==
In 1965, Đống served as commander of the Airborne, which together with the Marines formed the South Vietnamese general reserve and had a significant political role to play in Saigon. Đống allied with General Nguyễn Văn Thiệu, while General Lê Nguyên Khang, commanding the Marines, was an ally of Đống's rival Air Vice Marshal Nguyễn Cao Kỳ. The general reserve troops represented the muscle of the Saigon-based Directory members and balanced power between the rival officer cliques.

In 1966, US advisers reported that Đống was highly resistant to American advice. Because of his close relationship with Thiệu, Joint General Staff chief General Cao Văn Viên, his nominal superior, was reluctant to discipline Đống and instead passed on American misgivings to Thiệu. Thiệu valued the support of Đống's Saigon-based paratroopers, but, to appease his American critics, apparently reprimanded Đống in private over his lackadaisical approach. The result was a supposed "changed attitude" in Đống, but by the end of the year the Airborne senior adviser, Col. James B. Bartholomees, again reported that Đống "was still not applying himself to his job."

In 1972 Thiệu moved both Đống and Khang out of their Divisions, transferring Đống to command the Capital Military District and Khang to a nebulous "special assistant" post under Viên on the Joint General Staff.

He served as the commander of III Corps, which oversaw the region of the country surrounding Saigon, from 30 October 1974 until January 1975, when he was replaced by Lieutenant General Nguyễn Văn Toàn.

== Awards ==
=== National Honours ===
- Grand Officer of the National Order of Vietnam

=== Foreign honours ===
- USA :
  - Silver Star Medal
