= Camp Lê Văn Duyệt =

French Army, Army of Republic of Vietnam and United States Army

- District 10, Saigon, Vietnam

Site information
- Type: Army Base
- Owner: People's Army of Vietnam

Location
- Coordinates: 10.777°N 106.676°E

Site history
- Built: 1860s
- In use: 1860s–present
- Battles/wars: Vietnam War

Camp Lê Văn Duyệt (also known as Capital Military District Headquarters, Capital Military Assistance Command or CMAC and Camp Goodman ) was a French Army, Army of the Republic of Vietnam and United States Army base located in District 10, Saigon, Vietnam. It remains in use today by the People's Army of Vietnam (PAVN).

== History ==
The base was originally built during the French colonial period as the Nouvelles Casernes d'Artillerie Coloniale (new barracks of the Colonial Artillery).

With the departure of the French from South Vietnam in 1954-6 the base was handed over to the Army of the Republic of Vietnam (ARVN) and named after Lê Văn Duyệt, an 18th-century military commander. The base was the headquarters of the Capital Military District (CMD) responsible for the defense of Saigon.

On 5 October 1963 CIA officer Lucien Conein met with General Dương Văn Minh at the base to discuss the planned coup against President Ngo Dinh Diem. In preparation for the coup one of the coup leaders General Tôn Thất Đính moved 20 tanks to the base to ensure that the coup supporters enjoyed overwhelming strength against forces loyal to Diem.

In 1964 the ARVN political warfare training center moved to the base but the facilities at the new location were so inadequate that they were moved to the Dalat Military Academy in 1966.

The ARVN 1st Airborne Battalion was headquartered at the base.

On the morning of 31 January 1968 at the start of the Tet Offensive, US II Field Force commander Lieutenant general Frederick C. Weyand directed his deputy, Major general Keith L. Ware, to establish a tactical command post at the base next to the CMD headquarters. Once operational, this headquarters known as Hurricane Forward would assume tactical control over all US units entering the Saigon–Gia Định Province zone.

On the morning of 5 May 1968 at the start of the May Offensive Weyand directed his deputy, Major general John H. Hay, to re-establish Hurricane Forward at the base to perform the same function as in the Tet Offensive.

== Capital Military Assistance Command (CMAC) ==
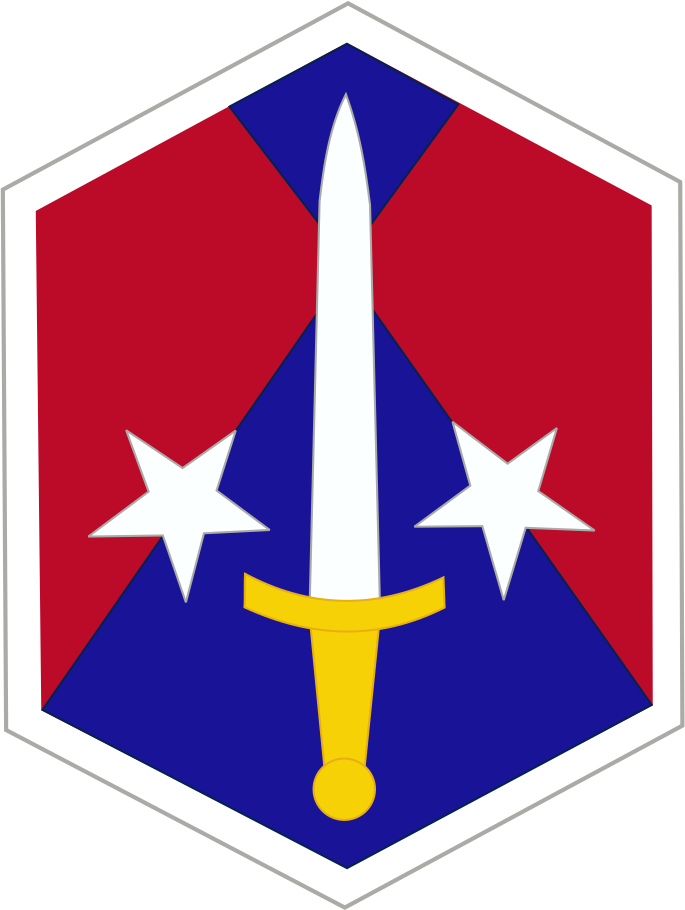
Capital Military Assistance Command SSI

On 27 June 1968 Weyand published orders establishing Headquarters, Capital Military Assistance Command (CMAC) (Provisional) at the base under the command of Hay, with an effective date of 4 June 1968. In this post, Hay exercised operational control over all US units and advisers in Saigon–Gia Định, with himself serving as adviser to General Nguyễn Văn Minh, the commander of the CMD and military governor of Saigon. Weyand assigned two US brigades, the 199th Infantry Brigade and the 2nd Brigade, 25th Infantry Division to CMAC control to protect Saigon against further Vietcong attacks.

The US 5th Special Forces Group's Camp Goodman was located within the camp until late 1968 when it was handed over to CMAC.

In late 1969 II Field Force commander Lieutenant general Julian Ewell transformed CMAC into an advisory organization for the CMD, and charged it with transferring local American sensor and ground radar installations to the South Vietnamese.

== Current use ==
The base remains in use by the PAVN as the headquarters of the Ho Chi Minh City Command (Vietnamese: Bộ Tư lệnh TP.HCM), which forms part of the 7th Military Region (Vietnam People's Army). The street address is 291 Hẻm 285 Cách Mạng Tháng Tám, Phường 12, Quận 10, Hồ Chí Minh, Vietnam.
