= Pleiku province =

Historic province of Vietnam

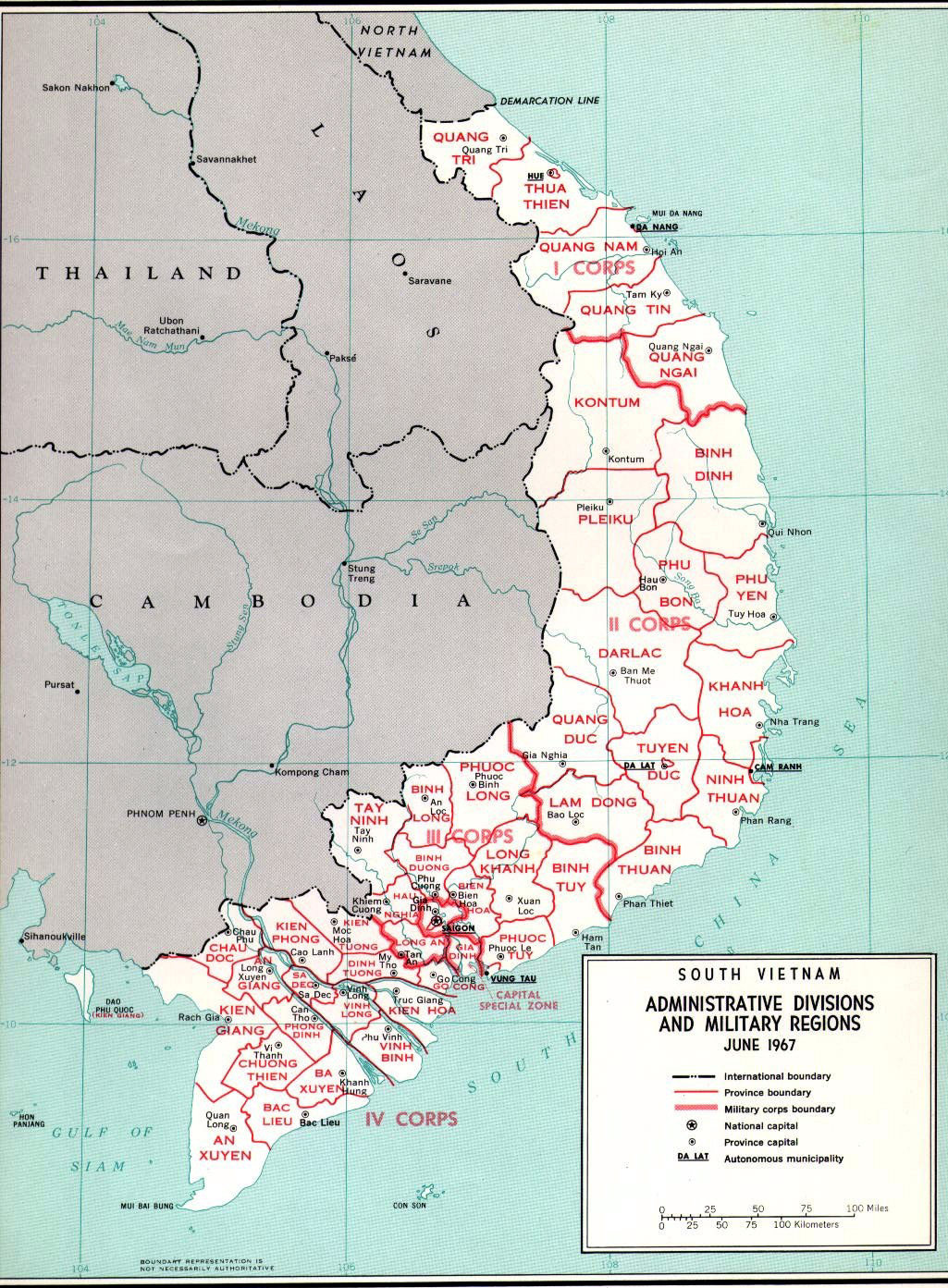
Administrative map of the Republic of Vietnam in 1967

Pleiku was a former province of the Annam (French protectorate), the State of Vietnam, then the Republic of Vietnam.

== History ==
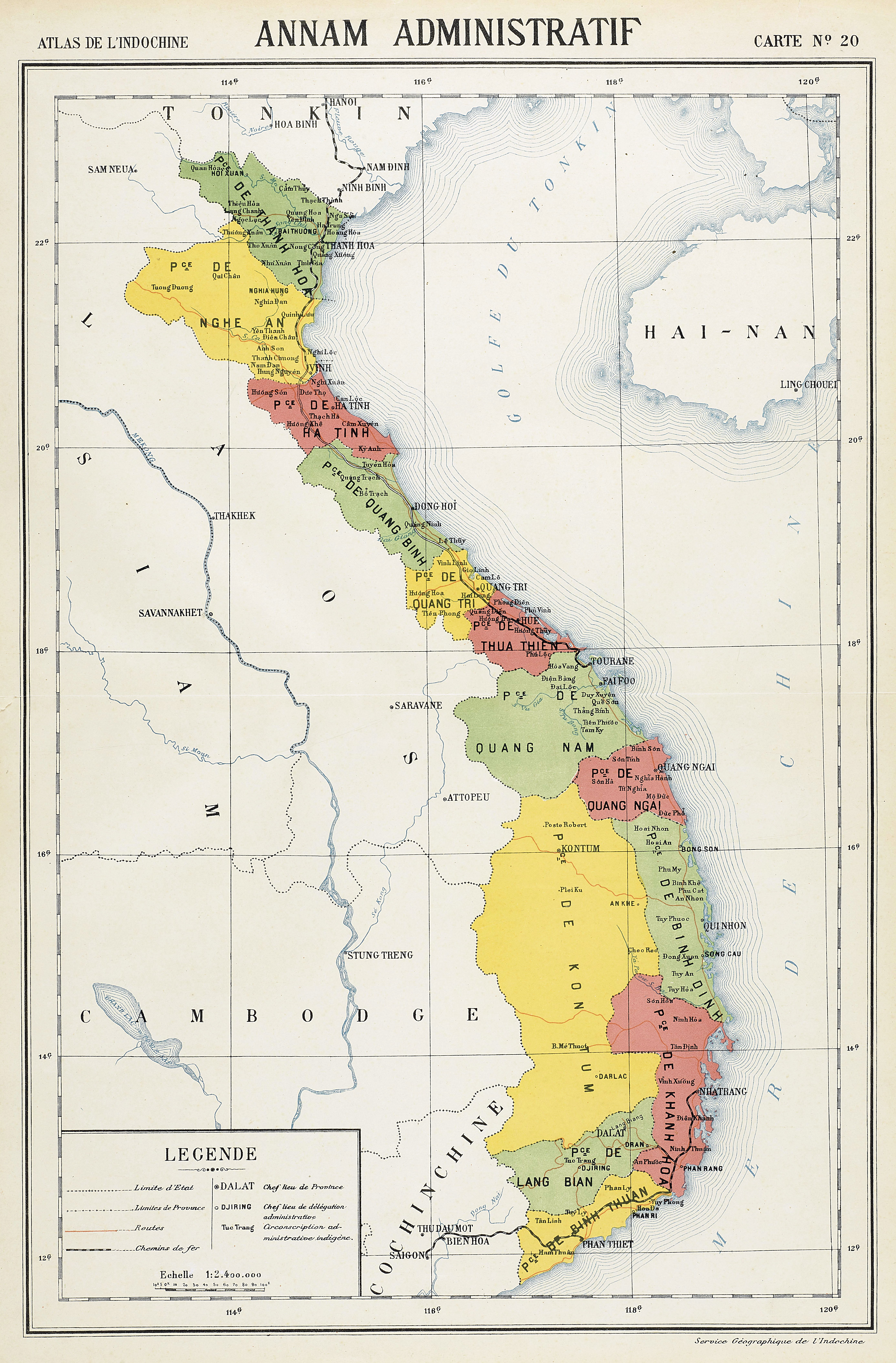
Administrative divisions of Annam 1920

During the reign of King Tự Đức (1847–1883), Pleiku and the mountainous regions west of Quảng Nam - Quảng Ngãi - Bình Định fell under the jurisdiction of Trấn Sơn Phòng (Protectorate of Mountainous Defense) of governor Nguyễn Tấn.

By 1907, the French established Kontum province within the Protectorate of Annam, encompassing the territories of Pleiku and Darlac. In 1923, Darlac was separated from Kontum, then in February 1929, in turn of Pleiku.

In April 1950, Pleiku and other provinces in the Central Highlands were transferred to the Domain of the Crown under the State of Vietnam.

During the Vietnam War, Pleiku province served as the headquarters for the Army of the Republic of Vietnam (ARVN) II Corps, the 2nd Ranger Group, and the 3rd Armored Cavalry Squadron (at Pleiku city); it also hosted the US 52nd Aviation Battalion (at Camp Holloway) and the US 4th Infantry Division (at Camp Enari).

Administrative units of Pleiku province
Districts (Quận)	Population (1965)	Number of communes (xã)
Lệ Trung		65
Lệ Thanh		34
Phú Nhơn		9
Total		108
