= Capital Military District =

Military region of the South Vietnamese Army

- SSI of the Capital Military District
- Active: 1959–1975
- Country: South Vietnam
- Branch: Army of the Republic of Vietnam
- Type: Corps
- Garrison/HQ: Saigon
- Engagements: Vietnam War: Tet Offensive; Fall of Saigon

Commanders
- Notable commanders: Lê Nguyên Khang; Nguyễn Văn Minh; Dư Quốc Đống; Chung Tấn Cang

Capital Military District (formerly the Capital Military Region) was a corps-level command of the Army of the Republic of Vietnam (ARVN), the army of the nation state of South Vietnam that existed from 1955 to 1975. It encompassed the capital Saigon and the five adjacent districts of Gia Định province.

The Capital Military District (CMD) had its headquarters at Camp Lê Văn Duyệt.

Prior to 7 June 1966 the CMD was called the Capital Military Region and technically was coequal with a corps tactical zone (CTZ). After that date it was a subordinate command of the III Corps commander.

MACV retained a separate advisory detachment for the CMD known as the Capital Military Assistance Command (CMAC).

In June 1965 the CMD controlled five battalions of troops, two used for security operations, two in reserve and one in training.
