= Lý Tòng Bá =

South Vietnamese general (1931–2015)

- Born: November 14, 1931; Long Xuyên, French Indochina
- Died: February 22, 2015 (aged 83); Las Vegas, Nevada
- Military career
- Allegiance: State of Vietnam; South Vietnam
- Branch: Vietnamese National Army; Army of the Republic of Vietnam
- Service years: 1950 – 25 October 1955 (Vietnamese National Army); 26 October 1955 – 30 April 1975 (Army of the Republic of Vietnam)
- Rank: Brigadier general
- Commands: Bình Dương sector Bình Định sector 23rd Division; Armor Branch; 25th Division
- Conflicts: Battle of Ap Bac; Battle of Kontum; Fall of Saigon

Lý Tòng Bá (14 November 1931, in Long Xuyên – 22 February 2015, in Las Vegas, Nevada) was a Brigadier general of the South Vietnamese Army of the Republic of Vietnam.

== Military career ==
Bá entered the Vietnamese National Army in the 1950s during the First Indochina War. He was trained in armor and rose in rank, reaching captain by the early 1960s.

In 1962 Bá commanded a mechanized company of M113 armored personnel carriers attached to the 7th Division based at Mỹ Tho. On 25 September 1962 Bá's unit of nine M113s took part in a multi-regiment operation against the Vietcong (VC) in the Plain of Reeds. Despite the advice of the US armored adviser that the terrain was unsuited for armor, Bá's unit was ordered to ordered to cross a canal and attack a group of 60 VC. After the lead unit had crossed they saw a group of 14 VC and Bá, decided to attack. While the armored adviser proposed a flank attack Bá's M113s charged straight ahead through the flooded paddies towards where the VC had last been seen. Suddenly VC appeared all around the M113s some firing automatic weapons and rifles and others running wildly in an attempt to evade the armored vehicles. As the M113s scattered the VC the ARVN soldiers on board fired from open roof hatches and with the mounted M2 Browning machine guns. The US advisor then convinced Bá to dismount the troops which was a mistake as they lost the advantage of manoeuvre and the troops were bogged down in knee-deep water. After an hour the troops remounted and the M113s advanced on the VC positions eventually forcing them to withdraw by mid-afternoon. ARVN units found more than 150 VC dead, captured 38 VC and seized 27 weapons, including an American .50-caliber machine gun and two Browning automatic rifles.

Bá's mechanized company was redesignated as the 4th Mechanized Rifle Squadron, 2nd Armored Cavalry Regiment. During the Battle of Ap Bac, Bá was ordered to rescue ARVN forces who had been cut off, but he refused to take orders directly from US advisers and was reluctant to move his M113s across the terrain and a canal. Senior US adviser John Paul Vann who was flying overhead became so frustrated with Bá that he threatened to have him shot. Bá's unit eventually approached the besieged forces in single file rather than spread out and suffered losses as the VC were able to engage each M113 individually with his unit eventually losing 14 killed.

In the early 1960s the ARVN Armor Force were regarded as an important factor in upholding or overthrowing any South Vietnamese government, having been used to suppress at least three coup attempts. President Ngô Đình Diệm acted to ensure the loyalty of his armor leaders. Only the most trustworthy armor officers were assigned to the greater Saigon area. Diệm also limited fuel allocations so that armored units could not reach Saigon and Bá had to telephone the Independence Palace frequently to report his location. Despite these precautions armored units joined the November 1963 South Vietnamese coup d'état and Diệm and his brother Ngô Đình Nhu would be executed in a 4th Squadron, 4th Cavalry M113.

In the September 1964 South Vietnamese coup attempt, rebel leaders Lt. Gen. Dương Văn Đức and Brig. Gen. Lâm Văn Phát ordered Lt. Col. Bá to attack Tan Son Nhut Air Base with his armored squadron, but Bá telephoned MACV headquarters instead to learn what America thought about the coup. When he found that MACV opposed the rebellion, he called off the assault.

In 1966 he served as chief of Bình Dương province. In 1968 he served as chief of Bình Định province.

On 15 January 1972 he was appointed as commander of the 23rd Division replacing Brigadier general Vo Van Canh.

During the Easter Offensive of 1972, he commanded the 23rd Division and together with Vann successfully defended Kontum against the People's Army of Vietnam (PAVN) attack. In 30 May afternoon, President Thiệu flew into Kontum City, praised the endurance and fighting spirit of all forces defending the city, and right there pinned the brigadier general star on Col. Bá, the defender of Kontum, for "special frontline merits".

A recipient of the French Croix de Guerre and the US Silver Star, Gen. Bá assumed command of the ARVN Armor Branch right after the Easter Offensive.

In 1975 he commanded the 25th Division responsible for defending the northwestern approaches to Saigon. As the PAVN forces closed in on Saigon in late April 1975, the 25th Division's Củ Chi Base Camp came under artillery fire on 28 April and then siege from the PAVN. Brigadier general Bá ordered his force to fight in place, but on the morning of 29 April after PAVN tanks broke through the defensive lines, order collapsed and Bá and his remaining forces attempted to flee the base.

== Later life ==
After initially evading capture he was eventually caught by the PAVN and sent to a reeducation camp for 12 years. He emigrated to the United States in 1990.

== Awards ==
- France :
  - Croix de guerre des théâtres d'opérations extérieures
- USA
  - Silver Star Medal
