= 554th Engineer Battalion (United States) =

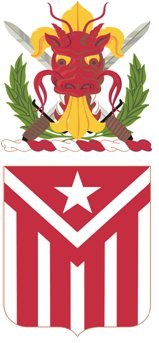
- 554th Engineer Battalion coat of arms
- Country: United States
- Branch: US Army Corps of Engineers
- Type: Engineer Training Battalion
- Garrison/HQ: Ft. Leonard Wood
- Motto: Straight Ahead

Commanders
- Current commander: LTC David B Cox

The 554th Engineer Battalion is an Engineer Battalion of the United States Army. It is currently based at Ft. Leonard Wood, Missouri where it trains Soldiers for the Engineer Branch. It is responsible for training the Horizontal skills course, Engineer Basic Officers Leader Course (EBOLC), Engineer Captains Career Course, and Warrant Officer Engineer Course

== History ==
=== 554th Engineer Battalion U.S. Army Vietnam ===
The U.S. Army 554th Engineer Battalion left Fort Knox, Kentucky, in 1967; in California it boarded a ship for Vietnam. It was based at Cu Chi, Vietnam, from 1967 to 1969 with some elements at Phu Loi. There were also other elements TDY where needed from time to time. The battalion completed their duties but had casualties from two separate sapper attacks at Cu Chi in 1969. Most of 554th later moved to Lai Khe in 1970 where it maintained QL-13 between Lai Khe and An Loc. Some elements of the 554th were based at Firebases along QL-13 also known as Thunder Road. Along with infantry and artillery units, B Company of the 554th Eng's based its operations at Firebase Thunder III, along with elements of other 554th Companies. The Battalion completed their duties but had casualties at Lai Khe, on QL-13 and Firebase Thunder III.

In late 1970 the entire 554th Engineer Battalion moved out of Lai Khe and moved up QL-20 into the south highlands. Most of the 554th was then based at Camp Smith at Bao Loc, while some elements of the 554th were based at Camp Fennell beyond Bao Loc (Towards Da Lat). However Company C of the 554th was based at Camp Brown at the bottom of the mountain pass about 26 miles from Bao Loc. The battalion maintained QL-20 from Camp Brown to the Camp Fennell area. Additionally the 554th's 10-ton and 5-ton trucks were utilized on supply convoys to Long Binh.

The 554th worked to maintain areas of the mountain pass road going to Bao loc. Also a major re-route of QL-20 was done just west of Camp Brown by the river. Company C's EM Platoon worked with dynamite and C4 to blast a section from the base of the mountain. This re-route alleviated re-occurring washouts of the road by the river in the monsoons. Later in 1971 Company C moved out of Camp Brown and built Camp Woodstock at the top of the mountain pass a few miles from Bao Loc. The battalion completed their duties but had some casualties in the QL-20 area in 1970–71. The unit deactivated from Vietnam in 1972.

== Lineage ==
- Constituted 5 May 1942 in the Army of the United States as the 354th Engineers
- Redesignated 1 August 1942 as the 354th Engineer General Service Regiment
- Activated 20 September 1942 at Camp Maxey, Texas
- Inactivated 6 November 1945 at Fort Belvoir, Virginia
- Headquarters, Headquarters and Service Company, and Companies A, B, and C redesignated 25 February 1954 as the 554th Engineer Battalion and allotted to the Regular Army (remainder of the regiment concurrently disbanded)
- Battalion activated 15 November 1954 at Fort Leonard Wood, Missouri
- Inactivated 26 March 1963 at Fort Leonard Wood, Missouri
- Activated 1 February 1966 at Fort Knox, Kentucky
- Inactivated 1 March 1972 at Fort Lewis, Washington
- Headquarters transferred 7 November 1986 to the United States Army Training and Doctrine Command and activated at Fort Belvoir, Virginia
- Location changed 1 October 1988 to Fort Leonard Wood, Missouri

== Campaign participation credit ==
=== World War II ===
- Northern France
- Rhineland
- Central Europe

=== Vietnam ===
- Counteroffensive, Phase II
- Counteroffensive, Phase III
- Tet Counteroffensive
- Counteroffensive, Phase IV
- Counteroffensive, Phase V
- Counteroffensive, Phase VI
- Tet 69/Counteroffensive
- Summer-Fall 1969
- Winter-Spring 1970
- Sanctuary Counteroffensive
- Counteroffensive, Phase VII
- Consolidation I
- Consolidation II

== Decorations ==
- Meritorious Unit Commendation (Army), Streamer embroidered VIETNAM 1967-1968
- Meritorious Unit Commendation (Army), Streamer embroidered VIETNAM 1968
- Republic of Vietnam Cross of Gallantry with Palm, Streamer embroidered VIETNAM 1967-1968
- Republic of Vietnam Cross of Gallantry with Palm, Streamer embroidered VIETNAM 1968-1970
- Republic of Vietnam Civil Action Honor Medal, First Class, Streamer embroidered VIETNAM 1967-1970
- Republic of Vietnam Civil Action Honor Medal, First Class, Streamer embroidered VIETNAM 1970-1971
