= 5th Division (Vietnam) =

- Active: 1965–present
- Allegiance: Vietnam
- Branch: National Liberation Front for South Vietnam (1965–1976); People's Army of Vietnam (1976–present)
- Type: Infantry
- Role: Guerrilla (1965–1976); Regular infantry (1976–present)
- Size: Division
- Part of: 7th Military Region
- Engagements: Vietnam War: Battle of Long Tan; Battle of Bien Hoa; Battle of Long Binh; Battle of Snuol; Battle of Loc Ninh; Battle of Svay Rieng

The 5th Infantry Division was a division of the Viet Cong during the Vietnam War and later became part of the People's Army of Vietnam.

== History ==
The division was formed on 23 October 1965 from the 4th "Đồng Nai" Regiment and the newly formed 5th Regiment, which was drawn from local forces. The division later comprised the 274th Regiment (Vietnamese: 4th "Đồng Nai" Regiment) and 275th Regiment (Vietnamese: "Cá Gô" 55 Regiment) plus supporting units.

The VC 5th Division's headquarters were located in northeast Phước Tuy, in the Mây Tào Mountains; the 274th Regiment's headquarters were located in the Hát Dịch area and the 275th Regiment's headquarters were located somewhere in the Mây Tào Mountains, generally known as the May Tao Secret Zone, although the precise locations are unknown. The division operated in the Bien Hoa, Đồng Nai, Phước Tuy and Long Khánh provinces. North Vietnamese regulars reïnforced the division during operations.

As part of the campaign against Saigon, the division was tasked with isolating the eastern provinces by interdicting the main roads and highways, including Highways 1 and 15 and provincial routes 2 and 23. It this role it proved a major challenge to the Army of the Republic of Vietnam, with the 275th Regiment successfully ambushing a Republic battalion near Binh Gia on 11 November 1965.

The PAVN claim that the Division's 4th and 5th Regiments attacked the U.S. base at Vung Tau on 12 March 1966 "killing 300 enemy and destroying 30 helicopters." No other sources confirm such an attack.

On 18 August 1966 the elements of the division participated in the Battle of Long Tan against Australian Army forces.

During the 1968 Tet Offensive the Division attacked Bien Hoa Air Base and Long Binh Post. The attacks were a failure and total PAVN/VC losses were 567 dead and 47 captured and 11 U.S. killed. Following the Tet Offensive the 174th Regiment was assigned to reinforce the division.

By 1971 the division was operating in Cambodia and PAVN command formed the corps-sized Group 301, comprising the 5th Division, the 7th Division, and 9th Division as well as the 28th Artillery Regiment and the 12th Anti-aircraft Machine Gun Battalion. The division fought in the Battle of Snuol in late May 1971.

During the Easter Offensive the division fought the Battle of Loc Ninh from 4-7 April 1972, capturing the town but suffering heavy casualties from U.S. airstrikes. The division then joined other PAVN forces fighting in the Battle of An Lộc.

From 27 March to 2 May 1974 the division's base area in Svay Rieng Province south of the Elephant's Foot (10.87°N 105.9°E) was attacked by the ARVN 25th Division and 7th Ranger Group in the Battle of Svay Rieng. The ARVN claimed PAVN losses of over 1,200 killed and 65 captured and the division's base area severely damaged, while ARVN losses were less than 100 killed.

In early 1975 in preparation for the 1975 Spring Offensive the PAVN command formed the 232nd Group comprising the division and the 3rd Division. In early April the division attacked ARVN outposts at Thủ Thừa and Bến Lức but were repulsed. In late April the division cut Route 4 near Bến Lức blocking the movement of ARVN units from the southwest towards Saigon. On 30 April the division advanced up Route 4 and attacked Tân An and Thủ Thừa forcing the surrender of the ARVN 22nd Division and 6th Ranger Group.

Presently, the 5th Division is under the 7th Military Region.

== Notable members ==
- Nguyen Hoa - First commanding officer.
- Le Xuan Luu - First political commissar
