= Joint General Staff =

- Flag of the Joint General Staff
- Active: 1955 – 29 April 1975
- Country: South Vietnam
- Allegiance: President of South Vietnam
- Type: High Command
- Role: Nominally oversee: Army of the Republic of Vietnam; Republic of Vietnam Air Force; Republic of Vietnam Navy; Marine Division; Airborne Division; Ranger Corps; Armor Corps; Airborne Ranger Group
- Part of: Republic of Vietnam Armed Forces
- Headquarters: JGS Compound, Tan Son Nhut
- Nickname: JGS
- Engagements: Vietnam War

Commanders
- Chief: Cao Văn Viên

The Joint General Staff (JGS) was a body of senior uniformed leaders in the South Vietnamese military which advised the Ministry of National Defence and the President of South Vietnam.

== Organisation ==
The JGS carried out administrative and planning functions for the entire Republic of Vietnam Armed Forces. Actually an Army of the Republic of Vietnam (ARVN) headquarters, it ran the ARVN's training and logistical system and directly controlled a number of support units in the Saigon area. As the highest South Vietnamese military headquarters, it also dealt directly with the theater-level American military headquarters in South Vietnam, Military Assistance Command, Vietnam (MACV). However, it possessed only limited authority over the Corps commanders and other major military elements.

The JGS itself consisted of five functional elements, supervised by a chief of staff. An Operations Directorate controlled five staff sections U-2, J-3, J-5, J-6 and J-7); a Personnel Directorate had three staff sections (the J- 1, Military Police and Adjutant General); a Logistics Directorate U-4) managed the technical service branches (ordnance, signal, engineers and others); and a Training Directorate and a General Political Warfare Department had smaller staffs. The last three also operated their own semi-autonomous agencies.

Associated with the JGS were semi-independent commands for the Republic of Vietnam Air Force, Republic of Vietnam Navy, Marine Division and Airborne Division. The Navy Command, after an abortive mutiny of its senior officers in April 1965 against Admiral Chung Tấn Cang, remained under the close scrutiny of the JGS chief, but the other three were more autonomous. Separate administrative commands also existed for Rangers, Armors, artillery, military police, Special Forces and Regional and Popular Forces, but they had no operational responsibilities. An inspector general's office also existed, but, lacking a network of subordinate offices, its authority was limited.

The Operations and Personnel Directorates were the heart of the JGS, providing guidance to the corps commands and monitoring their activities. Neither directorate had any command responsibilities, and both worked closely with American planners on organization, general campaign plans, and various administrative projects. The Operations Directorate also allocated the Marine and Airborne battalions to the corps commanders and served as the focal point for army intelligence efforts; however, it had little say over either the employment or the administration of the Airborne and Marine forces and little control over the many intelligence agencies operating outside of its immediate authority. In fact, the South Vietnamese government had no centralized intelligence system, and its information-gathering capabilities at the village and hamlet levels, where Viet Cong activity was most intense, were almost nonexistent.

The JGS indirectly supervised a number of ground combat forces based in the Saigon area. The six parachute battalions of the Airborne Command and the five infantry battalions of the Marine Corps Command constituted the South Vietnamese general reserve. These units were the only true regulars in the South Vietnamese ground forces, because they alone were not recruited from any fixed geographical locale. They also received better training, pay, food, quarters, medical care, and dependent benefits than the rest of the armed forces. When not in Saigon, they operated in multibattalion task forces, generally reinforcing local South Vietnamese units in difficulty. However, both airborne and marine units had a significant political role to play in Saigon with the Marines allied to Prime Minister Nguyễn Cao Kỳ and the Airborne allied to President Nguyễn Văn Thiệu.

The JGS honor guard battalion and a similar unit, the Capital Security Group, had the primary function of supporting the central military and political administration. The Security Group was a palace guard regiment composed of one bodyguard company, two infantry battalions, an armor detachment and a signal company; it provided security for government offices in Saigon and for the residences and families of important officials. Both units stood outside the American-supported South Vietnamese military force structure and MACV had no control over their deployment or activities.

The JGS was almost routinely excluded from command decisions which were often made by the President.

In postwar interviews conducted by the RAND Corporation with senior South Vietnamese military and civilian officials on the causes of the collapse of South Vietnam, the interviewees "agreed that the JGS was very weak, in concepts and in personnel, and did not become any stronger when the Americans left. Its chief, often described as very "passive" remained in place; the Corps commanders directly responsible to Thiệu, retained control over their fiefdoms while they tried to defend them against the enemy; Thiệu bypassed the JGS; and no planning staff worth the name generated any doctrines or strategies for the conduct of the war."

== Commanders ==
See Chief of the Joint General Staff (South Vietnam).

== History ==
The JGS ceased to function on 29 April 1975 during the Fall of Saigon.
