= 320th Division (Vietnam) =

- Active: 1951-present
- Allegiance: Vietnam
- Branch: Vietnam People's Army
- Type: Infantry
- Size: Division
- Nickname: Đồng Bằng (Delta)
- Engagements: First Indochina War: Battle of the Day River; Operation Bretagne; Operation Mouette; Operation Castor; Vietnam War: Operation Kentucky; Napoleon/Saline; Battle of Dai Do; Operation Lancaster II; Battle of Khe Sanh; Lam Son 719; 1972 Easter Offensive; Battle of Kontum; Second Quảng Trị; 1975 spring offensive; Ban Me Thuot; Fall of Saigon; Cambodian-Vietnamese War

Commanders
- Notable commanders: MG Văn Tiến Dũng; COL Nguyễn Kim Tuấn; COL Nguyễn Sùng Lãm

The 320th Division or Đồng Bằng Division (Vietnamese: Sư đoàn Đồng Bằng) is a division of the People's Army of Vietnam (PAVN), first formed in January 1951 from independent regiments in the Red River Delta. It was one of the six original regular divisions of the Viet Minh.

== First Indochina War ==
The 320th Infantry Division was first formed in January 1951 from three independent regiments (48th, 52nd, and 64th) of the Interzone 3 in the Red River Delta. The division first commander cum commissar was Major general Văn Tiến Dũng. It was one of the six original regular divisions of the Viet Minh.

In early August the French gained intelligence of Gen. Giáp's plan for his 1953-1954 offensive. In the first phase, the 320th Division would infiltrate north, joining up with the 42nd Independent Regiment behind the De Lattre Line. French forces from Cochinchina and Annam were sent northwards to interdict this.

Gen. Navarre then launched the Operation Mouette on 15 October 1953, with the aim "to fix and destroy a major element of the Regular Force (Chủ Lực) before Gen. Giáp could deploy it." The route for the Viet Minh between Thanh Hóa province and the Red River Delta contained a crossroads at Lai Cac which was targeted by the operation. Seven Mobile Groups (Groupes Mobiles) were deployed with river and amphibious units; tank units (largely the M24 Chaffee); half-tracks and paratroopers at designated landing sites, after counter-intelligence misled the Viet Minh into defending the wrong locations. GM 2 and GM 3 took Lai Cac and established a camp. The night of 18 October saw heavy counterattacks, which the French resisted. The 13th Foreign Legion Demi-Brigade held out all night against one Viet Minh battalion. This initial action was followed by two weeks of probing by GM 4 and paratrooper units. These columns fought major engagements in the surrounding countryside against the Division, particularly on 2 November. The French withdrew overnight on 6–7 November. The French claimed over 1,000 Viet Minh killed and 2,500 wounded, while 182 were captured, along with "500 infantry weapons, plus 100 bazookas and recoilless guns and 3,000 mines. French losses totalled 113 killed, 505 wounded and 151 missing.

The French further claimed that the 320th were put out of action for at least two months. Conversely, the Viet Minh claimed to have destroyed seven tanks/armored vehicles and put thousands troops of the French out of action.

A infantry company of the Division's 48th Regiment and the 910th Battalion of the 148th Regiment, 316th Division were stationed at Điện Biên Phủ when the French launched Operation Castor, however after some small skirmishes the Viet Minh abandoned the valley rather than engaging the French paratroops.

In late December 1953, Gen. Giáp ordered the Division to infiltrate into the Red River Delta and assist Viet Minh local regiments to increase the pressure on the French in this region while he concentrated his forces for the Battle of Dien Bien Phu.

== Vietnam War ==
In August 1965, the PAVN General Staff ordered the Division to split into 320A Division and 320B Division. The 320A Division was tasked with direct mobile combat operations on the battlefields. The 320B Division was responsible for training reinforcements to replenish forces on the South.

On 1 November 1967, the Marines launched Operation Kentucky as part of the continuing operations to secure the Vietnamese Demilitarized Zone (DMZ) around Con Thien. The operation concluded on 28 February 1969, the Division and 324th Division lost a total of 3,839 killed and 117 captured while the Marines lost 520 killed.

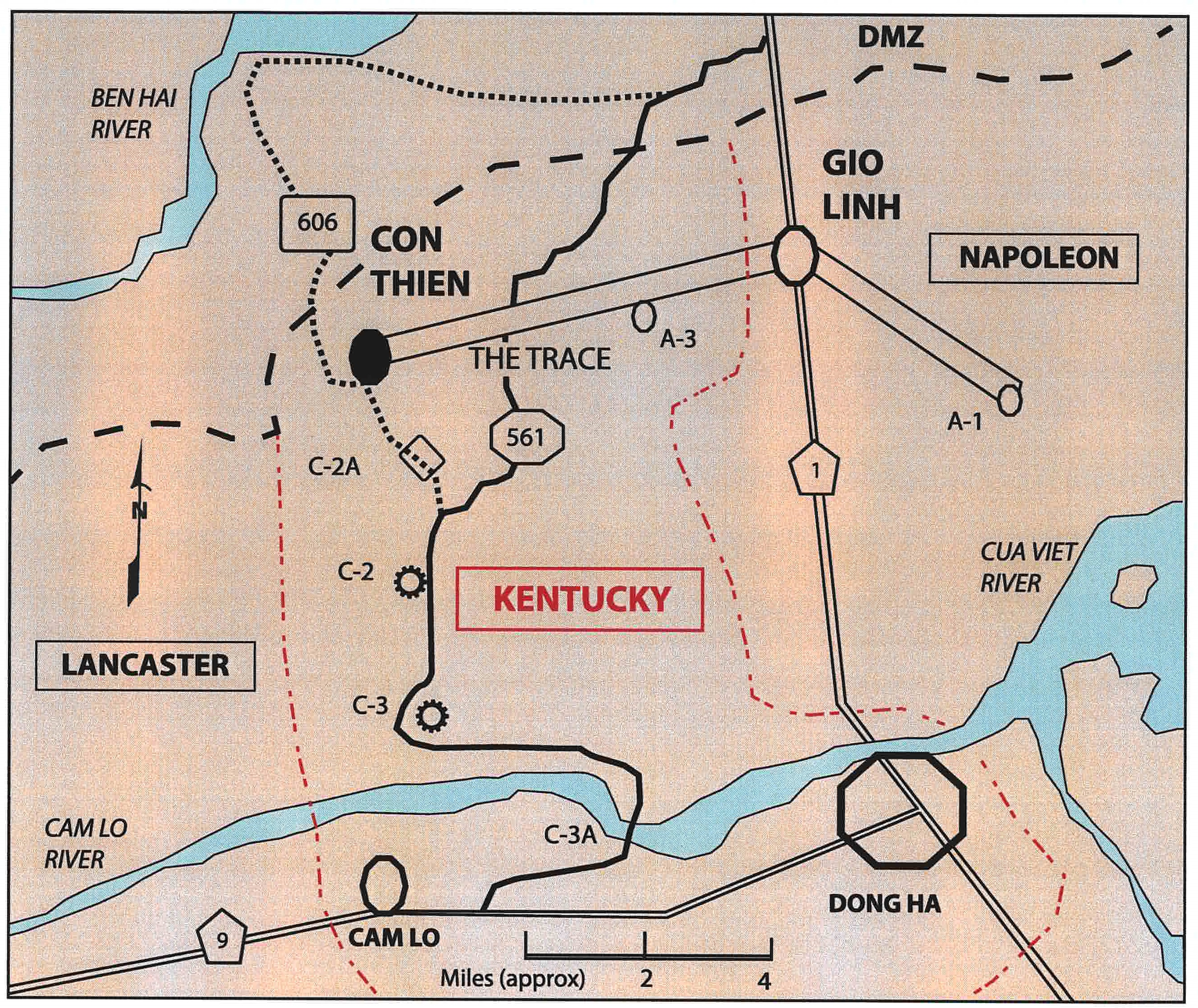
Kentucky, Napoleon and Lancaster areas of operation

The Division played a supporting role in the Battle of Khe Sanh, largely tasked with keeping Route 9 from Ca Lu to the Khe Sanh Combat Base closed. On 24 January 1968 elements of the 320th ambushed a Marine convoy between Dong Ha and Camp Carroll and then ambushed the relief force from the 2nd Battalion 9th Marines killing nine Marines. The subsequent Marine clearing operation, including the "Battle of Mike's Hill", lasted until 29 January and resulted in 21 Marines killed and 130 PAVN killed and six captured.

In early March 1968 following an action at Mai Xa Thi, prisoners revealed that the Division was moving into the Cửa Việt region to replace the 803rd Regiment which was moving further south into Thừa Thiên province.

On 29 April the Division attacked An Binh, north of Đông Hà, this drew two battalions of the Army of the Republic of Vietnam (ARVN) 2nd Regiment, 1st Division into a running battle and the 1st Battalion 9th Marines was sent into support the ARVN resulting in a 7 hour long battle that left 11 Marines, 17 ARVN and over 150 PAVN dead. The following day the 3rd Battalion 9th Marines arrived to support the Marine/ARVN force and was ambushed north of Cam Vu, 20 Marines and 41 PAVN were killed. Also on 30 April, a PAVN unit opened fire on a United States Navy Clearwater patrol from entrenched positions near Dai Do, 2.5 km northeast of Đông Hà. It was later discovered that four PAVN Battalions including the 48th and 56th from the Division had established themselves at Dai Do. The Battle of Dai Do lasted until 3 May and resulted in 81 Marines and over 600 PAVN killed. The Division engaged U.S. and ARVN forces elsewhere around Đông Hà from 4–6 April, on the evening of 6 April the 2nd Brigade 1st Cavalry Division was deployed into Tru Kinh and launched Operation Concordia Square. On 9 April the 1st Battalion, 5th Cavalry Regiment was ambushed by a division unit resulting in 16 U.S. dead for the loss of 80 PAVN. On 10 April a night attack north of Nhi Ha was broken up by air, artillery and naval support, 159 PAVN were killed. After this the Division broke into small groups and was moving back towards the DMZ, from 9–17 May the 2nd Brigade reported killing 349 PAVN for the loss of 28 killed.

While it seemed that the Division had abandoned their attempts to take Đông Hà this was just a temporary lull. On 22 May a unit from the Division ran into a company from 3rd Battalion 3rd Marines between Con Thien and Gio Linh and was caught in the open by Marine artillery and air support. East of Con Thien the 1st Battalion 4th Marines encountered another PAVN unit setting off a two-day battle as the PAVN tried to escape back through the DMZ resulting in 23 Marines and 225 PAVN killed. On 25 May in actions at Dai Do and Nhi Ha 350 PAVN were killed. In two actions at Tru Kinh on 26 May over 56 PAVN were killed for the loss of 10 Marines, while the ARVN killed 110 PAVN north of Thuong Nghia. On 27 April the Marines killed 28 PAVN and by 30 May the Division was attempting to escape through the Marine and ARVN cordon. Total PAVN losses in the second Battle of Đông Hà were over 1,000 killed.

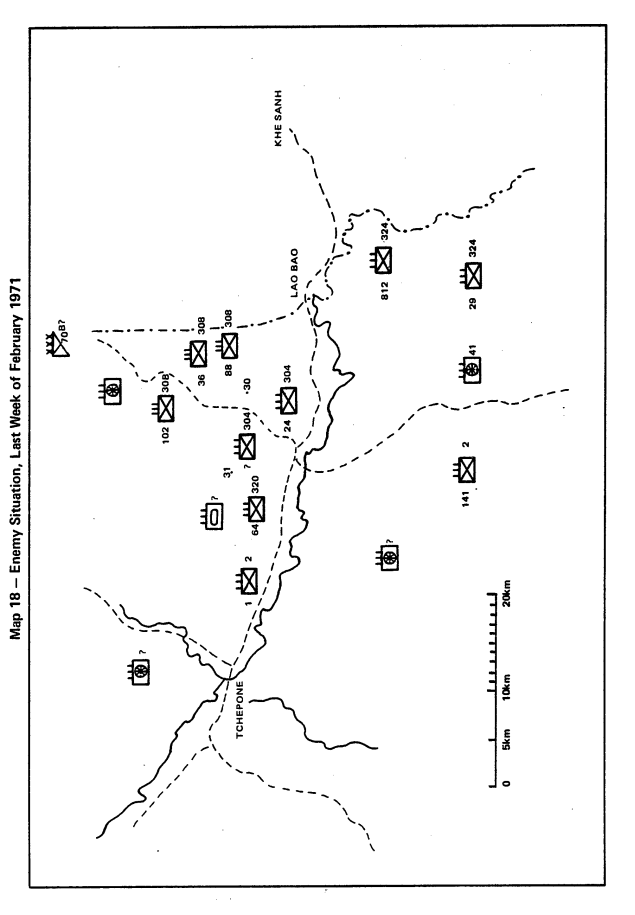
Lam Son 719 - PAVN situation in late February 1971

On 12 August 1968, a deserter from the 64th Regiment revealed that the Division had once again crossed the DMZ and was moving to positions near Cam Lo. In response to this the 3rd Marines deployed north of the Cam Lo River on 13 August and engaged the 8th Battalion of the 64th Regiment, killing 43. The operation continued until 26 October resulting in over 1,500 PAVN killed for the loss of less than 200 Marines.

In early 1970, the 320B Division was converted from a training division to a mobile division subordinate to the PAVN High Command.

In 1971, the Division (320A), together with the 304th and 308th Divisions formed part of the PAVN B-70 Corps based in southern Laos. The entire B-70 Corps opposed ARVN forces during Operation Lam Son 719. On 25 February, with heavy artillery and attached tanks support, the Division's 64th Regiment overrun FSB 31 of the ARVN 3rd Airborne Brigade, capturing its commander along with his staff. By 19 March, the 64th Regiment was operating east of Ban Dong/A Luoi (16.635°N 106.430°E) in an attempt to prevent ARVN withdrawal along Route 9.

In early 1972, the Division together with the independent 24B regiment were sent to reinforce the Central Highlands Front (B3 Front).

During the Easter Offensive of 1972 the Division was involved in the Battle of Kontum attacking the ARVN fire support bases between Dak To and Kontum under Col. Nguyễn Kim Tuấn, while its sibling - the 320B Division took part in the Second Battle of Quảng Trị under Col. Nguyễn Sùng Lãm.

During the War of the flags in 1973, both the 320A and 320B divisions joined the North Vietnam's efforts to maximize the territory under their control before the Paris Peace Accords came into effect on 28 January 1973. During 20 - 28 January, the 320A Division and 10th Division attacked to tie down ARVN defenders in Kontum province. The 320A captured Đức Cơ Camp on 21 January, while the 10th forced the ARVN Rangers to withdraw from Polei Krong on 28 January. From 25 to 31 January, the 320B Division coordinated with the 101st Regiment (101E) of 325th Division in the Battle of Cửa Việt in Quảng Trị province, and recaptured Cửa Việt Base on the final day.

On 24 October 1973, the 320B Division joined with the 380th, 312th Divisions, the 45th Artillery Brigade, the 299th Combat Engineer Brigade, the 202nd Tank Brigade, and the 367th Anti-aircraft Division to form the PAVN 1st Corps under commander Maj. Gen. Lê Trọng Tấn and commissar Maj. Gen. Lê Quang Hòa.

During the Battle of Ban Me Thuot on 8 March 1975 the Division captured Chư Sê and Thuan Man northeast of Ban Me Thuot cutting Highway 14. On the night of 16 March the Division was ordered to pursue the ARVN and civilians from the Central Highlands who were withdrawing down Highway 7 towards the coast and by the next day the Division's 64th Regiment had cut Highway 7 at Cheo Reo, blocking the retreat in what became known as the "Highway of Tears".

On 29 March 1975 the PAVN formed 3rd Corps comprising the 10th, 316th and 320th Divisions, the 675th Artillery Regiment, the 312th Anti-aircraft Regiment, 198th Sapper Regiment, 273rd Tank Regiment, 545th Engineer Regiment and the 29th Signal Regiment under the command of Major General Vũ Lăng. The Division then proceeded down Highway 7 into Phú Yên Province, capturing Tuy Hòa on 1 April. The Division then went back up Highway 7 and then down Highway 14. The Division then attacked the ARVN 25th Division base at Dong Du northwest of Saigon.

As part of the 3rd Corps, the Division participated in the Cambodian–Vietnamese War.

== Present day ==
As of 2026, the 320A Division retains its original designation as the 320th Division and remains part of the PAVN’s 34th Corps. The 320B Division was redesignated as the 390th Division in May 1979 and remains part of the PAVN’s 12th Corps.
