= 304th Division (Vietnam) =

304th Infantry Division
- Founded: 1950
- Allegiance: Vietnam
- Branch: People's Army of Vietnam
- Type: Infantry
- Role: Mechanized infantry
- Size: Division
- Part of: 2nd Military Region
- Garrison/HQ: Vĩnh Phúc, Vietnam
- Nickname: "Vinh Quang" (Glorious)
- Engagements: First Indochina War; Battle of Hòa Bình; Operation Bretagne; Battle of Dien Bien Phu; Vietnam War; Battle of Khe Sanh; Battle of Lang Vei; First Battle of Quảng Trị; 1975 Spring Offensive; Hue–Da Nang Campaign

Commanders
- Notable commanders: CG Hoàng Minh Thảo; CG Trần Văn Quang; Hoàng Sâm; LTG Vũ Nam Long

The 304 Division is an infantry division of the People's Army of Vietnam (PAVN). It was established in January 1950 at Thanh Hoa.

== First Indochina War ==
In late December 1953 seven battalions from the Division's 66th Regiment and the 101st Regiment, 325th Infantry Division moving from Vinh attacked isolated French outposts in the Annamite Range in Annam and Central Laos.

On 5 January 1954 General Võ Nguyên Giáp ordered the Division's 57th Regiment to move from Phú Thọ to Điện Biên Phủ and after a 10-day, 200 miles (320 km) march, by 23–24 January they were in position in the south of the valley. 57th Regiment's main role during the Battle of Dien Bien Phu was to isolate the French garrison at Strongpoint Isabelle to the south of the main position in the valley. In late April following the heavy losses in the previous month's fighting, General Giáp ordered the Division's 9th Regiment to Điện Biên Phủ as reinforcements. Total estimated losses among the division at Điện Biên Phủ are 490 killed.

== Vietnam War ==
One of its regiments took part in the November 14–18, 1965 Battle of Ia Drang.

In December 1967, US Intelligence reported that the division had crossed over from Laos and had taken up positions southwest of Khe Sanh Combat Base. On 21 January 1968 a battalion of the division attacked Khe Sanh, which was defended by local militia and a Marine Combined Action unit, the division suffered at least 123 killed before the defending forces withdrew to the Combat Base.

At dawn on 21 January the Division's 66th Regiment attacked Khe Sanh village, seat of Hướng Hóa District. The village was defended by 160 local Bru troops, plus 15 American advisers. A platoon from Company D, 1st Battalion, 26th Marines was sent from the base but was withdrawn in the face of the superior PAVN forces. Reinforcements from the ARVN 256th Regional Force (RF) company were dispatched aboard nine UH-1 helicopters of the 282nd Assault Helicopter Company, but they were landed near the abandoned French fort/former FOB-3 which was occupied by the PAVN who killed many of the RF troops and four Americans, including Lieutenant colonel Joseph Seymoe the deputy adviser for Quang Tri Province and forcing the remaining helicopters to abandon the mission. On the morning of 22 January the U.S./ARVN abandoned the village.

On the night of 6/7 February, the 22nd Infantry Regiment (attached to the division) and the 101st Regiment, 325th Division supported by 12 PT-76 lights tanks of the 203rd Armored Regiment overran the US special forces camp at Lang Vei killing 316 of the camp's defenders including seven Americans for the loss of 90 PAVN killed and seven tanks destroyed.

On the night of 29 February, the 9th Regiment of the division launched 3 attacks on the eastern perimeter of the Combat Base, but were beaten back each time by US firepower. These attacks marked the closest use of B-52 bombers to the Combat Base perimeter with base commander Colonel David E. Lownds reporting, "this was the only time that the kids on the lines told me...that they actually saw bodies being thrown into the air." The diary of one PAVN soldier killed in the battle reflected that while moving southward under the pressure of U.S. air power to replace casualties in the division, 300 men had deserted rather than face the feared B-52. The division's official history acknowledges that one of its battalions was so devastated by a B-52 strike that subsequent desertions and self-inflicted wounds to avoid combat caused the PAVN leadership to doubt that the battalion would be of any further use at Khe Sanh. By March the 304th was reported to have withdrawn into North Vietnam to re-equip.

On 4 April, the 1st Battalion 9th Marines attacked the 66th Regiment on Hill 471 south of the Combat Base, with the U.S. reporting 16 PAVN killed for the loss of 10 marines. The following morning the 66th Regiment counter-attacked, losing 140 killed and five captured while the Marines lost only one killed.

On 14 May 1968, units of the division attacked a supply convoy on Route 9, the 2nd Battalion 3rd Marines pursued the attackers as they withdrew from the ambush site, killing 74 PAVN for the loss of seven Marines. On 17 May, a patrol from the 2nd Battalion 1st Marines was ambushed by units of the division west of Khe Sanh, the Marines called in artillery and air strikes and then overran the ambush positions suffering six dead, while the division lost 52 killed. On the same days units of the division engaged the 3rd Battalion 4th Marines west of Khe Sanh on Hills 552 and 689, the division were lost 50 dead and four prisoners. On the night of 18–19 May 2/1 Marines engaged a Battalion from the 304th on Route 9 east of Khe Sanh, with the division losing 113 killed and eight Marines were killed.

In October 1970, the PAVN command formed the PAVN B-70 Corps comprising the division, together with the 308th and 320th Divisions based in southern Laos.

In 1971 the B-70 Corps and ancillary units participated in repulsing Operation Lam Son 719. In late February a company of the ARVN 3rd Airborne Battalion operating south of Fire Support Base 31 (16.715°N 106.426°E) received a Chieu Hoi, a sergeant from the Division's 24B Regiment. He revealed that the division had been operating the area since 9 February. At 11:00 on 25 February the PAVN deluged FSB 31 with artillery fire and then at 13:00 the 24B Regiment launched an armored/infantry assault. Airstrikes were called in and destroyed several PAVN tanks on the southern perimeter of the base. At 15:20 20 tanks supported by infantry attacked the northwest and east of the base. At this time a United States Air Force F-4 Phantom jet was shot down in the area and the Forward air control (FAC) aircraft coordinating fire support for FSB 31 left the area of the battle to direct a rescue effort for the downed aircraft crew. Forty minutes later, despite artillery support from other firebases the PAVN captured the base capturing or killing 155 ARVN including the commanders of the 3rd Airborne Brigade, which had its headquarters at FSB, and the commander of the 3rd Artillery Battalion and six 105 mm howitzers. The 24B Regiment lost an estimated 250 killed and 11 PT-76s and T-54s destroyed. By the 19 March the 24B Regiment was operating east of Ban Dong/A Luoi (16.635°N 106.430°E) in an attempt to prevent ARVN withdrawal along Route 9.

On 30 March 1972, the division took part in the First Battle of Quảng Trị, the opening battle of the Easter Offensive. On 2 April the Division's 24th Regiment forced the surrender of the entire ARVN 56th Regiment, 3rd Division at Camp Carroll. Also on the 2nd the Division's 66th Regiment began attacking 14th Marine Brigade at Mai Loc Camp forcing their withdrawal. At 06:30 on 27 April the division attacked the 147th Marine Brigade at Ái Tử Combat Base from the southwest, two attacks were repulsed but the base's ammunition dump was destroyed by artillery fire. On 28 April the ARVN 20th Tank Battalion was withdrawn from Đông Hà to support the base at Ái Tử, the ARVN 57th Regiment, 3rd Division fearing they were being abandoned, panicked and deserted their positions, leading to the collapse of the ARVN defensive line on the Cua Viet River. The VNMC 7th Battalion was sent to Ái Tử to help defend the base. At 02:00 on 29 April the division attacked the ARVN positions north and south of the base and the ARVN defenses began to crumble, by midday on 30 April, the 3rd Division commander ordered a withdrawal from Ái Tử to a defensive line along the south of the Thạch Hãn River and the withdrawal was completed late that day.

On 17 May 1974 PAVN 2nd Corps was formed comprising the division, the 324B and 325C Divisions, the 673rd Air Defense Division, the 164th Artillery Brigade, the 203rd tank Brigade, the 219th Engineer Brigade and the 463rd Signal Regiment under the command of Major General Hoàng Văn Thái.

On 29 July 1974 the Division's 66th Regiment participated in the Battle of Thượng Đức. The initial assault was repulsed but on 6 August the 66th Regiment launched a renewed assault and by the next day the Ranger forces defending the area began to withdraw. The PAVN claim to have killed or captured 1,600 ARVN and shot down 13 aircraft in the fighting up to 7 August. However they admit that the fighting at Thượng Đức had caused the 24th and 66th Regiments to suffer "a considerable erosion of their strength".

In 1975 as part of the Hue-Da Nang Campaign the division was moved to the southwest of Danang and by 26 March the Division's 9th Regiment was located northwest of Danang, while the rest of the division and the 711th Division encircled Danang from the south and the 324B and 325C Divisions which had earlier captured Huế advanced from the north and west. By the afternoon of 29 March the 2nd Corps had penetrated the South Vietnamese defences and entered the city. By April 26, the 304th and 325C were attacking Route 15, the last overland link between Saigon and Vung Tau.

From 27–28 April the division fought the 468th Marine Brigade supported by the 318th Armored Regiment for control of Nuoc Trong. The 66th Regiment, the 203rd Tank Brigade an anti-aircraft battalion and an engineer battalion formed 2nd Corps' deep penetration unit. On 30 April this deep penetration unit seized the Independence Palace, ending the war.

== Present day ==
304th Division was a part of the PAVN 2nd Corps until it was transferred to 2nd Military Region in 2023.
