= 711th Division =

711th Division may refer to:

- 711th Infantry Division (Wehrmacht), Germany
- 711th Division (Vietnam)

== See also ==
- List of military divisions by number
