= Second Battle of Quảng Trị =

Part of the Vietnam War (1972)

- Part of the Easter Offensive in the Vietnam War
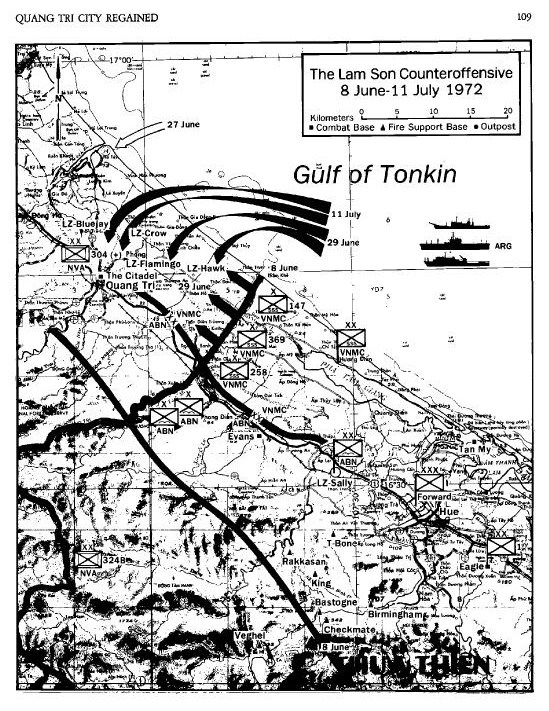
- Map of the initial phase of Operation Lam Sơn 72
Date	28 June – 16 September 1972
Location	16°44′N 106°58′E; Quảng Trị Province, South Vietnam
Result	South Vietnamese and U.S. victory

Belligerents
North Vietnam	South Vietnam; United States

Commanders and leaders
MG Trần Quý Hai (front commander); LTG Song Hào (front commissar)	(South Vietnam) LTG Ngô Quang Trưởng (United States) Frederick C. Weyand

Units involved
325th Division; 320th Division; 304th Division; 308th Division; Quảng Trị Province Command: 3rd infantry battalion of Local Force; 8th infantry battalion of Local Force	(South Vietnam); Marine Division; Airborne Division; Air Force Supported by: (United States) Air Force (United States) Navy

Strength
14,000	(South Vietnam) 30,000 (United States) U.S. Air Force and Navy support

Casualties and losses
North Vietnamese claim 10,000 casualties (including 4,000 killed); South Vietnamese claim 8,135 killed	(South Vietnam) Marine Division: 977 killed (South Vietnam) Airborne division: heavy (United States) ~20 killed North Vietnamese claim 7,756 killed

The Second Battle of Quảng Trị (Vietnamese: Trận Thành cổ Quảng Trị; also called Operation Lam Sơn 72) was a battle in the Easter Offensive beginning on 28 June 1972 and lasting 81 days until 16 September 1972, when the South Vietnamese army (ARVN) defeated the North Vietnamese army (PAVN), leading to the ARVN recapturing Quảng Trị Province south of the Thạch Hãn River. This was the longest and fiercest battle in the Vietnam War, where South Vietnam played the main role while the U.S. only provided fire support for its ally.

== Background ==
During the initial phase of the Easter Offensive, the PAVN passed the Demilitarized Zone and quickly captured Quảng Trị in the First Battle of Quảng Trị (30 March – 2 May 1972) and overran all of Quảng Trị Province. The ARVN regrouped forming a defensive line along the Mỹ Chánh River northwest of Huế and, together with U.S. support, the Battle of the Mỹ Chánh Line halted the PAVN offensive by 26 June.

== Planning ==
On 14 June, I Corps commander, Lieutenant general Ngô Quang Trưởng briefed President Nguyễn Văn Thiệu and Joint General Staff chairman General Cao Văn Viên on his planned counterattack to retake Quảng Trị Province from the PAVN. Thiệu was not convinced, preferring a smaller-scale operation. Trưởng finally convinced Thiệu, emphasizing that such an effort would be possible "employing the superior firepower of our American ally." Thiệu finally approved the concept and Operation Lam Sơn 72 was launched on 28 June.

The probing attacks in June tested PAVN strength and allowed for the establishment of advance positions ahead of the launch of Trưởng's operation to recapture Quảng Trị Province. The operational plan called for the Airborne (RVNAD) and Marine (RVNMC) Divisions to advance abreast to the northwest to the Thạch Hãn River. The Airborne Division would deploy to the west from the foothills to Highway 1, while the Marine Division would deploy to the east from Highway 1 to the coast. Quảng Trị City would be in the Airborne Division's operational area, but the plan called for the city to be bypassed so as to concentrate on the destruction of PAVN forces. As a diversion the U.S. 9th Marine Amphibious Brigade (9th MAB) would conduct a feint amphibious assault against the mouth of the Thạch Hãn River in Cửa Việt.

== Battle ==
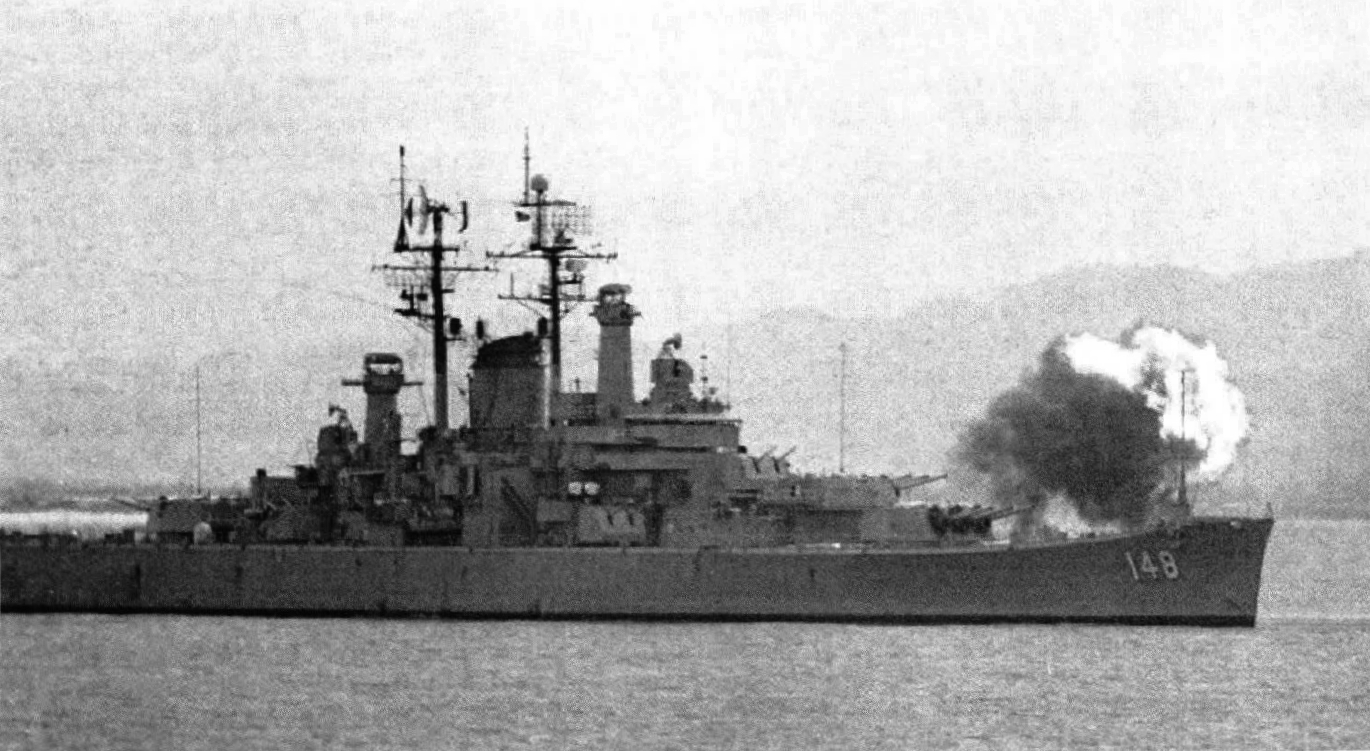
American USS Newport News shells North Vietnamese positions on Cồn Cỏ Island, a feint attack, 27 June 1972

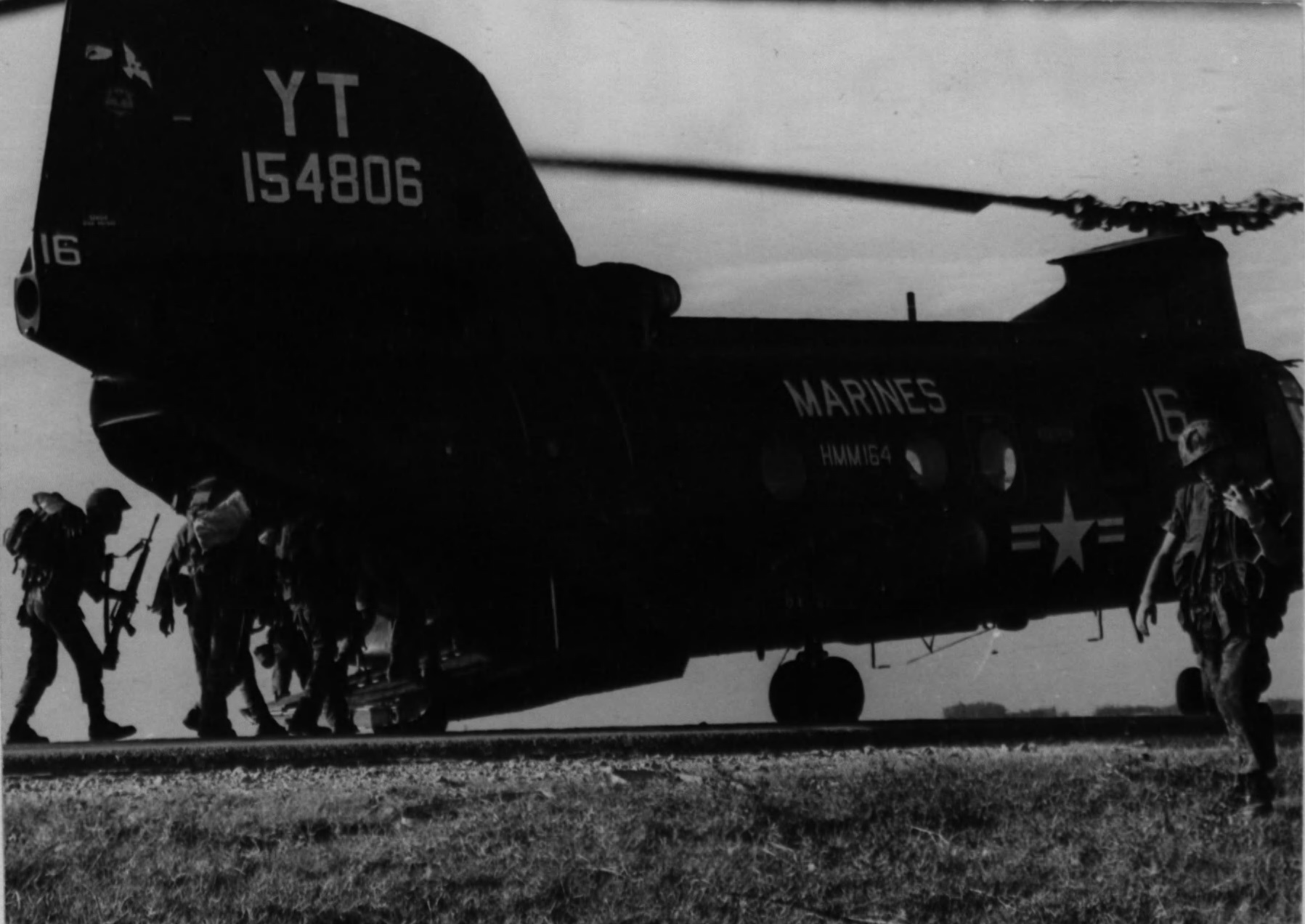
South Vietnamese Marines load into an HMM-164 CH-46 to join the offensive, 28 June

On the morning of 27 June the 9th MAB launched their amphibious feint against Cửa Việt, reversing course when 7 km from shore.

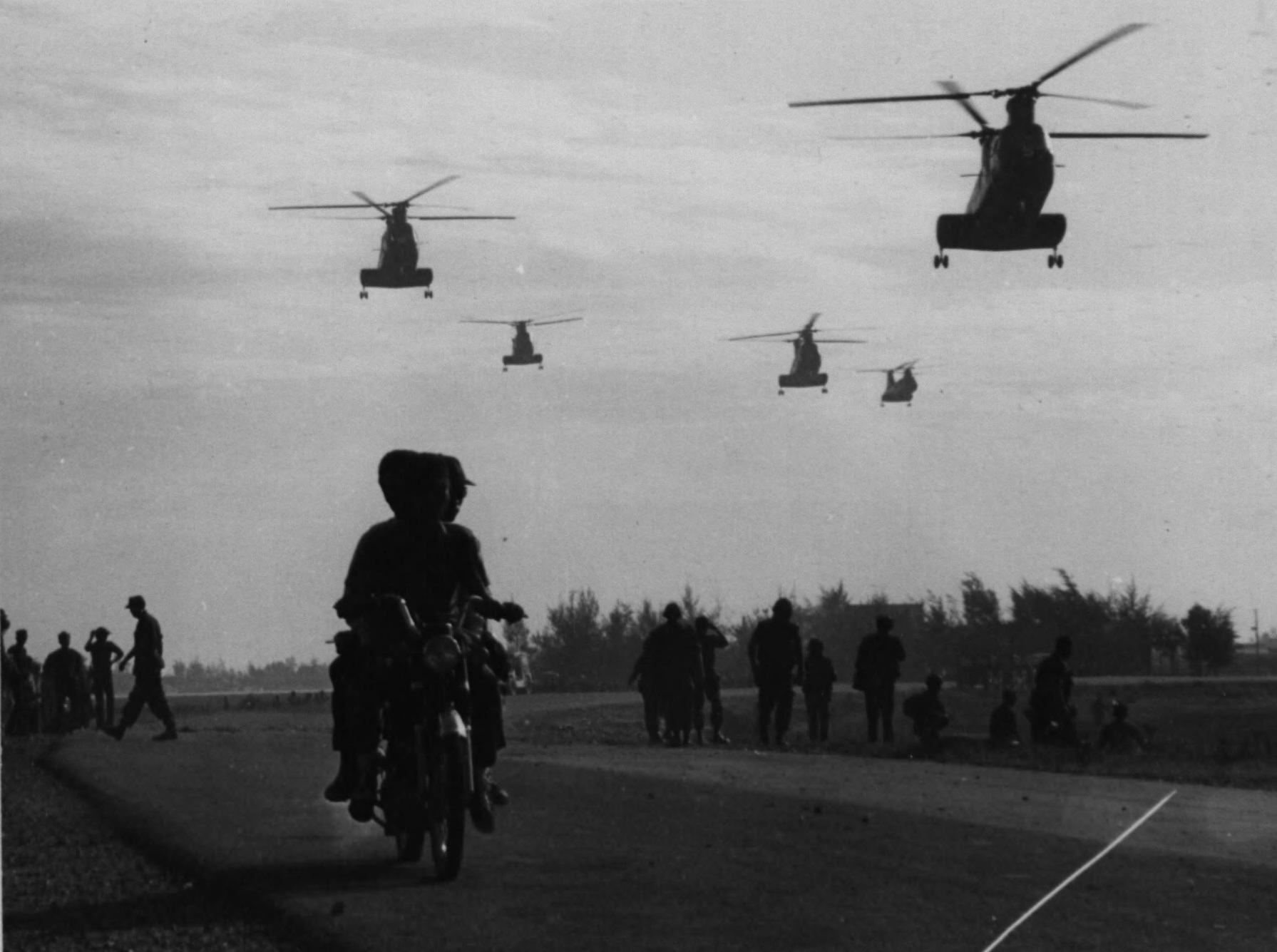
HMM-165 CH-46s land near Huế during Operation Lam Sơn 72, 28 June

On 28 June the South Vietnamese advance began and quickly ran into strong PAVN resistance and helicopter assaults were launched to land troops behind PAVN positions. On 29 June, following preparatory airstrikes the VNMC 1st and 4th Battalions were landed by U.S. Marine helicopter squadrons HMM-164 and HMM-165 near the Wunder Beach area. That day a 20th Tactical Air Support Squadron OV-10 Bronco that was operating as a forward air controller in support of the VNMC was hit by an SA-7 missile and crashed into the sea, killing its pilot, Captain Steven L. Bennett, who would be posthumously awarded the Medal of Honor. By the end of June the Allies had killed 1,515 PAVN, destroyed 18 armored vehicles and the Marines had taken 15 PAVN prisoners.

By 7 July the Airborne Division had reached the southern outskirts of Quảng Trị City, but then Thiệu intervened in the operation. Trưởng had planned to bypass the city and push on quickly to the Thạch Hãn River, thereby isolating any PAVN defenders. Thiệu, however, now demanded that Quảng Trị be taken immediately, seeing the city as "a symbol and a challenge" to his authority.

The ARVN assault bogged down in the outskirts and the PAVN, apprised of the plans for the offensive, moved the 304th and 308th Divisions to the west to avoid the U.S. airpower that was about to be unleashed upon Quảng Trị.

The defense of the Quảng Trị Citadel (Vietnamese: Thành cổ Quảng Trị) was left to PAVN replacement units and militia. One participant recalled: "The new recruits came in at dusk. They were dead by dawn... No one had time to check where they were from, or who was their commander. Others described the defense as a "senseless sacrifice" and referred to Quảng Trị as "Hamburger City". Nevertheless, the PAVN units stationed within the citadel were well dug in, had the advantage of terrain and mass artillery supports. An early ARVN victory was denied, and the fighting continue unabated.

By 10 July, the forward units of the VNMC 1st, 3rd, 5th, 7th and 8th Battalions were on a line that ran generally from the bend in Route 555 as it turned west toward Quảng Trị, eastward to the coast. With the Airborne Division stalled on the outskirts of the city, VNMC commander General Bùi Thế Lân was reluctant to expose an unprotected flank as his division continued northward. To break the impasse, Lân decided to move one battalion by helicopter across the Vĩnh Định River to a position just northeast of the city while two battalions would assault PAVN positions from east to west. The mission of the Marines was to block Route 560 and to prevent the PAVN from resupplying their forces in the city itself.

On 11 July, following preparatory B-52 strikes, the VNMC 1st Battalion was deployed by HMM-164 and HMM-165 helicopters to two landing zones 2 km northeast of the city to cut Route 560, the main PAVN supply line. This move would force the PAVN to reinforce and resupply across the Thạch Hãn River, making them vulnerable to air strikes. The helicopters were met by heavy anti-aircraft fire with one CH-53 being hit by an SA-7 and crashing with two U.S. Marine crewmen and 45 South Vietnamese Marines killed. Two CH-46s were shot down and their crews rescued by helicopters from the U.S. Army Troop F, 4th Cavalry while another 25 helicopters were damaged. Despite these loses the South Vietnamese Marines deployed successfully and consolidated their positions with air and artillery support against the opposing PAVN 48th Regiment, 320B Division. The Marines killed 126 PAVN, captured six, secured large quantities of material, and flanked the PAVN position. Fighting continued in the area for three days before the PAVN retreated to the west. During the same period the 7th Battalion overran an armored regiment's command post. A ban on U.S. airstrikes within the city was instituted on 15 July because Thiệu wanted Quảng Trị recaptured by his army without American assistance. However an attack of the ARVN against the PAVN on 3 August bogged down, so Thiệu was forced to lift restrictions on U.S. airstrikes within Quảng Trị. The Republic of Vietnam Air Force (RVNAF) received some of the CBU-55 fuel-air devices from the U.S. in time to try them against the PAVN in this battle.

By 20 July the Marine Division had consolidated its position north of Quảng Trị City, while the Airborne continued trying to break in. On 22 July the Marines launched a three battalion operation against PAVN supply lines south of the Thạch Hãn River. The 5th Battalion would be landed by HMM-164 helicopters 4 km north of the city, while the other two battalions, supported by tanks would attack north, the combined force would then move southeast. The helicopter landing proceeded smoothly, while the ground assault met heavy resistance and could only break through PAVN defenses with air and artillery support. After two days the Marines had killed 133 PAVN and destroyed three tanks.

On 27 July, the Marine Division was ordered to relieve the Airborne units as the lead element in the battle. Progress was slow, consisting of vicious house-to-house fighting and incessant artillery barrages by both sides. During July, the ARVN claimed the PAVN lost more than 1,880 dead, 51 armored vehicles captured or destroyed and seven antiaircraft guns, four artillery pieces, a 20-ton ammunition dump and 1,200 individual weapons captured. During July, U.S. aircraft flew 5,461 tactical sorties and 2,054 B-52 strikes and operated five aircraft carriers to support the counteroffensive.

As August began, most of Quảng Trị remained in PAVN hands. The territory north and west of the Thạch Hãn River, particularly around Ái Tử Combat Base, was dotted with PAVN artillery units which maintained a seemingly ceaseless artillery and mortar barrage on the South Vietnamese. The Marine brigades were well placed to deny PAVN resupply and to make a final lunge into the heart of the city, the Citadel, but were held off by the well-concealed defenders. PAVN fire and the congestion of friendly units in the area severely hampered maneuver by the Marines. 147th Brigade, operating northeast of Quảng Trị, began receiving heavy pressure from the PAVN, but had thwarted several attempts by the numerically superior PAVN to reopen Route 560 northeast of the city. The Marines' supply blockade began to take its toll on the PAVN's ammunition stockpiles. All PAVN supplies making their way into the city had to be ferried across the Thạch Hãn River. To the south, the 258th Brigade, with four maneuver battalions under its operational control, was in heavy house-to-house fighting around the Citadel. The 3rd Battalion attacked from the northeast, with the 6th and 9th Battalions closing in from the southwest. Each day, the 258th Brigade moved slowly forward, tightening its grasp on the PAVN forces still in the Citadel. This slow progress made Lân realize that he would have to reinforce his maneuver forces if they were to overpower the three PAVN regiments holding the Citadel. Lân continued to keep the 369th Brigade in division reserve. On 22 August, after an artillery barrage on the 8th Battalion a sizable PAVN force led by tanks attempted to break out from the Citadel. The Marines, surprised at such an action, quickly rallied and drove the PAVN back into the Citadel. During the remainder of the month, the PAVN increased the number of night attacks in an effort to break through the Marine lines.

As September began, Marine units had been in constant street fighting inside the city for 35 days under some of the heaviest enemy artillery shelling since the invasion in March. The forward maneuver battalions had been under daily counterattacks by units of the 308th Division. In the city, the 1st, 3rd, 5th, 6th and 8th Battalions attacked through the rubble to reach the Citadel and the Highway 1 bridge over the Thạch Hãn River. On 5 September the PAVN attacked the 5th Battalion's command post at dusk and were met by artillery fire and directing air strikes. At 21:30 the PAVN withdrew in confusion having left behind more than 50 individual and crew-served weapons.

A battalion from the 147th Brigade had taken up positions at the An Tiêm Bridge where Route 560 crossed the Vĩnh Định River. All PAVN supply and infiltration routes and lines of communication to the north were effectively blocked. The PAVN were feeling the bite of supply and ammunition shortages. On 8 September, the three battalions of the 1st Ranger Group relieved the 147th Brigade of its blocking mission north of the city. Lân now had two brigades he could commit in the pincer movement which would begin the all-out assault on the city. The 258th Brigade continued its attack along the southern front with four battalions while the 147th Brigade attacked from the northeast with the 3rd and 7th Battalions. Trưởng and Lân also requested an amphibious diversion by the U.S. Seventh Fleet to draw the enemy away from the Marines attacking the Citadel. The U.S. amphibious forces agreed to carry out the feint, except for an actual landing.

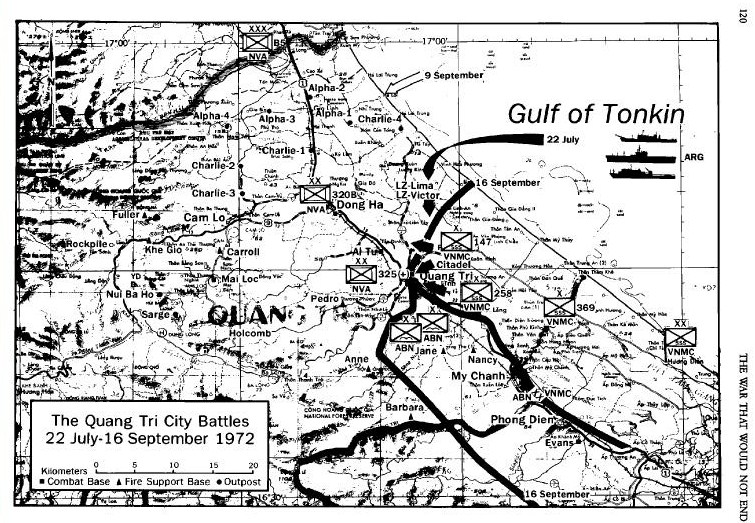
Map of the last phase of Operation Lam Sơn 72

On 9 September, the final assault to capture the citadel was launched by the 147th and 258th Brigades. The amphibious diversion succeeded in drawing away PAVN artillery fire from the Citadel enabling the Marines to advance rapidly. An imaginary line drawn across the middle of the Citadel became the boundary between the two Marine brigades. The 258th Brigade continued its attack in the southern portion while the 147th Brigade attacked in the northern half, the 3rd Battalion, now attached to the 147th Brigade and closest to the northern wall of the Citadel, stood fast while the 7th Battalion deployed to its north. Near the southeast corner of the Citadel, Lieutenant Colonel Đỗ Hữu Tùng, commanding officer of the 6th Battalion with the 258th Brigade, set up a forward command post and moved within striking distance of the walls of the Citadel, which were 30 inches (760 mm) thick and 15 feet (4.6 m) high. A lot of this wall had already been reduced to rubble, but much of it still stood. Progress toward the wall was slow because the PAVN had tunnelled an intricate and interlocking defensive system throughout the entire fortress. On the night of 9 September, a squad of Marines from the 6th Battalion managed to slip in and out of the Citadel. At 21:00 on 10 September, Tùng launched a night attack against the PAVN on the southeast corner and was successful in gaining a lodgement on top of the wall. Early on 11 September, a platoon moved over this section of the wall, and in spite of stubborn enemy resistance, expanded to occupy a company-sized position within a few hours. While the fighting for the Citadel was going on, the 1st Battalion had secured the bridgehead where Highway 1 crossed the Thạch Hãn River and held it despite several fierce PAVN counterattacks. From 11 to 15 September, the 2nd Battalion reached the Thạch Hãn River, closing the gap between the 1st and 6th Battalions. The 3rd and 7th Battalions fought their way through the northern part of the city and reached the fortress wall on the morning of 15 September. At 10:15 that same day, the 3rd Battalion entered the north side of the Citadel. That afternoon the PAVN stiffened their resistance and called in a massive artillery barrage to stop the 3rd and 6th Battalions as they advanced toward the west wall. By 17:00 on 15 September, the Marines had gained complete control of the Citadel. Meanwhile between 11 and 15 September the 2nd Battalion advanced to the southern bank of the Thạch Hãn River, where they halted, exhausted and depleted by heavy casualties and unable to push on to Đông Hà. Shortly after noon on 16 September, Marines raised the flag of South Vietnam over the west gate of the citadel, signifying the end of 138 days of North Vietnamese occupation.

== Aftermath ==
This battle was the longest and fiercest in the Vietnam War, with Quảng Trị city being compared to Berlin 1945. During the battle, the South Vietnamese sources claimed that they lost 977 killed out of 3,658 casualties (Marine division only). The ARVN Airborne Division also sustained heavy casualties, its 2nd Airborne Brigade was annihilated after two weeks: the 5th Battalion (600 men) suffered 98 killed and 400 wounded and the other two battalions were in no better shape, four of six American advisers were wounded. U.S. losses were approximately 20 killed. North Vietnamese sources claim its losses were between 4000 and 10,000 killed. South Vietnamese sources claim that North Vietnamese losses were 8,135 killed. The South Vietnamese forces eventually captured the city, yet at a high price of casualties that seriously depleted their manpower, leading to many assessments of their success as a "Pyrrhic victory". The heavy losses suffered by both sides during the battle put the fighting in Quang Tri Province thereafter into a stalemate, as described by an American advisor: "They were like two fighters in the 14th or 15th round. They could hardly do anything but hold on to each other."

On 20 September, Thiệu visited the Marine Division in Quảng Trị to congratulate the commander, officers and men. Promotions and decorations were liberally awarded for this victory. On 25 September, the 369th Brigade opened a new command post at Hải Lăng district and assumed operational control of the battalions at Quảng Trị and the 147th Brigade assumed defensive positions along the coast and on the division's right flank. The 258th Brigade reverted to division reserve. Lân was anxious to reoccupy all of the territory lost during the PAVN invasion prior to any kind of ceasefire negotiations. Since the beginning of the Easter Offensive, when U.S. President Richard Nixon outlined the conditions for such a ceasefire, Thiệu had been concerned that all lost South Vietnamese ground be regained prior to an in-place settlement. PAVN activity had dropped sharply after the taking of Quảng Trị, but it was evident that the PAVN was still present in strength just outside the city. Identification of a unit from the 312th Division raised the PAVN presence to six divisions in Quảng Trị Province, as reported by the 1st Regional Assistance Command. PAVN artillery fire from the northwest which daily showered VNMC positions occasionally was followed by nighttime probing attacks.

Heavy monsoon rains began to fall in October and would continue until the end of December. The area to the east of the city was low-lying coastal marshlands, threaded with rivers, and was difficult enough to cross in good weather. The torrential rains would make passage impossible in some areas. With growing concern about the peace negotiations in Paris, Lân recommended that an attempt to take the offensive should be made immediately, taking advantage of the lull in PAVN operations and the continued presence of 9th MAB support. Route 560, north of Quảng Trị, was the only improved line of communications east of Highway 1 leading to the Thạch Hãn River, This was the obvious axis of attack and Lân hoped to move north by some other route and to do so before the monsoon restricted his options. He ordered Colonel Nguyễn Năng Bảo's 147th Brigade to attack north along Route 560 to push the PAVN beyond mortar range of Quảng Trị and to capture Triệu Phong District Headquarters. Accomplishment of this mission would also serve to cut a major PAVN supply line. On 7 October, prior to H-Hour, the Marine Division's fire support coordination center arranged for heavy artillery, naval gunfire, and close air support. At H-hour the 8th Battalion the attack under difficult circumstances along Route 560. The highway ran through a marshland between the Thạch Hãn River and the Vĩnh Đinh River, where thick groves of bamboo and hedgerows permitted PAVN snipers to fire point-blank at the advancing Marines. The attack continued for three days against heavy resistance. On 10 October, with the front lines extended the desired distance, Bảo moved his other three battalions on line and awaited further orders. The operation had resulted in 111 PAVN killed and 55 weapons captured.

On 20 October, Lân ordered Bảo to conduct a second operation along the eastern flank of the brigade front. The attack, conducted by the 9th Battalion supported by armor, was designed to extend the friendly lines north toward the Thạch Hãn River. The river was critical to the defense of Quảng Trị; whoever controlled the Thạch Hãn controlled the economic lifeline of the province. The river also was sufficiently deep and wide to accommodate landing craft inland all the way to Đông Hà and into Quảng Trị itself. It was essential that this artery be in South Vietnamese hands prior to any settlement. The 9th Battalion encountered stiff resistance as it moved north. The eastern portion of the two-pronged attack reached its objectives, but the western portion was held up by a heavy 122mm rocket attack. U.S. Army armed helicopter "Pink Teams" were called in to suppress the rocket positions. With the fire suppressed, the western prong moved on line with the eastern force on an axis about six kilometers from the Thạch Hãn River, still short of its south bank.

The 369th Brigade, commanded by Lieutenant Colonel Nguyển Thế Lương, held the western portion of the division front against an PAVN attack the first week in October, but the remainder of the month was relatively quiet with the exception of daily enemy bombardments. The brigade conducted limited patrolling to its front and meanwhile improved defensive positions in Quảng Trị. During the month several reconnaissance patrols crossed the Thạch Hãn River to try to determine the PAVN's intentions. The 258th Brigade, with Colonel Ngô Văn Định in command, remained the division reserve. By October's end, the Marine front lines had stabilized along a line that could permit subsequent efforts to establish a foothold on the Cửa Việt outlet to the sea. Morale and discipline remained high for all VNMC units as they improved positions and replacements filled the depleted ranks.

On 1 November, orders came from Saigon for the Marines to cross the Thạch Hãn River west of Quảng Trị in an effort to expand the division's area of control. Under the cover of early morning darkness, the 369th Brigade sent 600 Marines led by the 6th Battalion across the Thạch Hãn River directly opposite the Citadel. The crossing, using sampans, small boats, and barges, was not without difficulties. Some of the Marines drowned as sampans overturned and guide ropes broke. By dawn on 2 November, however, nearly 200 Marines were established on the western side, followed shortly by 200 more. As the Marines moved inland they were vigorously opposed by the PAVN. The forward elements bogged down 500 meters from the river line in the face of heavy automatic weapons and mortar fire. The PAVN counterattacked the Marine foothold with a regiment supported by mortars and artillery. The massive counterattack reflected the PAVN's firm intention to maintain positions west of Quảng Trị and to deny South Vietnamese forces access to the Ái Tử area, Later in the day, as the Marines moved north along Highway 1, between a small canal and the Thạch Hãn River, they came under intense small arms fire from concealment in the dense foliage. All of the company commanders were killed and more than 40 Marines were reported missing. Despite the employment of every available supporting arm, the Marines could not make headway. During the hours of darkness of 2–3 November, the 6th Battalion withdrew east of the Thạch Hãn River, leaving only a reconnaissance team on the west bank. The 6th Battalion operation was the Marines' last effort to cross the Thạch Hãn River prior to the ceasefire in January 1973.

On 11 November the VNMC began an operation to extend its control to the northwest. As Lieutenant Colonel Trần Xuân Quang's 4th Battalion attacked, it was stopped by intense artillery and mortar fire and localized ground counterattacks. The PAVN appeared determined that the Marines would not reach the Thạch Hãn River. In spite of severe resupply problems, the PAVN expended five times more ordnance during November than it had in October. The monsoon rains curtailed both PAVN and Marine movement. Transporting supplies was difficult for both sides, and living conditions were equally oppressive. Route 555 itself was nearly obliterated by rising water and rendered unusable. The PAVN expended every effort to keep forward units close to the Marine positions and thus hopefully to make tactical air and naval gunfire support impossible. On one occasion, however, the tactic did not work. A B-52 strike was conducted in support of the 4th Battalion which was operating just south of the Thạch Hãn River mouth in Cửa Việt near the beach. Six prominent hill masses were the only logical positions for the PAVN to occupy, above the flooded lowlands. Previously, B-52s had dropped their bombs with such devastating effect that it was unnecessary to rebomb the same position. On this occasion, however, three of the six hill masses were programmed for additional strikes six minutes after the first, killing PAVN soldiers who had survived the first strike.

In December the frontlines generally remained static with the VNMC no closer than 3.5 miles (5.6 km) from the Thạch Hãn River. During the first part of the month the PAVN initiated nothing larger than company-sized attacks. However, at dawn on 17 December, the PAVN launched a battalion-sized attack on the 7th Battalion, located west of the Vĩnh Định Canal. The PAVN, in two separate attacks, lost 37 dead on 18 December and 132 killed the next day and gained no ground. Documents found on PAVN dead and on prisoners revealed that at least three regiments opposed the VNMC efforts to move north. The 27th, 48th and 101st Regiments were making every effort to fix the Marines in place.

There was very light contact between the two forces as 1973 began, both sides made probes and counterprobes. On 14 January, the frontline battalions of 147th and 258th Brigades had heavy contact with the PAVN all along the front. On 15 January, under orders from Saigon, Lân began planning for a final effort to gain the Thạch Hãn River prior to the now-certain ceasefire. The Paris Peace Accords were to be signed on 27 January and take effect at 8:00 the following day. The attack was to be made by an infantry and tank force with enough power to reach and cross the Thạch Hãn River. This would result in the Battle of Cửa Việt, where South Vietnam was initially successful in recapturing Cửa Việt on 28 January, but then retreated on 31 January due to a PAVN counterattack in violation of the peace treaty.

== See also ==
- Hue–Da Nang Campaign
- Battle of Quang Tri (1968)
- Battle of Huế
- Cold War
- Boeing B-52 Stratofortress
- Battle of Kontum
- Battle of An Lộc
