= Nguyễn Huy Hiệu =

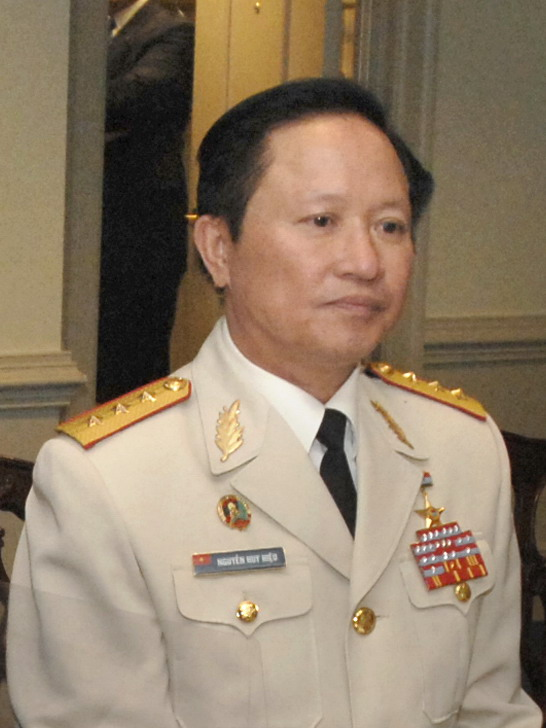
- Colonel General Nguyễn Huy Hiệu in 2009
- Born: 1947 (age 78–79); Hải Hậu, Nam Định, Vietnam
- Military career
- Allegiance: Vietnam
- Branch: Vietnam People's Army
- Service years: 1965 – 2011
- Rank: Colonel General
- Commands: Deputy Minister of Defence of Vietnam; Member of the Central Committee of the Communist Party of Vietnam
- Conflicts: Vietnam War
- Awards: Hero of the People's Armed Forces

Colonel General Nguyễn Huy Hiệu (born 1947) is an officer of the Vietnam People's Army and current Deputy Minister of Defence of Vietnam. Enlisted in 1965, Nguyễn Huy Hiệu fought in various battlefields during Vietnam War, especially the Battle of Quảng Trị where he was appointed commander of battalion at the age of 23. Nguyễn Huy Hiệu began to hold the position of Deputy Minister of Defence in 1994.

== Early life ==
Nguyễn Huy Hiệu was born in 1947 in Long Hải commune, Hải Hậu District, Nam Định to a peasant family. He is descendant of Nguyễn Bặc, a renowned general of the Đinh Dynasty. His birth name was Nguyễn Văn Hiệu but before enlisting, he decided to change his name to Nguyễn Huy Hiệu in wishing that he would become a commander in battlefield.

== Military career ==
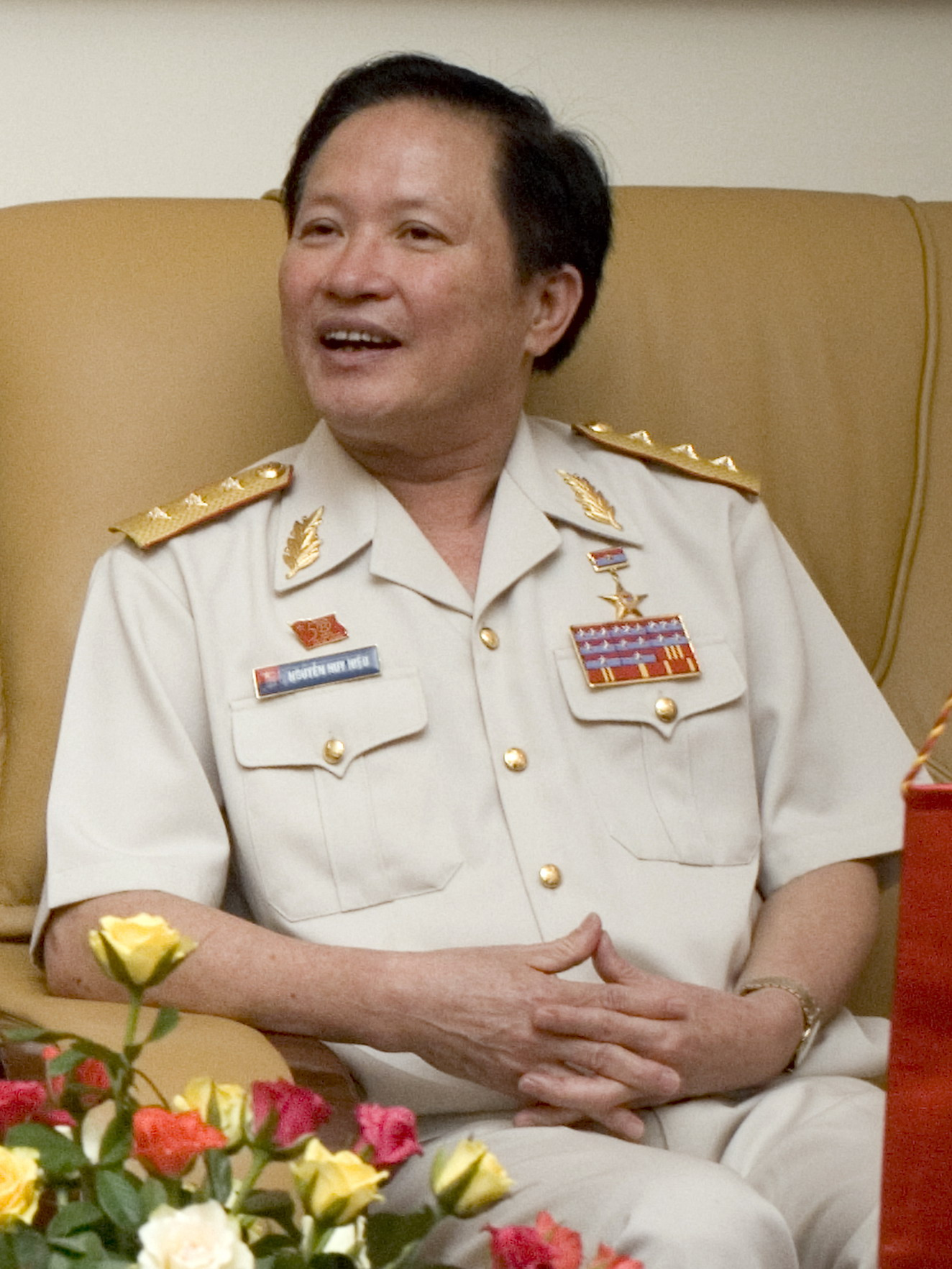
Col. Gen. Nguyễn Huy Hiệu in 2007.

Nguyễn Huy Hiệu joined the Vietnam People's Army in 1965 at the age of 18. Two year later he became a member of the Labour Party of Vietnam. After serving in Laos, in February 1968 he began to fight in the Quảng Trị front where he was recognized for his skill in commanding and was rapidly promoted to commander of battalion (Vietnamese: tiểu đoàn trưởng) in October 1970 at the age of 23. During the First Battle of Quảng Trị in May 1973, he was appointed commander of regiment (trung đoàn trưởng) of the 27th Infantry Regiment, 320th Division, he was also bestowed on the title Hero of the People's Armed Forces (Anh hùng Lực lượng vũ trang nhân dân). During Vietnam War, he was decorated with total five Liberation Distinguished Service Medals (Huân chương Chiến công Giải phóng), fourteen Brave Soldier Titles (Danh hiệu Dũng sĩ) and other awards.

After the war, Nguyễn Huy Hiệu studied at the Military Academy of Vietnam and served as commander of various military units of the Vietnam People's Army. In June 1988 he was appointed general commander (tư lệnh) of the 1st Corps, one of the four corps of the Vietnam People's Army. In October 1994, Nguyễn Huy Hiệu became Deputy Chief of Staff and Deputy Minister Defence, a position that he holds until now.

== Rank ==
Nguyễn Huy Hiệu was promoted to Major General (thiếu tướng) in 1988, Lieutenant General (trung tướng) in 1998 and Colonel General (thượng tướng) in 2003.
