= 324th Division (Vietnam) =

324th Infantry Division
- Active: ~1955-present
- Allegiance: Vietnam
- Branch: Vietnam People's Army
- Type: Infantry
- Size: Division
- Part of: 4th Military Region
- Garrison/HQ: Nghệ An Province, Vietnam
- Engagements: Quỳnh Lưu uprising Operation Hastings; Con Thien; Operation Buffalo; Operation Kingfisher; Operation Kentucky; Easter Offensive; 1975 Spring Offensive; Hue-Da Nang Campaign

Commanders
- Notable commanders: Tran Quy Ha

The 324th Division (named as 324B Division during Vietnam War) is an infantry division of the People's Army of Vietnam (PAVN) assigned to the 4th Military Region (Vietnam People's Army).

== First Indochina War ==
Among the first divisions raised, the 324th Division participated in the Battle of Hòa Bình. Alongside the 320th Division and other units, this division had participated in laying ambushes on armoured and relief convoys intending to lift the siege of Dien Bien Phu alongside the battle itself.

== Vietnam War ==
Starting in 1955, the 90th Regiment, 324th Division began operating in Cambodia and training cadres and battalions from ethnic Khmer and Central Highlands groups. These groups were to be trained as the nucleus for future revolutionary activities, in particular in securing the routes along the Ho Chi Minh Trail. In 1961, the division was placed in Xépôn and along Route 9, on the Ho Chi Minh Trail.

=== 1966-67 ===
In response to increasing U.S. airstrikes, the division was deployed increasingly southwards alongside artillery regiments attached to it to harass U.S. forces in northern Quảng Trị Province.

In April 1966 U.S. intelligence reported that the division was digging in north of the Vietnamese Demilitarized Zone (DMZ). On the morning of 19 May, units from the 324B attacked isolated Army of the Republic of Vietnam (ARVN) outposts at Con Thien and Gio Linh south of the DMZ. On 6 July two soldiers from 812th Regiment of the division were captured by marines near the Rockpile, they revealed that their mission was to liberate Quảng Trị Province. In response to this, the marines launched Operation Hastings which ran from 15 July to 3 August 1966. Losses among the division amounted to 824 killed and 17 captured.

On the early morning of 26 August the division's 812th Regiment attacked Cam Lộ Combat Base killing nine marines.

At 04:00 on 8 May 1967 following an hour-long mortar and artillery barrage, the 4th and 6th Battalions of the 812th Regiment attacked the Marine base at Con Thien By 09:00 the marines had repulsed the attack and the 812th Regiment withdrew leaving 197 dead and eight prisoners. On 14 May during Operation Prairie IV, the 1st Battalion 9th Marines (1/9 Marines) clearing Route 561 from Cam Lo to Con Thien were ambushed by the 6th Battalion, 812th Regiment, 28 marines were killed for the loss of 134 PAVN.

On 2 July the marines launched Operation Buffalo, a sweep of the area north of Con Thien. As the 1/9 Marines moved along Route 561 in an area called the Marketplace, the 90th Regiment attacked the marines, inflicting severe casualties on Company B. This was the single worst day for marines in Vietnam with 84 killed. Operation Buffalo concluded on 14 July at a cost of 159 marines killed, while the 90th Regiment suffered 1,290 killed.

On 16 July the marines launched Operation Kingfisher in the western part of Leatherneck Square with the 324th also participating. The operation concluded on 31 October, in a series of skirmishes and ambushes the division had lost 1,117 killed and five captured, while 340 marines were killed.

In early November 1967, an Arc Light strike hit the headquarters of the 812th Regiment 3 miles (4.8 km) southwest of Con Thien.

On 1 November 1967, the marines launched Operation Kentucky as part of the continuing operations to secure the DMZ around Con Thien. The operation concluded on 28 February 1969, and the division and 320th Division lost a total of 3,839 killed and 117 captured, while the marines lost 520 killed.

=== 1968-72 ===
The entire division participated in the Battle of Khe Sanh.

In early 1971 the division together with other PAVN units opposed Operation Lam Son 719. By 19 March the division's 29th and 803rd Regiments Regiment were attacking the South Vietnamese 147th Marine Brigade operating around Fire Support Base Delta (16.550°N 106.539°E) while its 812th Regiment attacked the 258th Marine Brigade at Fire Support Base Hotel in an attempt to prevent ARVN withdrawal along Route 9. At dawn on 21 March the 29th and 803rd Regiments attacked FSB Delta, the marines held on, supported by artillery fire and airstrikes including B-52 strikes which a prisoner later reported had killed 400 PAVN soldiers. The marines lost 85 killed, while the division lost 600 killed, five captured and 200 individual and 60 crew-served weapons captured. On the afternoon of 22 March the division resumed its attack on FSB Delta supported by 10 tanks, the marines destroyed the first two with M72 LAWs, mines destroyed a third and an airstrike destroyed the fourth but the remainder pressed the attack and the Marine Brigade withdrew towards Fire Support Base Hotel but were ambushed en route. By the morning of 23 March the 147th Marine Brigade had regrouped at FSB Hotel and were evacuated into South Vietnam having lost 37 killed or missing, total losses for the division were estimated as being 2,000 killed or wounded.

During the 1972 Easter Offensive the division cut Highway 1 south of Quảng Trị and carried out the Shelling of Highway 1 in which an estimated 2000 civilians were killed by the indiscriminate artillery fire.

On 17 May 1974 PAVN 2nd Corps was formed comprising the division, the 304th and 325C Divisions, the 673rd Air Defense Division, the 164th Artillery Brigade, the 203rd tank Brigade, the 219th Engineer Brigade and the 463rd Signal Regiment under the command of Major General Hoàng Văn Thái.

On 18 July 1974, the division's 29th Regiment, overran the An Hoa Industrial Complex and then on 29 July attacked the town of Thượng Ðức, which was defended by the ARVN 79th Ranger Battalion. Two regiments of the 304th Division joined the fight for Thượng Ðức which continued until 11 November 1974 with heavy losses for both sides.

From 28 August to 10 December 1974 the division's 803rd and 812th Regiments participated in the Battle of Phú Lộc for the control of hills that would allow the PAVN to shell Phu Bai Air Base and interdict Highway 1. After heavy fighting that depleted its reserve forces the South Vietnamese recaptured the hills. The PAVN claim to have "eliminated" 2,500 ARVN during the battle.

=== 1975 ===
As part of the Hue-Da Nang Campaign on 19 March the 324B and the 325C attacked the ARVN 1st Division and the 15th Ranger Group along Route 1 south of Huế. On the afternoon of 22 March the division pushed the 15th Rangers out of Phú Lộc cutting Route 1 and forcing the ARVN forces to withdraw back to a defensive line around Phu Bai Combat Base. On 24 March all ARVN forces were ordered to abandon Huế and regroup in Danang, a disorganised seaborne evacuation followed and the 1st Regiment, 324th Division along with the VC 4th and 271st Regiments were able to destroy the last elements of the 147th Marine Brigade and the 15th Ranger Group, before they could board Republic of Vietnam Navy vessels anchored off the shores of Hương Thuy, Luong Thien and Ke Sung and Cu Lai. By 25 March the PAVN was in control of the city.

For the attack on Danang, by 26 March the division's 3rd Regiment was located southwest of the city, the 9th Regiment of the 304th was located northwest of Danang, while the rest of the 304th and 711th Divisions encircled from the south and the 325C Division advanced from the north. By the afternoon of 29 March the 2nd Corps had penetrated the ARVN defences and entered the city which finally fell on 31 March.

== Composition ==
Its reported composition in 2024 includes:

- Headquarters
  - Department of Staff
  - Department of Politics
  - Department of Logistics - Technicals
- 1st Infantry Regiment (three infantry battalions)
- 3rd Infantry Regiment (three infantry battalions, one tank battalion)
- 335th Infantry Regiment (three infantry battalions)
- 14th Artillery Battalion
- 15th Anti-tank Battalion (SPG-9)
- 16th Air Defense Battalion
- 17th Engineer Battalion
- 18th Signals Battalion
- 20th Reconnaissance Company
- 23rd Guards Company
- 24th Medical Battalion
- 25th Transportation Battalion
- 26th Maintenance Company
