= 308th Infantry Division (Vietnam) =

- Founded: 1950
- Allegiance: Vietnam
- Branch: People's Army of Vietnam
- Type: Infantry
- Role: Mechanized infantry, rapid response force
- Size: Division
- Part of: 12th Corps
- Garrison/HQ: Xuan Mai, Chuong My, Hanoi, Vietnam
- Nicknames: Quân Tiên Phong (The Vanguards), Việt Bắc
- Engagements: First Indochina War: Battle of Vĩnh Yên; Battle of Mạo Khê; Battle of the Day River; Operation Lorraine; Battle of Nà Sản; Battle of Điện Biên Phủ; Vietnam War: Battle of Khe Sanh; Southern Laos Campaign; Easter Offensive; First Battle of Quảng Trị; Second Battle of Quảng Trị; 1975 Spring Offensive

Commanders
- Notable commanders: LTG Vương Thừa Vũ; CG Nguyễn Hữu An

The 308th Infantry Division is a division of the People's Army of Vietnam (PAVN), first formed in August 1950 in southern China from the previous Regimental Group 308.

== History ==
=== First Indochina War ===
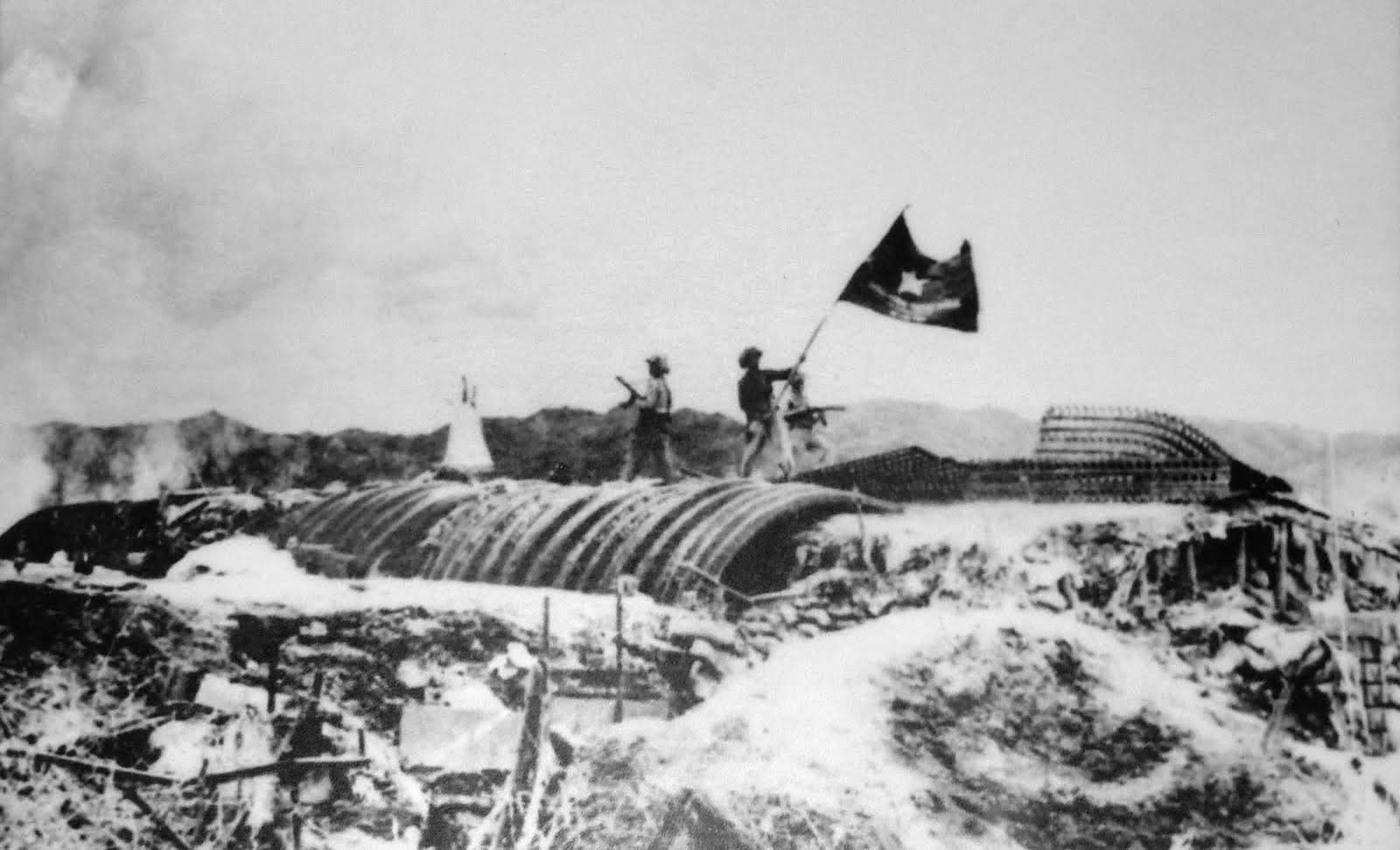
Victorious Việt Minh soldiers at Điện Biên Phủ

As early as January 1946, the first regiment of the PAVN, the 102 'Capital' Regiment, was created for operations around Hanoi. It consisted of Regiments 88, 102, and 36, and soon became the 308 'Vanguard' Division. By late 1950 the 308 Division had a full three infantry regiments, one heavy weapons regiment, and support units.

The 308th initiated the Battle of Vĩnh Yên with an attack on Groupe Mobile 3 on the evening of 13 January 1951, surrounding and half-destroying the unit. The 308th and 312th then surrounded Vĩnh Yên. The French counterattacked and began to airlift reinforcements into Vĩnh Yên. On 16 August the 308th and 312th launched human wave attacks against the French positions which were largely repulsed by French ground fire and airstrikes. At dawn on 17 January the Việt Minh renewed their attacks but were once again devastated by French airstrikes and by midday General Giáp ordered a withdrawal. The two Divisions had lost at least 5000 killed and 500 taken prisoner.

In March 1951, General Giáp again tried a conventional assault on the French forces in the Red River Delta when units of the 308th, 312th and 316th Division threatened the approaches to Haiphong. In this Battle of Mạo Khê the Việt Minh were beaten back by determined resistance from the French garrisons, airstrikes and naval gunfire. Total Việt Minh losses exceeded 1500 killed.

The battered 308th played a minor role in the Battle of the Day River in May/June 1951, making diversionary attacks on Ninh Bình and Phủ Lý.

On 17 October 1952 two regiments of the 308th attacked Nghĩa Lộ overrunning the post in one hour. This attack triggered the French Operation Lorraine launched on 29 October, the largest operation attempted to date by the French Union forces. Giáp planned to wait until the French supply lines were overextended at which point they could be harassed and eventually forced to withdraw. Giáp detached Regiment 36 of the 308th and Regiment 176 of the 316th to defend the important supply bases at Yên Bái and Thái Nguyên. The only major fighting during the operation came during the withdrawal, when the Regiment 36 ambushed Groupe Mobiles 1 and 4 on Route 2 in a narrow valley near Chan Muong on morning of November 17. The Viet Minh managed to blow up one of the leading tanks, completely blocking the road and then, covered by heavy weapons fire from the surrounding hills, proceeded to methodically destroy the convoy. French air support eased the pressure on the forces caught in the valley and then in the afternoon the 2nd Battalion, 2nd Foreign Infantry Regiment and the Battalion de Marche Indochinois (BMI) inside the valley and the lead elements of Groupe Mobile 1 outside the ambush area counterattacked against the Việt Minh, culminating with a bayonet charge by the BMI. At this point the Việt Minh disengaged and the withdrawal could continue with the column arriving at Ngoc Tap at 22:30. The French had lost 56 dead, 125 wounded and 133 missing and 12 vehicles including 1 tank and 6 half-tracks destroyed.

By early 1953 three Việt Minh Divisions were operating in T'ai Highlands and threatening the approaches to Laos. On 23 April 1953 the 308th and 316th had surrounded a French air-land base on the Plain of Jars blocking the approach to Vientiane.

By the end of December 1953, the 308th had arrived in the hills to the north of Điện Biên Phủ and Regiment 88 was soon at work helping improve Route Provinciale 41 which would form the main Việt Minh supply line to Điện Biên Phủ.

In January 1954, the 308th, accompanied by a Battalion from Regiment 176, 316th Division launched a probe towards Luang Prabang, capturing Muong Khoua on 1 February. Hampered by French airpower, the airdrop of the 1st Colonial Parachute Battalion on Muong Sai and the deployment of Groupe Mobile 7 to Luang Prabang, the Việt Minh force withdrew towards Điện Biên Phủ on 20/21 February. By the end of February the 308th was in positions to the west of Điện Biên Phủ.

During the Battle of Điện Biên Phủ, the 308th's first action was on 14 March 1954 attacking the isolated French strongpoint Gabrielle at the north of the valley. After having prepared approach trenches the assault would be launched by Regiment 88 from the north and Regiment 165 from the 312th Division from the east, while Regiment 102 would invest the position from the west and south. The attack started with an artillery barrage at 6pm that continued for more than 2 hours before the ground assault began. By 2:30am on 15 March the Việt Minh assault stalled, but at 3:30am a new artillery barrage commenced and then Regiments 88 and 165 renewed their attacks penetrating the French lines. By 7am the Việt Minh captured the Battalion command post, but French forces continued fighting from their positions in the south of Gabrielle. At dawn on the 15th the French launched a counterattack with the 1 BEP and the newly arrived 5 BPVN supported by M24 tanks. By 6:30am the 1BEP and tanks were halted at a river ford south of Gabrielle by Regiment 102 of the 308th. The 5 BPVN was delayed in joining the 1 BEP and so the 1 BEP and tanks pressed on without them through the choke point. Ar 7:45am after confusion in the French command as to whether Gabrielle was to be relieved or abandoned, the remaining defenders abandoned their positions and by 9am the Việt Minh controlled Gabrielle.

On 28 March Regiment 36 was engaged in the defense against a French attack against Việt Minh anti-aircraft machine guns to the west of the airfield. On the night of 30 March Regiment 36 attacked the 5 BPVN at Strongpoint Huguette 7, while the main Việt Minh attack took place against the 5 Hills to the east of the base. By dawn on 31 March the attack had been repulsed. Regiment 36 renewed their attack on Huguette 7 on the night of 31 March and in a ruse the 5 BPVN withdrew from their positions allowing Regiment 36 to take them over, but at 11pm a French artillery strike on Huguette 7 devastated Regiment 36 and by 10am the 5 BPVN had reoccupied the entire position.

For the battle of the 5 Hills, Regiment 102 was moved to the east of the base to be held in reserve. On 31 March following their failure to capture Eliane 2 the depleted Regiment 98 of the 316th was relieved by Regiment 102. On the night of 31 March Regiment 102 again attempted to take Eliane 2 but was beaten back and then replaced by Regiment 98 on 3 April.

Following the battle of the 5 Hills, Giáp ordered his forces to invest the remaining French positions with trenches and the 308th surrounded Huguette 1 with trenches and gun positions choking off supplies from Huguette 2. On the night of 22 April the Việt Minh burst out of their trenches and tunnel to overrun Huguette 1. The loss of Huguette 1 meant that the Việt Minh controlled most of the airfield further reducing the French parachute drop zone. A French counterattack was attempted on the afternoon of 23 April but was repulsed. On the night of 30 April a Battalion from the 308th attacked Huguette 5 but were forced out by a French counterattack.

On the night of 1 May, Regiment 36 was tasked with taking Lili 3 while Regiment 88 would make another attempt to take Huguette 5. The Regiment 36 attack commenced at 8:30pm, but had been repulsed by daybreak on 7 May. Regiment 88's attack commenced at 2:30am and within an hour they had overrun Huguette 5. For the final assault on the French positions on the night of 6/7 May, Regiment 102 was tasked with taking Claudine 5 while Regiments 36 and 88 would be held in reserve for a final assault. The attack on Claudine 5 began at 10pm and by dawn on 7 May Regiment 102 held the position.

On 7 May after the French ceased firing at 5pm, the 308th moved into the central position from the west and captured the command post of General de Castries. Three Battalions from the 308th were quickly moved south of the base to block any French breakout from the southern strongpoint Isabelle. Total estimated losses among the 308th Division at the Battle of Điện Biên Phủ are 2650 killed.

On 9 October 1954, the 308th was the first Viet Minh Division to enter Hanoi at the same time as the last French troops departed for Haiphong across the Paul Doumer Bridge.

=== Vietnam War ===
During the Tet Offensive the Division was working on flood protection dikes in North Vietnam. Later in 1968 the Division's 36th Regiment was sent to reinforce the Quảng Nam Province-Da Nang Front while the 88th and 102nd Regiments were sent to reinforce the Route 9 Front fighting in the Battle of Khe Sanh.

In October 1970, the PAVN command formed the PAVN B-70 Corps comprising the Division, together with the 304th and 320th Divisions based in southern Laos.

In 1971 the B-70 Corps and ancillary units participated in repulsing Operation Lam Son 719. On 18 February while conducting a B-52 bomb damage assessment north of Route 9 the ARVN 1st Airborne Battalion captured the Division's command post. That afternoon the Division's 102nd Regiment attacked the ARVN 39th Ranger Battalion on Landing Zone Ranger North (16.744°N 106.493°E) and the fighting continued throughout the night. On the night of 19 February the 102nd Regiment continued to attack Ranger North but were kept in check by airstrikes. By the afternoon of 20 February Ranger North was surrounded and radio contact was lost. The 211 survivors of the 39th Rangers fought their way to LZ Ranger South (16.736°N 106.472°E) leaving 178 dead and missing while PAVN losses were estimated at 639 killed with 423 AK-47s and 15 B-40/B-41 launchers destroyed. By 19 March the Division was attacking ARVN positions north of Route 9 and harassing their withdrawal.

In 1972 the division was commanded by Nguyễn Hữu An.

From late March to mid-September 1972 during the Easter Offensive the Division and the 304th Division fought in the First and Second Battles of Quảng Trị.

On 24 October 1973 the PAVN command formed 1st Corps, composed of the Division, the 312th and 338th Divisions, 367th Air Defense Division, 202nd Tank Brigade, 45th Artillery Brigade, 299th Engineer Brigade and the 204th Signal Regiment under the command of Major General Lê Trọng Tấn.

During the initial phases of the 1975 Spring Offensive, the 1st Corps was held in reserve, however following the Vietnamese Politburo decision to capitalise on the opportunity presented by the collapsing Army of the Republic of Vietnam (ARVN), in on 25 March it was ordered to join a general offensive against the South. However the Division remained in North Vietnam to serve as the strategic reserve and defend the north and so did not participate in the offensive.

=== Post-Vietnam War ===
On August 28, 1979, the division was reorganized into the first mechanized infantry division of PAVN and became the rapid response force of the 1st Corps.

=== Present day ===
Today the division is part of the 12th Corps located in the Red River Delta.
