= First Battle of Quảng Trị =

Part of the Vietnam War (1972)

- Part of the Vietnam War
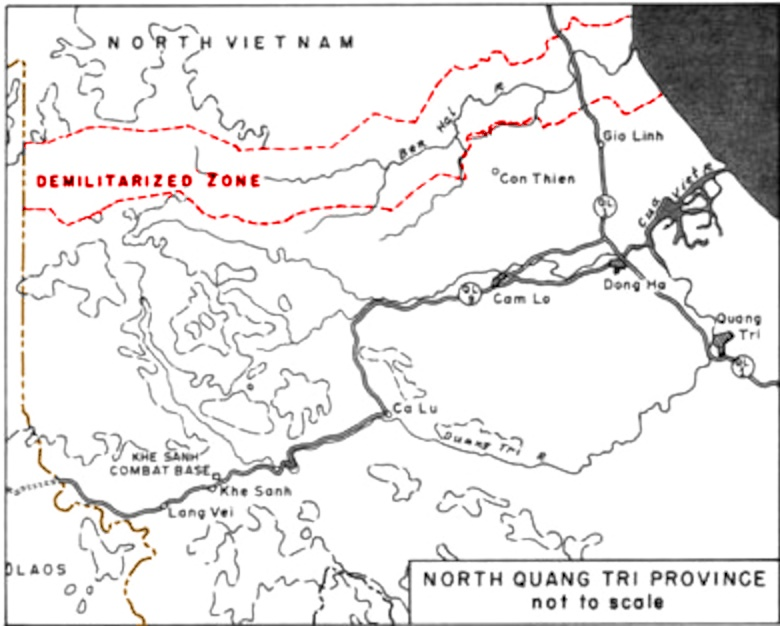
Date	30 March – 2 May 1972
Location	16°44′N 106°58′E; Quảng Trị Province, South Vietnam
Result	North Vietnamese victory

Belligerents
North Vietnam	South Vietnam Supported by: United States

Commanders and leaders
Lê Trọng Tấn (front commander); Lê Quang Đạo (front commissar)	Vũ Văn Giai; Hoàng Xuân Lãm

Units involved
304th Division; 308th Division; 324B Division; Quảng Trị Province Command: 14th infantry company of Local Force; 12th sapper company of Local Force	(South Vietnam) I Corps: 3rd Infantry Division; 56th Regiment; 57th Regiment; Marine Division; 258th Brigade; ARVN Rangers; 4th group; 5th group; 1st Armored Brigade; 20th Tank Regiment; supported by: (United States) Seventh Fleet: Task Force 77; 1st ANGLICO sub unit 1; Seventh Air Force

Strength
45,000+ ~100 tanks and APCs	Regular Force: 40,000 Regional Force: ~100,000; 600 tanks and APCs; 400 aircraft and helicopters

Casualties and losses
Unknown killed 4,619 wounded ~60 tanks and APCs destroyed	1st Armored Brigade: 1,171 casualties 43 M48, 66 M41 tanks, 103 M113s APCs; 20th Tank Regiment: 57 M48 tanks 140 artillery pieces PAVN claim: ~27,000 casualties (3,388 captured); 1,870 vehicles, 340 aircraft and helicopters, 225 artillery pieces and mortars destroyed 194 artillery pieces and mortars, 56 armour vehicles were captured

The First Battle of Quảng Trị (Vietnamese: Chiến dịch Trị Thiên) resulted in the first major victory for the People's Army of Vietnam (PAVN) during the Easter Offensive of 1972. Quảng Trị Province was a major battleground for the opposing forces during the Vietnam War. As South Vietnamese soldiers were gradually replacing their American counterparts, North Vietnam's General Văn Tiến Dũng was preparing to engage three of his divisions in the province. Just months before the battle, the Army of the Republic of Vietnam (ARVN) deployed its newly formed 3rd Division to the areas along the Vietnamese Demilitarized Zone (DMZ) to take over former U.S. bases. North Vietnamese forces deployed against the inexperienced ARVN 3rd Division included the PAVN 304th, 308th and 324B Divisions.

== Background ==
The ARVN 3rd Division was generally responsible for Quảng Trị Province. Its headquarters under the command of Brigadier General Vũ Văn Giai, former deputy commander of the 1st Division, was located at Ái Tử Combat Base. The newly activated 56th and 57th Regiments were deployed over a series of strongpoints and fire support bases dotting the area immediately south of the DMZ and from the coast to the mountains in the west. The 56th Regiment was headquartered at Camp Carroll while the 57th Regiment was located at Firebase C1. The 2nd Regiment occupied Camp Carroll with two of its battalions at Firebase C2. Camp Carroll was the lynchpin of the ARVN northern and western defense line situated on Route 9, the main road west to the Laos border. The Division's 11th Armored Cavalry Squadron was located at Landing Zone Sharon south of Quảng Trị.

In addition to its organic units the Division had operational control of the two Marine brigades of the general reserve. The 147th Marine Brigade was headquartered at Mai Loc Camp 2 km east of Camp Carroll and the 258th Brigade was at Firebase Nancy. The Marines and 56th Regiment presented a strong west-facing defense as this was assumed to be the most likely direction of attack.

On 30 March the 3rd Division was in the middle of rotating its units between the various defensive positions. The 56th Regiment was taking over Camp Carroll, Firebase Khe Gio and Firebase Fuller from the 2nd Regiment. The 57th Regiment was taking over the area from Đông Hà Combat Base north to the DMZ and east to the coast. The 2nd Regiment was taking over the combat bases north of Cam Lộ Combat Base. The commander of the 56th Regiment was Lieutenant Colonel Pham Van Dinh who had fought in the Battle of Huế and Operation Lam Son 719.

== Battle ==
The battle for Quảng Trị began at midday on 30 March with preparatory artillery barrages on the key areas of the province. Meanwhile, infantry assaults supported by tanks overran outposts and firebases. The lightning speed of the PAVN attacks on those positions delivered a great shock to the soldiers of the ARVN, who were largely unprepared for the onslaught.

=== Camp Carroll ===
During the first hours of the Easter Offensive, Camp Carroll was one of the first targets to come under the PAVN artillery barrage. The PAVN deployed a full artillery regiment against Camp Carroll with supporting infantry units, showing their full intention to take the camp. The PAVN and ARVN had exchanged artillery fire, but South Vietnamese resistance was gradually worn down as ARVN artillerymen began seeking shelter against the PAVN's devastatingly accurate 130mm guns. The PAVN launched several attacks, overrunning nearby posts at Khe Gio, Fuller and Nui Ba Ho. They also seized the military service road from Mai Loc through Camp Carroll to Cam Lộ, surrounding the base and making it dependent on aerial resupply. The PAVN defeated attempts to reopen Route 9, wiping out 2 companies and forcing the survivors back into the base. By the morning of 2 April Camp Carroll was completely surrounded by the PAVN.

Morale at Camp Carroll had dropped after suffering casualties and a perceived lack of fire support, as a result Dinh began negotiations with the PAVN and then informed his American advisors that the camp would surrender to the PAVN. As the senior advisor to the ARVN 56th Regiment, Lieutenant Colonel William Camper refused to go through with the surrender, he decided to leave Camp Carroll along with three officers and they were rescued by a US Army CH-47. On 2 April 1972, Camp Carroll was officially surrendered to the PAVN, with a white flag raised over the main gate of the camp. Fifteen hundred ARVN troops were captured along with 22 artillery pieces, including a six-gun battery of M107 175mm guns and numerous quad-50's and twin-40's, the largest artillery assemblage in I Corps. Following the surrender, a B-52 strike was ordered against Camp Carroll. However, it was too late as the PAVN had already moved the M107 guns out of the camp.

=== Đông Hà ===
On 30 March 1972 the 258th Marine Brigade was deployed to Đông Hà to support the 3rd Division. Early on the morning of 1 April the 4th Vietnamese Marine Corps Battalion abandoned Firebase Sarge and retreated to Mai Loc Camp. By 1 April the PAVN had broken through the ARVN defensive positions along the DMZ and north of the Cam Lo River and fragmented ARVN units and terrified civilians began withdrawing to Đông Hà.

Giai ordered a withdrawal of the 3rd Division south of the Cửa Việt River in order for his troops to reorganize a new defensive line: Regional and Popular Forces would secure the area from the coast to 5 km inland; the 57th Regiment would hold the area from there to Đông Hà; the 1st Armored Brigade including the 20th Tank Regiment would hold Đông Hà; the 2nd Regiment reinforced by an armored cavalry squadron would hold Cam Lộ, while the 56th Regiment supported by the 11th Armored Cavalry Squadron would hold Camp Carroll. Extending the line south the 147th Marine Brigade would hold Mai Loc and secure the high ground along Route 9 between Cam Lộ and Mai Loc.

By 11:00 on 2 April the ARVN 20th Tank Regiment moved forward to Đông Hà to support the 3rd Marine Battalion and 25th Marine Brigade in and around the town and defend the crucial road and rail bridges across the Cua Viet River. Marine ANGLICO units called in naval gunfire to hit PAVN forces near the bridges on the north bank of the river and destroyed four PT-76 amphibious tanks east of Đông Hà. More tanks were hit by a Republic of Vietnam Air Force (VNAF) A-1 Skyraider before it was shot down. At midday PAVN tanks attempted to force the road bridge, but six tanks were destroyed by fire from the ARVN 20th Tank's M48s. At approximately 13:00 Captain John Ripley an adviser to the Vietnamese Marines swung under the road bridge and spent three hours installing demolition charges to destroy the bridge. The bridge was blown up at 16:30 and the damaged railway bridge was destroyed around the same time temporarily halting the PAVN advance. Naval gunfire and a B-52 strike were soon directed at PAVN forces gathered on the northern bank. At 18:00 a USAF EB-66 was shot down west of Đông Hà and a no-fire zone was imposed around the area allowing the PAVN to capture the Cam Lo Bridge intact.

Over the next two weeks PAVN forces kept up a barrage of artillery, mortar and small arms fire on the ARVN positions and infiltrated small units across the river in boats. On 7 April the Marines withdrew from Đông Hà leaving the defense to the 1st ARVN Armored Brigade, 20th Tank Regiment, the 4th and 5th Ranger Groups and the 57th Regiment.

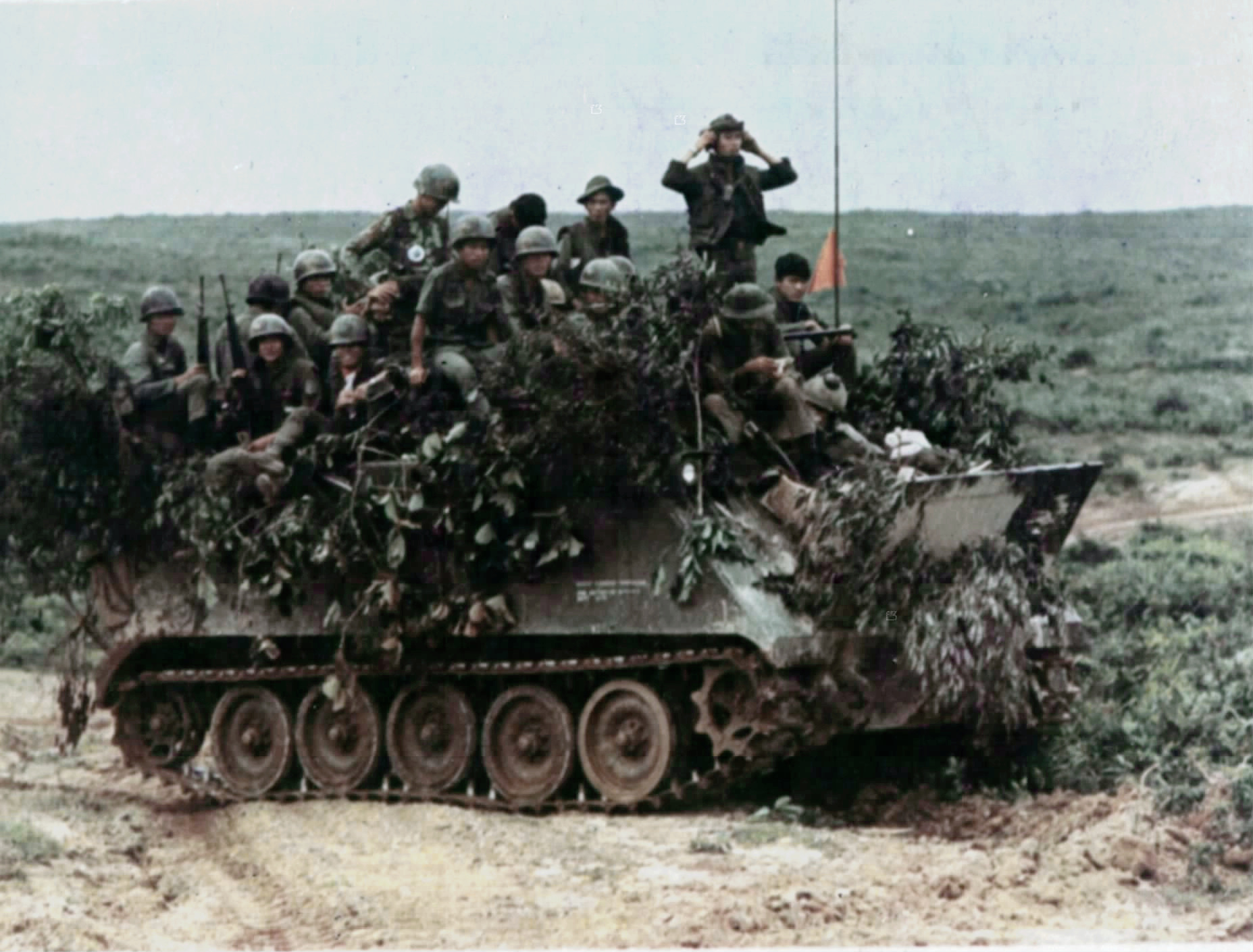
ARVN troops on an M113 move up towards the Dong Ha River, 10 April 1972

At dawn on 9 April the PAVN launched an attack, led by tanks, against Firebase Pedro southwest of Quảng Trị. The PAVN tanks had outrun their infantry support and 9 tanks were lost in a minefield around Pedro. An armored task force of eight M48s and 12 M113s from the ARVN 20th Tank Regiment were despatched from Ái Tử to support the Marines at Pedro. At the same time a flight of VNAF A-1 Skyraiders arrived overhead and destroyed five tanks. When the ARVN armor arrived they destroyed five T-54s for no losses and drove one captured Type 59 tank back to Ái Tử. On 10 and 11 April further PAVN attacks on Pedro were repulsed at a cost of over 200 PAVN estimated killed.

On 18 April the PAVN 308th Division attacking from the southwest attempted to outflank Đông Hà but were repulsed.

On 28 April the commander of the 20th Tank Regiment withdrew from Đông Hà to deal with a PAVN force threatening Ái Tử, seeing the tanks leaving the soldiers of the 57th Regiment panicked and abandoned their positions leading to the collapse of the ARVN defensive line. The VNMC 7th Battalion was sent to Ái Tử to help defend the base.

At 02:00 on 29 April the PAVN attacked the ARVN positions north and south of the base and the ARVN defenses began to crumble, by midday on 30 April Giai ordered a withdrawal from Ái Tử to a defensive line along the south of the Thạch Hãn River and the withdrawal was completed late that day.

=== Quảng Trị ===
On 1 May Giai decided that any further defense of the city was pointless and that the ARVN should withdraw to a defensive line along the Mỹ Chánh River. As the 3rd Division headquarters departed the city in an armored convoy, the U.S. advisors remained in the Quảng Trị Citadel, however the command element finding Highway 1 blocked by refugees and PAVN ambushes soon returned to the Citadel and requested helicopter evacuation. By late afternoon USAF helicopters from the 37th Aerospace Rescue and Recovery Squadron and Army helicopters evacuated all remaining forces in the Citadel. By 2 May all of Quảng Trị Province had fallen to the PAVN and they were threatening Huế. Approximately 2,000 South Vietnamese soldiers and civilian refugees were killed in the indiscriminate PAVN Shelling of Highway 1.

== Aftermath ==
The fall of Quảng Trị gave North Vietnam its first major victory of the 1972 offensive. The North Vietnamese immediately imposed their authority in the province, as collective farms were set up and strict rules were forced on the villagers. Many victims and villagers eventually fled. According to Gary D. Murfin, one of the lead writers to have done a survey on Vietnamese refugees after 1975, the province was an area of particularly dense Catholic concentration, many of whom were anti-communist. He estimated that 41% fled the area in fear of communist reprisals, 37% feared fighting, shelling, and bombing, and others fled because they were a family related to an ARVN soldier, or were at one point landowners.

While the North Vietnamese tried to consolidate their rule over the liberated zones, South Vietnamese General Ngô Quang Trưởng was drawing up a plan to retake the province. The stage was set for the Second Battle of Quảng Trị which would last from 28 June to 16 September 1972, where the ARVN would retake their positions. Although the North Vietnamese eventually lost most of southern Quảng Trị Province, the northern parts of the Province would remain in their control until the end of the war in 1975.

== See also ==
- Battle of Quang Tri (1968)
