= 312th Division (Vietnam) =

312th Infantry Division
- Active: 1950-present
- Allegiance: Vietnam
- Branch: Vietnam People's Army
- Type: Infantry
- Role: Mechanized infantry
- Size: Division
- Part of: 12th Corps
- Garrison/HQ: Xuan Mai, Chuong My, Hanoi, Vietnam
- Nickname: "Chien Thang" ("Victorious")
- Engagements: Battle of Vĩnh Yên; Battle of Mạo Khê; Battle of Hòa Bình; Battle of Nà Sản; Battle of Muong Khoua; Battle of Dien Bien Phu

Commanders
- Notable commanders: General Lê Trọng Tấn; LTG Trần Độ; CG Đàm Quang Trung; CG Hoàng Cầm

The 312th Infantry Division is a division of the People's Army of Vietnam (PAVN), first formed in October 1950. It was one of the 6 original "Iron and Steel" Divisions of the Viet Minh.

== First Indochina War ==
The 312th Division was formed in October 1950 and first saw action in January 1951 at the Battle of Vĩnh Yên.

In late April 1953 General Võ Nguyên Giáp ordered the 312th to threaten Luang Prabang, the division reached the outskirts of the capital on 30 April but were then withdrawn back into Tonkin.

In November 1953 the 312th was positioned near Phú Thọ to protect against any French action in the Red River region. On 24 December Giap ordered the 312th to move from Phú Thọ to Điện Biên Phủ and by mid January 1954 they were in position in the north-east of the valley.

Regiments 141 and 209 of the 312th led the initial attack of the Battle of Dien Bien Phu, overrunning Strongpoint Beatrice in five hours on the night of 13 March 1954. On the evening 14 March Regiment 165 of the 312th took part in the attack on Strongpoint Gabrielle with Regiment 88 of the 308th Division, by 9am on 15 March Gabrielle had been captured by the Viet Minh. On the night of 30 March Regiments 141 and 209 overran Strongpoints Dominique 2 and 1 respectively. On the night of 2 April Regiment 165 attacked Strongpoint Huguette 6 but was repulsed. On 1 May Regiment 141 was tasked with attacking Strongpoint Dominique 3 and by dawn on 2 May had successfully overrun the position. For the final assault on 6 May, the 312th was tasked with attacking the remaining Eliane strongpoints guarding the bridges across the Nam Youm river. Regiment 165 launched three assaults on Eliane 10 and each time they were repulsed and counter-attacked. Regiment 141 successfully captured Eliane 12 by midday on 7 May and Eliane 11 by 3pm. Units of the 312th crossed the Nam Youm on the afternoon of 7 May and moved towards the French central position. Total estimated losses among the 312th Division at the Battle of Dien Bien Phu are 2170 killed.

== Vietnam War ==
In June 1966 the Division's 141st and 165th Regiments were transferred to the 7th Infantry Division in the Phước Long area.

In early 1968 the Division's 209th Regiment was sent to reinforce the Central Highlands front.

In September 1969 the Division together with the 316th Division took part in Campaign 139 on the Plain of Jars in support of the Pathet Lao dry season offensive.

From 17 December 1971 to 30 January 1972 the Division and the 316th Division participated in Campaign Z in Laos.

On 12 July 1972 the Division together with the 325th Division was sent to support the Second Battle of Quảng Trị.

On 24 October 1973 the PAVN command formed 1st Corps, composed of the Division, the 308th and 338th Divisions, 367th Air Defense Division, 202nd Tank Brigade, 45th Artillery Brigade, 299th Engineer Brigade and the 204th Signal Regiment under the command of Major General Lê Trọng Tấn.

During the initial phases of the 1975 Spring Offensive, the 1st Corps was held in reserve, however following the Vietnamese Politburo decision to capitalise on the opportunity presented by the collapsing Army of the Republic of Vietnam (ARVN), in on 25 March it was ordered to join a general offensive against the South. On 1 April the Division departed Ninh Bình Province and began moving south, then turned west along Route 9 into Laos and down the Ho Chi Minh Trail. In late April the Division was located north of Saigon and on 30 April it captured Phu Loi Base Camp.

== Present Day ==
Today the division is part of the 12th Corps located in the Red River Delta.
