= 325th Division (Vietnam) =

325th Infantry Division
- Active: 1951-present
- Allegiance: Vietnam
- Branch: Vietnam People's Army
- Type: Infantry
- Role: Infantry
- Size: Division
- Part of: 12th Corps
- Garrison/HQ: Bắc Giang, Vietnam
- Nickname: Bình Trị Thiên
- Engagements: 1965–1967: Battle of Ia Drang; Battle of A Sau; Tet Offensive 1968: Battle of Lang Vei; Battle of Khe Sanh; Battle of Huế; Easter Offensive 1972: Second Battle of Quảng Trị; 1975 Spring Offensive: Hue-Da Nang Campaign; Fall of Saigon

Commanders
- Notable commanders: COL Trần Quý Hai; COL Nguyễn Hữu An; COL Trần Văn Trân; COL Chu Phương Đới

The 325th Infantry Division is a division of the People's Army of Vietnam (PAVN), first formed in March 1951 from independent units of Bình - Trị - Thiên. It was one of the six original regular divisions of the Viet Minh.

== First Indochina War ==
The 325th Infantry Division was first formed in March 1951 from independent regiments (18th, 95th, and 101st) of Bình - Trị - Thiên. It is likely that it only became fully operational in mid-1952. The division first commander cum commissar was Colonel Trần Quý Hai. It was one of the six original regular divisions of the Viet Minh.

In December 1953 the 325th took part in the Viet Minh probe into Laos.

In late December 1953 seven battalions from Regiment 101 of the 325th and Regiment 66 of the 304th Division moving from Vinh attacked isolated French outposts in the Annamite Range in Annam and Central Laos.

== Vietnam War ==
In early 1961 the Division was sent to Laos to support Pathet Lao forces and on 11 April captured Tchepone. This secured an essential area for the expansion of the Ho Chi Minh Trail.

In March 1964 the division was split into the 325A Division which was to begin preparations for moving to South Vietnam, while the 325B Division would rebuild in the North.

The Division's 95th Regiment arrived in Kon Tum Province in December 1964. In February 1965 the 95th was joined by the 101st Regiment. Coming along with the 101st (aka 101A) Regiment was the division commander - Sen. Col. Nguyễn Hữu An. A few months later, the third regiment - the 18th (aka 18A) also arrived but the division was actually dissolved: Col. An was appointed Deputy commander of the Central highlands Front (B3 Front), the 101A stayed in B3 Front while the 18A and the 95A moved to the 5th Military Region's lowlands (B1 Front).

In late 1965, following the Battle of Dak Sut, the 101A Regiment moved south to B2 Front; the 101B Regiment was deployed to B3 Front as a replacement unit and redesignated as the 33rd Regiment, subsequently taking part in the Siege of Plei Me and the Battle of Ia Drang.

In early March 1966, the 95B Regiment under the division deputy commander Trần Văn Trân attacked the A Shau Special Forces Camp of the US 5th Special Forces Group and the ARVN Special Forces, sufferring ~800 killed for allies ~300 killed.

U.S intelligence indicated that the 325C Division was operating in the Vietnamese Demilitarized Zone by July 1967. In its December 1967 PAVN order of battle, III MAF identified elements of three regiments of the 324B Division — the 812th, the 803rd, and 90th — and two of the regiments of the 325C Division — the 29th (18C) and 95C operating south of the Demilitarized Zone.

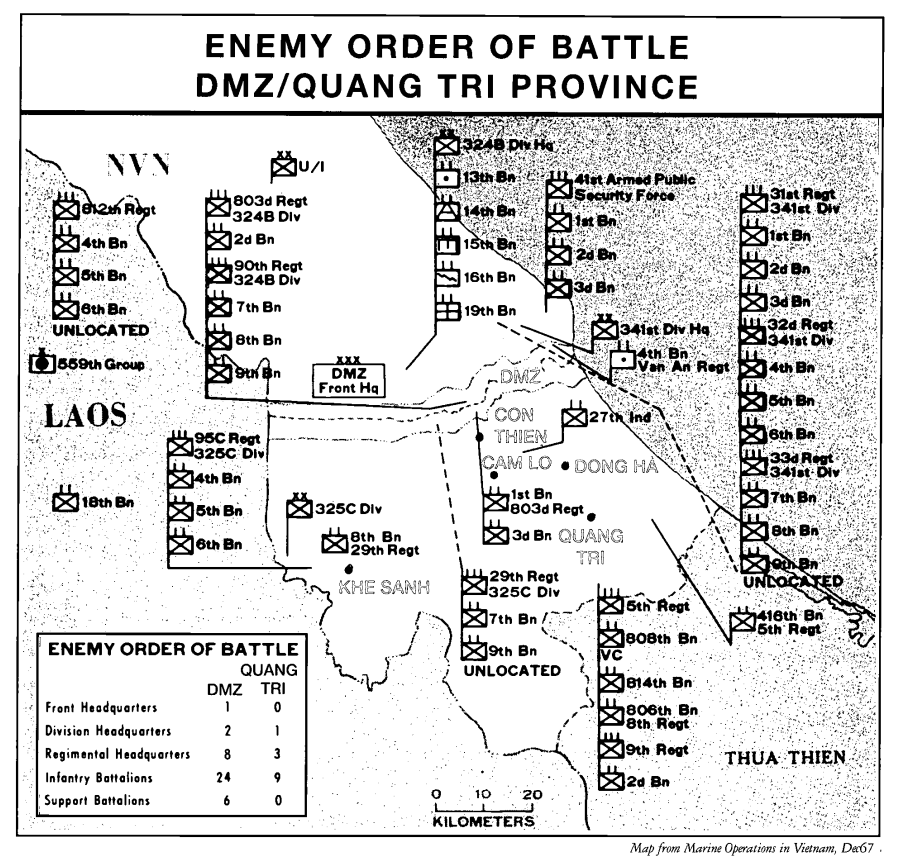
PAVN Order Of Battle in DMZ Dec 1967

In 20 January 1968, a PAVN rallier provided US intelligence officers detailed information concerning the 325C Division's plan for the attack and reduction of the Khe Sanh Combat Base before Tet. The 5th and 6th Battalions of the 95C Regiment was to capture Hill 1015 and Hill 861 respectively. The 4/95C Battalion had orders to coordinate with the 101D Regimen to attack the airstrip. The 29th Regiment was in reserve.

On 3 February 1968, a battalion of the 325C attacked the Marines on Hill 861A north of Khe Sanh Combat Base, the attack was repulsed with 7 Marines and 109 PAVN killed. On the night of 6/7 February, the division's 101D Regiment and two PT-76 tanks companies of the 198th Armored Battalion coordinated with the 24th Regiment of the 304th Division overran the US special forces camp at Lang Vei killing 316 of the camp's defenders including seven Americans for the loss of 90 PAVN killed and seven tanks destroyed. On 8 February a reinforced battalion of the 101D Regiment attacked a 9th Marines' position west of the Combat Base, 21 Marines and 150 PAVN were killed.

In April 1968, the 325C Division, comprising two regiments (95C and 101D) under commander Chu Phương Đới and commissar Trần Văn Ân arrived the Central Highlands to relieve the 1st Division on Route 18 - west of Kontum. Following the May Offensive, the 325C Division Headquarters returned to the North, its 95C and 101D Regiments shifted to independent operations under the command of the B3 Front, subsequently coordinating with the 66th Regiment of the 1st Division at Đức Lập during the August Offensive.

On 12 July 1972, the Division with three regiments (18th, 95th and 101st) under commander Lê Kích and commissar Nguyễn Công Trang, together with the 312th Division was sent to support the Second Battle of Quảng Trị.

On 15 May 1974 the Division's 95th Regiment attacked Dak Pek Camp overrunning one of the last Army of the Republic of Vietnam (ARVN) bases on Route 14.

On 17 May 1974 PAVN 2nd Corps was formed comprising the Division, the 304th and 324th Divisions, the 673rd Air Defense Division, the 164th Artillery Brigade, the 203rd tank Brigade, the 219th Engineer Brigade and the 463rd Signal Regiment under the command of Major General Hoàng Văn Thái.

As part of the Hue-Da Nang Campaign on 19 March the Division and the 324th Division attacked the ARVN 1st Division and the 15th Ranger Group along Route 1 south of Huế. On the afternoon of 22 March the 324th pushed the 15th Rangers out of Phú Lộc cutting Route 1 and forcing the ARVN forces to withdraw back to a defensive line around Phu Bai Combat Base On 24 March all ARVN forces were ordered to abandon Huế and regroup in Danang, a disorganised seaborne evacuation followed and by 25 March the PAVN was in control of the city.

For the attack on Danang, by 26 March the Division advanced from the north, the 9th Regiment of the 304th was located northwest of Danang, while the rest of the 304th and 711th Divisions encircled from the south and the 3rd Regiment of the 324th was located southwest of the city. By the afternoon of 29 March the 2nd Corps had penetrated the ARVN defences and entered the city which finally fell on 31 March.

On 16 April the Division's 101st Regiment captured Phan Rang and then after defeating several ARVN counterattacks captured Phan Rang Air Base. On 18 April the Division's 18th Regiment captured Phan Thiết.

By 26 April the Division and the 304th Division were attacking Route 15, the last overland link between Saigon and Vung Tau. On 29 April the Division attacked Nhơn Trạch District, Thuy Ha and Cat Lai southwest of Saigon.

== Present Day ==
Today the division remains part of the 12th Corps.
