= 12th Corps (Vietnam) =

Army Corps 12
- Quân đoàn 12
- Logo
- Active: 21 November 2023 – present
- Country: Vietnam
- Branch: Active duty
- Type: Army Corps
- Role: Regular force
- Size: Corps
- Part of: People's Army of Vietnam
- Garrison/HQ: Tam Điệp, Ninh Bình
- Mottos: THẦN TỐC - QUYẾT CHIẾN - QUYẾT THẮNG lit. 'Lighting speed - Determined to fight - Determined to win'
- Flag

Commanders
- Current commander: Lieutenant General Lê Xuân Thuân
- Political commissar: Major General Trần Đại Thắng

12th Corps or officially the Army Corps 12 (Vietnamese: Quân đoàn 12) is one of the two regular army corps of the People's Army of Vietnam (PAVN). It was formed in November 2023 as a merger of the 1st and 2nd Corps. The corps is stationed in Tam Điệp, Ninh Bình.

== History ==
On 21 October 2023, Vietnam's Defense Minister Phan Văn Giang announced the decision to merge the 1st and 2nd Corps to form the 12th Corps. One month later, he signed the Decision No. 6012/QĐ-BQP, officially created the 12th Corps. On 28 November 2023, the inaugural meeting of the 12th Corps Party Committee was convened to debate the matter of assembling the subordinate units and personnel of the new corps.

On 23 December 2023, a large-scale exercise was conducted by the newly established 12th Corps under the observation of Vietnamese Prime Minister Phạm Minh Chính. By the end of 2023, Major General Trương Mạnh Dũng announced that the rate of combat-ready troops of the corps' units reached 95%.

== Organisation ==
On 29 November 2023, units of the 1st Corps and the 2nd Corps was merged to form the 12th Corps:

=== Headquarters ===
- Department of Staff
  - 702nd Guard Battalion
  - 701st Reconnaissance Battalion
  - 703rd Artillery Command Battalion
  - 36th Electronic Warfare Battalion
  - 21st Chemical Defense Battalion
- Department of Politics
  - 12th Corps Military Procuracy
  - 12th Corps Regional Military Procuracy
- Department of Logistics - Technical
  - 752nd Transportation Regiment (ZIL-130 and newer Kamaz trucks)
  - 879th Composite Repair Battalion
  - 569th Logistics - Technical Warehouse
  - 5th Military Hospital
- 12th Corps Military School
  - 1st Training Battalion
  - 2nd Training Battalion

=== Combat forces ===
- 308th Division
  - 36th Infantry Regiment
  - 88th Infantry Regiment
  - 102nd Mechanized Infantry Regiment (BMP-1)
  - 58th Artillery Regiment (D-30)
  - 14th Artillery Battalion (100mm mortars)
  - 15th Anti-tank Battalion (SPG-9)
  - 16th Air Defense Battalion (DShK)
  - 17th Engineer Battalion
  - 18th Signals Battalion
  - 24th Medical Battalion
  - 25th Transportation Battalion
  - 20th Reconnaissance Company
  - 26th Repair Company
  - 29th Storage Company
- 312th Division
  - 141st Infantry Regiment
  - 165th Infantry Regiment
  - 209th Infantry Regiment
  - 1037th Tank Battalion (T-54/T-55)
  - 68th Artillery Regiment (2S1, 2S3, BM-21)
  - 14th Artillery Battalion (100mm mortars)
  - 15th Anti-tank Battalion (SPG-9)
  - 16th Air Defense Battalion (DShK)
  - 17th Engineer Battalion
  - 18th Signals Battalion
  - 24th Medical Battalion
  - 25th Transportation Battalion (KAMAZ truck)
- 325th Division
  - 18th Infantry Regiment
  - 95th Infantry Regiment
  - 101st Infantry Regiment
  - 14th Artillery Battalion (100mm mortars)
  - 16th Air Defense Battalion
  - 17th Engineer Battalion
  - 24th Medical Battalion
- 390th Division
  - 27th Infantry Regiment
  - 48th Infantry Regiment
  - 64th Infantry Regiment
  - 17th Engineer Battalion
- 203rd Tank Brigade
  - 1st Tank Battalion (T-54/T-55, T-54M)
  - 2nd Tank Battalion (T-54/T-55)
  - 3rd Armored Battalion
  - 20th Reconnaissance Company
  - 17th Engineer Company
- 241st Air Defense Brigade
  - 24th Air Defense Battalion (Type 65)
  - 37th Air Defense Battalion
  - 39th Air Defense Battalion (AZP S-60)
- 673rd Air Defense Brigade
  - 1st Air Defense Battalion (AZP S-60)
  - 2nd Air Defense Battalion
  - 3rd Air Defense Battalion (Type 65)
  - 4th Air Defense Battalion (Type 65)
- 164th Artillery Brigade
  - 1st Artillery Battalion (D-20 howitzer)
  - 2nd Artillery Battalion (D-30 howitzer)
  - 3rd Artillery Battalion (BM-21 MLRS)
- 368th Artillery Brigade
  - 1st Artillery Battalion (D-20 howitzer)
  - 2nd Artillery Battalion (D-30 howitzer)
  - 3rd Artillery Battalion (BM-21 MLRS)
  - Command Company
- 140th Signals Regiment
  - 1st Signals Battalion
  - 2nd Signals Battalion
- 299th Engineer Brigade (PTS amphibious vehicle, PMP floating bridge)
  - 1st Engineer Battalion
  - 2nd Engineer Battalion
  - 3rd Engineer Battalion

== Commanders ==
Time	Commander	Notes
05/2025–present	Maj. Gen. Lê Xuân Thuân	
11/2023–05/2025	Maj. Gen. Trương Mạnh Dũng	
