= Lê Trọng Tấn =

Vietnamese politician and army officer

Army general Lê Trọng Tấn
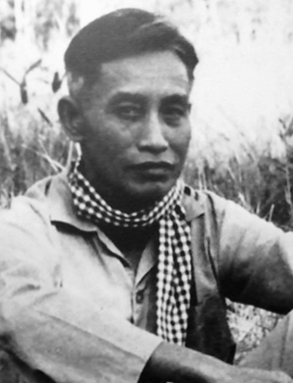
- Lê Trọng Tấn during the First Indochina War

3rd Chief of General Staff
- In office 1978–1986
- Preceded by: Văn Tiến Dũng
- Succeeded by: Lê Đức Anh

Personal details
- Born: Lê Trọng Tố; 1 October 1914 Hoài Đức, Tonkin
- Died: 5 December 1986 (aged 72) Hanoi, Vietnam
- Party: Communist Party of Vietnam (1943–1986)
- Awards: Gold Star Order (posthumously); Ho Chi Minh Order; Military Exploit Order; Resolution for Victory Order (2); Resistance Order
- Nickname(s): Ba Long "The Vietnamese Zhukov"

Military service
- Allegiance: Viet Minh; Vietnam
- Branch/service: Vietnam People's Army; Viet Cong
- Years of service: 1945–1986
- Rank: Army General
- Commands: Deputy Minister of Defence of Vietnam; Chief of the General Staff; Deputy Commander of the Viet Cong; Director of the National Academy of Defence
- Battles/wars: First Indochina War; Battle of Điện Biên Phủ; Laotian Civil War; Operation Lam Son 719; Campaign Z; Vietnam War; Operation Junction City; Easter Offensive; Hue–Da Nang Campaign; 1975 spring offensive; Cambodian–Vietnamese War

Lê Trọng Tấn (Vietnamese pronunciation: [le˧˧ t͡ɕawŋ͡m˧˨ʔ tən˧˦]; 1 October 1914 – 5 December 1986) was an officer of the People's Army of Vietnam (PAVN) during 1945 to 1986. During this period of his military career, Lê Trọng Tấn held several senior positions of the Army. Lê Trọng Tấn participated in the Viet Minh movement before the August Revolution in 1945 and gradually became one of the most important figures of the Vietnam People's Army during the Second Indochina War. Being one of the key figures of the North Vietnam armed forces in Vietnam War, Lê Trọng Tấn was Deputy Commander of the Viet Cong (VC) and second commander of the 1975 Spring Offensive that effectively ended the war. Afterwards, he became Chief of the General Staff and Deputy Minister of Defence of Vietnam until his death in December 1986. Lê Trọng Tấn was widely appreciated by his comrades, whom of which include general Võ Nguyên Giáp, as one of the finest commanders of the Vietnam People's Army.

== Early life ==
Lê Trọng Tấn was born on 1 October 1914 as Lê Trọng Tố (Vietnamese pronunciation: [le˧˧ t͡ɕawŋ͡m˧˨ʔ to˧˦]), his father was a scholar who once participated in the Tonkin Free School movement before retiring in the village Yên Nghĩa, Hoài Đức and died when Lê Trọng Tố was 7 years old. He was a descendant of Trịnh Căn, a Trịnh lord who ruled Vietnam, according to a genealogical record for the Trịnh family. In his youth, Lê Trọng Tố studied at Bưởi High School and was known for his football skill that gained him a position in the Eclair football club in Hanoi. Lê Trọng Tố was admitted to the Viet Minh in late 1943 and became the military deputy of the revolution committee in his hometown Hà Đông during the August Revolution (1945). After Viet Minh took over the authorities, Lê Trọng Tố enlisted in the PAVN (Cứu quốc quân) and changed his name to Lê Trọng Tấn.

== In Indochina War ==
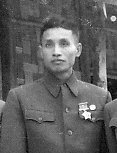
Lê Trọng Tấn in December 1954

In late 1949, the PAVN General Command formed its two original regular regiments: the 174th (Cao Bắc Lạng) and the 209th (Sông Lô). Lê Trọng Tấn was appointed commander of the 209th, alongside Trần Độ—the political commissar.

In the Biên giới Campaign (1950), Lê Trọng Tấn was the deputy commander of the PAVN at Đông Khê front, later he became the first commander of the 312th Brigade and led his brigade engaging in the Battle of Dien Bien Phu. From 1954 to 1960, Lê Trọng Tấn was appointed Director of the Vietnam Academy for Infantry Officers and Deputy Chief of the General Staff (Phó Tổng tham mưu trưởng) from March 1961 to 1962.

== In Vietnam War ==
In October 1964, Maj. Gen. Lê Trọng Tấn was assigned to South Vietnam to serve as Deputy Commander of the Liberation Army of South Vietnam (LASV or PLAF). Accompanying him were Gen. Nguyễn Chí Thanh - COSVN Secretary cum LASV Commissar, Maj. Gen. Trần Độ - Deputy Commissar, Col. Hoàng Cầm and several seasoned mid and high-ranking officers.

During two years 1970 and 1971, Lê Trọng Tấn was the special envoy of the PAVN at the Laos front where he commanded troops in the Campaign Z. In 1972 he was appointed commander of PAVN in the First Battle of Quảng Trị, one year later he returned to the position of Deputy Chief of the General Staff and held at the same time the position of commander of the 1st Corps (Quân đoàn 1) and Director of the Military Science Academy. In 1975, Lê Trọng Tấn was commander of the Hue-Da Nang Campaign in March 1975 and second commander (Phó tư lệnh) of the 1975 Spring Offensive. During the last days of the 1975 Spring Offensive, Lê Trọng Tấn was responsible for the east wing of the PAVN attacking Saigon. It was the 4th Company of 1st Regiment, 2nd Corps under his command that arrived first at the Independence Palace, the workplace of the President of the South Vietnam, and arrested the president Duong Van Minh coincidentally it was also a unit of the 312th Brigade commanding by Lê Trọng Tấn which was first came to the French headquarters and captured general Christian de Castries marking the end of the Battle of Dien Bien Phu.

== After Reunification Day ==
After the Vietnam War, Lê Trọng Tấn continued to hold the position of Deputy Chief of the General Staff and Director of the Advanced Military Academy (Học viện Quân sự cấp cao). At the beginning of the Cambodian–Vietnamese War, Lê Trọng Tấn was commander of Vietnamese armed forces in the southern border of Vietnam from December 1978 to February 1979. From June 1978 to his death in 1986, Lê Trọng Tấn was Deputy Minister of Defence of Vietnam and Chief of the General Staff of the PAVN, succeeding general Văn Tiến Dũng. He died on 5 December 1986 at the age of 72.

== Awards, decorations and legacy ==
During his military career, Lê Trọng Tấn was awarded various titles, medals and decorations including the Ho Chi Minh Order (Huân chương Hồ Chí Minh, posthumously), the Gold Star Order (Huân chương Sao vàng), the 1st and 3rd grade Military Order (Huân chương Quân công) and the 1st grade Victory Medal (Huân chương Chiến thắng). Several streets and places in Vietnam are named in honour of Lê Trọng Tấn.

Among his comrades in the PAVN, Lê Trọng Tấn was highly appreciated for his skill in commanding and military knowledge. The general Võ Nguyên Giáp considered Lê Trọng Tấn one of the finest military commanders of Vietnam, Fidel Castro once called him "the best general of Vietnam" and in Vietnam he was sometimes dubbed the "Vietnamese Zhukov".
