= 1st Corps (Vietnam) =

Quân đoàn 1 (1st Corps)
- Active: 24 October 1973 – 21 November 2023
- Country: Vietnam
- Allegiance: People's Army of Vietnam
- Branch: Active duty
- Type: Army Corps
- Role: Regular force
- Size: Corps
- Part of: People's Army of Vietnam
- Garrison/HQ: Tam Điệp, Ninh Bình
- Engagements: Vietnam War
- Decorations: Hero of the People's Armed Forces; Ho Chi Minh Order; Order of Independence; Military Exploit Order; Feat Order

Commanders
- Current commander: Major General Trương Mạnh Dũng
- Deputy Commander and Chief of Staff Commander: Senior Colonel Nguyễn Trung Hiếu
- First party committee secretary: Major General Nguyễn Đức Hưng

1st Corps (Vietnamese: Quân đoàn 1) or Quyết thắng Corps (Vietnamese: Binh đoàn Quyết thắng, literally: Determined Victory Corps) was a regular army corps of the People's Army of Vietnam (PAVN). First organised in 1973 during the Vietnam War, 1st Corps had a major role in the 1975 spring offensive that ended the war. Before disbanding on 21 November 2023, the corps was stationed in Tam Điệp, Ninh Bình.

== History ==
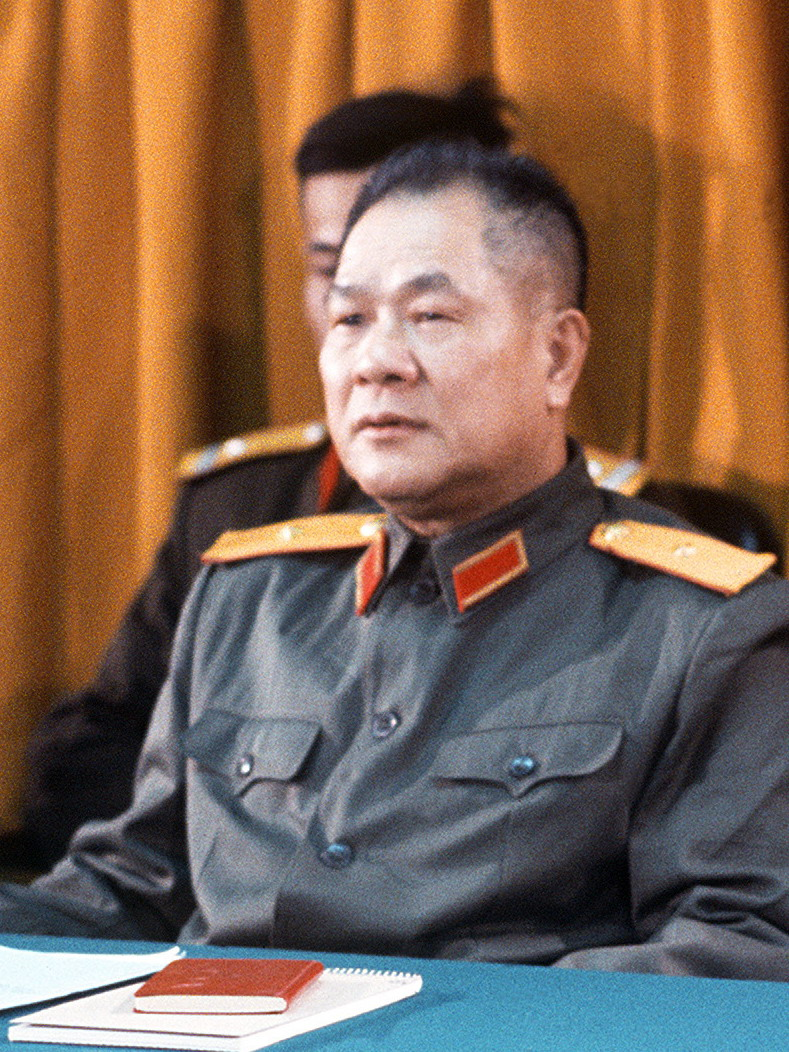
Major General Lê Quang Hòa, the first committee secretary of the 1st Corps.

In 1972, after the failure of the air raid in Operation Linebacker II, the Federal government of the United States was forced to sign the Paris Peace Accords, according to which in 1973 the United States had to withdraw all troops home. However, the military situation in 4th Military Region of the People's Army of Vietnam is also unfavorable. The Central Military Commission of the Communist Party of Vietnam sent a few divisions that were suffering heavy losses to the North to reinforce.

In July 1973, the Central Committee of the Communist Party of Vietnam after its 21st conference issued a resolution of strengthening the armed forces to unify the country. In executing the issue, three months later the Ministry of Defence and the Central Military Commission approved the plan of organising regular army corps for the Vietnam People's Army. On 24 October 1973, General Võ Nguyên Giáp, Minister of Defence, signed the edict No. 142/QĐ-QP that led to the establishment of the 1st Corps in Tam Điệp, Ninh Bình. The first headquarters of the corps was composed of party committee secretary (bí thư) Lê Quang Hòa and commander (tư lệnh) and deputy secretary Lê Trọng Tấn.

After the PAVN victory in the Battle of Ban Me Thuot in March 1975, 1st Corps was ordered to move to Southern Vietnam and participate in the 1975 spring offensive. During the last days of the war, 1st Corps had a major role in the attack on Saigon, in which it was assigned the mission of capturing the headquarters of the Joint General Staff. The corps was awarded the title Hero of the People's Armed Forces (Anh hùng Lực lượng vũ trang nhân dân) in 1985.

== Development process ==
According to the decision of the Ministry of Defence, the organisational structure of the Corps includes: Corps Command. Three corps agencies: the General Staff, the Political Bureau, and the Logistics Department. Units upon establishment: 308th Infantry Division, 312th Division, 320B Infantry Division (later changed to 390th Division), 367th Air Defense Division, 202nd Tank-Armored Brigade, 45th Brigade Artillery, 299th Engineer Brigade and 140th Information Regiment.

On 15 March 1975, while the Battle of Ban Me Thuot was gaining a crushing victory. 1st Corps was ordered to move into Southern Vietnam ready to fight. In just 12 days and nights, the entire formation of the corps (except for the 308th Division soldier who remained in Northern Vietnam on diversionary duty), had traveled over a distance of 1,789 km from the North to the South along the Ho Chi Minh trail, in time to enter the war zone directly participated in the fighting in the North of Saigon. After that, the corps moved into the battlefield along Highway 1 – Road 9 – through Lao Bao to Laotian territory – back to Kon Tum along route 14 through Buon Ma Thuot, on 14 April 1975 to Dong Xoai – Phuoc Long prepares for the final battle. During the Ho Chi Minh Campaign, Army Corps 1 received the task of attacking from the North of Saigon, encircling and destroying the enemy in Phú Lợi, Bến Cát, Bình Dương, Lai Khê, Tân Uyên; prevent the Army of the Republic of Vietnam's 5th Division from withdrawing to the inner city and neutralize this unit; attacked and captured the Chief of the Joint General Staff, the army command posts in Gò Vấp, Bình Thạnh; organized a combined attack force with other corps at the Independence Palace. Due to the urgent need to march from the North by all means of water, land and air. 1st Corps started the attack a day later than the other units.

== Organisation ==
The corps organisation before merged with the 2nd Corps to form the 12th Corps on 29 November 2023:

=== Headquarters ===
- Department of Staff
  - 701st Reconnaissance Battalion
  - 140th Signals Battalion
  - 21st Chemical Defense Battalion
- Department of Politics
- Department of Logistics
  - 752nd Transportation Battalion
  - Two Logistics Warehouse Companies
- Department of Technicals
  - Two Technicals Warehouse Battalions

=== Combat forces ===
- 308th Division
  - 36th Infantry Regiment
  - 88th Infantry Regiment
  - 102nd Mechanized Infantry Regiment (BMP-2)
  - 58th Artillery Regiment
- 312th Division
  - 141st Infantry Regiment
  - 165th Infantry Regiment
  - 209th Infantry Regiment
  - 14th Artillery Battalion (100mm mortars)
- 390th Division
  - 27th Infantry Regiment
  - 48th Infantry Regiment
  - 64th Infantry Regiment
- 241st Air Defense Brigade (Type 65 anti-aircraft guns)
- 368th Artillery Brigade
  - D-20 howitzer battery
  - D-30 howitzer battery
  - BM-21 battery
- 299th Engineer Brigade (PTS amphibious vehicle, PMP floating bridge)
- 1st Corps Military School

== Commanders ==
Time	Commander	Notes
1973–1974	Maj. Gen. Lê Trọng Tấn	Later promoted to general and Chief of the General Staff of the Vietnam People's Army.
1974–1975	Maj. Gen. Nguyễn Hòa	Later promoted to lieutenant general and Member of the Central Committee of the Communist Party of Vietnam.
1979–1983	Maj. Gen. Lê Nam Phong	
1983–1988	Maj. Gen. Nguyễn Kiệm	
1988–1995	Maj. Gen. Nguyễn Huy Hiệu	Later promoted to Colonel General and Deputy Minister of Defence of Vietnam.
1995–1997	Maj. Gen. Đỗ Trung Dương	Later promoted to lieutenant general and Deputy Chief of the General Staff.
1997–1998	Maj. Gen. Nguyễn Khắc Nghiên	Later promoted to Colonel General and Chief of the General Staff.
1998–2002	Se. Col. Nguyễn Xuân Sắc	Later promoted to major general and Deputy Director of the Military Academy of Politics.
2002–2005	Maj. Gen. Phan Khuê Tảo	
2005–2007	Maj. Gen. Tô Đình Phùng	
2007–2009	Maj. Gen. Trần Quốc Phú	
2009–2010	Maj. Gen. Trần Anh Vinh	
2010–2011	Maj. Gen. Phan Văn Giang	Later promoted to Army General, Chief of the General Staff (2016–2021), Minister of Defense (2021–2026)
2011–5/2013	Maj. Gen. Nguyễn Tân Cương	Later promoted to Colonel General and Chief of the General Staff
5/2013–2015	Maj. Gen. Trần Việt Khoa	Later promoted to Colonel General and Director of National Defense Academy
2015–1/2018	Maj. Gen. Trần Duy Giang	
1/2015–4/2020	Maj. Gen. Doãn Thái Đức	
4/2020–12/2021	Maj. Gen. Đỗ Minh Xương	
12/2021–11/2023	Maj. Gen. Trương Mạnh Dũng	
