= Vũ Nam Long =

Vietnamese general (1921–1999)

Lieutenant General Vũ Nam Long

Personal details
- Born: Đoàn Văn Ưu; 1921 Hòa An, Cao Bằng, Tonkin (French protectorate)
- Died: 1999 (aged 77–78)
- Party: Communist Party of Vietnam
- Education: Whampoa Military Academy

Military service
- Allegiance: Democratic Republic of Vietnam and later Vietnam
- Branch/service: People's Army of Vietnam
- Rank: Lieutenant General
- Battles/wars: First Indochina War; Battle of Đông Khê; Battle of Điện Biên Phủ; Vietnam War

Vũ Nam Long (born Đoàn Văn Ưu) (1921–1999) was a lieutenant-general in the People's Army of Vietnam active during the First Indochina War and Vietnam War.

== Career ==
He was born on October 8, 1921, in De Tham commune, Hoa An district, Cao Bang province (now De Tham ward, Cao Bang city).

In 1941, he was sent to study at the Whampoa Military Academy (China).

He joined the Vietnam Propaganda Liberation Army Team and was admitted to the Indochinese Communist Party in January 1945.

By August 1945, he was appointed as the company commander of the unit protecting President Ho Chi Minh. After the August Revolution, he served as a battalion commander advancing south to fight in the South Central and Southern regions.

In April 1946, he held several positions: Regiment Commander of Hai Duong Regiment, Regiment Commander of Regiment 59, Regiment Commander of Regiment 36, member of Zone 12; Regiment Commander of Regiment 141 – Division 312; Deputy Commander of the Lang Son Front, and Party Committee member of the Front.

Between 1953 and 1955, he was appointed to the following roles: Chief of Staff of Division 304, Party Committee member of the Division; Division Commander of Division 304.

In 1956, he was sent to study at the Soviet General Staff Military Academy.

In 1958, he returned to Vietnam and was appointed Deputy Commander and Chief of Staff of the Artillery Command.

From 1961 to 1973, he held various positions: Deputy Commander of the Left Bank Military Zone; Deputy Commander, then Commander of Military Zone 4; Deputy Commander of the Tri-Thien Military Zone.

In 1974, he was appointed deputy director of the Military Academy (now the Army Academy).

In April 1975, he served as a special envoy of the Ministry of National Defense, participating in the Ho Chi Minh Campaign.

In 1977, he was appointed deputy director of the Senior Military Academy (now the National Defense Academy).

He retired in 1988.

He was promoted to the rank of Colonel in 1958, Major General in 1974, and Lieutenant General in 1981.

He was awarded the Ho Chi Minh Order and many other prestigious medals.

He died on July 1, 1999.

In 2007, a bronze bust of Lieutenant General Nam Long was sculpted and presented to the Military Museum and to Cao Bang province, his hometown.
