= 2nd Corps (Vietnam) =

Vietnamese military unit

Quân đoàn 2 (2nd Corps)
- Active: 17 May 1974 – 21 November 2023
- Country: Vietnam
- Allegiance: Vietnam People's Army
- Branch: Active duty
- Type: Army Corps
- Role: Regular force
- Size: Corps
- Part of: Vietnam People's Army
- Garrison/HQ: Lạng Giang, Bắc Giang
- Engagements: Vietnam War; Cambodian–Vietnamese War; Sino–Vietnamese War
- Decorations: Hero of the People's Armed Forces

Commanders
- Current commander: Major General Phạm Văn Hưng
- Deputy Commander and Chief of Staff Commander: Senior Colonel Nguyễn Thành Phố
- First party committee secretary: Major General Trần Danh Khải

2nd Corps (Vietnamese: Quân đoàn 2) or Hương Giang Corps (Vietnamese: Binh đoàn Hương Giang, literally: Corps of the Perfume River) was a regular army corps of the Vietnam People's Army. First organised in 1974 during the Vietnam War, 2nd Corps had a major role in the Ho Chi Minh Campaign that ended the war. Before disbanding on 21 November 2023, the corps was stationed in Lạng Giang District, Bắc Giang.

== History ==
In July 1973, the Central Committee of the Communist Party of Vietnam after its 21st conference issued a resolution of strengthening the armed forces to unify the country. In executing the issue, three months later the Ministry of Defence and the Military Commission of the Central Committee approved the plan of organising regular army corps for the Vietnam People's Army. On 17 May 1974, General Võ Nguyên Giáp, Minister of Defence, signed the edict that led to the establishment of the 2nd Corps in Thừa Thiên, now Thừa Thiên–Huế Province, where is located the Perfume River (Sông Hương or Hương Giang), that came the name Hương Giang Corps of the unit. The first headquarters of the corps consisted of political commissar (chính ủy) Lê Linh and commander (tư lệnh) Hoàng Văn Thái.

In early 1975, 2nd Corps was a major force of the Vietnam People's Army in Hue-Da Nang and Tây Nguyên Campaign. During the Ho Chi Minh Campaign, it was 2nd Corps that first advanced in the city of Saigon and captured the Independence Palace, which was the workplace of the president Duong Van Minh of South Vietnam. Colonel Bùi Quang Thận, then a captain in the 2nd Corps, was the person who raised the flag of Liberation Army in the roof of the Independence Palace and marked the end of the Vietnam War. After the war, 2nd Corps continued to engage in Laos (1976–1979) and Cambodian–Vietnamese War (1978–1979). The corps was awarded the title Hero of the People's Armed Forces (Anh hùng Lực lượng vũ trang nhân dân) in 1985.

== Organisation ==
The corps organisation before merged with the 1st Corps to form the 12th Corps on 29 November 2023:

=== Headquarters ===
- Department of Staff
  - 19th Commando Battalion
  - 463rd Signals Battalion
  - 5th Chemical Defense Battalion (Zil-131 ARS-14)
- Department of Politics
- Department of Logistics
  - 32nd Transportation Battalion
  - Two Logistics Warehouse Companies
- Department of Technicals
  - Two Technicals Warehouse Battalions

=== Combat forces ===
- 325th Division
  - 18th Infantry Regiment
  - 95th Infantry Regiment
  - 101st Infantry Regiment
- 673rd Air Defence Brigade (AZP S-60)
- 203rd Tank Brigade (T-54/T-55)
- 164th Artillery Brigade

== Commanders ==
Time	Commander	Notes
1974–1975	Maj. Gen. Hoàng Văn Thái	Later promoted to lieutenant general and director of the General Department of Technique.
1975–1979	Maj. Gen. Nguyễn Hữu An	Later promoted to colonel general and director of the Advanced Military Academy.
1979–1982	Maj. Gen. Nguyễn Chơn	
1983–1988	Maj. Gen. Bùi Công Ái	
1988–1992	Maj. Gen. Nguyễn Phúc Thanh	Later promoted to lieutenant general, Deputy Minister of Defence of Vietnam and Deputy President of the National Assembly of Vietnam.
1992–1994	Maj. Gen. Nguyễn Văn Rinh	Later promoted to colonel general and Deputy Minister of Defence.
1995–2000	Maj. Gen. Phạm Xuân Thệ	Later promoted to lieutenant general and commander of the 1st Military Region.
2000–2004	Maj. Gen. Phạm Ngọc Khóa	Later promoted to lieutenant general and director of the Department of Operation, General Staff.
2004–2007	Maj. Gen. Thiều Chí Đinh	
2007–2011	Maj. Gen. Nguyễn Đức Thận	
2011–11/2023	Maj. Gen. Phạm Văn Hưng	

== Notes ==
- High Command of the 2nd Corps, Vietnam People's Army (2004). History of the 2nd Corps (1974–2004) (in Vietnamese). Hanoi: People's Army Publishing House.
