= 711th Division (Vietnam) =

711th Infantry Division
- Active: November 1971 - June 1973
- Allegiance: Vietnam
- Branch: People's Army of Vietnam
- Type: Infantry
- Role: Infantry
- Size: Division

The 711th Infantry Division was a division of the People's Army of Vietnam (PAVN), first formed in early 1972.

== Vietnam War ==
The Division was initially formed from the 31st and 32nd Regiments in early 1972 and the 97th Regiment was added to it in May 1972.

On 19 August 1972, the ARVN 5th Infantry Regiment, 2nd Division abandoned Firebase Ross in the Que Son Valley, 30 miles (48 km) southwest of Da Nang, to the Division. A dozen BGM-71 TOW missiles were left with abandoned equipment and fell into PAVN hands. The ARVN 4th Regiment recaptured Ross on 9 September 1972.

In the 1975 Spring Offensive on the morning of 24 March the Division, backed by armored elements, seized Tam Kỳ, driving the population north toward Da Nang.
