= Battle of Ban Me Thuot =

Battle of the Vietnam War (1975)

Coordinates: 12.68°N 108.06°E

- Part of the 1975 spring offensive in the Vietnam War
- A Vietnam People's Army T-54 tank during operations in the Central Highlands
Date	March 3–18, 1975 (2 weeks and 1 day)
Location	Ban Mê Thuột, Đắk Lắk Province, South Vietnam
Result	North Vietnamese victory

Belligerents
South Vietnam	North Vietnam; Viet Cong

Commanders and leaders
Phạm Văn Phú; Trần Văn Cẩm	Hoàng Minh Thảo; Vũ Lăng

Strength
78,300 soldiers 488 tanks 374 artillery pieces 134 fighter-bombers 250 helicopters 101 reconnaissance aircraft	65,141 soldiers 57 tanks 679 vehicles 88 heavy artillery pieces 343 anti-aircraft guns 1,561 anti-tank guns or recoilless guns

Casualties and losses
About 3/4 of all soldiers were killed, wounded, missing or captured. Vast quantities of military hardware were lost.	800 killed 2,416 wounded

The Battle of Ban Me Thuot was a decisive battle of the Vietnam War which led to the complete destruction of South Vietnam's II Corps Tactical Zone. The battle was part of a larger North Vietnamese military operation known as Campaign 275 to capture the Tay Nguyen region, known in the West as the Vietnamese Central Highlands.

In March 1975 the People's Army of Vietnam (PAVN) staged a large-scale offensive, known as Campaign 275, with the aim of capturing the Central Highlands from the Army of the Republic of Vietnam (ARVN) in order to kick-start the first stage of the 1975 spring offensive. Within ten days, the North Vietnamese destroyed most ARVN military formations in II Corps Tactical Zone, exposing the severe weaknesses of the South Vietnamese military. For South Vietnam, the defeat at Ban Me Thuot and the disastrous evacuation from the Central Highlands came about as a result of two major mistakes. Firstly, in the days leading up to the assault on Ban Me Thuot, II Corps commander Major General Phạm Văn Phú repeatedly ignored intelligence which showed the presence of several PAVN divisions around the district. Secondly, President Nguyễn Văn Thiệu's strategy to withdraw from the Central Highlands was poorly planned and implemented.

In the end, it was the ordinary South Vietnamese soldiers and their families who paid the ultimate price, as North Vietnamese artillery destroyed much of the South Vietnamese military convoy on Route 7.

== Background ==
At the beginning of 1975, members of the North Vietnamese Political Bureau paid close attention to the military situation in South Vietnam to plan for their next major offensive. On January 8, two days after the PAVN 4th Corps had captured Phuoc Long on the northern edges of South Vietnam's III Corps Tactical Zone, North Vietnamese leaders agreed to launch an all-out military offensive, in order to win the war. Originally, the North Vietnamese leaders expected the campaign would last two years, be completed in 1976, and pave the way for final victory. Their key objectives were to bring military pressure closer to Saigon, annihilate as many South Vietnamese military units as possible, and create favourable conditions on the battlefield so that combat forces could be deployed from their current localities.

Following extensive discussions on the fighting ability of the ARVN, the Political Bureau approved the General Staff's plan, which had selected the Central Highlands as the main battlefield for the upcoming offensive. The Central Highlands campaign was codenamed 'Campaign 275' and the goal was to capture the city of Ban Me Thuot. To achieve that objective, PAVN General Văn Tiến Dũng placed great emphasis on the principles of massed force, secrecy, and surprise to draw South Vietnamese forces away from the main objective. For the element of surprise to be successful, PAVN forces needed to launch strong diversionary attacks on Pleiku and Kon Tum, thereby leaving Ban Me Thuot completely exposed. Once the element of surprise had been achieved, the PAVN would mass their forces on Ban Me Thuot, and prevent South Vietnamese reinforcements from retaking the city.

=== Order of battle ===
==== North Vietnam ====
In March 1975 the PAVN Central Highlands Front, under the command of Lieutenant General Hoàng Minh Thảo, were given the responsibility of carrying out Campaign 275 to capture key objectives in the Central Highlands. Major General Vũ Lăng was the deputy commander, Colonel Đặng Vũ Hiệp was appointed the Front's political commissar, and Colonel Phí Triệu Hàm was the deputy political commissar.

The Central Highlands Front fielded five infantry divisions (3rd 'Yellow Star', 10th, 316th, 320A and 968th Infantry Divisions) and four independent regiments (25th, 271st, 95A, and 95B Infantry Regiments). To support the aforementioned units, North Vietnam deployed the 273rd Armoured Regiment, two artillery units (40th and 675th Artillery Regiments), three air-defence units (232nd, 234th, and 593rd Air-Defence Regiments), two combat engineer units (7th and 575th Combat Engineer Regiments), and the 29th Communications Regiment.

==== Offensive strategy ====
Between February 17 and February 19, 1975, PAVN field commanders in the Central Highlands Front held a conference to plan for their upcoming offensive. In order to plan their combat strategy, PAVN commanders assessed the potential obstacles faced by the PAVN and the strength of the ARVN in the Central Highlands. Following extensive discussions, PAVN commanders concluded that the ARVN in the Central Highlands could mobilise about 5–7 regiment-sized units to counter the upcoming offensive. In the worst-case scenario, if ARVN units were not tied up elsewhere, North Vietnamese commanders thought that the ARVN could probably mobilise between nine and twelve regiments. North Vietnamese commanders believed the ARVN could deploy about one or two armoured brigades, three to five battalions of artillery, and 80 aircraft per day to support the army. The North Vietnamese commanders within the Central Highlands Front discussed the possibility of the United States re-entering the conflict, which they believed would see the commitment of about 100 fighter-bombers from the United States Seventh Fleet.

Aside from dealing with the ARVN formations which South Vietnam might have deployed, the question of where and when to strike was the main problem that concerned the North Vietnamese. After the strength of both armies had been taken into account, the Central Highlands High Command came up with two offensive options.

In the first option, the PAVN could avoid the outlying ARVN installations and strike directly at their primary target of Ban Me Thuot. For the first option to be successful, the PAVN had to secure Highways 14, 19, and 21 to isolate Ban Me Thuot, and stop potential ARVN reinforcements. The North Vietnamese favoured the first option, because it would give the ARVN 23rd Infantry Division and other support units little or no time to respond. At the same time, the first option would have enabled a quick victory without inflicting large-scale damage on the civilian population of Ban Me Thuot.

In the second option, the North Vietnamese had to destroy all the outlying ARVN defences and then move on to Ban Me Thuot. The Central Highlands Front, under LTG Hoàng Minh Thảo's command, ordered all combat units to follow the second option and destroy the defences around Ban Me Thuot, but to be ready to switch to the first option when the opportunity presented itself.

==== South Vietnam ====
The 23rd Division under the command of Brigadier General Trần Văn Cẩm was the main unit defending Ban Me Thuot and the surrounding areas. Major General Phạm Văn Phú had at his disposal five artillery battalions equipped with 146 artillery guns, and one armoured brigade of about 117 tanks and armoured vehicles. The South Vietnamese military also stationed air force and naval units in Ban Me Thuot.

The ARVN also had in the Central Highlands the 22nd Division, 7 Ranger battalions, 36 Regional Force battalions, 8 artillery battalions equipped with 230 artillery guns, and 4 armoured brigades. To support those ground units, the Republic of Vietnam Air Force (VNAF) had 32 fighter-bombers, 86 helicopters, and 32 transport and reconnaissance aircraft.

Across the Central Highlands, the South Vietnamese military enjoyed a numerical superiority of about 78,300 soldiers against North Vietnam's 65,141 soldiers. However, within the vicinity of Ban Me Thuot, the South Vietnamese were actually outnumbered by a ratio of 5:1. The North Vietnamese had more tanks, armoured vehicles, and heavy artillery, with a ratio of about 2:1. Văn Tiến Dũng believed his tank and artillery units in the Central Highlands were the key factors that guaranteed a quick victory, because South Vietnam simply lacked the capability to withstand such large numbers of heavy weaponry.

==== South Vietnamese preparations ====
On February 18, 1975, Thiệu gathered all his commanders at the Independence Palace to discuss the Ly Thuong Kiet Military Plan, which was approved by the National Security Council in December 1974. During a briefing by ARVN Colonel Hoang Ngoc Lung, Head of the ARVN General Staff, several important issues were brought to the attention of Thiệu and the ARVN Corps commanders: firstly, information gathered by the ARVN showed there were seven PAVN divisions in the northern areas of South Vietnam's I Corps Tactical Zone; secondly, there were signs which suggested that the PAVN might launch a large-scale attack during the spring–summer season of 1975; and, thirdly, the II Corps Tactical Zone was most likely North Vietnam's first target. On February 19, Phú returned to Pleiku to draw up a defence plan.

During the next few days, reports from South Vietnamese intelligence showed that the PAVN 968th Infantry Division had arrived in South Vietnam's II Corps from Laos. Two divisions (10th and 320A Infantry Divisions) had taken up positions around Pleiku and Kon Tum, while the PAVN 271st and 202nd Regiments had set up their base in Quảng Đức.

On March 2, a CIA officer flew out from Nha Trang to inform ARVN Colonel Nguyễn Trọng Luật of PAVN preparations to attack Ban Me Thuot, without offering information on the strength of the PAVN formations. In response to the CIA report, Phú ordered the 53rd Regiment to move from Quảng Đức to Ban Me Thuot and the 45th Regiment from Thuan Man to Thanh An-Don Tham. Phú did not make any further changes to the South Vietnamese order of battle in or around Ban Me Thuot. Thus, by the time the North Vietnamese opened fire on Ban Me Thuot, Phú had simply failed to implement an effective plan to save II Corps.

== Prelude ==
=== Diversions ===
In February 1975, during the midst of Tet New Year celebrations, a PAVN deserter surrendered to the ARVN 2nd Brigade Headquarters. Through extensive interrogations, the soldier revealed the whereabouts of the PAVN units; the 10th Infantry Division had encircled Duc Lap, while the 320A Infantry Division had arrived in Ea H'leo and were gearing up for an assault on Thuan Man, and an unknown unit was heading towards Ban Me Thuot. In late February, PAVN artillery began to shell Pleiku, which convinced Phú that the North Vietnamese would attack Pleiku instead of Ban Me Thuot. South Vietnamese military intelligence and information received from the American Embassy in Saigon showed the presence of about two or three PAVN divisions positioned about 20 kilometres away from Kontum and Pleiku. Indeed, the movements around Pleiku and Kontum during the month of February were designed by the North Vietnamese Tay Nguyen Front to fool ARVN commanders in the Central Highlands.

Since December 1974, the North Vietnamese had prepared for the offensive by conducting raids on various ARVN outposts and broadcasting fake radio messages to keep ARVN commanders guessing about the location of their next assault. While the ARVN units were kept occupied by PAVN diversions, Hoàng Minh Thảo began moving his troops into attacking positions. The PAVN 7th Combat Engineer Regiment was tasked with connecting Route 14 at North Vo Dinh with Highway 19 near Mang Yang Pass, which surpassed the district of Kontum. The PAVN 10th Infantry Division began withdrawing from Duc Lap and only left a small force behind to continue the bombardment of Pleiku, as artillery and tank units took positions north of Kontum. The 320A Infantry Division deployed a small unit west of Pleiku to apply additional pressure on ARVN positions at La Son, Thanh An and Don Tam. Elements of the 95th Regiment conducted blocking operations along Highway 19 to stop South Vietnamese reinforcements from reaching their destination. The 198th Special Forces Regiment raided ARVN depots at Pleiku, while the main formation of the 10th and 320A Infantry Divisions marched on Ban Me Thuot.

Personnel from local Viet Cong units infiltrated Kontum and Pleiku to spread rumours of a "big Communist offensive" on the aforementioned districts. In response to the rumours, the ARVN 45th Infantry Regiment was sent out to sweep the areas near Ban Me Thuot, Thuan Man, and Duc Lap. To maintain the secrecy of their operations, the PAVN ordered the 320A Infantry Division, which had by then set up camp west of Ban Me Thuot, to avoid contact with the ARVN. Upon their arrival from Laos, the 316th Infantry Division received similar orders, and was not allowed to open fire under any circumstances. As the events in II CTZ were beginning to unfold, intelligence reports from Saigon continued to warn Phú of an imminent PAVN onslaught on Ban Me Thuot. Despite the numerous warnings which he had received from the CIA and his own military intelligence, Phú remained convinced that Pleiku would be North Vietnam's next target.

=== Closing in ===
On March 3, 1975, Campaign 275 began. The 95A Regiment was the first unit to go into action when they destroyed one South Vietnamese Regional Force battalion and successfully secured a 20-kilometre stretch of Highway 19 connecting Ayun with Pleibon and Phu Yen. Later, elements of the PAVN 3rd Division secured a section of Highway 19 at Thuong An that connected with Bridge no.13 at Dong An Khe, killing a claimed 300 ARVN soldiers. On the night of March 5, the PAVN 25th Regiment ambushed an ARVN convoy at Chi Cuc and cut off Highway 21 west of Ban Me Thuot. To keep all the main roads open, Phú sent reinforcements to defend a section of Highway 19 at the eastern side of Pleiku and ordered the ARVN 45th Infantry Regiment to march back from Thuan Man to defend Route 14 at southern Pleiku. The ARVN 53rd Infantry Regiment, under the command of Colonel Vũ Thế Quang, was redeployed from Quảng Đức Province to defend Ban Me Thuot. By March 8, the PAVN had completely isolated II CTZ from the rest of the country. Route 7, which had not been used for a long time due to neglect, was the only road still open.

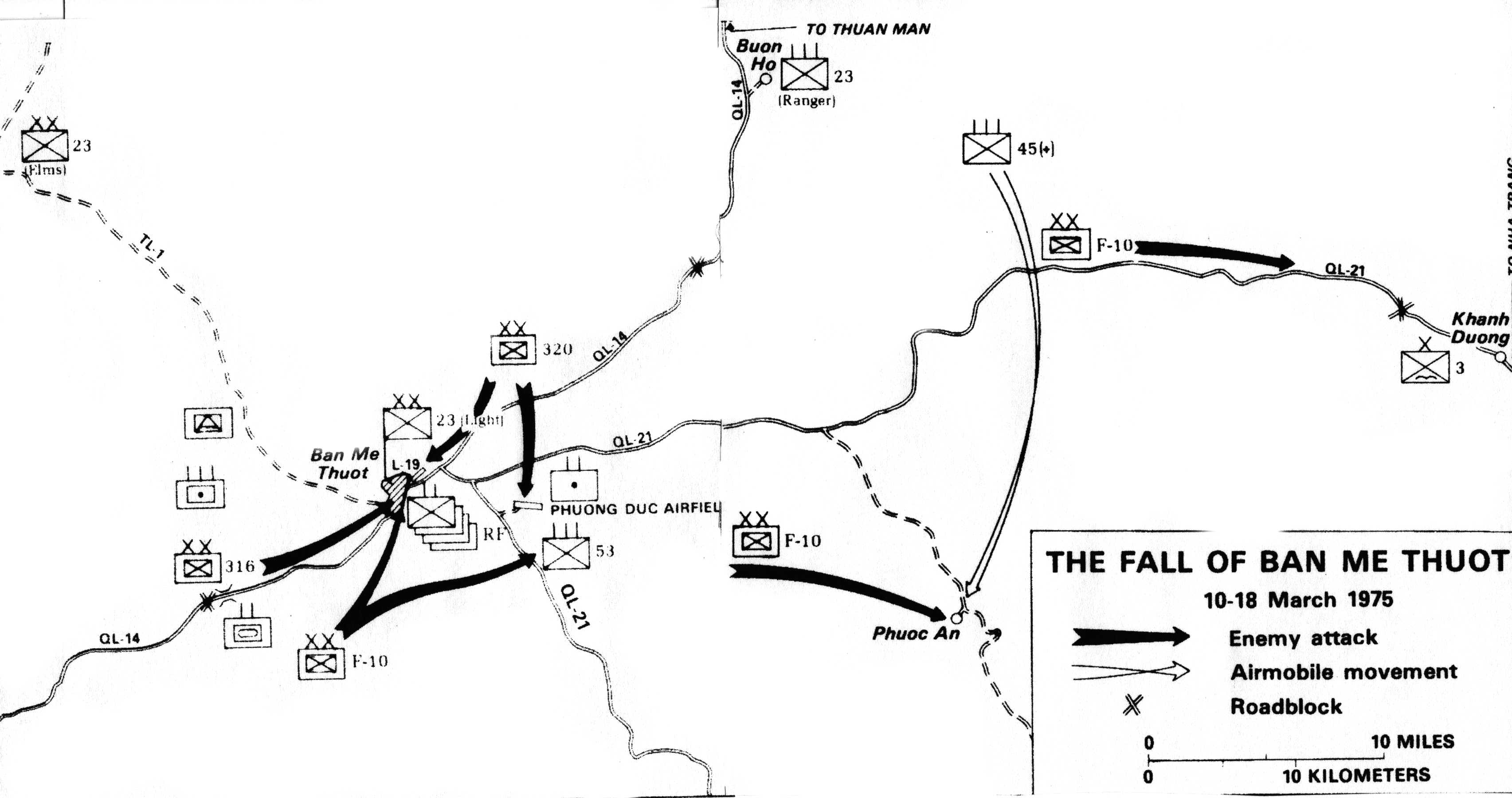
Battle of Ban Me Thuot

On March 5, Quang sent one of his battalions to Ban Me Thuot in a convoy of 14 vehicles. They were ambushed by the PAVN 9th Regiment, 320A Infantry Division at Thuan Man. Eight vehicles were destroyed, while two 150mm artillery guns were captured by the PAVN. The remaining seven vehicles had to turn back and Quang returned to Ban Me Thuot on a helicopter. On March 7, the PAVN 48th Regiment, 320A Infantry Division, captured Chu Se and Thuan Man, and took 121 soldiers prisoner. On March 9, Phú ordered the 21st Ranger Battalion to fly out from Pleiku to support the 53rd Infantry Regiment in their efforts to retake Thuan Man. During the early hours of March 9, as the 21st Ranger Battalion and the 53rd Infantry Regiment were repeatedly beaten back in their attempts to retake Thuan Man, the PAVN 10th Regiment captured Duc Lap and the surrounding areas.

At 11:00 on March 9, Phú flew out to Ban Me Thuot to assess the military situation with Brigadier General Lê Trung Tường—commander of the ARVN 23rd division, Colonel Vũ Thế Quang—his deputy and Colonel Nguyễn Trọng Luật—Darlac Province Chief. Phú admitted that the situation at Duc Lap was irreversible. The 21st Ranger Battalion was reassigned to the north of Ban Me Thuot, the 2nd Battalion of the 53rd Infantry Regiment was to defend Dac Sac and, when the opportunity arose, they would be tasked with retaking Duc Lap. Subsequently, Quang was entrusted with the task of defending Ban Me Thuot. Despite the presence of two PAVN divisions outside Ban Me Thuot, Phú believed the situation outside the district was only a mere diversion attempt and the real target would be Pleiku. Thus, upon arrival at his Pleiku headquarters, he raised the alert level there to 100%. While Phú was waiting for the enemy to assault Pleiku, the PAVN 7th and 575th Combat Engineer Regiments cleared the main roads into Ban Me Thuot to ensure tanks and heavy artillery could be directed at the district without hindrance. By the early hours of March 10, the PAVN was in position to strike at Ban Me Thuot.

== Battle ==
=== Fall of Ban Me Thuot ===
At 02:00 on March 10, 1975, the PAVN began their assault on South Vietnamese forces at Ban Me Thuot. The PAVN 149th and 198th Regiments spearheaded the attack by hitting the Phụng Dực Airfield, Mai Hắc Đế warehouse and the headquarters of the ARVN 53rd Infantry Regiment. The initial PAVN attack, which was marked by heavy artillery bombardment and actions initiated by the 198th Special Forces Regiment, had shocked ARVN Colonels Nguyễn Trọng Luật and Vũ Thế Quang. Despite the strength of the initial assault, Quang believed the PAVN only wanted to cause disruption and would withdraw their forces by daybreak. By 03:30 the 4th Battalion, 198th Special Forces Regiment, had successfully secured Phan Chu Trinh Road and the southern part of Phụng Dực Airfield and they waited there for the regular infantry and tank units to arrive. While the PAVN sappers quickly penetrated the 44th Regiment base area, which was defended by only rear echelon troops, they met stiff resistance in attacking the 53rd Regiment's base and by dawn had been pushed out of the base with the loss of over 100 dead.

The PAVN 5th Battalion, 198th Special Forces Regiment continued their assault on South Vietnamese installations at Mai Hắc Đế warehouse and the headquarters of the ARVN 53rd Infantry Regiment. The 5th Battalion successfully overran the nearby ARVN artillery position and the tactical operations centre. By 05:00 all main roads leading into the city of Ban Me Thuot were completely under PAVN control. As the sun rose, the PAVN continued to pound South Vietnamese positions around Ban Me Thuot with heavy artillery to cover the next wave of infantry assaults. During the morning of March 10, PAVN infantry units attacked Ban Me Thuot from different directions along the main roads. The 174th Regiment, with one armoured battalion in support, marched through Chi Lang, Chu Di, and Mai Hắc Đế from the northwest. As the 95B Regiment approached Ban Me Thuot from the northeast, the main formation of the 149th Regiment secured Chu Blom and marched towards Ban Me Thuot from the southeast. The 1st Battalion, 3rd Regiment and the 1st Battalion, 149th Regiment launched an assault on Phụng Dực Airfield from the northeast and southwest respectively. At the same time, the 2nd Regiment captured the South Vietnamese installation at Phuoc An.

In an attempt to halt the PAVN assault, Luật ordered two squadrons of M113 armored personnel carriers to confront the enemy at Ngã Sáu, but they were forced to turn back by tanks from the PAVN 3rd Tank Battalion, 273rd Armoured Regiment. At around 17:30, an ARVN Ranger battalion was forced to abandon the nearby installation at Darlac after continuous assaults from the 95B Regiment. In the northeast, the ARVN 9th Ranger Battalion held off the PAVN 95B Regiment until they abandoned their positions the next day. In the western outskirts of Ban Me Thuot, eight A-37 Dragonfly bombers from the VNAF 6th Air Force Division inflicted light casualties on the PAVN 24th Regiment, but failed to stop their momentum. In the southwest, Quang tried to retake Mai Hắc Đế warehouse by mobilising his reserve units with tactical air support.

Earlier in the day, at about 02:30, ARVN Colonel Trinh Tieu, Chief of the ARVN 2nd Brigade in II Corps, discovered that the PAVN 316th Infantry Division had moved into positions south of Ban Me Thuot from their base in Laos. To stop them from advancing any further, Phú ordered his soldiers to destroy every bridge connected to Highway 14. By the time Phú's order was carried out, elements of the 316th Infantry Division had already been engaged in clashes with the ARVN for more than 10 hours.

During the night of March 10, there was a lull in the fighting around Ban Me Thuot. ARVN soldiers consolidated to various points around the headquarters of the 23rd Infantry Division, the Phụng Dực Airfield, and the radio station. Colonel Quang, in a desperate attempt to save Ban Me Thuot, called on Brigadier General Lê Trung Tường to send reinforcements; none were sent. In the early hours of March 11, the PAVN resumed their assault under continuous bombing runs from VNAF A-37s. At 07:55, the VNAF, while trying to stop a dozen PAVN tanks from advancing toward their objective, accidentally dropped two bombs on the headquarters of the 23rd Infantry Division. From that point on, the 23rd Infantry Division lost all contact with the ARVN 2nd Brigade Command Headquarters. At 11:00 on March 11, the PAVN 316th Infantry Division established full control over Ban Me Thuot with only Phụng Dực Airfield still in ARVN hands, defended by the under-strength ARVN 21st Ranger Battalion and the 53rd Infantry Regiment. The PAVN 149th Regiment launched another attack against the 53rd Regiment's positions on 11 March, but were forced back with numerous casualties.

=== Counterattack ===
On March 12, all ARVN soldiers who had survived the PAVN assault gathered at the headquarters of the 23rd Infantry Division and Phụng Dực Airfield. Unfortunately, those soldiers were without their leaders, because both Colonels Nguyễn Trọng Luật and Vũ Thế Quang were captured by the PAVN in the early hours of the day. From Saigon, Thiệu ordered Phú to hold all South Vietnamese positions at the eastern end of Ban Me Thuot, where they could stage a counter-attack. Phú drew up a plan to retake Ban Me Thuot that would involve the last two remaining regiments (44th and 45th Infantry Regiments) of the 23rd Infantry Division and the soldiers who had gathered at the 23rd Infantry Division headquarters and Phụng Dực airfield. Thiệu approved the plan at dawn, and authorised Phú to make full use of three VNAF units (6th Air Force Division belonging to the ARVN 2nd Brigade, 1st Air Force Division at Da Nang Air Base and the 4th Air Force Division at Cần Thơ).

From 12–13 March, the ARVN 45th Regiment was dropped by helicopter onto Hill 581, one mile (1.6 km) east of Phụng Dực, to begin a counterattack to retake Ban Mê Thuột, which had fallen on 12 March. Initially, about 100 South Vietnamese helicopters participated in the operation, and 81 fighter-bombers were deployed to strike at PAVN positions to cover the landings. At 15:10, Phú took off in his Cessna U-17 to direct the operation over the skies of Ban Me Thuot. As he approached the battlefield, Phú radioed the ARVN units at Phụng Dực Airfield to notify them that an operation was underway, and he encouraged the soldiers to hold on to their positions. On the morning of March 13, another 145 helicopters were used to complete the first phase of the operation with the entire 44th Infantry Regiment, the last soldiers of the 45th Infantry Regiment and the 232nd Artillery Battalion dropped off at various points in Nong Trai, Phuoc An, and along Highway 21. At the completion of the landing operation, Phú returned to Pleiku to have a meeting with Thiệu, during which they discussed the sudden appearance of the PAVN 316th Infantry Division.

North Vietnamese soldiers pose on top of a captured South Vietnamese UH-1 helicopter at Phụng Dực Airfield

While the VNAF was transporting the 23rd Infantry Division to the battlefield, their airbase at Cu Hanh was subjected to artillery bombardment from the PAVN 968th Infantry Division. The PAVN command had anticipated the South Vietnamese military's movements, so they built up their forces in and around Ban Me Thuot to prepare for a South Vietnamese counter-attack. On March 13, the PAVN 24th and 28th Regiments received two companies of armoured vehicles and one artillery battalion, which had begun raining artillery shells on Phuoc An. At dawn on 14 March, the 149th Regiment launched another attack on Phụng Dực supported by six tanks; the attack was again beaten back with the loss of one tank. A further attack was scheduled to take place during the afternoon, but some of the supporting infantry failed to arrive on time. The attack took place at sunset, and the tanks became disoriented in the fading light and vulnerable to ARVN fire. By midnight, the attack was called off. Simultaneously with the attack on Phụng Dực, the PAVN 24th Regiment, supported by tanks, attacked the ARVN 45th Regiment on Hill 581, scattering the 45th Regiment, killing over 200 soldiers, and ending the hopes for a counterattack to retake Ban Mê Thuột.

At 03:00 on 16 March, the PAVN launched an artillery barrage on the 53rd Regiment base, followed by a two-pronged assault 90 minutes later by the 66th and 149th Regiments supported by tanks. The PAVN were unable to breach the base's earthen walls and lost two more tanks to rockets and anti-tank defenses. PAVN engineers eventually blasted a path through the defenses, and by dawn on 17 March, the PAVN had finally penetrated into the base. The 53rd Regiment commander Colonel Vo An and over 100 of his men managed to escape the base and make for ARVN positions at Phuoc An.

=== Retreat ===
While battles were raging in and around Ban Me Thuot, South Vietnamese military forces in I Corps were under pressure by the PAVN 324th and 325th Infantry Divisions. During the period from March 8 to March 13, there were clashes in Truoi in southern Huế, Mai Linh, Mo Tau, Thien Phuoc and Quảng Ngãi. As a result of the immense pressure placed upon I Corps, the ARVN General Staff could not deploy strong units from the region to defend Ban Me Thuot and the rest of II Corps.

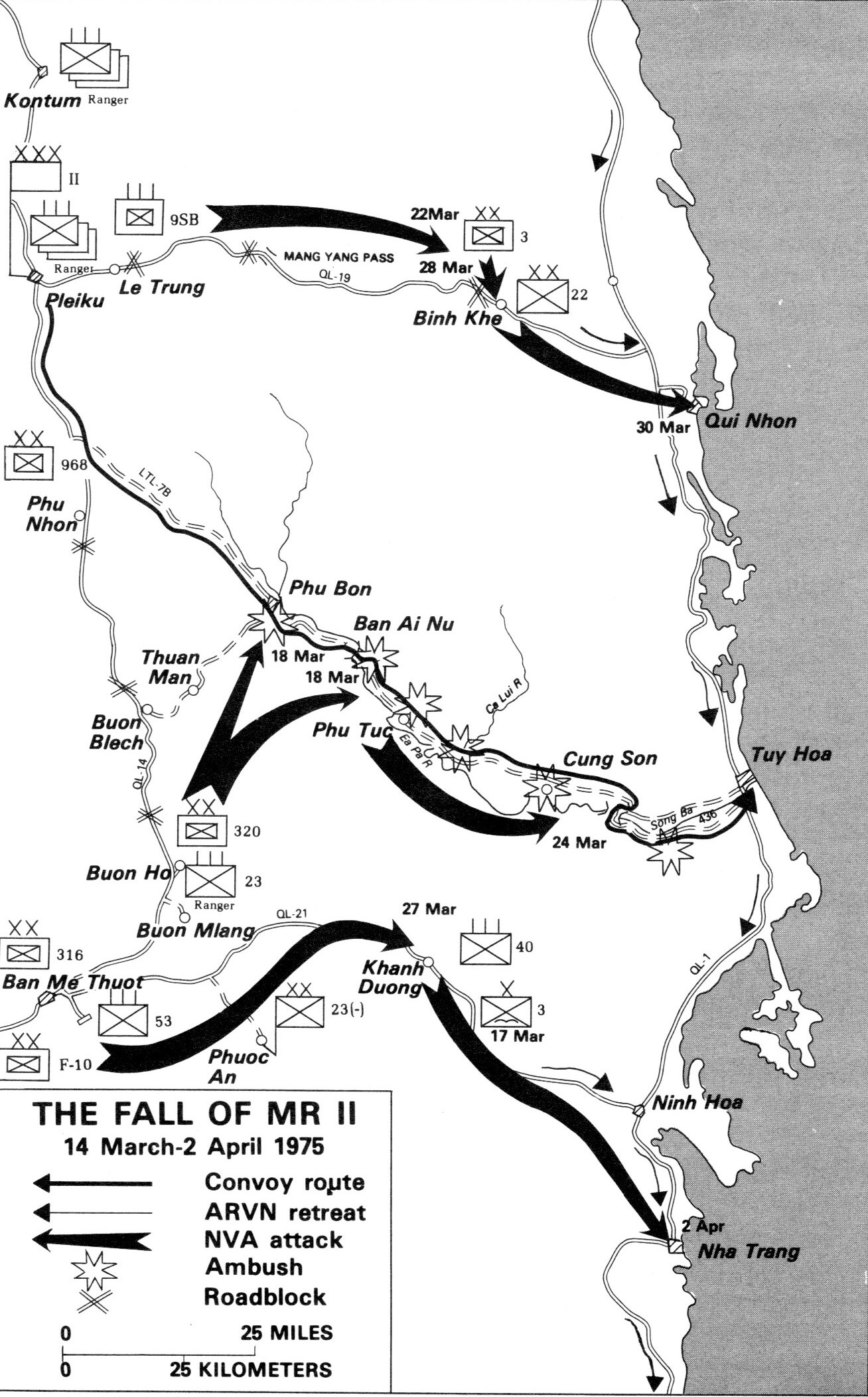
The fall of Military Region II

On March 11, Thiệu convened a meeting with Prime Minister Trần Thiện Khiêm, Chief of the General Staff Cao Văn Viên, and Assistant for Security affairs Đặng Văn Quang to discuss the military situation in the northern provinces of South Vietnam. In this meeting, Thiệu decided to withdraw what was left of his army from the northern provinces to defend the Mekong Delta region, where most of the nation's population and vital economic resources were located. Thiệu justified his decision on the basis that the South Vietnamese military could not defend every inch of South Vietnam's territory, so the military had to be 'lightened at the top and heavy at the bottom'.

Starting at 11:00 on March 14, Thiệu flew out to Cam Ranh for a briefing with Phú. The events which took place after this briefing would go down as one of the greatest failures in military history. After Phú had outlined the military situation in the Central Highlands, he asked Thiệu to bolster the VNAF 6th Air Force Division with more aircraft and additional brigades to defend Kontum and Pleiku. Thiệu refused to send further reinforcements because the South Vietnamese military no longer had the resources. Phú was ordered to move all his units down to the Mekong region where they could continue fighting. General Viên cautioned against moving large military formations down Highway 19; he reminded Thiệu of the Battle of Mang Yang Pass where the French Group Mobile 100 was destroyed in 1954. Thiệu and his commanders made the decision to use Route 7 instead, in an attempt to surprise the PAVN, who would not expect them to use that road due to its poor condition.

When the meeting drew to its end, Phú suddenly requested Thiệu to promote his subordinate, Colonel Phạm Văn Tất, commander of the Ranger Forces in II Corps, to Brigadier General. Both Viên and Thiệu hesitated, but Phú's repeated pleading got Thiệu's consent at last. After being promoted, Tất was assigned to command the forces to be redeployed while Phú's two deputies, Brigadier Generals Trần Văn Cẩm and Lê Văn Thân were not given any clear responsibilities in the redeployment.

After the briefing, Phú immediately returned to his headquarters in Pleiku, where he began planning for the withdrawal with Cẩm, Tất, Brigadier General Phạm Ngọc Sang and Colonel Le Khac Ly. To maintain secrecy, Phú ordered his officers to issue orders using only word of mouth instead of written documents and not to reveal the withdrawal plan to local Regional Forces. Furthermore, he stated that the abandonment of II CTZ had to be quick, with the ARVN taking only enough military equipment and ammunition to fight one last battle. Generals Tất and Cẩm were assigned the task of supervising the movements of soldiers and their dependents on the ground. Sang was responsible for the movement of vital military equipment and supplies via air transport and to sweep Route 7 using VNAF fighter-bombers. Ly was ordered to lead a group of combat engineers to repair the road and bridges on Route 7, as well as maintain contact with the ARVN 2nd Brigade Headquarters in Nha Trang. The plan was destined to fail, as Phú was unaware that Lieutenant General Ngô Quang Trưởng, commander of I Corps Tactical Zone, had also received similar orders to evacuate.

=== Disaster on Route 7 ===
Although local commanders in II Corps Tactical Zone tried their best to maintain secrecy, the unusual movement of transport aircraft in Pleiku on March 14 stirred up concern and suspicion amongst soldiers and civilians in the area. On March 15 the concerns of civilians were further heightened when a convoy of transport vehicles belonging to the 6th and 23rd Ranger Battalions headed south from Kontum. On the afternoon of March 15, the withdrawal of ARVN forces began to pick up momentum. The ARVN 19th Armoured Cavalry Squadron and the 6th Ranger Battalion opened the main road which stretched from Pleiku to Phu Tuc. Behind them were various infantry, armoured vehicles, and support units. During the early phases of the operation, Phú was confident that his plan would succeed for two reasons. Firstly, he believed most PAVN units were busy stopping the counter-attack at Phuoc An waged by the ARVN 23rd Infantry Division and would not have the time to disrupt the withdrawal. Secondly, if the PAVN 968th Infantry Division near Pleiku was deployed to stop the operation, it would have to overcome the formidable ARVN 25th Ranger Battalion which was tasked with stopping any PAVN attacks.

Chaos descended on Route 7 as South Vietnamese soldiers and civilians attempted to evacuate from the Central Highlands

For PAVN field commanders, the withdrawal of South Vietnamese military forces from II Corps Tactical Zone came as a surprise, but it was not totally unexpected. What surprised the North Vietnamese the most was the speed of the withdrawal. Indeed, it was not until the evening of March 15, when the ARVN 19th Armoured Cavalry Squadron reached Cheo Reo, that the North Vietnamese began to receive information of Saigon's decision to abandon the Central Highlands. At 20:00 on March 16, the Tay Nguyen Front Command issued the first orders to pursue the South Vietnamese. The PAVN 9th Battalion, 64th Regiment, part of the 320A Infantry Division, was the first unit to be mobilised to intercept the South Vietnamese column south of Cheo Reo district. Subsequently, the entire PAVN 320A Infantry Division was sent to destroy the South Vietnamese column along Route 7, with the 2nd Tank Battalion of the 273rd Armoured Regiment, the 675th Regiment and the 593rd Anti-Aircraft Regiment in support. By the early hours of March 17, tanks from the ARVN 19th Armoured Cavalry Squadron and the 6th Ranger Battalion clashed with the PAVN 9th Battalion, 64th Regiment at Tona Pass, about four kilometres away from the district of Cheo Reo.

During the evening of March 17, Tất organised a counter-attack against the PAVN 9th Battalion with support from fighter-bombers, tanks, and artillery, but his troops were repeatedly beaten back in their attempt to keep the road open. By the early hours of March 18, the entire PAVN 64th Regiment had blocked all the routes around Tona Pass, while the 48th Regiment and elements of the PAVN 968th Infantry Division began closing in on Cheo Reo from three directions. In the afternoon, Phú sent the 25th Ranger Battalion and the 2nd Armoured Cavalry Brigade to reopen Route 7. At the same time, the PAVN 675th Artillery Regiment began shelling the main South Vietnamese column in Cheo Reo as three infantry regiments attacked the convoy from all sides. Unfortunately for the South Vietnamese, all their attempts to organise strong resistance were stifled by the chaos created by PAVN artillery bombardments. At 15:00, Tất was ordered to destroy all heavy weaponry so the North Vietnamese could not make use of it. About 30 minutes later, a UH-1 helicopter landed on the grounds of Phu Bon primary school to pick up Tất and flew off to Nha Trang. At 09:00 on March 19, all ARVN soldiers in the district of Cheo Reo stopped fighting. The 6th Ranger Battalion and the 19th Armoured Cavalry Squadron became the only units to arrive at their destination at Cung Son with only light casualties.

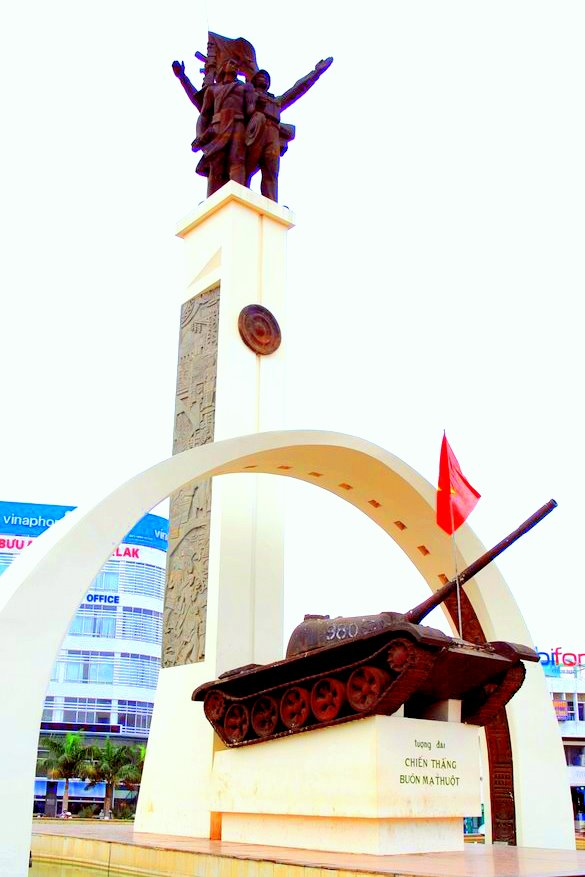
A monument to commemorate the Ban Me Thuot victory erected by the Socialist Republic of Vietnam, located in Đắk Lắk province

== Aftermath ==
The loss of Ban Me Thuot and the subsequent evacuation from the Central Highlands cost South Vietnam's II Corps Tactical Zone more than 75% of its combat units—the 23rd Infantry Division, the Ranger groups, tanks, armoured cavalry, artillery, and combat engineering units. Overall, about 3/4 of all ARVN soldiers were killed, wounded, deserted, or missing. PAVN casualties were light in comparison, with 600 soldiers killed and 2,416 wounded. Official Vietnamese history claims that during the eight days of fighting, the PAVN put 28,514 South Vietnamese officers and soldiers out of action; 4,502 were killed in action and 16,822 were captured. The PAVN destroyed 17,183 small arms of various kinds, 79 artillery pieces and 207 tanks and armoured vehicles; 44 aircraft were shot down, and another 110 were damaged.

Civilians who took part in the evacuation suffered the consequences of the military action along Route 7. Most of the civilians who followed the military convoy were either relatives of soldiers or officers in the ARVN, or were government civil servants. Of the estimated 400,000 civilians who initially took part in the march, only a handful actually reached their destination on the coast. In addition to the casualties inflicted upon them by PAVN artillery, the civilians were also hit by air strikes from the VNAF. As a result of those huge losses, Route 7 became known as the 'convoy of tears'. An estimated 155,000 refugees were killed or abducted on Route 7.

=== South Vietnamese mistakes ===
The collapse of South Vietnamese forces in the Central Highlands came as a result of three major factors. Firstly, during much of the war, Thiệu's confidence in the ARVN's intelligence could not be shaken. However, following the capitulation of Ban Me Thuot, Thiệu lost all faith in his own military intelligence agencies, when it became clear that the strength of the PAVN was far greater than what South Vietnamese intelligence agencies had gathered. Consequently, Thiệu completely ignored his own military intelligence and the CIA and made all military decisions by himself without consulting the Joint General Staff. Thus, when Phú requested that Thiệu send reinforcements to bolster the strength of South Vietnamese forces in the Central Highlands, Thiệu gave him two options: either carry out the President's orders, or be replaced by somebody who was willing to do so. Phú chose to implement Thiệu's orders and evacuated his units from II Corps.

The second factor was the inability of ARVN commanders to coordinate the withdrawal. In the process of pulling out from the Central Highlands, large numbers of ARVN soldiers and heavy military equipment were stretched out along the narrow corridor of Route 7. Behind the military formation were huge numbers of South Vietnamese civilians who were relatives of the military personnel, as well as government officials and their families. Unfortunately for the ARVN soldiers on the ground, their army simply lacked the logistical system required to maintain the element of secrecy, which South Vietnamese commanders had hoped would enable them to pull out from the region without drawing too much attention from the North Vietnamese. When North Vietnamese forces attacked the South Vietnamese column along Route 7, there was little the South Vietnamese commanders could do to prevent the destruction of their units.

The third factor which led to the quick disintegration of II Corps was the poor state of morale amongst the soldiers of the ARVN. By 1975, the morale of South Vietnamese soldiers and their commanding officers had reached its lowest point as the war continued to drag on with no end in sight. The determination of the ARVN officer corps had taken a serious blow when South Vietnamese Foreign Minister Trần Văn Lắm returned from the United States in February 1975, and reported that no additional military or economic aid had been offered. When the order was given to abandon the Central Highlands, the primary concern of South Vietnamese military personnel was not battlefield victories, but rather the welfare of their families, a phenomenon termed family syndrome by United States military forces. Consequently, when the North Vietnamese attacked South Vietnamese forces on Route 7, large numbers of South Vietnamese soldiers left the battlefield to search for their families amidst the chaos. During the final days of South Vietnam's existence, the average South Vietnamese soldier showed more loyalty to his family than to his commanding officer, which had a significant impact on his willingness to fight on.

During the First Indochina War (1945 to 1954), both Viet Minh and French forces considered the Central Highlands to be their 'home', as it was considered the key to domination in Indochina. Both sides recognised that in order to occupy the Central Highlands, they had to possess a sufficient reserve of manpower with which to control the strategic areas within the region. By 1975, the South Vietnamese military could no longer afford to maintain a large strategic reserve. South Vietnamese units in II Corps were overstretched in various locations across the Central Highlands, and could easily be overrun by enemy forces. Although Thiệu's decision to abandon the region was made with the aim of saving the military formations of II Corps, the decision nonetheless turned into a death warrant for Phú's men and their families. The lack of coordination and poor organisation during the withdrawal operation not only led to the destruction of II Corps, but marked the beginning of the end for South Vietnam.
