= 1975 spring offensive =

North Vietnamese campaign ending the Vietnam War

- Part of the Vietnam War
- Advances of the North Vietnamese army during the offensive
Date	13 December 1974 – 30 April 1975 (4 months, 2 weeks and 3 days)
Location	South Vietnam; Cambodia; Laos
Result	North Vietnamese victory; Fall of Saigon to the PAVN and the Viet Cong; Dissolution of the Republic of Vietnam; End of the Vietnam War

Belligerents
North Vietnam; Viet Cong; Supported by: Soviet Union; China; North Korea; East Germany; Cuba	South Vietnam; Humanitarian support: United States

Commanders and leaders
(North Vietnam) Lê Duẩn; Văn Tiến Dũng; Lê Ngọc Hiền; Đinh Đức Thiện; Lê Trọng Tấn; Nguyễn Hữu An; Vũ Lăng; Hoàng Cầm; Trần Văn Trà; Lê Đức Anh	(South Vietnam) Nguyễn Văn Thiệu; Dương Văn Minh (surrendered); Cao Văn Viên; Ngô Quang Trưởng; Phạm Văn Phú †; Dư Quốc Đống; Nguyễn Văn Toàn; Nguyễn Khoa Nam †; Trần Quang Khôi; Lê Nguyên Vỹ †

Units involved
Bình Trị Thiên Front; Tây Nguyên Front; Southern Regional Headquarters; Southwestern Command	I Corps; II Corps; III Corps; IV Corps

Strength
U.S. figures: In South Vietnam: 270,000 (Note: Forces which actually participated in the offensive.); Total forces: 1,000,000; Vietnamese figures:: 270,000 men 1,076 artillery pieces, mortars and recoilless guns 320 tanks and 250 armoured vehicles 679 trucks Six A-37 Dragonfly aircraft	Sources 1: 1,110,000 men (710,000 regulars, 400,000 armed CIDG); 1,607 artillery pieces (105mm, 155mm and 175mm), 14,900 mortars, 200+ recoilless guns 2,044 tanks and armoured vehicles 1,556 aircraft and helicopters 579 war ships On 26 April: In the perimeter around Saigon: 250,000 men (152,000 regulars); 407 artillery pieces 624 tanks and armoured vehicles 229 aircraft At 4th Tactical Zone: 175,000 men (66,000 regulars); 386 artillery pieces 493 tanks and armoured vehicles 118 aircraft Sources 2: Regular Forces: 495,000; Regional Forces: 475,000; Popular Force: 381,000

Casualties and losses
Total:~23,999: ~8,000 killed; 15,999 wounded	Total: ~1.19 million: ~30,000 killed; 60,000 wounded; ~1.1 million surrendered, captured or disbanded; More than $5 billion (1975 cost) in U.S. supplied hardware were captured
- 155,000 refugees killed or abducted

The 1975 spring offensive (Vietnamese: chiến dịch mùa Xuân 1975), officially known as the general offensive and uprising of spring 1975 (Vietnamese: Tổng tiến công và nổi dậy mùa Xuân 1975), was the final North Vietnamese campaign of the Vietnam War that led to the capitulation of South Vietnam. In December 1974, People's Army of Vietnam's (PAVN) forces crossed from their bases in Cambodia and captured Phước Long Province by January 1975. After this success, the North Vietnamese leadership increased the scope of the PAVN offensive and attacked the Central Highlands from Cambodia in March, capturing the city of Buôn Ma Thuột on 18 March. These operations were intended to be preparatory to launching a general offensive in 1976.

Following these defeats, the South Vietnamese leadership realized they were no longer able to defend the entire country and ordered a strategic withdrawal from the Central Highlands. The retreat was a disaster as civilian refugees fled under fire alongside soldiers along a single highway to the coast. This situation was worsened by confusing orders, lack of command, and a well-led and aggressive enemy, which led to the destruction of most South Vietnamese forces in the Central Highlands. A similar collapse occurred in the northern provinces where PAVN forces captured both Huế and Đà Nẵng by the end of March.

Following the ARVN collapse, North Vietnam transferred its northern forces over 350 miles (560 km) south down the Ho Chi Minh trail through Laos and Cambodia to capture the South Vietnamese capital of Saigon and win the war in time to celebrate their late President Ho Chi Minh's birthday. South Vietnamese forces regrouped around the capital and defended the key transportation hubs at Phan Rang and Xuân Lộc, but the South Vietnamese had lost the political and military will to continue. On 21 April, South Vietnamese President Nguyễn Văn Thiệu resigned, hoping the North Vietnamese would reopen negotiations. However, the PAVN continued to attack. While IV Corps southwest of Saigon remained relatively stable, preventing VC units from capturing any provincial capitals, PAVN forces entered Saigon, forcing the South Vietnamese government, now under the leadership of Dương Văn Minh, to surrender on 30 April 1975.

== Preliminaries ==
=== Strategies ===
The signing of the Paris Peace Accords in January 1973 did not end the fighting in South Vietnam since both sides violated the cease-fire and attempted to gain control of as much territory as possible. Occupation meant population control in any future negotiations or reunification effort. The fighting that erupted was not small in scale. The three-phase North Vietnamese "Land-grabbing-and population nibbling" campaign, for example, included four division-sized attacks to seize strategically advantageous positions. The International Commission of Control and Supervision (ICCS), established by a protocol of the Paris agreement, had been assigned the task of monitoring the implementation of the cease-fire. (Note: The ICCS was made up of Canadian (later replaced by Iranians), Indonesian, Polish, and Hungarian members.) The principles of consultation and unanimity among the members, however, doomed any effort to control the situation or to stop cease-fire violations, and the ICCS ceased to function in any meaningful way within a few months of its establishment.

At the end of 1973, there was serious debate among the Hanoi leadership over future military policy as the Central Committee of the Communist Party of Vietnam convened to assess the progress of its efforts in the south. General Văn Tiến Dũng, PAVN chief of staff, and Defence Minister Võ Nguyên Giáp strongly urged the resumption of conventional military operations, warning that increasing passivity would affect the morale of the army. Premier Phạm Văn Đồng, however, feared resuming operations would drain vital resources needed for reconstruction in the north.

The final result of this debate was Resolution 21, which called for "strategic raids" on South Vietnamese forces in order to regain territory lost to the ARVN since the conclusion of the Peace Accords and to test the reaction of both the South Vietnamese military and the American government. The first blows of the new policy were delivered between March and November 1974, when the communists attacked ARVN forces in Quảng Đức Province and at Biên Hòa. Hanoi's leaders watched closely and anxiously as strikes by American B-52 Stratofortress bombers failed to materialize. During these operations, however, PAVN retook the military initiative, gaining experience in combined arms operations, depleting ARVN forces, causing them to expend large quantities of ammunition, and gaining avenues of approach and jump-off points for any new offensive.

South Vietnamese President Nguyễn Văn Thiệu had made his position on the cease-fire agreement quite public by proclaiming the "Four Nos": no negotiations with the communists; no communist political activities south of the Vietnamese Demilitarized Zone (DMZ); no coalition government; and no surrender of territory to the North Vietnamese or Provisional Revolutionary Government (PRG) – policies which all but abrogated the Paris Accords. Thiệu still believed the promise made by President Richard Nixon to reintroduce American air power to the conflict if any serious violations of the agreement took place. It was also assumed that U.S. financial and military aid would continue to be forthcoming at previous levels.

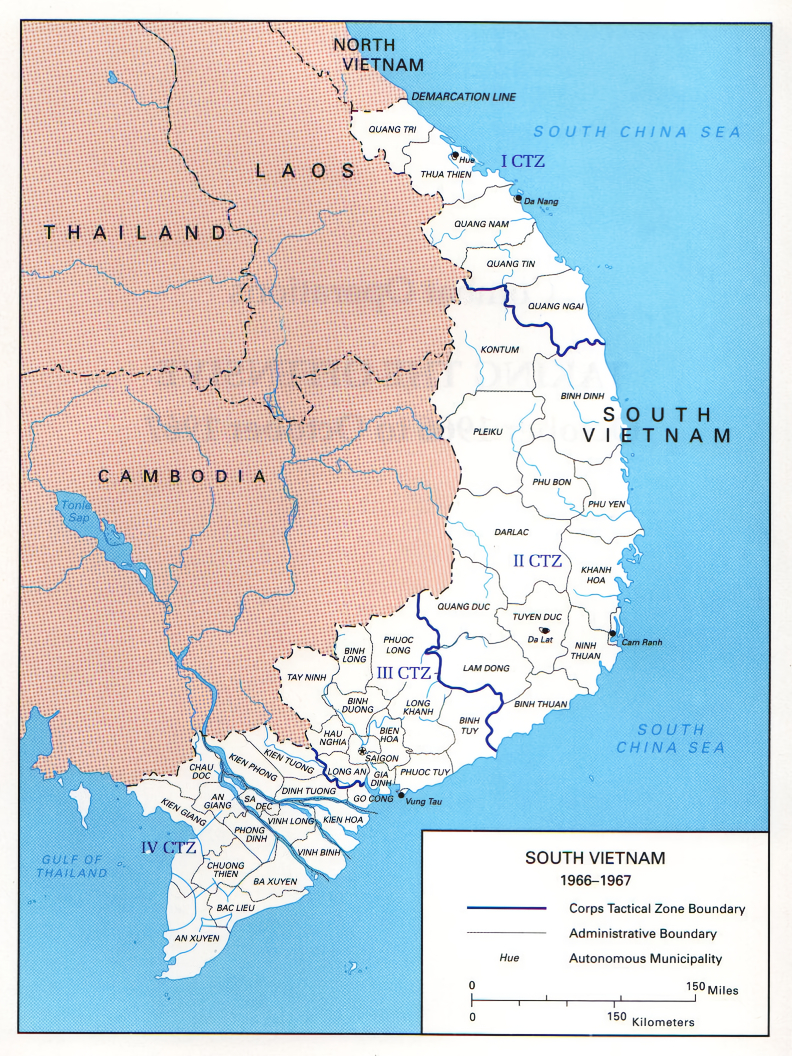
The Republic of Vietnam, Corps Tactical Zones

On 1 July 1973, however, the U.S. Congress passed the Case–Church Amendment, legislation that all but prohibited any direct or indirect U.S. combat activities over or in Laos, Cambodia, and both Vietnams. On 7 November the legislative branch overrode Nixon's veto of the War Powers Act. During 1972–1973, South Vietnam had received $2.2 billion in U.S. assistance. In 1973–1974, that figure was slashed to $965 million, a more than 50 percent reduction. Nixon's growing political difficulties (especially the Watergate scandal) and the increasing antagonism between the legislative and executive branches over Vietnam policies, did little to dampen South Vietnamese expectations. Some among the Saigon leadership were more realistic in their appraisal. According to Republic of Vietnam Armed Force (RVNAF) Lt. Gen. Đồng Văn Khuyên: "Our leaders continued to believe in U.S. air intervention even after the U.S. Congress had expressly forbidden it ... They deluded themselves." The shock of reduced aid was compounded on 9 August, when Richard Nixon, the guarantor of South Vietnamese independence, was forced to resign from office. In October 1973, the Arab oil embargo began, and the resulting oil shock of 1973–74 caused a massive bout of inflation that largely destroyed the South Vietnamese economy with a spokesman for Thiệu admitting in a TV interview that the government was being "overwhelmed" by the inflation. One consequence of the inflation was the South Vietnamese government had increasing difficulty in paying its soldiers.

Taking advantage of North Vietnam's period of recuperation in 1974, President Thiệu stretched his forces thin by launching offensives that retook most of the territory captured by PAVN forces during the land grab of 1973 and 15 percent of the total land area controlled by the PAVN at the time of the cease-fire. In April, Thiệu launched the Svay Rieng Campaign against PAVN strongholds in eastern Cambodia. This proved to be the last major offensive operation launched by the ARVN. While these operations succeeded, the cost in terms of manpower and resources was high. By the end of the year the military experienced shortages as a result of decreased American aid, while communist forces continued gaining strength.

By the end of October the North Vietnamese Politburo decided on its strategy for 1975 and 1976. In what became known as Resolution of 1975, the party leadership reported that the war reached its "final stage". The army was to consolidate its gains, eliminate South Vietnamese border outposts and secure its logistical corridor, and continue its force build-up in the south. During 1976 the final general offensive would begin. The strategy was undoubtedly conservative, but the North Vietnamese General Staff overestimated the capabilities of the ARVN, which fought well in the summer and into the fall. They continually believed that the South Vietnamese, technically at least, were still superior in overall strength. The following month, PAVN field commanders and their political officers were called to Hanoi to assess the new strategy. It was first decided that an attack in the Central Highlands would have the greatest chance of success, but this concept was challenged by Lieutenant General Trần Văn Trà, COSVN's military commander. His staff already drew a plan for a direct attack against Saigon, and Trà quickly proposed that his forces launch a probing attack in Phước Long Province to see how well the ARVN would fight and if the U.S. would react. Trà's plan offered the potential for great gain at low risk. First Party Secretary Lê Duẩn approved the plan, but warned Trà that failure would not be acceptable, telling him "Go ahead and attack...[But] you must be sure of victory."

=== Opposing forces ===
==== ARVN ====
After the signing of the Paris Accords, the South Vietnamese government fielded the fourth largest military force in the world as a result of the American Enhance and Enhance Plus programs. The nation received new combat and transport aircraft, armored vehicles, helicopters, artillery pieces, and other equipment worth $753 million. The arms shipments were welcomed by Saigon, but the lack of sufficient training and dependence on the U.S. for spare parts, fuel, and ammunition caused maintenance and logistical problems. South Vietnamese forces certainly outnumbered combined PAVN/Viet Cong (VC) forces in the south with approximately one and one-half million troops in uniform. But almost 482,000 of this number belonged to either the Regional or Popular Forces, organizations of mixed reliability. Even the lesser number was misleading. Only about 200,000 of the remaining total served as regulars in the combat arms. The rest were in the administrative and logistical "tail" required to support them (of course, a large proportion of the active PAVN and VC forces were likewise engaged, on the Ho Chi Minh Trail, anti-aircraft networks, administration, etc., as is true of any modern army).

The ARVN always had problems keeping men in the ranks, but during 1973–75, the problem reached epidemic proportions. During 1974, for example, only 65 percent of authorized manpower was present for duty at any time. The nation's officer corps still suffered from the promotion and retention of generals due to their political loyalties, not their professional abilities. Corruption and incompetence among officers was endemic, with some "raising it almost to an art form." To mollify his critics, President Thiệu sacked the II and IV Corps commanders, Generals Nguyễn Văn Toàn and Nguyễn Vĩnh Nghi, both Thiệu loyalists notorious for corruption. Unfortunately, both men were also proven leaders, popular with their troops, and versatile on the battlefield. In 1972, general Creighton Abrams fumed at ARVN complaints that they lacked arms and equipment, saying that the ARVN had not lost their tanks due to enemy action, but rather because their crews had abandoned them, before subsequently claiming that even if the had the IS-3 heavy tank, they would not have fared any better. He likewise harangued President Thieu and Saigon's chief of staff Cao Van Vien: “Equipment is not what you need. You need men that will fight... You've got all the equipment you need... You lost most of your artillery because it was abandoned.”

Severe cutbacks in U.S. aid directly affected military performance. Artillery batteries previously allocated 100 rounds per day were reduced to firing only four daily. Each ARVN soldier was restricted to only 85 bullets per month. Because of fuel shortages and a lack of spare parts, sorties by South Vietnamese helicopter and cargo aircraft shrank by 50 to 70 percent. Due to President Thiệu's "no surrender of territory" command, the army was stretched to the limit defending terrain along a 600-mile frontier. Even the nation's strategic reserve, the Airborne and Marine Divisions, were occupied in static defensive roles. The ARVN, schooled by the Americans in rapid mobility and application of massive firepower, were losing the ability to deliver either. The military situation was exacerbated by the collapse of the South Vietnamese economy and a massive influx of refugees into the cities. (Note: Worldwide rises in fuel prices, a result of the Arab oil embargo instituted in 1972 and poor rice harvests throughout Asia directly affected South Vietnam's military and economic situation.)

During the same period, the North Vietnamese were recovering from losses incurred during the Easter Offensive of 1972 by replacing personnel and modernizing their equipment with a new influx of Soviet and Chinese military aid. During 1973, North Vietnam received 2.8 million metric tons of goods (worth $330 million) from communist-bloc countries, a 50 percent increase over the previous year. In 1974 that total increased to 3.5 million metric tons ($400 million) (according to CIA), while the South's aid was slashed to only $965 million per year, down from $2.2 billion. As a result, while South Vietnam suffered a multitude of issues with replacing losses and/or bolstering their military strength, North Vietnam had little trouble doing both.

==== PAVN ====
By the end of 1974, the North Vietnamese General Staff had created two army corps headquarters, matching South Vietnam's command and control structure in the I and II Corps Tactical Zones. Most independent PAVN infantry regiments in the south were also combined into divisional structures. A U.S. Defense Attaché Office (DAO) (established in 1973 to replace MACV, the 50 officers and men of the DAO coordinated all military assistance to South Vietnam) report concluded that the PAVN had increased their strategic reserve from two divisions to seven, making 70,000 additional troops available to augment the 200,000 combat and 100,000 support troops already in South Vietnam.

The PAVN high command also recognized the need for improvements to their logistical network to facilitate the transport of sufficient supplies of food, weapons, and ammunition necessary for continuous large-scale operations. By 1973 the 559th Transportation Group, which controlled the Ho Chi Minh Trail in southeastern Laos, was ordered to expand east of the Trường Sơn Mountains and directly into South Vietnam. The new logistical route, Corridor 613, ran inside South Vietnam from the DMZ to all the way to Lộc Ninh. Besides creating the new extension, the 559th upgraded its entire network, constructing all-weather, hard-surfaced roads to accommodate the modern mechanized army that had been rebuilt since the Paris Accords. The work required two years to complete, but the time required for the transport of personnel from North Vietnam to the southernmost seat of battle was reduced from four months to three weeks.

One of the most threatening features of the new North Vietnamese build-up was the air defense network that was established within South Vietnam, which by 1975 consisted of twenty-two regiments equipped with radar-controlled gun systems and formidable SA-2 Guideline and shoulder-launched SA-7 Grail anti-aircraft missiles. Such systems posed a major deterrent to the Republic of Vietnam Air Force (VNAF), since its aircraft were not equipped to deal with such threats. As a result, VNAF aerial interdiction of the communist logistical build-up became almost impossible and reconnaissance flights were held to a minimum. Ironically, the U.S. decision to provide the VNAF with unsophisticated aircraft was motivated, in part, by the fear that better aircraft would tempt the South Vietnamese to initiate operations over North Vietnam. The less capable aircraft would keep the fighting at a relatively lower level, enhancing the possibility of negotiations. This lack of active intelligence collection made estimation of North Vietnamese strength and intentions much more difficult.

However, deficiencies of the PAVN's armored and heavy artillery forces, essential for attacks on heavily fortified ARVN regimental and divisional base camps, weighed heavily on the minds of the General Staff planners who drew up the plan presented to the Politburo in October 1974. Much attention was focused on the role ARVN's ammunition shortages played in the collapse of South Vietnam, but it is not known if the PAVN suffered similar shortages. Soviet and Chinese military aid, especially in the category of "offensive weapon" (armor and artillery), declined significantly since the Paris Accords. Also, much of PAVN's armor and artillery was in poor condition, and spare parts were in short supply. Most PAVN artillery units, especially in the South, were still equipped only with light mortar, recoilless gun, or single-tube rocket launchers. In the COSVN area of operations, consisting of the southern half of the country, seven infantry divisions (the 3rd, 4th, 5th, 6th, 7th, 8th and 9th) and one corps headquarters (4th Corps) were supported by only five battalions of field artillery, two of which were equipped with captured US-made weapons for which there was little ammunition, and three understrength armored battalions. The PAVN's 2nd Corps, with three artillery regiments belonging to its three infantry divisions, a corps artillery brigade, a tank brigade, and a separate armored battalion, could field a grand total of only 89 tanks and armored personnel carrier and 87 towed artillery pieces when it set off to attack Saigon in April 1975. The PAVN's armored vehicle situation was so bad that it forced the PAVN to use obsolete T-34 tanks and SU-100 tank destroyers in the offensive.

Both ARVN and PAVN tanks and heavy artillery (field artillery and mortars 85mm or larger in caliber) suffered severe ammunition shortages. PAVN General Văn Tiến Dũng wrote that, compared to 1973, the 1974 ARVN's "firepower had decreased by nearly 60 percent because of bomb and ammunition shortages. Its mobility was also reduced by half due to lack of aircraft, vehicles, and fuel... The reduction of U.S. aid made it impossible for the puppet troops to carry out their combat plans and build up their forces." Reduction in firepower continued throughout the next year as the ARVN attempted to conserve ammunition. In the heavy fighting of July 1974 through March 1975, the ARVN expended an average of 18,267 tons of ammunition per month, compared to 66,500 tons per month in 1972, a more than 72% reduction. On the other side, PAVN's entire stock of heavy artillery and tank ammunition in 1974, including all ammunition held by combat units at forward warehouses, and in the PAVN's strategic reserves, totaled just 100,000 rounds. The ammunition problem was so serious that the PAVN artillery command had to replace the larger weapons in a number of units with obsolete 76.2 mm and 57 mm artillery pieces drawn out of storage for which there still was adequate ammunition. Consequently, the offensive would rely partly on captured ARVN stocks.

Many historians maintain that given the massive reductions in US military aid to South Vietnam after 1973, any major PAVN offensive was bound to succeed. However, the ARVN's soldiers were hardened veterans, and South Vietnam maintained vast stockpiles of ammunition and equipment (as demonstrated by the massive quantities of war materiel captured by the PAVN when the war ended). The final collapse of the ARVN may well have been inevitable, but the end would have been much bloodier and much longer in coming had the PAVN chosen a more direct, conventional plan of attack. In fact, the most damaging blow of the entire PAVN campaign may have been the crushing psychological blow their skillful and unexpected strategy dealt to the mind of the ARVN's commander-in-chief.

== First steps ==
=== Phước Long ===
Phước Long was the northernmost provincial capital in III Corps, approximately 75 miles (121 km) northeast of Saigon. At the end of December 1974, the North Vietnamese 7th and 3rd Divisions, an independent infantry regiment, and armored, anti-aircraft, and heavy artillery support moved out of Cambodia to attack. The province was defended by five Regional Force battalions, 48 Popular Force platoons and four territorial artillery sections. From his headquarters at Biên Hòa, Lieutenant General Dư Quốc Đống, the III Corps commander, augmented this force by sending in the 2nd Battalion, 7th Infantry Regiment of the 5th Division, two artillery sections, and three reconnaissance companies. The battle for the province began on 13 December when PAVN forces began to isolate Phước Long City's overland communications and eliminating static outposts. They then began to bombard Phước Long accurately with heavy artillery and launched a concerted armor/infantry ground attack on the 27th.

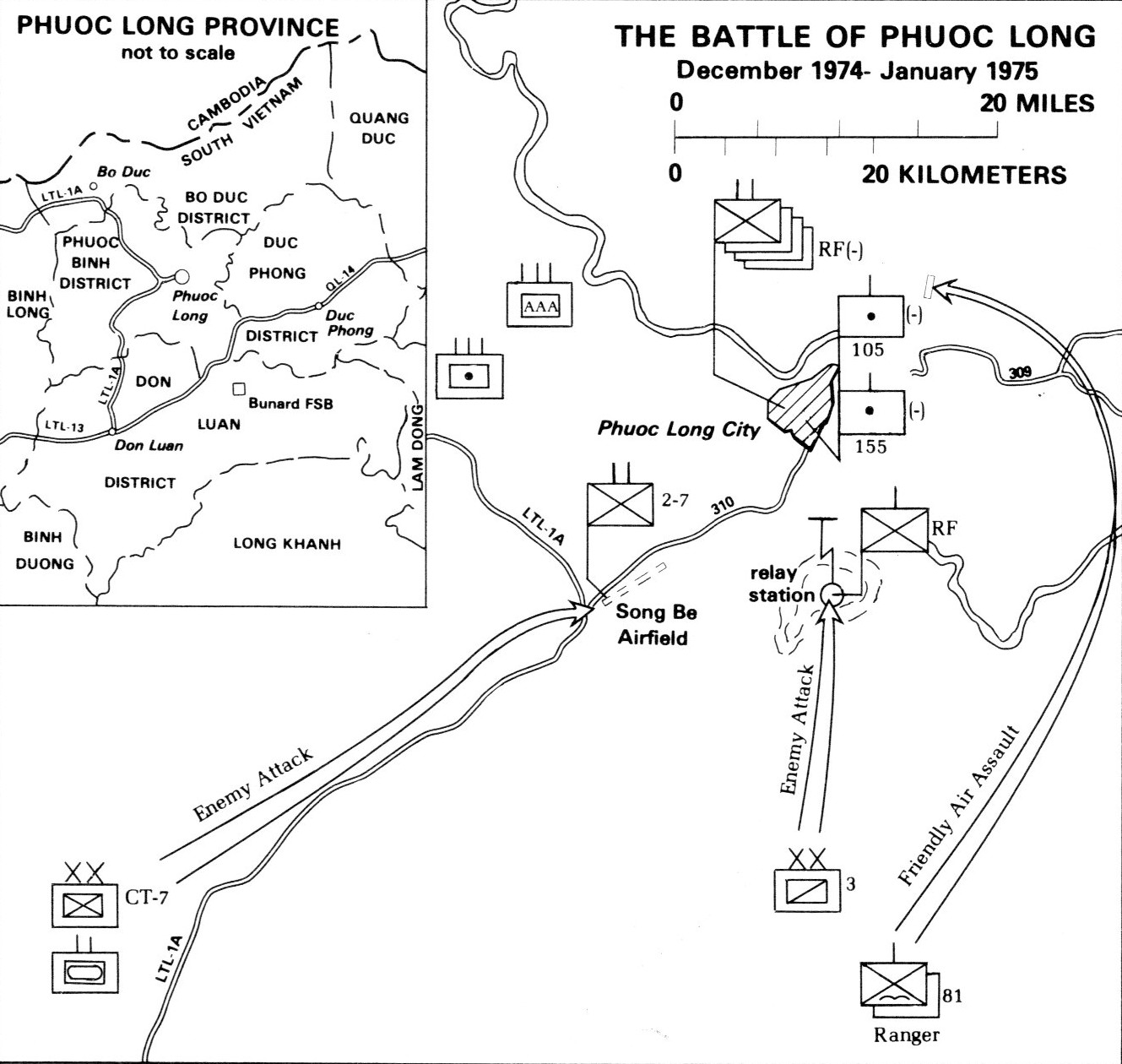
Battle of Phước Long

Any counterattack or relief effort contemplated by the South Vietnamese was doomed by the thousands of refugees that took to the roads in order to escape the fighting. Desertion among ARVN units became common, as soldiers began disappearing from the ranks in search of family members. (Note: It was common for family members to accompany soldiers to their areas of operations. This policy served as a boost to troop morale, but it also tended to fix ARVN units to particular geographic areas, reducing the ability to move units to other threatened zones.) This pattern was to become too common as the offensive continued, not just among the territorial forces, but among the regular troops.

On 2 January an emergency meeting was held at the Independence Palace in Saigon between President Thiệu, the Joint General Staff, and General Đống. At the meeting, Đống presented a plan for the relief of Phước Long that would have utilized either an infantry division or the Airborne Division. The plan was turned down for three reasons: first, there were simply no reserve forces of sufficient size available anywhere in the country for the task; second, with all overland routes in enemy hands, all movements and logistics would have to depend entirely on airlift, a capability that no longer existed; and third, despite advantageous defensive positions, the forces at Phước Long could not hold off two PAVN divisions long enough for any relief effort to succeed. The decision was then reached. Phước Long City and province would be surrendered to PAVN forces as a matter of expediency, since it was considered to be strategically less important than Tây Ninh, Pleiku, or Huế – economically, politically, and demographically.

The fighting around Phước Long continued until 6 January 1975, after which the town became the first provincial capital permanently seized by PAVN. Of the more than 5,400 ARVN troops originally committed to the battle, only 850 returned to government lines. The PAVN captured 10,000 rounds of artillery ammunition. More important for the North Vietnamese was the apparent total indifference with which the U.S. regarded this loss. The psychological blow for the government and people of South Vietnam was severe. According to the chief of the ARVN General Staff, General Cao Văn Viên, "Almost gone was the hope that the United States would forcibly punish the North Vietnamese for their brazen violations of the cease-fire agreement ... What more encouragement could the communists have asked for?"

Word of the fall of Phước Long reached the North Vietnamese Politburo in the midst of its Twenty-third Plenum, and the body immediately ordered the General Staff to develop a follow-up plan. The Politburo's assessment that the United States would not re-intervene in the war was proven correct, the weakness of the ARVN's defenses had been exposed, and, just as important, a solution to their most critical ammunition shortage – targeting and capturing ARVN artillery stocks – was found. Lê Duẩn declared that "Never have we had military and political conditions so perfect or a strategic advantage so great as we have now." The first target chosen was Duc Lap Camp, a border outpost in II Corp's Darlac Province. Once again, Trần Văn Trà's influence drove some members to propose a bolder plan: attack Buôn Ma Thuột, the provincial capital. This time, Lê Duẩn was reluctant to agree, that is until Lê Đức Thọ threw his weight behind the more radical strategy. General Dũng was ordered south to take direct command of the new offensive, which had been named Operation 275 (Chiến dịch 275). Coming along with him to the Central Highlands was a group codenamed Detachment A75 (Đoàn A75), which included his deputy - Maj. Gen. Lê Ngọc Hiền and Chief of the General Logistics Department - Maj. Gen. Đinh Đức Thiện.

=== Operation 275 (Central Highland campaign) ===
General Dũng already worked out a plan for taking Buôn Ma Thuột. Called the "blossoming lotus", the objective was to avoid outlying South Vietnamese positions and strike at the primary target first, "like a flower bud slowly opening its petals." The plan for the 75,000–80,000 PAVN troops participating in the campaign was first to isolate Buôn Ma Thuột by cutting Highways 14, 19 and 21, precluding any South Vietnamese reinforcement. The 320th Division was then to neutralize outposts to the north and seize the Phuong Duc Airfield. The mission of the 10th Division was to then conduct the main attack on the city along Route 14.

Commanding his forces from Pleiku, Major General Phạm Văn Phú, the III Corps commander, was given adequate warnings of the impending North Vietnamese attacks, but they were not given serious consideration. Phú was deceived by an elaborate North Vietnamese communications charade and his belief that PAVN movements toward Buôn Ma Thuột were diversionary operations designed to distract him from the true objective, Pleiku. The defense of Buôn Ma Thuột, therefore, was entrusted to a single Ranger group and provincial Popular and Regional Force units composed mostly of Montagnards. They were augmented at the beginning of March by a headquarters detachmentand the 53rd Regiment of the 23rd Division.

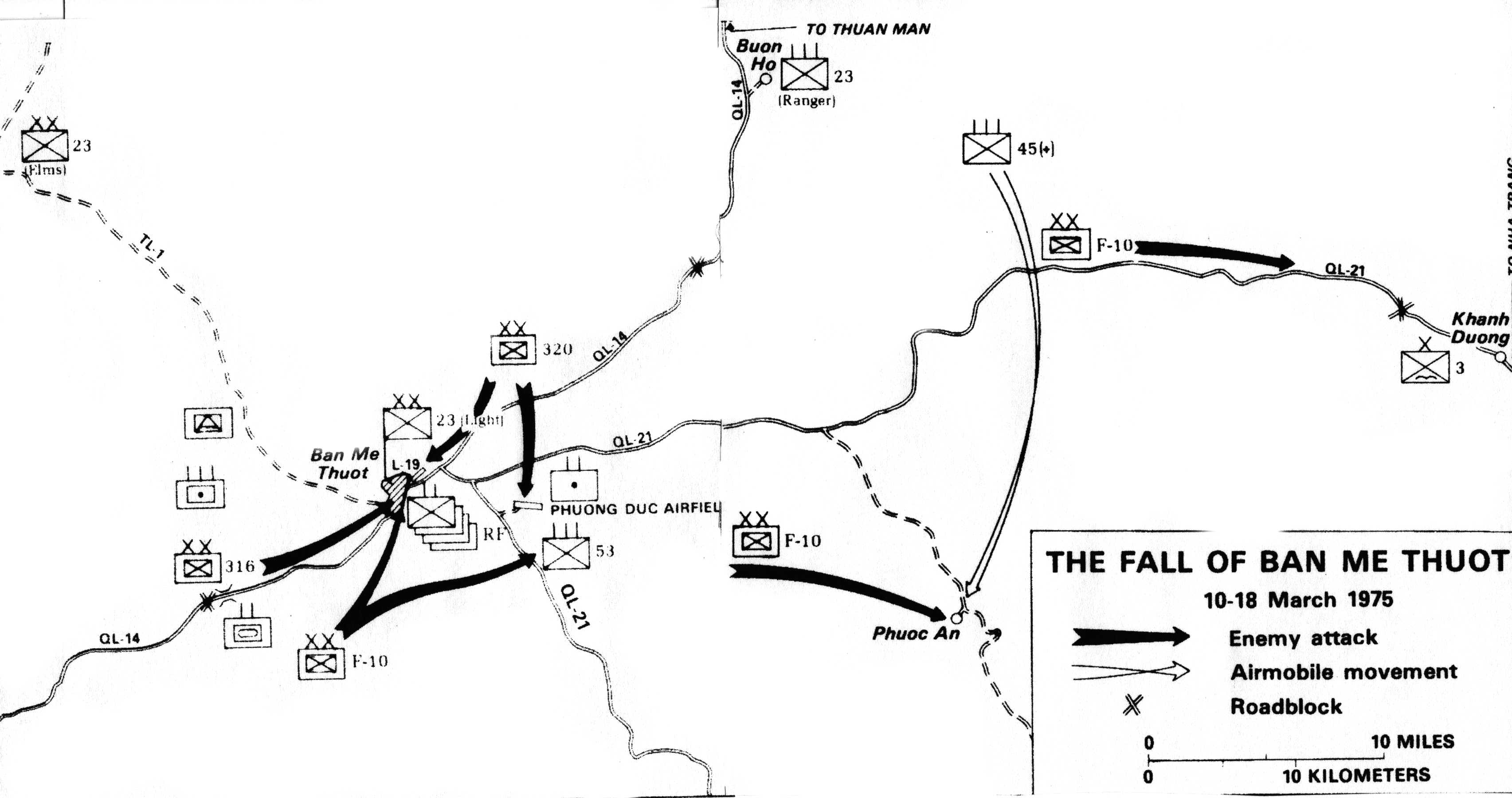
The fall of Buôn Ma Thuột

The battle for Buôn Ma Thuột began on 10 March 1975. Preceded by an intense artillery bombardment, the 10th Division quickly pushed into the city and seized the ammunition depot. That evening the 316th Division entered the battle for the city center. On the 13th, the ARVN 44th Regiment, 23rd Division and a battalion of the 21st Ranger Group were helilifted to Phước An, 20 miles (32 km) east of Buôn Ma Thuột, to form a relief force for the beleaguered city. The column, advancing into the path of thousands of refugees and military dependents fleeing the highlands, soon encountered the 10th Division. The South Vietnamese attack disintegrated and the force then retreated, joining the civilian exodus.

On 18 March, the PAVN had taken Phước An, eliminating any hope of reaching Buôn Ma Thuột. Darlac Province in its entirety then fell under North Vietnamese control. ARVN forces began to rapidly shift positions in an attempt to keep the PAVN from quickly pushing eastward to the coastal lowlands. In the final analysis, the blame for the fall of the highlands lies with General Phú, who refused to act on sound intelligence and when he realized his error, it was too late to get reinforcements to the scene.

Realising the weakened state of his army, President Thiệu sent a delegation to Washington in early March to request an increase in economic and military aid. U.S. Ambassador to South Vietnam Graham Martin, who believed additional aid would help the defense of the Republic, also made a trip to Washington to present the case to President Gerald R. Ford. The U.S. Congress, increasingly reluctant to divert money from economic recovery into what was seen as a lost cause, slashed a proposed $1.45 billion military aid package for 1975 to $700 million. The Ford administration, from the president on down, however, continued to encourage Thiệu in what the historian Arnold Isaacs called "the pipe dream that Congress would restore the funds it cut."

=== Reassessments ===
President Thiệu felt increased pressure. He became, in the words of one of his closest advisors, "suspicious...secretive...and ever watchful for a coup d'état against him." His increasing isolation began denying him "the services of competent people, adequate staff work, consultation, and coordination." Thiệu's military decisions were followed faithfully by his officer corps, who generally agreed with General Viên, that "Thiệu made all the decisions how the war should be conducted."

By 11 March, the day after Buôn Ma Thuột was attacked, Thiệu came to the conclusion there was no longer any hope of receiving a $300 million supplemental aid package he requested from the U.S. government. On that basis he called a meeting attended by Lieutenant General Đặng Văn Quang and General Viên. After reviewing the military situation, Thiệu pulled out a small-scale map of South Vietnam and discussed the possible redeployment of the armed forces to "hold and defend only those populous and flourishing areas which were most important."

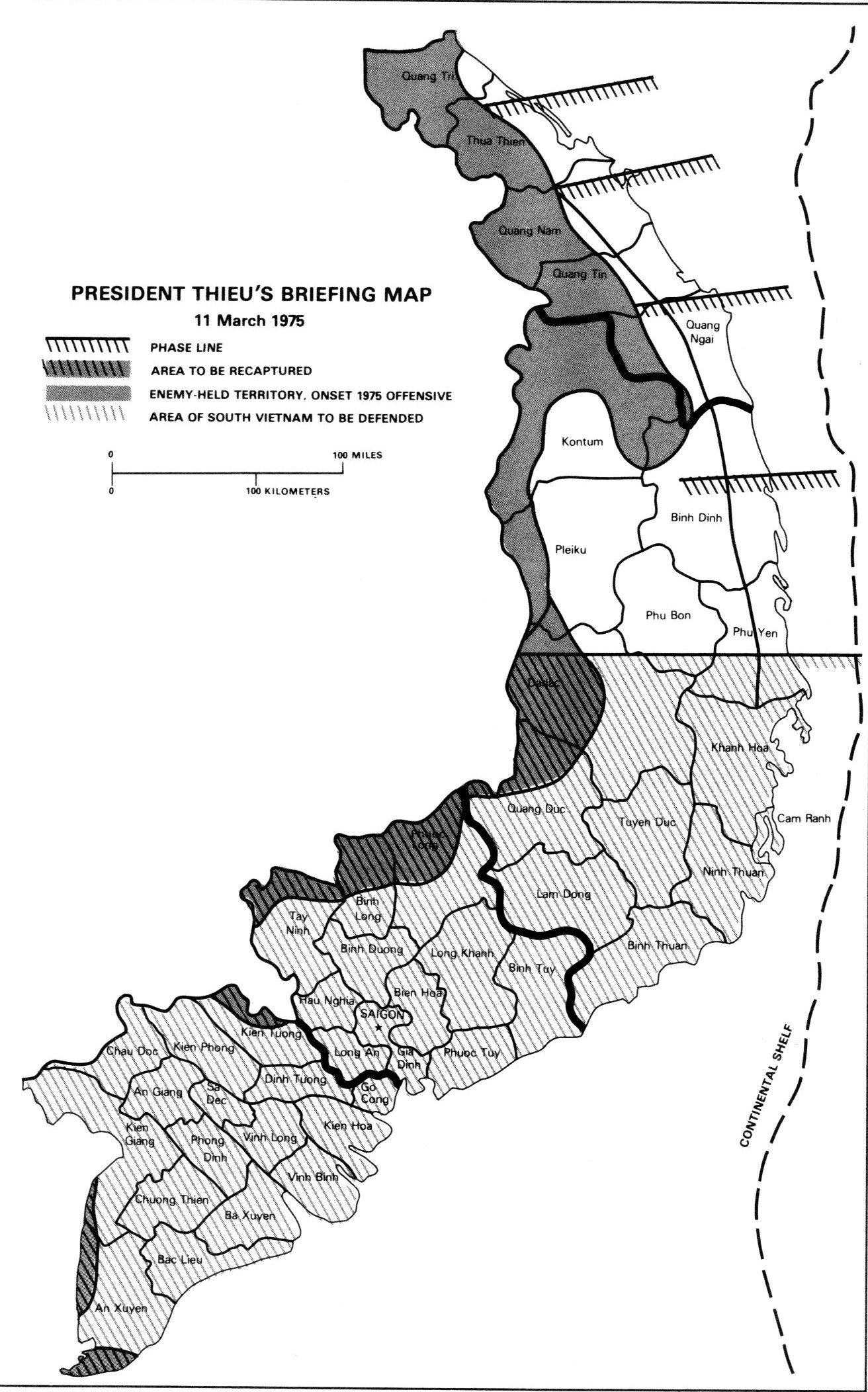
President Thiệu's briefing map

Thiệu then sketched in on the map the areas which he considered most important – all of the III and IV Corps Tactical Zones. He also pointed out the areas currently under PAVN/VC control which would have to be retaken. The key to the location of these operations were concentrations of natural resources – rice, rubber, industry, etc. Those areas that were to be held also included coastal areas where oil had been discovered on the continental shelf. These areas were to become, in Thiệu's words: "Our untouchable heartland, the irreducible national stronghold." As to the future of the I and II Corps Zones, he drew a series of phase lines on the map indicating that South Vietnamese forces should hold what they could, but that they could redeploy southward as circumstances dictated. Thiệu declared this new strategy as "Light at the top, heavy on the bottom." Viên informed Thiệu that he believed the redeployment was a necessary step, but refrained from mentioning he believed it was too late. Viên considered that a redeployment on such a scale should have been carried out by mid-1974 or, at the latest, as soon as President Nixon resigned from office. Vien also believed that, by the time Ban Mê Thuột fell, the North Vietnamese enjoyed a distinct local numerical superiority at any point, and that "extended and pressed the way we were" there was "little chance we could disengage from any place without being pursued and pressed on further." By then it was also obvious to General Staff that any redeployment would be hampered by a massive flow of civilian refugees from the abandoned areas and additional confusion caused by soldier's concerns (and desertions) over the fate of their dependents.

The critical decision for the Saigon government was made two days later at Cam Ranh Bay during a meeting between Thiệu and General Phú. Thiệu decided that Pleiku and Kontum were to be abandoned and that the forces defending them would be redeployed to retake demographically more important Ban Mê Thuột. Phú informed the president that the only route possible for the redeployment, given PAVN blocking actions, was little-used Interprovincial Route 7B, a neglected, narrow, rough-surfaced track (actually a logging road) with several downed bridges along its course.

Meanwhile, General Dũng advised Hanoi that he was turning his forces to capture Kontum and Pleiku. In Hanoi, Lê Duẩn was pressuring the General Staff to take advantage of the foothold they gained in the highlands. Two months remained before the monsoon season, when military operations would be forestalled. Further strategic gains appeared possible in light of Saigon's apparent weakness and the level of the U.S. response.

== ARVN collapse in the northern provinces ==
=== Debacle in the Central Highlands ===
General Phú then faced the monumental task of moving a corps-sized column of troops, equipment, and vehicles over a largely unknown road some 160 miles (260 km) through the mountains and jungles of the highlands to Nha Trang for the attempted counterattack. The force would consist of one battalion of the 44th ARVN Regiment, five Ranger groups, the 21st Tank Squadron, two 155 mm artillery battalions, one 175 mm battalion and Popular and Regional Force units. Also in train would be the men and equipment of the 20th Combat Engineer Group and the 231st Direct Support Group.

Phú's excessive preoccupation with secrecy, however, doomed the effort from the beginning. Operational planning was limited only to a few trusted subordinates who had either contributed to or knew about it. Staff work was non-existent. The chief of staff of II Corps, for example, admitted that he was completely in the dark about the planned abandonment of Pleiku and Kontum. Command of the convoy itself was handed over to the commander of the II Corps Rangers. Phú further muddied the command arrangements by appointing his assistant for operations to also oversee the withdrawal.

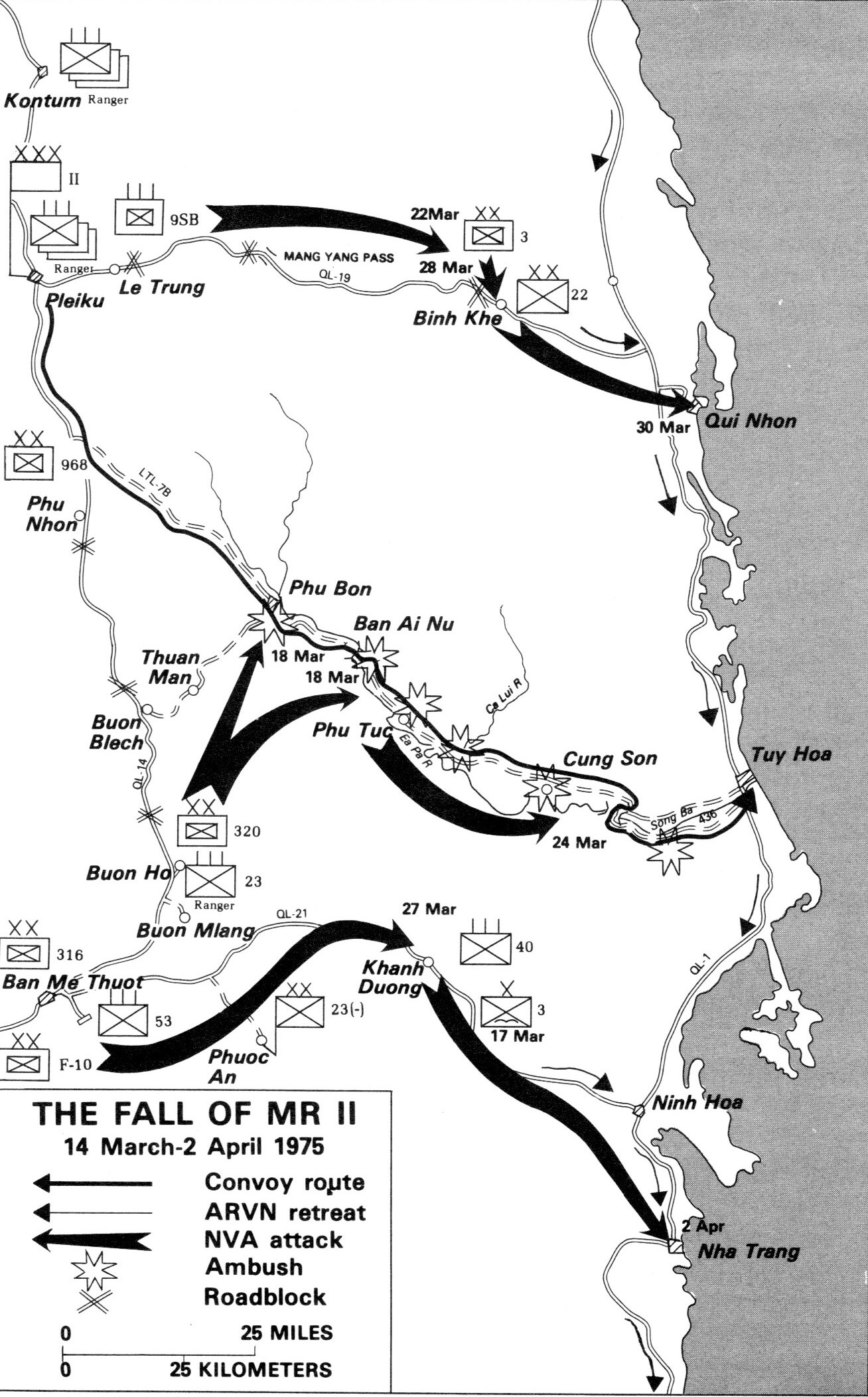
Collapse of the ARVN in the Central Highlands

During the first two days of the move (16 and 17 March) the effort went well, until, at Hau Bon, the column of refugees from the abandoned cities and the military convoys collided and became stuck. Making matters worse was that combat engineers had to complete a pontoon bridge across the Đà Rằng River. That night VC forces began to intercept and stall the mass of over 200,000 troops and refugees that was soon to be dubbed the "convoy of tears." Initially caught by surprise by the South Vietnamese withdrawal, General Dũng ordered his 320th Division to strike the flank of the column while coastal forces raced to halt its forward progress. The 968th Division was ordered to force its way through Pleiku and strike the tail of the retreat.

The following day the column only proceeded 15 miles (24 km) before it encountered a significant PAVN roadblock. From that point onward the exodus kept moving forward only by fighting its way ahead. "They hit us with everything" said Ranger Private Nguyen Van Sau, describing an unrelenting shower of artillery shells, mortar rounds and rockets that flew from the jungle into the stream of refugees. Upon reaching the Đà Rằng River, only 20 kilometers from Tuy Hòa, a pontoon bridge had to be helilifted to the column. By 22 March the bridge was completed, but the advance became more hazardous due to numerous PAVN units moving into blocking positions. During the entire movement, the VNAF provided minimal support due to bad weather. On 27 March the final roadblock was overcome and, at 21:00, the first vehicles of the column entered Tuy Hòa. "How many people in the original column survived the tragic journey, no one knew exactly." It was estimated by the ARVN that only 20,000 of the 60,000 troops that had started out from Pleiku finally reached the coast. Of the estimated 180,000 civilians that fled the highlands with the column, only about 60,000 got through. Those who failed to break through were either killed or taken prisoner by PAVN forces.

The retreat from the Central Highlands became a rout of strategic proportions. At least "75 percent of II Corps combat strength, including the 23rd Infantry Division, as well as Ranger, armor, artillery, engineer and signal units were tragically expended within ten days." The planned operation to retake Buôn Ma Thuột never materialized simply because II Corps no longer possessed any means to attempt it. Buoyed by their easy triumph, the PAVN 10th, 316th and 320th Divisions began to move toward the coast. The only thing stand before them was the ARVN 22nd Division, tasked with defending the mountain passes to the coast. However, by late March, these PAVN units would make it into Huế and Da Nang.

On 30 March the 22nd Division was ordered to proceed to the coast at Qui Nhơn for evacuation. North Vietnamese forces attacked them there from the north and two of the division's regiments had to fight their way through to the beaches for pick-up. At 02:00 on 1 April, what was left of the division was extracted by sea. Two regimental colonels, after being ordered to evacuate, refused to leave, preferring suicide rather than retreat or surrender. The division's third regiment, the 47th, ran into an ambush at Phù Cát and suffered heavy casualties, losing about half of its troops. When it later regrouped at Vũng Tàu, the 22nd numbered only slightly over 2,000 men.

=== Huế–Da Nang Campaign ===
The situation for the South Vietnamese in the I Corps Tactical Zone regained some stability after the defeat of a three-division PAVN push during late 1974. By early the following year, I Corps fielded three infantry divisions (the 1st, 2nd, and 3rd), the elite Airborne and Marine Divisions, four Ranger Groups and the 1st Armored Brigade. The northern provinces were under the command of one of South Vietnam's finest and most aggressive generals, Ngô Quang Trưởng. Until mid-March, the PAVN had limited their offensive operations to attempts to cut Highway 1, the main north–south line of communication, between Huế and Da Nang and between Da Nang and Chu Lai. To confront the South Vietnamese, PAVN Brigadier General Lê Trọng Tấn had amassed a force of five divisions and nine independent infantry regiments, three sapper regiments, three armored regiments, twelve anti-aircraft and eight artillery regiments.

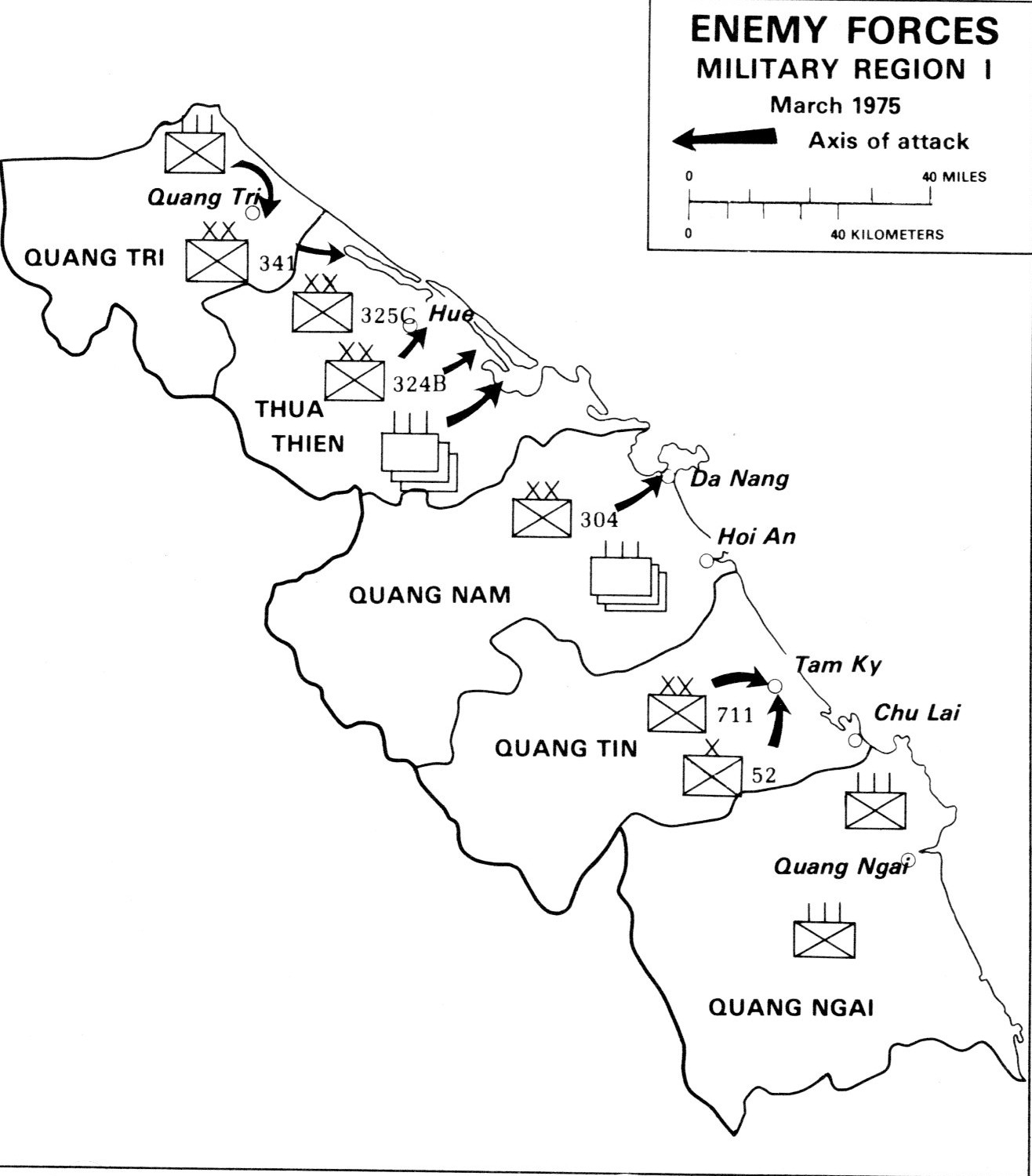
Initial phase of PAVN offensive in I Corps

At a meeting in Saigon on 13 March President Thiệu was briefed on the military situation by Trưởng and the new III Corps commander, Lieutenant General Nguyễn Văn Toàn. Thiệu then laid out his plan for national consolidation. As Trưởng understood it, he was free to redeploy his forces to hold the Da Nang area. This South Vietnam's second largest city was to be held due to possible future exploitation of offshore oil deposits. Trưởng was shocked to discover, however, that the Airborne Division was to be removed to III Corps. (Unknown to Trưởng at the time, the Marine Division was also already slated for redeployment with both units then forming a new national reserve).

General Trưởng was recalled to Saigon on 19 March to brief Thiệu on his withdrawal plan. The general developed two contingency plans: The first was predicated on government control of Highway 1, which would be utilized for two simultaneous withdrawals from Huế and Chu Lai to Da Nang; The second course presupposed PAVN interdiction of the highway and called for a withdrawal into three enclaves: Huế, Da Nang, and Chu Lai. This was to be only an interim measure, however, since the forces that withdrew to Huế and Chu Lai would then be sea-lifted to Da Nang by the Republic of Vietnam Navy. The president then stunned the general by announcing he misinterpreted his previous orders: Huế was not to be abandoned. Making matters worse, Trưởng discovered that his force was to be reduced by the removal of the Marine Division.

By the time of the second meeting it was obvious that the second plan was the only possible recourse, since any phased withdrawal along Highway 1 had become impossible. This was due to increasing PAVN pressure that the ARVN was barely containing and the enormous and uncontrolled flow of refugees along the highway. Trưởng then requested permission for a withdrawal of his forces into the three enclaves as planned and for the retention of the Marines. Thiệu's reply ordered him to "hold onto any territory he could with whatever forces he now had, including the Marine Division."

Trưởng returned to Da Nang the same day and was greeted by bad news. The PAVN had begun an all-out offensive in I Corps and already breached Trưởng's northern defense line at the Thạch Hãn River. President Thiệu made a nationwide radio broadcast that afternoon proclaiming that Huế would be held "at all costs." That evening Trưởng ordered a retreat to a new defense line at the My Chanh River, thereby ceding all of Quảng Trị Province to the PAVN. He was confident that his forces could hold Huế, but he was then astounded by a late afternoon message from the president that now ordered "that because of inability to simultaneously defend all three enclaves, the I Corps commander was free...to redeploy his forces for the defense of Da Nang only." Regardless of the president's reassurances, the people of Quảng Trị and Huế began to leave their homes by the tens of thousands, joining an ever-growing exodus toward Da Nang.

Meanwhile, the PAVN offensive was slowly rolling over ARVN opposition north and south of Da Nang. General Dong's plan called for attacks on the area from the west, north, and south that would drive South Vietnamese forces into Da Nang, where they could be destroyed. The highway between Huế and Da Nang was cut at Phú Lộc after severe fighting on 22 March. South of Da Nang, the ARVN 2nd Division barely managed to contain a PAVN drive toward Tam Kỳ and the coastal plain. On the morning of 24 March, however, the 711th Division, backed by armored elements, seized Tam Kỳ, driving the population north toward Da Nang by the thousands. PAVN forces then cut Highway 1 between Quảng Ngãi and Chu Lai, a move to which the 2nd Division was too battered to respond. With Corps approval, South Vietnamese troops from Quảng Ngãi fought their way northward, but only a few managed to reach Chu Lai. In a single day the situation in I Corps had deteriorated beyond control.

With the withdrawal to the three enclaves completed, Trưởng issued the following orders: the 1st Division and other units in the Huế area were to withdraw overland toward Da Nang while the Marine elements were to be retrieved by ship from Huế; the 2nd Division, its dependents, and the remains of the Quảng Ngãi sector forces were to withdraw by sea to Re Island, 20 miles (32 km) offshore from Chu Lai. This effort was undertaken in order for Trưởng to obey a Joint General Staff directive that he conduct the defense of Da Nang without the Marines, who were to be withdrawn to the south. The same lack of planning and hasty withdrawal along unprotected routes to meet the evacuation deadline cost the 2nd Division two-thirds of its men and most of its equipment. Only 7,000 troops and around 3,000 civilians were evacuated from Chu Lai.

During 26 March, command and control collapsed and discipline in the 1st Division eroded after its commander told his men "We've been betrayed ... It is now sauve qui peut (every man for himself) ... See you in Da Nang." The overland march, pummelled by artillery the entire way, degenerated into chaos as it moved toward Da Nang. No sooner had the remains of the force reached the city than soldiers began to melt away, searching for their dependents. On the coast near Huế, only one regiment of the 1st Division, about 600 marines and 7,700 civilians were picked up by naval vessels. With escape impossible, five battalion commanders of the Marine Division said their farewells and then shot themselves rather than face capture.

From the north, two PAVN divisions, along with armor and artillery elements, enveloped the western flank of Da Nang. To the south, two more divisions closed in and brought the center of the city into artillery range. Da Nang then collapsed into anarchy and chaos. "Hunger, looting, and crimes were widespread. Traffic was impossible...the mass stranded in the city was estimated at one and one-half million." At noon on 28 March, with a coherent defense of the city becoming impossible, Trưởng requested permission to evacuate by sea, but Thiệu, baffled, refused to commit himself to a clear-cut decision. "He did not tell General Trưởng whether to withdraw or to hold and fight" said General Viên, who was with Thiệu. When his communications with Saigon were cut, and on his own initiative, Trưởng ordered a naval withdrawal that was to begin the following morning, 29 March.

Thousands of soldiers and civilians rushed for the sea, where hundreds drowned trying to reach the ships that could not dock due to the low tide. Thousands more died under the continuous PAVN artillery barrage. Of the ARVN's four infantry divisions, four Ranger groups, armored brigade, air division and thousands of territorial, support, and staff personnel, only around 16,000 were evacuated as the PAVN swept in on 29 March. Of the almost two million civilians that packed Da Nang at the end of March, a little more than 50,000 were evacuated during the sea lift. Left behind were 70,000 ARVN troops taken prisoner by northern forces. Also abandoned were 33 undamaged VNAF A-37 jet fighters at Da Nang Air Base and nearly 60 more aircraft at Phù Cát Air Base. During the fall of Da Nang no pitched battles had been fought and few of the ARVN troops stationed in and around the city had even raised their rifles in its defense. In quick succession the few remaining centers of resistance along the coastline "fell like a row of porcelain vases sliding off a shelf": Quảng Ngãi on 24 March; Qui Nhơn and Nha Trang on 1 April; and Cam Ranh Bay on 3 April.

== Ho Chi Minh Campaign ==
=== Xuân Lộc ===
By 25 March the North Vietnamese Politburo no longer felt it was necessary to wait until 1976 for the initiation of its final offensive against Saigon. General Dũng was ordered to abandon the long-standing doctrine of meticulous planning and methodical preparation of the battlefield in order that the "puppet regime" could be crushed and the war ended. The only obstacle to that goal was moving his northern forces 370 miles (600 km) (the reserve divisions in North Vietnam would have to move 1,000 miles (1,600 km)) south in order to participate in the attack on the capital Saigon. In one of the most complex logistical feats of the war, he proceeded to do just that.

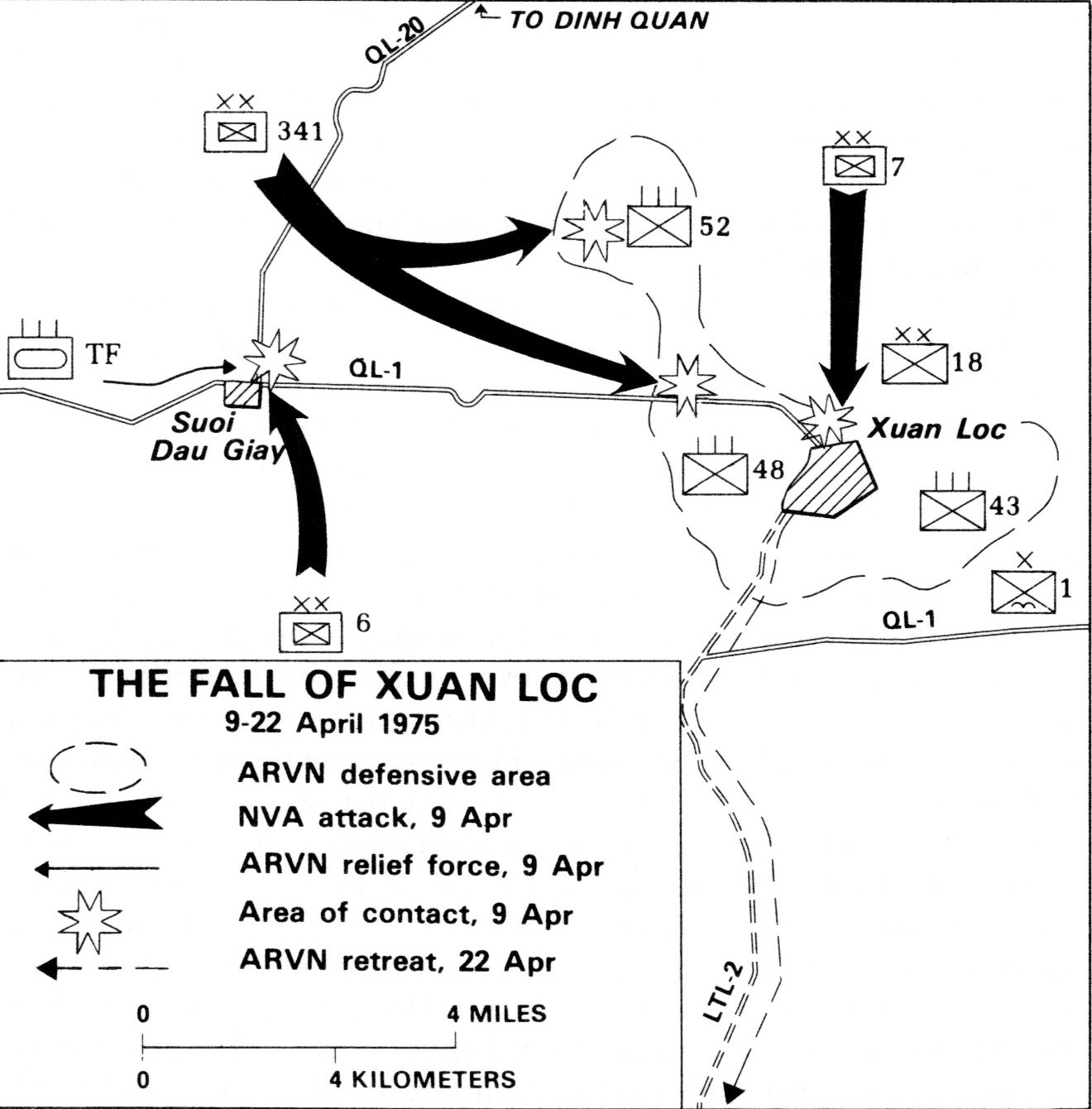
Battle of Xuân Lộc

On 7 April Lê Đức Thọ arrived at Dũng's headquarters near Loc Ninh to oversee the final battles as the Politburo's representative. Dũng and his staff had basically adapted Tra's original plan and prepared a three-pronged attack that would be led by the 4th Corps, which would seize the vital highway intersection at Xuân Lộc, the capital of Long Khánh Province and "the gateway to Saigon." The capture of the crossroads would open the way to Biên Hòa (where 60 percent of South Vietnam's remaining ammunition was stockpiled) and Saigon's strategic eastern approaches. This effort was placed under the command of General Lê Trọng Tấn, the "conqueror of Da Nang." To divert Saigon's attention and prevent the reinforcement of Xuân Lộc, the recently activated 223rd Tactical Group would cut off Route 4, severing Saigon from the Mekong Delta. Simultaneously, the 3rd Corps would conduct another diversionary operation around Tây Ninh.

To support the effort, other PAVN elements would close on the city from the west and south. Since no code name had been applied to the new offensive, Dũng suggested that it be named the Ho Chi Minh Campaign. The Politburo concurred on 14 April. Lê Đức Thọ then passed on a message from Tôn Đức Thắng, president of North Vietnam to General Dũng: "You must win. Otherwise, do not return."

The defense of Xuân Lộc had been entrusted to the 18th Division, reinforced by the 8th Regiment of the 5th Division, the 3rd Armored Brigade, two Ranger and two artillery battalions and the 81st Airborne Ranger Group. The week-long fighting that erupted on 8 April raged in and around Xuân Lộc and became the most significant engagement of the entire offensive. The initial attack was conducted by the PAVN 341st and 3rd Divisions, which attacked headlong into the town, a tactic widely used before, hoping to quickly rout the defender. However, they had to call off the attack after meeting 2 weeks of heavy resistance and effective fire support which cost them dearly. The attackers were then reinforced by the 7th Division.

After the interdiction of an ARVN armored task force sent to the relief of the town along Route 1, the 1st Airborne Brigade was helilifted into the outskirts of the town. The South Vietnamese committed 25,000 troops to the battle, almost one-third of the remainder of their reserve forces. For the first time since the onset of the North Vietnamese offensive, the VNAF consistently provided effective close air support to the defenders. Even General Dũng was impressed by "the stubbornness of the enemy" in what became a "meat grinder."

On 14 April General Dũng received new instructions from Hanoi. "We must be in Saigon to celebrate Ho Chi Minh's birthday." That deadline, 19 May, was only one month away. At that point, Dũng decided to bypass the defenders at Xuân Lộc and commenced the shelling of Biên Hòa Air Base, effectively ending air support. The PAVN also shifted their original target, instead of charging straight at the town, they instead attacked and destroyed the outposts around Xuân Lộc, cutting off the 18th Division from their reinforcements. Threatened with encirclement, the 18th Division managed to conduct a retreat to the south along Route 2. After more than three weeks of intense fighting, the 18th Division alone suffered 30 percent casualties (around 4000 soldiers) while dealing over 5,000 North Vietnamese casualties and destroying 37 tanks and vehicles. However, their defences made no differences to the outcome of the war, as the 18th disintegrated shortly after in the fighting around Biên Hòa. With all of Long Khánh Province under PAVN control, General Dũng was free to completely encircle Saigon with his forces.

=== Saigon and Mekong Delta ===
Even after the loss of Da Nang, "the worst single disaster in the history of South Vietnam", the Ford administration continued to disbelieve that the Saigon regime was failing. On 10 April President Ford went to Congress to request a $722 million supplemental military aid package for South Vietnam plus $250 million in economic and refugee aid. The president's rationale for the aid had changed. He stated before the Senate Foreign Relations Committee that he feared that "If we say 'no more money' Thiệu...won't do something totally irrational." In other words, it was possible that if the aid was not delivered, the South Vietnamese might turn on the Americans still within South Vietnam and hold them for ransom. Congress was not impressed, believing that the administration might simply be stalling the evacuation of remaining U.S. personnel and civilians in order to force the aid bill through. On 17 April the discussion was ended. There would be no more funds for Saigon.

The ARVN III Corps commander, General Toan, organized five centers of resistance for the defense of the city. These fronts were so connected as to form an arc enveloping the area west, north, and east of the capital. The Cu Chi front, to the northwest, was defended by the 25th Division; the Bình Dương front, to the north, was the responsibility of the 5th Division; the Biên Hòa front, to the northeast, was defended by the 18th Division; the Vũng Tàu and Route 15 front, to the southeast, was held by the 1st Airborne Brigade and one battalion of the 3rd Division; and the Long An front, for which the Capital Military District Command was responsible, was defended by elements of the re-formed 22nd Division. South Vietnamese defensive forces around Saigon totaled approximately 60,000 troops.

On 17 April the Cambodian capital of Phnom Penh fell to the Khmer Rouge, and the US did nothing for their former ally. On 21 April 1975, Thiệu, under intense political pressure, resigned as president when his closest domestic allies began losing confidence over his handling of the war. In his televised farewell speech, Thiệu admitted, for the first time, having ordered the evacuation of the Central Highlands and the north that led to debacle. He then stated that it was the inevitable course of action in the situation – but also insisted it was the generals who failed him. He went on to excoriate the U.S., attacking "our great ally...the leader of the free world ... The United States has not respected its promises" he declared "It is inhumane. It is not trustworthy. It is irresponsible. Immediately following the speech, the presidency was handed over to Vice President Trần Văn Hương.

At his new forward command post at Ben Cat, General Dũng prepared plans for the final battle. He encircled Saigon with four PAVN corps and the hastily assembled 232nd Tactical Force, a total of 19 divisions plus supporting artillery and armored units, approximately 130,000 men. His plan was to avoid intensive street fighting within the city itself by first tying down outlying South Vietnamese forces in their defensive positions and then launching five spearheads through them into the city, each of which had a specific target: the Independence Palace, the Joint General Staff headquarters, the National Police headquarters, Tan Son Nhut Air Base and the Special Capital Zone headquarters. The attacks on the periphery began on 26 April and the main attack on the city center began the following day.

After Thiệu's resignation, the South Vietnamese military situation increasingly declined. On the 26th, the PAVN launched an all-out attack to take Biên Hòa and the sprawling logistical complex at Long Binh from the south and southeast. Three days later, the port city of Vũng Tàu was under assault and the pressure against the Cu Chi front was intense.

The same disorganization, loss of control, and anarchy that befell I and II Corps now took place in Saigon, where martial law was imposed to control the chaos and lawlessness. Although contemplation of a communist victory by that time had created severe shock in many parts of South Vietnamese society, most did little or nothing to forestall it. A repeat of the Massacre at Huế, albeit on a much larger scale, was promoted by the government as a propaganda ploy since the beginning of the offensive in an effort to unify the population, but it provoked only an overreaction and caused almost complete paralysis when the time came to defend the city.

As the main attack developed on April 27th, the South Vietnamese General Assembly handed over the presidency to General Dương Văn Minh, who was sworn in the following day. It was widely assumed that Minh, who had no history of aggressive action against the communists, would be able to establish a cease-fire and re-open negotiations. However, for the first time since the First Indochina War, the communists held the upper hand on the battlefield and victory was within reach, regardless of any political changes in Saigon. As a result, they were not willing to agree to a ceasefire, even with Minh at the helm.

The inauguration of Minh served as a signal to South Vietnamese officers who "would make no compromise with the communists", and were responsible for the torture and imprisonment of many VC agents and their sympathizers. They began to pack up and try to find a way out of the country. The aerial evacuation of U.S. personnel and civilians had commenced on 1 April from Tan Son Nhut. It was during this evacuation that U.S. Marine Corps Lance Corporal Darwin Judge and Corporal Charles McMahon, Jr., who were manning a checkpoint at the base's main gate, were killed during a rocket attack. They were the last American servicemen killed in Vietnam. At 10:51 on 29 April Operation Frequent Wind, the U.S. helicopter evacuation of military and embassy personnel, U.S. civilians, and South Vietnamese citizens thought to be at risk of communist reprisal, was implemented as the city descended into pandemonium. By the end of the evacuation, more than 40 ships of the U.S. Seventh Fleet had collected 1,373 Americans and 5,595 Vietnamese from U.S. helicopters and some 60,000 from boats and aircraft. Total evacuees included 57,507 removed by air and 73,000 by sea.

On 28 April PAVN forces fought their way into the outskirts of the city. At the Newport Bridge (Cầu Tân Cảng), about 3 miles (4.8 km) from the city center, ARVN soldiers battled with PAVN troops attempting to control the span, cutting the city's last overland connection to the south and gaining immediate access to downtown Saigon. Later that afternoon, as President Minh finished his acceptance speech, a formation of four A-37s, captured from VNAF, bombed Tan Son Nhut Air Base. As Biên Hòa was falling, General Toan fled to Saigon, informing the government that most of the top ARVN leadership resigned themselves to defeat.

Despite the increased disintegration of the ARVN, the PAVN faced heavy resistance, even counterattack attempts to push them out. The outskirts and downtown of the city become battlefields, where PAVN/VC fought against a rag-tag formation of ARVN soldiers who made their way into Saigon, but couldn't be evacuated. These men, betrayed by their commanders, either stripped off their uniforms and hid, or made suicidal assault at the enemy, hoping for a quick death. Those units tasked with capturing key structures found themselves at the receiving end of a more disciplined force commanded by officers denied their evacuation. These men would take advantage of the equipment left over by their escaped comrades and set a perimeter around the city. However, despite all efforts, a loose combination of troops either wanting to flee or wanting to kill as many communists as possible before their deaths, mostly leaderless and cut off from supplies, could not hope to stand against a disciplined army with artillery and armored support.

At 4:58 a.m on 30 April, U.S. Ambassador Martin boarded a helicopter and departed from the US Embassy, Saigon on one of the last American evacuation flights. At 07:53 the last U.S. Marines were lifted from the roof of the U.S. Embassy. At 10:24 am. President Minh ordered all South Vietnamese forces to cease fighting. Later Minh would be escorted to a radio station, from which he declared the unconditional surrender of his government. Around noon, a PAVN tank, number 390, crashed through the gates of the Independence Palace. A crewman from the 843, which rammed into the side gate and got stuck, jumped out, ran up the steps, carrying the flag of the Provisional Revolutionary Government. A Western reporter on the scene asked the soldier his name and the man replied, "Nguyễn Văn Thiệu."

The total number of South Vietnamese evacuated by the U.S. or self-evacuated and ending up in the custody of the United States for processing as refugees to enter the United States totaled 138,869.

In the Mekong Delta, where South Vietnamese military forces still appeared intact and aggressive, IV Corps deputy commander Brigadier General Lê Văn Hưng planned to build a "secret section", to use the delta's agricultural wealth to form a resistance. Lê Văn Hưng created a secret campaign "Operation Linking Hands" to send the remaining ARVN soldiers and officers to hidden jungle locations and military bases places in Mekong Delta to form a prolonged counteroffensive against the PAVN/VC hoping for another ceasefire in early summer 1975 and keeping parts of the Mekong Delta as South Vietnam. Weeks before the Fall of Saigon, most of the provincial capitals in IV Corps were stable defended by aggressive ARVN military defenses.

However, VC units began to engage ARVN forces and succeeded in isolating IV Corps from Saigon which put an end to the "secret section" plan. When President Minh announced the surrender of South Vietnam, IV Corps started to disintegrate. Both Lê Văn Hưng and IV Corps commander Nguyễn Khoa Nam disagreed with the surrender order. At 8 pm, VC units captured some regional districts in Mekong Delta. Although Lê Văn Hưng and a number of ARVN soldiers planned to continue to battle against VC units in Can Tho, many residents of Can Tho opposed continued resistance believing the VC would start shelling Can Tho causing numerous casualties in the city.

Lê Văn Hưng agreed to stand down the defense of Can Tho due to the poor options for escape or prolonged defense. Around 8 P.M, Lê Văn Hưng told his remaining soldiers that he did not want to endure a siege similar to what he had experienced at An Lộc in 1972. He later committed suicide and the defense of Can Tho was finished. IV Corps was dissolved shortly after. On the same day, Brigadier General Trần Văn Hai committed suicide in Dong Tam Base Camp.

The other ARVN general in the Mekong Delta, Major Nguyễn Khoa Nam, also committed suicide after the surrender, in the early morning of 1 May 1975 at his IV Corps headquarters in Can Tho. He did so after hearing of Lê Văn Hưng's suicide.

== Conclusion ==
By 3 May 1975, North Vietnamese forces controlled all of South Vietnam, just 55 days after opening their attack on Buôn Ma Thuột.

Since the end of the war, there has been much historical recrimination and discussion as to how and why such a lopsided victory had occurred. Four main lines of thought have remained particularly viable, all of which possess some validity, but all are also open to argument.

The first argument is that the Paris Peace Accords that ended the direct American participation in the war was seriously flawed, because it permitted the North Vietnamese to maintain their forces within territorial South Vietnam after the signing of the agreement, thereby dooming the ceasefire.

The second argument is that the refusal of the United States government to take promised military action in the face of North Vietnamese violations of the ceasefire was key to the defeat. Adherents to this claim believed that South Vietnam could have been saved by another U.S. bombing campaign. The conflict between the executive and legislative branches of the American government, already severe before Operation Linebacker II in 1972, was only more exasperating during 1975, when a new campaign would probably only have provoked even more Congressional outrage.

The third cause of the defeat was that the U.S. Congress simply wrote off and abandoned the Saigon government. Richard Nixon later stated that the collapse should be laid solely at the door of a "Congress [which] refused to fulfill our obligations [and that this] tragic and irresponsible action" was to blame for losing of the war. General Viên also believed that "it was the cutback in U.S. military aid that accelerated the process and made defeat inevitable." Material shortages were indeed severe, and might explain, for example, why the Central Highlands had to be abandoned, but they do not explain the flight of senior South Vietnamese generals that led to complete collapse. Historian Arnold Isaacs, who was on the scene in South Vietnam at the time, believed that "The psychological damage of the aid cuts was almost certainly greater than the real ... Even with the full amounts requested by the executive, South Vietnam could not have done more than preserve the battlefield deadlock for another year, after which the whole exhausting debate would need to be replayed yet again – and in a presidential election year."

Other plausible reasons for the rapidity of the defeat were the American policy of Vietnamization as a prescription for defeat. The rapid and accelerating withdrawal of U.S. forces that had begun in 1969 caught the South Vietnamese unprepared. The withdrawals were simply conducted faster than the South Vietnamese could or would improve. General Hinh believed that Vietnamization did not "provide the ARVN with enough time ... While the troop increases could be achieved rapidly, it was almost impossible to improve the quality and technical capabilities ...within the span of a few years. The results of a survey of U.S. Army general officers who served in Vietnam, conducted by General Douglas Kinnard in 1974, found them agreeing with this assessment. When questioned as to the timing of Vietnamization, 73 percent of the respondents replied that the program "should have been emphasized years before." For seven years, the American military moulded South Vietnamese forces into a facsimile of itself, but ended up with a system that had all the liabilities of American military technology and few of its assets.

The South Vietnamese military had greater problems than a reduction in American aid. President Thiệu was a disaster as commander-in-chief. During the two years before the offensive (when aid cuts were already occurring), neither he nor the General Staff made adjustments in strategy, doctrine, organization, or training to compensate for the inevitability of further aid reductions. Thiệu also deprived local commanders of any strategic or tactical flexibility in decision-making, which flowed downward from the presidential palace and those decisions contributed to the defeat. Added to these problems were the long-standing corruption and incompetence within the officer corps. Early defeats during the final campaign were compounded not by a lack of will or ability on the part of the enlisted men, but by the cowardice and failing morale of the officers. According to Isaacs, "The army did not collapse in its foxholes or for lack of supplies. It disintegrated when its senior officers...deserted it."

Key to the defeat of South Vietnam was the ability of the officers and men of the PAVN. The highly motivated and newly modernized PAVN was, for the first time, freed from the restraints of previous combat doctrine. What began as a conservative strategy, devised in Hanoi, was outrun by its local successes. Battlefield commanders were then given a new flexibility, which increased the tempo of operations and allowed them to quickly apply concentrated power at strategic points. These combat successes were made possible due to improved all-arms tactical coordination, modern communications, and increased transport and logistical capability. The result was that North Vietnamese commanders achieved the ultimate goal of military leadership, the quick application of massive force leading to the defeat of the enemy at little cost in manpower. During the entire campaign, the North Vietnamese suffered few casualties. According to General Dũng: "The numbers killed and wounded was very small in proportion to the victories won, and the expenditure in terms of weapons and ammunition was negligible.

During the offensive the PAVN captured vast quantities of equipment with a value exceeding $5 billion in 1975 dollars, including: 550 tanks (250 M48 Patton, 300 M41s), 1,300+ artillery pieces (1,000 105 mm howitzers, 250 155 mm howitzers, 80 175 mm M107 self-propelled gun), 42,000 trucks, 12,000 mortars, nearly 2 million infantry weapons (including 791,000 M16 rifles, 63,000 M72 LAWs and 47,000 M79 grenade launchers), 48,000 radios, 130,000 tons of ammunition, 940 ships and 877 aircraft and helicopters (including 73 F-5s, 113 A-37s, 36 A-1s, 40 C-119s, 36 AC-47s, 430 UH-1s and 36 CH-47s).
