= Family syndrome =

Family syndrome was a term used by the United States military to describe a recurring situation in the Army of the Republic of Vietnam (ARVN) towards the end of the Vietnam War, in which ARVN soldiers confronted by the North Vietnamese military advance deserted their posts in order to rescue their families, contributing to a collapse of ARVN forces.

Following the 1968 general mobilization of the ARVN, a large number of troops had their families living in close proximity to the positions they were fighting to defend, rather than far away and safely behind the lines. Accordingly, if the enemy appeared likely to break through the ARVN defenses, it was in the interest of the individual ARVN soldier to desert to guide his family to safety, but to the great collective detriment of the ARVN defense. Family syndrome was described as a major factor in the ARVN's collapse, and the second-most common reason for desertions.

In one representative case, during the battle of Ban Me Thuot, the division commander pulled a Ranger group away from the frontlines and sent them to defend a nearby training base to protect his own family while they awaited helicopter extraction.
