= Phạm Văn Phú =

South Vietnamese general (1928–1975)

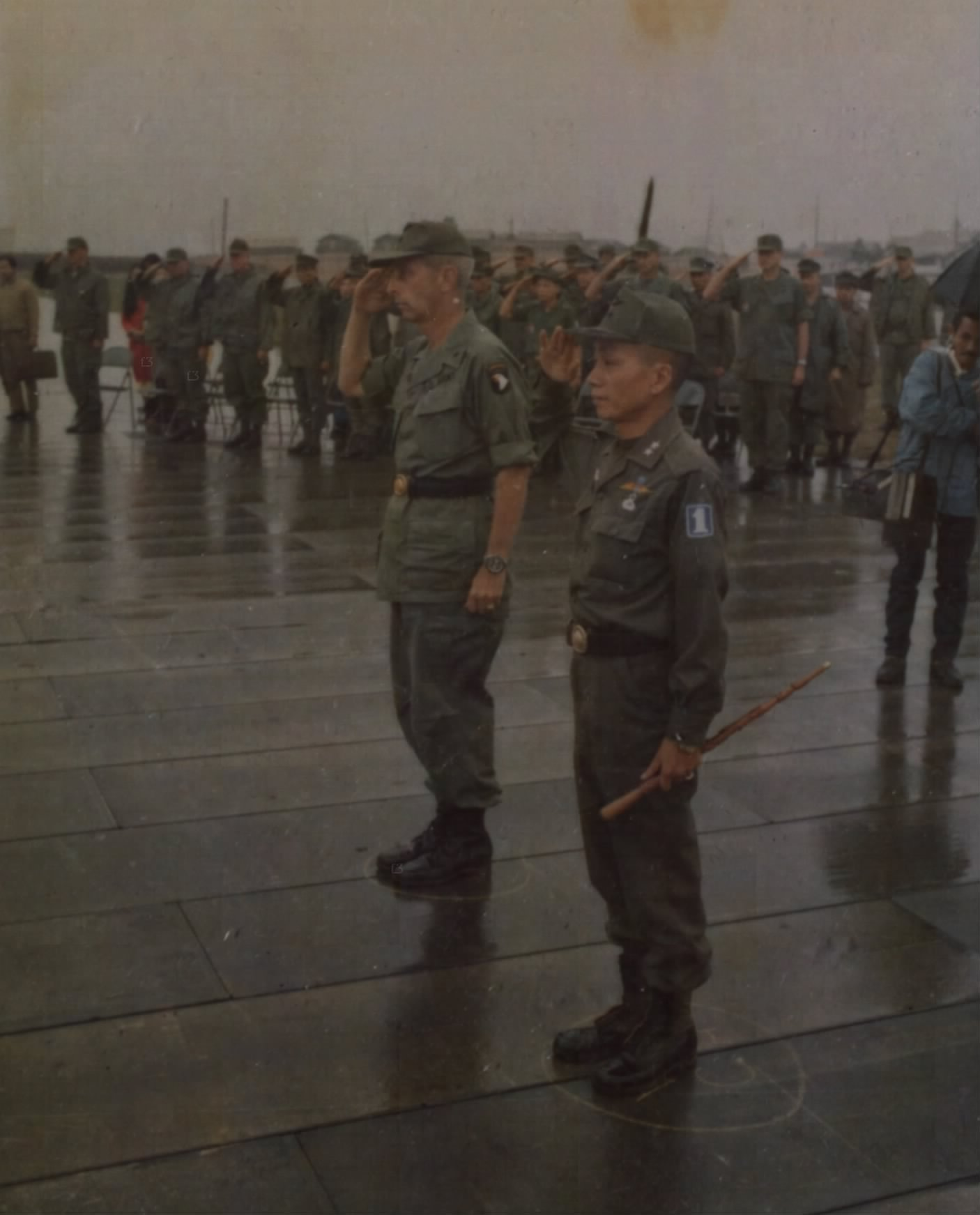
- Brigadier General John G. Hill, Jr., ADC, 101st Airborne Division and Major General Phú at Camp Eagle turnover ceremony, 1 February 1972
- Born: October 16, 1928; Hà Đông, Tonkin, French Indochina
- Died: April 30, 1975 (aged 46) Saigon, South Vietnam
- Allegiance: State of Vietnam; South Vietnam
- Branch: Vietnamese National Army; Army of the Republic of Vietnam
- Service years: 1953 – 25 October 1955 (Vietnamese National Army); 26 October 1955 – 30 April 1975 (Army of the Republic of Vietnam)
- Rank: Major general
- Commands: 1st Division; II Corps
- Conflicts: Operation Lam Son 719; Battle of Ban Me Thuot
- Awards: Croix de guerre des théâtres d'opérations extérieures (2); Gallantry Cross (South Vietnam) (17)

Major General Phạm Văn Phú (16 October 1928 – 30 April 1975) was an officer in the Army of the Republic of Vietnam.

== Military service ==
=== Vietnamese National Army ===
Phú began his military career as an interpreter for the French Army. He was then selected to attend the Dalat Military Academy, graduating in July 1953. He was appointed as a company commander in the 5th Vietnamese Parachute Battalion of the Vietnamese National Army. During the battle of Dien Bien Phu he was captured with the remainder of the French garrison when it was overrun by the Viet Minh on 7 May 1954. He was held prisoner for 16 months and contracted tuberculosis.

=== Army of the Republic of Vietnam ===
Upon his release he continued to serve with the new Army of the Republic of Vietnam (ARVN), becoming one of the first ARVN Special Forces commanders.

After serving in the Mekong Delta and then as deputy commander of the 1st Division, in August 1970 he was appointed commander of the 1st Division. He commanded the division during Operation Lam Son 719 in early 1971 and was promoted to Major general.

In an interview with The New York Times in early February 1972 he and 3rd Infantry Division commander General Vũ Văn Giai expressed doubts about the widely anticipated PAVN offensive in the northern provinces in mid-February stating that no major action would take place until March at the earliest due to the need for the PAVN to build up their logistics.

After suffering exhaustion during the 1972 Easter Offensive, he was relieved of command and hospitalized. Following his recuperation, he served as director of the Quang Trung National Training Center from early 1973.

On 5 November 1974 he assumed command of II Corps/Military Region II in Pleiku.

==== 1975 ====
He was theater commander during the Battle of Ban Me Thuot which was part of North Vietnam's Campaign 275 to capture the Central Highlands. When the initial PAVN attacks began in the Central Highlands Phú received conflicting reports on the PAVN objectives and believed that either Pleiku or Kontum were the intended targets rather than Ban Me Thuot, leading to a delayed response to the PAVN attack.

On 14 March 1975 following the loss of Ban Me Thuot, Phú flew to Cam Ranh Base for a meeting with President Nguyễn Văn Thiệu, chairman of the Joint General Staff (JGS) General Cao Văn Viên, Lt Gen. Đặng Văn Quang and Prime Minister Trần Thiện Khiêm. Thiệu outlined his concept, Phú's role would be to retake Ban Me Thuot using the troops he still had in Kontum and Pleiku Provinces and the 22nd Division from Bình Định Province. With Route 19 cut in Pleiku and Bình Định and no way to use Routes 14 and 21 through Darlac, Phú had only the rough interprovincial Route 7B available to withdraw his Kontum-Pleiku forces, assemble them in Khánh Hòa Province and then fight back up Route 21 into Ban Me Thuot. Although many hazards were discussed, this approach was accepted by Thiệu and Phú flew back to his headquarters to set the plan in motion.

On his return to Pleiku, Phú appointed the newly promoted Brigadier General Pham Duy Tat, commander of II Corps Rangers, to command the withdrawal down Route 7B. Phú then moved his command post to II Corps Rear at Nha Trang and departed with his staff. Tat however was only concerned with the safety of his Rangers and their families and responsibility for the withdrawal fell to Phú's chief of staff Colonel Le Khac Ly.

Phú hoped that surprise would make it possible to reach Tuy Hòa within three days before the PAVN could discover and react to the movement. However the poor condition of Route 7B prevented quick movement and the withdrawal of ARVN forces led to a mass exodus of civilians who soon became entangled in combat formations, impeding their movement and ability to deploy and fight. The PAVN moved to intercept the withdrawal and by 18 March was attacking the column. The vanguard of the "convoy of tears" eventually reached Tuy Hòa on 25 March. Only an estimated 20,000 of the 60,000 troops reached Tuy Hòa and they were no longer fit for combat.

On 29 March Phú issued new command responsibilities for what was left of II Corps, however the momentum of the PAVN advance was such that a defense at Cam Ranh was no longer feasible. Phú met with General Nguyễn Văn Hiếu, the deputy commander of III Corps near Phan Thiết on the morning of 2 April, Hiếu informed Phú that II Corps had been dissolved and the remaining provinces and forces would be incorporated into III Corps. On hearing this Phú attempted suicide with his pistol but was stopped by one of his officers, he was then put on a helicopter and flown to Saigon.

He committed suicide in Saigon on 30 April 1975, the day of the fall of Saigon.

== Assessments ==
In postwar interviews conducted by the RAND Corporation with senior South Vietnamese military and civilian officials on the causes of the collapse of South Vietnam, the interviewees were all highly critical of the withdrawal from the Central Highlands with one saying "it must rank as one of the worst planned and the worst executed withdrawal operations in the annals of military history." Phú was widely blamed for the disaster with interviewees saying that while he had been a "good division commander" he was "unfit" for Corps command with "poor intellectual and professional capability." Ly described him as "the type of person who acts according to his sentiment rather than his logic". One interviewee suggested that Phú failed to stay and command the withdrawal himself due to fear of being captured by the PAVN as he had at Dien Bien Phu.

== Awards and decorations ==
- South Vietnam :
  - National Order of Vietnam, Class Unknown
  - Army Distinguished Service Order, First Class
  - Gallantry Cross (17)
  - Hazardous Service Medal
  - Armed Forces Honor Medal, First Class
  - Leadership Medal, Level Unknown
  - Staff Service Medal, First Class
  - Training Service Medal, First Class
  - Civil Actions Medal, First Class
  - Vietnam Campaign Medal
  - Military Service Medal, Second Class
  - Air Service Medal, Class Unknown
  - Navy Service Medal, First Class
  - Chuong My Medal, First Class
- France :
  - Croix de guerre des théâtres d'opérations extérieures (2)
