= 968th Division (Vietnam) =

968th Infantry Division
- Allegiance: Vietnam
- Branch: People's Army of Vietnam
- Type: Infantry
- Role: Mechanized infantry
- Size: Division
- Engagements: Laotian Civil War; 1975 Spring Offensive

The 968th Infantry Division was a division of the People's Army of Vietnam, first formed in the 1960s.

== Vietnam War ==
The Division developed from PAVN's Front 968 operating in southern Laos which in mid-1970 became subordinate to Group 559.

In February 1975 in preparation for the 1975 Spring Offensive the Division marched from Laos into Gia Lai and Kon Tum Provinces, South Vietnam. This movement allowed the 10th and 320th Divisions to redeploy for the Battle of Ban Me Thuot. On 1 March the Division made a series of diversionary attacks around Pleiku, attacking to the southwest and to the north of the city cutting Route 14 in order to divert Army of Republic of Vietnam (ARVN) forces away from Ban Me Thuot. Following the ARVN defeat at Ban Me Thuot and the subsequent South Vietnamese abandonment of the Central Highlands, on 18 March the Division's 29th Regiment captured Kon Tum. The Division then moved down Route 19 attacking the ARVN 22nd Division and capturing Qui Nhơn on 1 April 1975.
