= Vũ Lăng =

Vietnamese general (1921 – 1988)

Colonel General Vũ Lăng

Personal details
- Born: Đỗ Đức Liêm; 4 August 1921 Thanh Trì, Hà Nội, French Indochina
- Died: 23 October 1988 (aged 67) Soviet Union
- Party: Communist Party of Vietnam

Military service
- Allegiance: North Vietnam (1945–1976); Vietnam (1976–1988)
- Branch/service: People's Army of Vietnam
- Years of service: 1945–1988
- Rank: Colonel General
- Battles/wars: First Indochina War; Battle of Điện Biên Phủ; Vietnam War; Battle of Ban Me Thuot; Fall of Saigon
- Awards: Hero of the People's Armed Forces

Vũ Lăng (born Đỗ Đức Liêm) (1921–1988) was a colonel-general in the People's Army of Vietnam (PAVN) active during the First Indochina War, and the Vietnam War.

In the Battle of Điện Biên Phủ, Vũ Lăng was the commander of 98th Regiment of 316th Brigade and led his regiment besieging, attacking Eliane positions (C1, C2) of French Central positions (Vietnamese: phân khu Trung tâm - Mường Thanh).

A few days after the Capture of Ban Me Thuot, on 27 March 1975, PAVN Chief of General Staff Văn Tiến Dũng held a conference with his senior officers and announced that he was authorized to continue the attack to the coast, and that three B3 Front divisions would be combined to form a new strategic army corps: the 3rd Corps. Vũ Lăng, and Đặng Vũ Hiệp would be the corps commander and commissar respectively.

In 2023, CG Vũ Lăng was posthumously awarded the Hero of the People's Armed Forces.
