= Ban Me Thuot East Airfield =

Military and civilian airfield in Vietnam

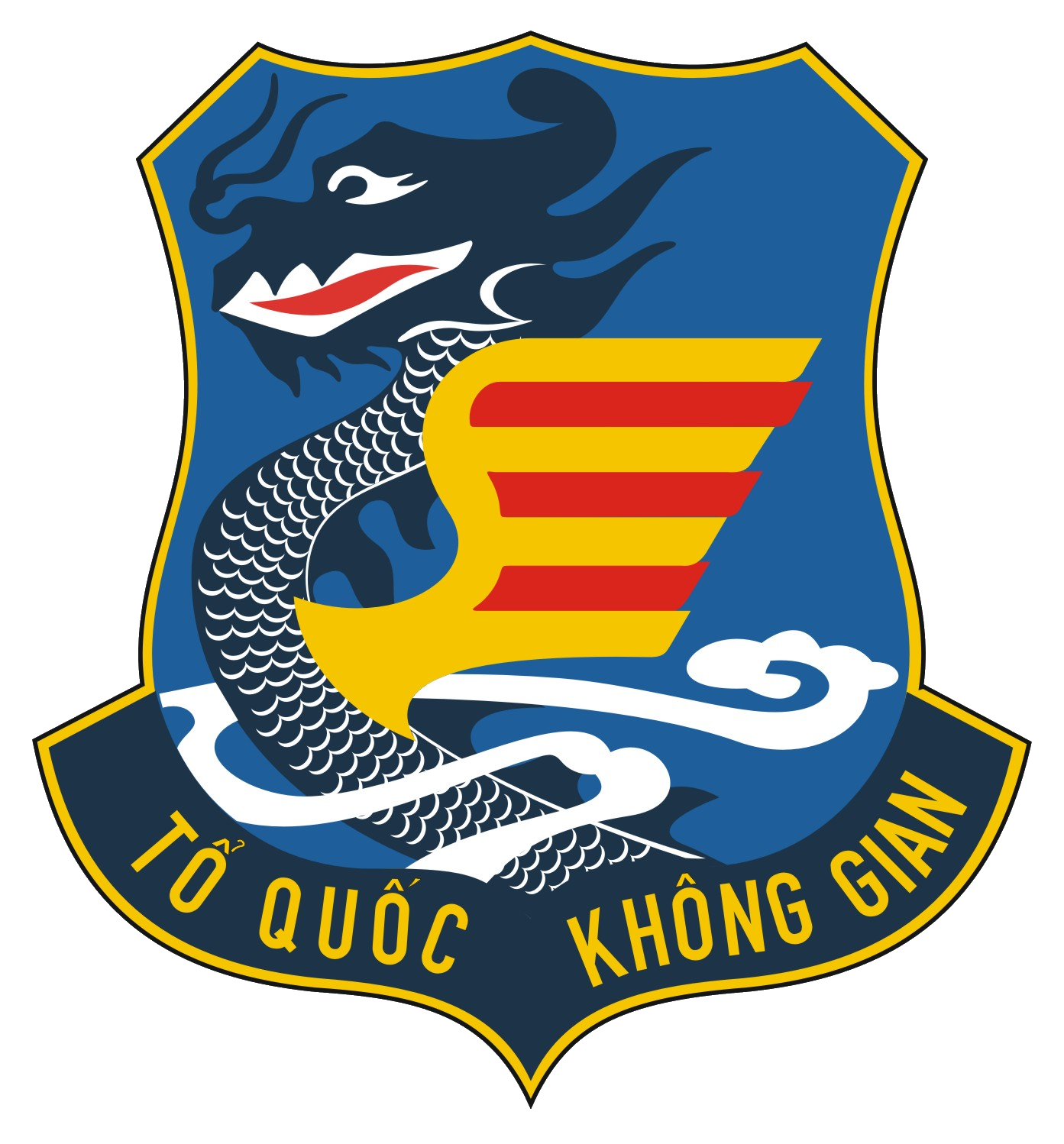
Ban Me Thuot East Airfield
- Buôn Ma Thuột, Đắk Lắk Province in Vietnam
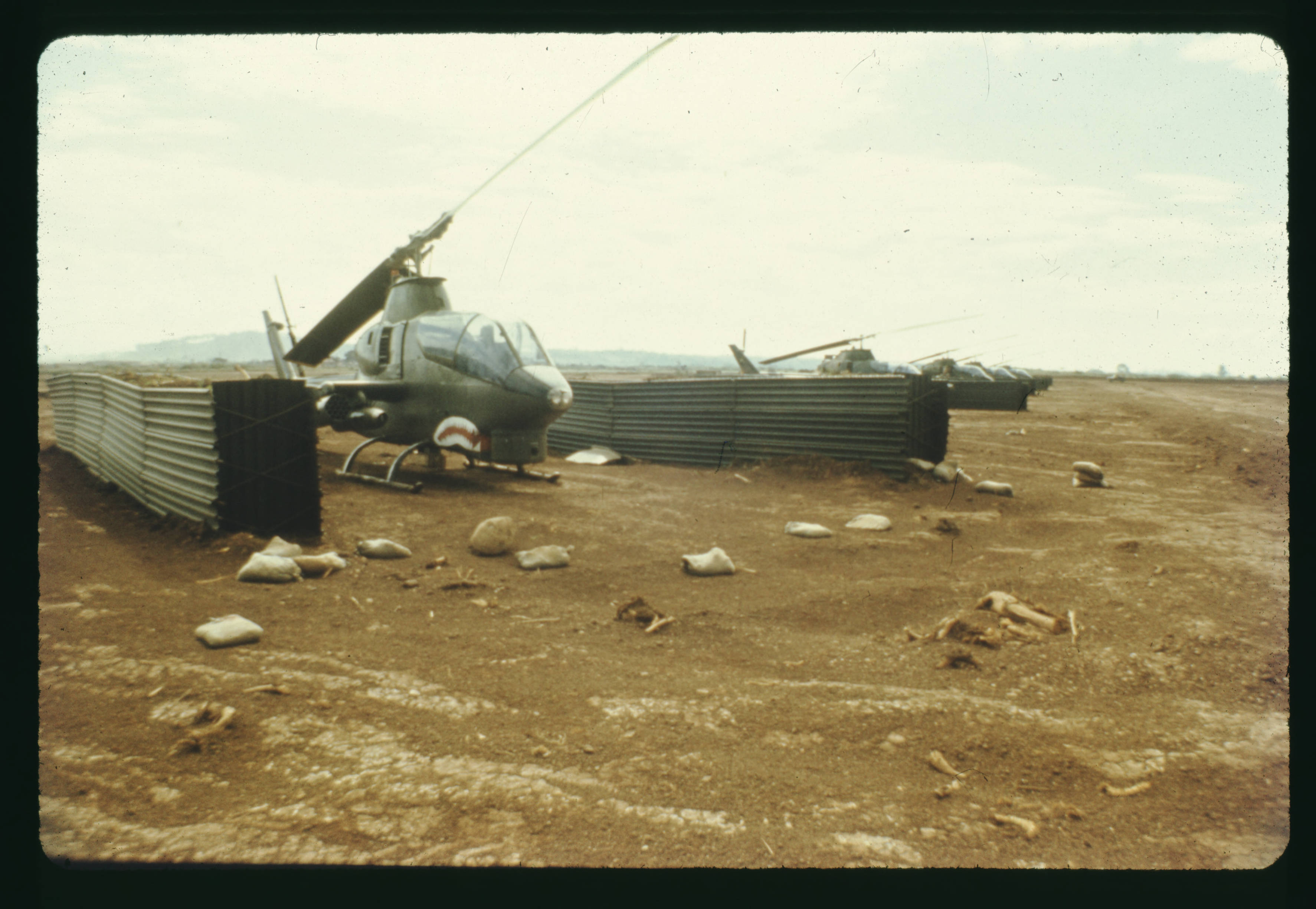
- AH-1 Cobras in revetments, 6 November 1968

Site information
- Operator: Republic of Vietnam Air Force (RVNAF); Army of the Republic of Vietnam (ARVN); Pacific Air Forces (USAF); United States Army

Location
- Shown within Vietnam
- Coordinates: 12°39′57″N 108°07′04″E

Site history
- Built: 1961
- In use: 1961-
- Battles/wars: Vietnam War; Battle of Ban Me Thuot

Airfield information
- Elevation: 1,759 feet (536 m) AMSL
Runways
Direction	Length and surface
09/27	5,900 feet (1,798 m) Asphalt

Ban Me Thuot East Airfield (also known as Ban Me Thuot FSB, Camp Torres, FSB Aquarius, Hoa Binh Airfield, LZ Ban Me Thuot and Phung Duc Airfield) was a military and civilian airfield and army base located approximately 8 km southeast of Buôn Ma Thuột, Vietnam.

== History ==
=== 1961–72 ===
The U.S. Army's 5th Special Forces Group established the first Civilian Irregular Defense Group program (CIDG) unit at the base in 1961. The base was later used by the 5th Special Forces Group Detachment 32 and then MACV-SOG Command & Control South (CCS) operated a base here later named Camp Torres.

The 20th Special Operations Squadron was based here from early 1968 to support MACV-SOG cross-border operations into Cambodia.

Firebase Ban Me Thuot was located at the southeast edge of the base. U.S. Army units located here included:

- 1st Battalion, 8th Infantry (December 1969)
- 2nd Battalion, 8th Infantry (December 1969)
- 1st Battalion, 12th Infantry (August–November 1968 1968)
- 3rd Battalion, 12th Infantry (December 1969)
- 4th Battalion, 39th Infantry (November 1967 – January 1968)
- 2nd Battalion, 17th Artillery (February 1970 – April 1971)
- 5th Battalion, 22nd Artillery (1969 – January 1970)
- A detachment of 498th Medical Company (Air Ambulance) with UH-1D Hueys from October 1965.
- 155th Aviation Company (October 1965 – March 1971)
- 185th Aviation Company (June 1967 – October 1970)

On 4 January 1968 a rocket and mortar attack on the base destroyed two UH-1s and severely damaged three others.

On 30 January 1968 as part of the Tet Offensive Viet Cong commandos attacked the base forcing its closure for several days.

=== 1975 ===
In 1975 Phung Duc Airfield was the base camp of the Army of the Republic of Vietnam (ARVN) 44th and 53rd Regiments. In the early morning of 10 March 1975 at the start of the Battle of Ban Me Thuot, the base was attacked by two People's Army of Vietnam (PAVN) sapper battalions. While the PAVN sappers quickly penetrated the 44th Regiment base area, which was defended by only rear echelon troops, they met stiff resistance in attacking the 53rd Regiment's base and by dawn had been pushed out of the base with the loss of over 100 dead. The PAVN 149th Regiment launched another attack against the 53rd Regiment's positions on 11 March, but were forced back with numerous casualties. From 12 to 13 March the ARVN 45th Regiment was dropped by helicopter onto Hill 581 1 mile (1.6 km) east of Phung Duc to begin a counterattack to retake Buôn Ma Thuột which had fallen on 12 March. At dawn on 14 March, the 149th Regiment launched another attack on the base supported by six tanks, the attack was again beaten back with the loss of one tank. A further attack was scheduled to take place during the afternoon, but some of the supporting infantry failed to arrive on time. The attack took place at sunset and the tanks became disoriented in the fading light and vulnerable to ARVN fire, by midnight the attack was called off. Simultaneously with the attack on Phung Duc the PAVN 24th Regiment supported by tanks attacked the ARVN 45th Regiment on Hill 581 scattering the 45th Regiment, killing over 200 soldiers and ending the hopes for a counterattack to retake Buôn Ma Thuột. At 03:00 on 16 March the PAVN launched an artillery barrage on the 53rd Regiment base followed by a two pronged assault 90 minutes later by the 66th and 149th Regiments supported by tanks. The PAVN were unable to breach the base's earthen walls and lost two more tanks to rockets and anti-tank defenses. PAVN engineers eventually blasted a path through the defenses and by dawn on 17 March the PAVN had finally penetrated into the base. The 53rd Regiment commander Colonel Vo An and over 100 of his men managed to escape the base and make for ARVN positions at Phuoc An.

=== Current use ===
The base is now known as the Buon Ma Thuot Airport.
