= Battle of the Mỹ Chánh Line =

Part of the Vietnam War (1972)

- Part of Easter Offensive of the Vietnam War
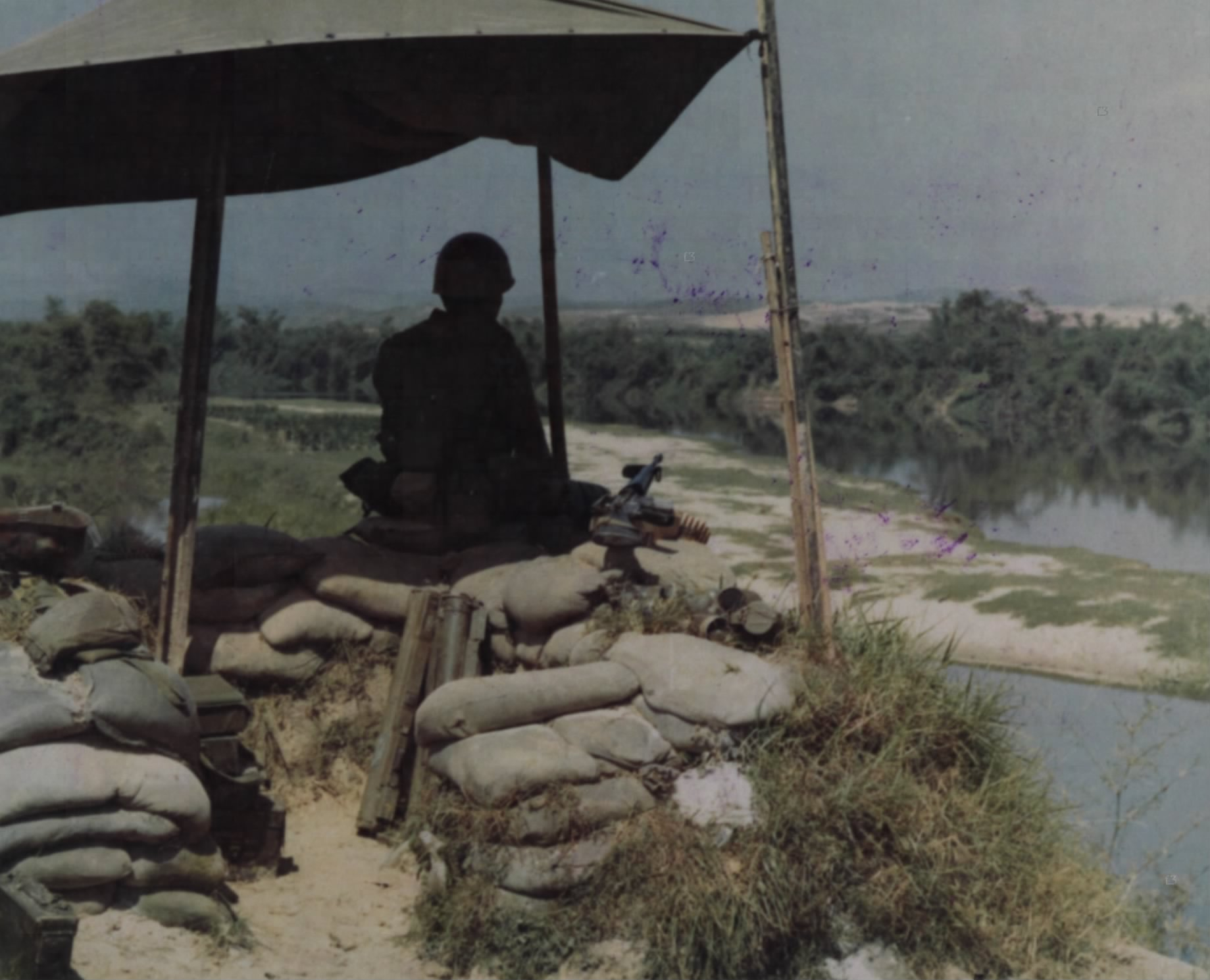
- South Vietnamese outpost on the Mỹ Chánh Line, May 1972
Date	5 May to 26 June 1972
Location	northwest of Huế, South Vietnam 16.632°N 107.303°E
Result	South Vietnamese and US victory

Belligerents
South Vietnam; United States	North Vietnam

Commanders and leaders
(South Vietnam) Ngô Quang Trưởng (United States) Frederick Kroesen; Edward J. Miller	

Units involved
(South Vietnam) Marine Division; 1st Division; Airborne Division (United States) 9th Marine Amphibious Brigade	325th Division

Casualties and losses
(South Vietnam) 764+ killed	ARVN claimed: 3,661+ killed 70+ armored vehicles destroyed

The Battle of the Mỹ Chánh Line took place from 5 May to 26 June 1972 during the People’s Army of Vietnam (PAVN)'s Easter Offensive of the Vietnam War. South Vietnamese forces, principally the Marine Division, with extensive fire and logistics support from United States forces, succeeded in stopping the PAVN advance northwest of Huế and launched a series of spoiling attacks against PAVN units. The successful defense allowed South Vietnamese forces to build up strength and then establish jumping off positions for their counteroffensive to recapture Quảng Trị Province.

== Background ==
At the end of the First Battle of Quảng Trị, Army of the Republic of Vietnam (ARVN) forces retreated south towards Huế. The Marine Division (VNMC) 369th Marine Brigade, led by Colonel Pham Van Huang, held two bridges on Highway 1 with the 9th Battalion holding the Song O-Khe bridge and the 5th Battalion holding the Song Tach Ma bridge. At dawn on 3 May the PAVN launched an artillery barrage and then attacked the Song O-Khe bridge with 18 T-54 tanks and infantry. The Marines destroyed 17 tanks and killed hundreds of PAVN before blowing up the bridge and falling back to form a defensive line northwest of Huế along the south bank of the Mỹ Chánh River.

On 4 May, the South Vietnamese Joint General Staff replaced the ineffective General Hoàng Xuân Lãm as I Corps commander with Lieutenant General Ngô Quang Trưởng. Trưởng moved his main command post to the Huế Citadel, a move that reflected a change in purpose and focus for operations in Military Region I (MR I). His immediate task was to stabilize his forces and to make effective use of available American support through 1st Regional Assistance Command (FRAC) which had replaced the United States Army's XXIV Corps. On the same date, President Nguyễn Văn Thiệu announced the appointment of Colonel Bui The Lan, as interim VNMC commander. Thiệu's order of the day was that the Mỹ Chánh Line would hold; there would be no further withdrawals.

Trưởng's available forces initially included elements of the VNMC north and northwest of Huế, the 1st Division south and southwest of Huế blocking any further PAVN advance from the A Sầu Valley and the 2nd Division in MR I's southern provinces. The remainder of the VNMC was later deployed to Huế and was given responsibility for north and northwest Thừa Thiên Province.

As the PAVN offensive halted at the Mỹ Chánh River, everything to the north was declared a free-fire zone. FRAC believed that the PAVN were capable of launching a new offensive in Thừa Thiên Province as the 304th, 308th and 324B Divisions, the 202nd and 203rd Armored Regiments and supporting units were all available for an assault. From 5 to 25 May, the PAVN probed the river-edge defenses. Losses sustained in the previous weeks did not permit full-scale offensive actions, but the PAVN's intentions were clear. Huế was the target and a major assault of the Mỹ Chánh Line was imminent.

== Battle ==
On 5 May, the Marine 258th Brigade displaced its headquarters north from Huế to Phong Điền on Highway 1 to relieve the headquarters of Marine 369th Brigade. It was a shift of headquarters only, as the respective battalions remained in place and the 39th Ranger Battalion assumed control of Camp Evans. Brigade commander Lieutenant Colonel Ngo Van Dinh concentrated his 2nd Battalion at the junction of Highway 1 and the Mỹ Chánh River in order to prevent any attempted by the PAVN to reconstruct the highway bridge that had been destroyed earlier. Dinh heavily reinforced his western flank as he anticipated the all-out attack on Huế to originate in the nearby foothills. The area to the west, due to thick canopy and rolling hills, was well concealed from aerial observation. The Marines of the 258th Brigade were thinly spread over a large area, but Dinh was confident. He kept his units moving, effectively employing the principle of economy of force by concentrating his forces only as PAVN threats developed.

The 369th Brigade assumed operational control of the eastern half of the division's area of the Mỹ Chánh Line, including the Regional and Popular Force units responsible for the area near the coast. This drastically reduced the 369th Brigade's area of responsibility and the Mỹ Chánh Line was stronger than ever. The 147th Brigade remained at Huế with the 4th and 8th Battalions, replacing personnel and making up supply losses sustained in the First Battle of Quảng Trị. Replacement equipment came directly from United States Marine Corps (USMC) stocks. New antitank weapons arrived to augment the Marine capabilities to defeat armor on the ground.

Trưởng arranged for the Direct Air Support Center at Da Nang Air Base to move forward to Huế and a fire support coordination center (FSCC) was colocated to coordinate artillery, naval and air support. Trưởng established priority targets for air support as: 1. 130mm guns: 2. tanks; 3. smaller artillery; and 4. trucks. In addition U.S. air power spent the first week of May destroying abandoned equipment along Highway 1 and at Firebase Nancy and destroying 45 bridges north of Mỹ Chánh. The 130 mm guns proved especially difficult as they were well deployed, making it difficult for the observers to get a fix on firing positions. Due to the SA-7 antiaircraft missile threat, airborne Forward Air Controllers (FACs), forced to fly above 9,500 feet (2,900 m), could not readily spot enemy gun flashes. The PAVN guns had no more than two platoons (two to four guns) in any one position. These were spread all over the northwest portion of Quảng Trị Province. As FACs flew over suspected PAVN gun positions, the guns would cease firing and another platoon would open up from a different sector, linked by an efficient communications network.

After having overrun Firebase Bastogne and Firebase Checkmate at the end of April, on 5 May the PAVN 324B Division attempted to continue their advance down Route 547 towards Huế and in two clashes 2 miles (3.2 km) west and southwest of Firebase Birmingham, 39 PAVN and two ARVN were killed.

On 8 May the 2nd Airborne Brigade arrived at Huế and came under the operational control of the VNMC. With increasing forces available, Trưởng planned a series of limited objective attacks and raids to provide the South Vietnamese time to prepare for their counteroffensive and keep the PAVN off balance. The South Vietnamese gave the code name Song Than (Tidal Wave) to these operations. The first operation named Song Than 5-72 was to be a helicopter raid against PAVN positions in the Hải Lăng District southeast of Quảng Trị.

=== Operation Song Than 5-72 ===
During darkness on 12 May, the 369th Brigade's reconnaissance company, the communications officer of the 9th Battalion and a small group of other Marines swam the Mỹ Chánh River to establish a communications site to assist command and control of the operation the next morning. CH-46s and CH-53s from HMM-164, part of the USMC 9th Marine Amphibious Brigade (9th MAB) operating off the coast of South Vietnam, then lifted 1,138 Marines into attack positions. To move the two battalions, 60 marines were carried by each CH-53 and 20 by each CH-46 in two sequential waves. HMM-164 planned to provide the maximum possible lift capability in each wave and to reduce possible losses, the helicopter assault routes were flown Nap-of-the-earth contrary to then-current practice. The CH-46s were to be 30 feet (9.1 m) to 40 feet (12 m) above ground and the CH-53s only slightly higher. Six AH-1G Cobras, two OH-6As and a UH-1 of the Army's Troop F, 4th Cavalry (Air Cavalry) flying from Phu Bai Combat Base provided armed escort. A single wave of helicopters was used for each of two landing zones, reducing the exposure time to PAVN antiaircraft fire. The helicopters proceeded to Fire Base Sally to load the 3rd and 8th Battalions, 369th Brigade.

The two landing zones received devastating fire from the air and sea. As a result, touchdown in Landing Zone Tango (16.707°N 107.268°E) occurred at 09:30 without opposition in a cloud of dust and smoke. The Marine helicopters returned to the ships for fuel then flew back to Firebase Sally for the second wave at 10:55. As the lead aircraft touched down in Landing Zone Delta moderate small-arms fire was received. Immediately, the Army commander of the escorting gunships shifted the landing to the southern portion of the zone. The PAVN hit three CH-46s and Marine airmen left one CH-53 in the zone with a damaged tail rotor which had to be destroyed to prevent its capture.

Once on the ground, the two battalions swept south and attacked toward the Mỹ Chánh River. Shortly thereafter, the 9th Battalion crossed the Mỹ Chánh and attacked north toward its two sister battalions. The PAVN 66th Regiment was caught completely by surprise. As the two battalions marched south to link up with the 9th Battalion, they uncovered large quantities of combat equipment and freed more than 150 civilians who had been detained by the PAVN. The joint efforts resulted in reports of 240 PAVN soldiers killed, three tanks destroyed and two 130 mm guns put out of action.

On 14 May approximately 4,000 ARVN 1st Division troops supported by artillery and B-52 strikes advanced west from Firebase Birmingham along Route 547 coming to within 0.5 miles (0.80 km) of Firebase Bastogne and killed 110 PAVN.

=== PAVN attack 21–2 May ===
On 21 May the PAVN mounted a full-scale armor and infantry attack on the Mỹ Chánh Line in an attempt to regain the initiative. The PAVN attacked due south down the coastal highway, Route 555, (16.706°N 107.36°E) moved across the Mỹ Chánh River and penetrated the 369th Brigade's defensive area. The Regional Force troops fell back, exposing the flanks of the 3rd and 9th Battalions. Vulnerable to the overwhelming armor threat, both battalions withdrew. After an all-day fight, however, the two battalions, assisted by close air strikes and ARVN armored cavalry, began pushing the PAVN back towards the Mỹ Chánh River. The Marines had suffered heavy casualties but by nightfall had largely restored the line.

The PAVN remained determined to gain a foothold on the south bank of the river. At 01:00 on 22 May, the PAVN launched a tank-infantry attack against the 3rd Battalion. They had the initiative and the numerically superior force, supported by 25 tanks, overran the forward battalion, but not before the Marines had destroyed eight tanks with M72 LAWs and direct fire from 105mm howitzers. Continuing their attack through the early morning darkness, the PAVN penetrated deeply into South Vietnamese territory, hitting the 369th Brigade's command post at first light. A U.S. Army sergeant fired the BGM-71 TOW missile system from atop the command and control center bunker destroying a PT-76 and then a heavy machine gun nest. Five PAVN armored vehicles came within 400 meters of the command post before being destroyed. By 09:30, a total of 10 tanks and armored personnel carriers had been destroyed. As the 8th Battalion counterattacked, the PAVN fled the battlefield, leaving their dead and wounded.

=== Operation Song Than 6-72 ===
On 23 May, the 7th Battalion and its advisors moved by truck to Tân Mỹ Base where it boarded landing craft for the short trip to the ships of the U.S. amphibious force: the USS Schenectady, USS Manitowoc, USS Cayuga and USS Duluth in preparation for Operation Song Than 6-72 an amphibious assault at Wunder Beach 10 km north of the Mỹ Chánh Line and a heliborne assault 6 km inland. The operation was coordinated onboard USS Blue Ridge by the 147th Brigade and 9th MAB staff.

The landing began the next morning, 24 May, with artillery, air, and naval gunfire strikes on Wunder Beach and Landing Zone Columbus (16.744°N 107.304°E) near Quảng Trị at the road junction of Routes 555 and 602. Lifting off the USS Okinawa at 07:50, the helicopters of HMM-164 headed towards Tân Mỹ to pick up the Marine assault troops. Loading some 550 marines from the 4th and 6th Battalions, the helicopters took off for their objective. The assault ships launched 20 LVTP-5 amphibian tractors, with USMC crews and VNMC assault troops, from a release point 3,600 yards (3,300 m) off Wunder Beach. The LVTPs formed into two waves, as they closed within 2,000 yards (1,800 m) of Red Beach a final B-52 strike placed a string of bombs down the length of the beach, raising a curtain of fire and sand. The LVTPs hit the beach at 08:32 and were met by scattered PAVN infantry and artillery fire.

As the Marines consolidated and moved off the beach behind continuing air support and naval gunfire, the USMC amphibian tractors returned to the ships. It was the first combat experience for 90% of the Americans involved. While launching the surface assault, the Duluth and the Cayuga were fired upon by a PAVN artillery battery. The destroyer USS Hanson and other gunfire support ships returned fire and silenced the PAVN battery. Initial reports from the landing force indicated that the 7th Battalion had secured its immediate objectives, killing at least 50 PAVN troops in the process. As they quickly moved over the sand dunes to the south, the Marines encountered only token resistance from the surprised enemy. Later field messages reported large amounts of weapons, ammunition and food caches captured.

At 09:40, 18 CH-46 and CH-53 helicopters from HMM-164 lifted elements of the 4th and 6th Battalions into Landing Zone Columbus. Artillery smoke was laid west of LZ Columbus to screen the helicopter movement from enemy artillery fire and the Army air-cavalry division gunships marked the zone with suppressive fires. No enemy fire was encountered by the helicopters as the Marines unloaded. Soon after landing, however, both battalions made heavy contact with elements of the 18th Regiment, 325th Division. Two PAVN soldiers captured by the Marines stated that their regiment had just arrived in the area in preparation for an attack on the Mỹ Chánh Line.

All the battalions of 147th Brigade returned to the Mỹ Chánh Line, terminating the second offensive action by the VNMC. In addition to the two prisoners of war, 369 PAVN were claimed killed, three tanks were destroyed and more than 1,000 civilians were freed from PAVN control.

=== PAVN attack 25 May ===
As air observers and FACs uncovered road and trail networks or spotted troop movements and vehicles, they would report them to the Marine defenders along the Mỹ Chánh Line. As trails, supply points, and troop sightings were plotted and connected, a pattern soon developed showing lines of communication mainly from the Ba Long Valley towards Camp Evans. With the arrival of the 325th Division in Quảng Trị Province, the PAVN had three divisions with which to attack the Mỹ Chánh Line.

At 05:30 on 25 May, a numerically superior PAVN tank-infantry force hit the 258th Brigade in the western portion of the Marine division's large area of responsibility. The regimental-size enemy force made a stubborn attempt to break through the Mỹ Chánh Line. Although armor was employed in unprecedented numbers, the PAVN committed its infantry prematurely, exposing it to heavy supporting arms fire.

Early on the morning of 26 May, a reinforced PAVN battalion launched an attack against the 258th Brigade's western flank. One element of the PAVN force made the 9th Battalion pull back more than 1,000 meters to consolidate. Heavy air strikes and naval gunfire was directed onto the attackers, who finally broke contact, leaving their dead where they had fallen. The 1st Battalion was also heavily hit by the attack. Two PAVN battalions from the 88th Regiment, supported by tanks, mortars, recoilless rifles and artillery fire, threatened to overrun the 1st Battalion's position. Air strikes were directed on the attackers inflicting many casualties. As the PAVN withdrew they left more than 200 dead on the battlefield. Throughout May along the Mỹ Chánh Line the PAVN had suffered more than 2,900 soldiers killed, 1,080 weapons captured and 64 armored vehicles destroyed or captured.

On 31 May President Thiệu promoted Marine Division commander Colonel Bui The Lan to Brigadier General at the Imperial City, Huế. The entire Airborne Division arrived in late May and was given responsibility for a sector between the Marine Division and the 1st Division. The Marine Division then assumed control of the 1st Ranger Group which had just arrived from Da Nang.

=== Operation Song Than 8-72 ===
On 8 June the Marines launched a spoiling attack named Song Than 8-72. All three brigades were committed in a four-battalion attack across the river. The Marines moved forward under the cover of a closely coordinated fire support plan which included B-52 strikes, tactical air, artillery and naval gunfire. The American-established FSCC at division headquarters permitted supporting arms to be fired in concert, a technique heretofore fraught with problems of execution.

As the battalions crossed the Mỹ Chánh River, the heaviest resistance was encountered along the coastal areas, particularly along Route 555. The PAVN was well entrenched, but Marine casualties were comparatively light with nine men killed in action. The PAVN took heavy losses, with the operation accounting for 230 PAVN killed, seven tanks destroyed and 102 weapons, including several SA-7 missiles captured or destroyed. At the conclusion of the operation the Marines were north of the Mỹ Chánh River, once again in Quảng Trị Province and anxious to continue north.

In order to consolidate the Marines' captured territory, ARVN engineers built pontoon bridges across the Mỹ Chánh River to give tanks, artillery, and trucks access to Quảng Trị Province. Plans were already being made to send the Marine brigades back into the offensive. Such plans culminated in Operation Song Than 8A-72.

=== Operation Song Than 8A-72 ===
Beginning on 18 June Operation Song Than 8A-72 again involved all three VNMC brigades. 147th Brigade struck north along Route 555, into the notorious Street Without Joy coastal area. 369th Brigade held the center position as it attacked across open rice paddies, flanked to the west by 258th Brigade, moving along Highway 1. The PAVN forces were defending in depth along Highway 1 and Route 555, reinforced by armor, artillery and antiaircraft units. Stream and canal networks between the two roads were interlaced with trenches and fortified positions. Further to the west lay rolling hills and the PAVN's 130 mm guns.

On the night of 20 June a reinforced PAVN infantry battalion supported by tanks and artillery hit the 6th Battalion, 147th Brigade's night defensive position on Route 555. The tanks were not coordinated with the infantry maneuver and Marine artillery quickly responded to each tank sighting with massed fire. Despite this, at least 40 PAVN soldiers were able to break through the 6th Battalion's perimeter and attack the battalion command post, fragmenting the command group. For the next eight hours the battle raged. Both tactical aircraft and naval gunfire supported the battalion as Lieutenant Colonel Do Huu Tung rallied his battered Marines for a tank and infantry counterattack. Backed by B-52 strikes and other supporting arms, the 6th Battalion pushed the PAVN out. The PAVN responded with heavy artillery and mortar fire throughout the entire zone of action. While the 6th Battalion was fighting for its survival, the 1st and 5th Battalions also repulsed large armored counterattacks.

By 27 June, the Marines had successfully established a new defensive line 4 km north of the Mỹ Chánh River. The operation had resulted in 761 PAVN killed, eight tanks destroyed and freed hundreds of captive villagers.

=== PAVN attacks 22–4 June ===
On 22 June the PAVN attacked ARVN Airborne positions 4 miles (6.4 km) southwest of Mỹ Chánh, but the attack was repulsed by the ARVN supported by B-52 strikes. Sixteen tanks were destroyed and 146 PAVN killed for the loss of one ARVN. On 23 June the PAVN mounted another attack west of Huế which was repulsed with 13 tanks destroyed and 98 PAVN killed for the loss of five ARVN killed. On 24 June starting at 01:00 with a barrage from 130 mm guns, the PAVN launched another assault on the line which was repulsed, with 22 tanks knocked out and more than 100 PAVN killed by the South Vietnamese Marines. Seven tanks were destroyed by U.S. fighter-bombers while eight were destroyed by U.S. helicopter gunships with BGM-71 TOW anti-armor missiles.

== Aftermath ==
The probing attacks in June tested PAVN strength and allowed for the establishment of advance positions ahead of the launch of Trưởng's Operation Lam Son 72 to recapture Quảng Trị Province. The operational plan called for the Airborne and Marine Divisions to advance abreast to the northwest to the Thạch Hãn River. The Airborne Division would deploy to the west from the foothills to Highway 1, while the Marine Division would deploy to the east from Highway 1 to the coast. Quảng Trị City would be in the Airborne Division's operational area, but the plan called for the city to be bypassed so as to concentrate on the destruction of PAVN forces. As a diversion the 9th MAB would conduct a feint amphibious assault against the mouth of the Cua Viet River.

Massive airpower had been brought to bear in MR I. Throughout April, May and June more than 18,000 sorties by tactical aircraft had been flown, 45% by the USAF, 30% by the USMC and Navy and 25% by the Republic of Vietnam Air Force. In addition over 2,700 B-52 sorties had dropped 57,000 tons of bombs.

The official PAVN history records the battle as follows:

This was a great opportunity, but, because we lacked a reserve force and because we had not prepared roads and supplied beforehand, our troops were not able to take advantage of this opportunity to exploit our victory and liberate Thừa Thiên-Huế...The enemy focussed on consolidating his defensive line along the Mỹ Chánh River and used this line as a base to strike out to the east and west to disrupt our preparations to attack Huế...Our troops experienced many difficulties in maintaining supply levels and we were able to provide only 30 percent of the supplies called for in our plan. In addition, because we had been slow to change our campaign tactics as the enemy strengthened his forces and solidified his defense, our assault against the Mỹ Chánh defensive line from 20 to 26 June was unsuccessful...In late June 1972 the fighting on the Trị-Thiên Front became very complex, with fierce back-and-forth fighting between our troops and the enemy.
