= 4th Marine Battalion (South Vietnam) =

- Active: 1961–1975
- Allegiance: South Vietnam
- Branch: Republic of Vietnam Marine Division
- Type: Marines
- Role: Amphibious warfare Anti-tank warfare Artillery observer Close combat Counterinsurgency; Force protection Jungle warfare Raiding; Reconnaissance; Urban warfare
- Size: Battalion
- Garrison/HQ: Hoang Hoa Tram camp
- Nickname: "Killer Sharks"
- Engagements: Vietnam War: Battle of Binh Gia

Commanders
- Battalion Commander: Captain Bui The Lan
- Vice Battalion Commander: Captain Nguyen Van Nho
- Captain of 1st Company: Lieutenant Nguyen Thanh Tri
- Captain of 2nd Company: Lieutenant Tran Van Hoán
- Captain of 3rd Company: Lieutenant Nhat
- Captain of 4th Company: Lieutenant Ton

The 4th Marine Battalion was an infantry marines battalion falling under command the 147th Marine Brigade during the Vietnam War. The battalion was formed in early 1961 and based at Vũng Tàu in Phước Tuy province (now Bà Rịa–Vũng Tàu province). On 30–31 December 1964, it was ambushed by elements of the Viet Cong 9th Division near the Quang Giao rubber plantation, 4 kilometres (2.5 mi) south east of Bình Giã and suffered 60% casualties. The battalion ceased to exist after the Fall of Saigon on 30 April 1975 and the collapse of the South Vietnamese government.
