= Battle of Ba Gia =

1965 battle of the Vietnam War

- Part of the Vietnam War
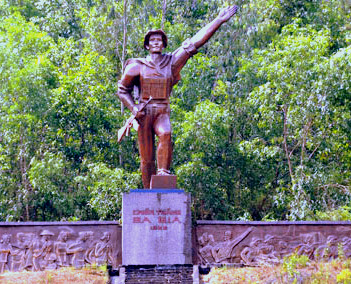
- The Ba Gia victory monument in Quảng Ngãi Province.
Date	28–31 May 1965
Location	15.173°N 108.667°E Ba Gia, Quảng Ngãi Province, South Vietnam
Result	Viet Cong victory

Belligerents
South Vietnam	Viet Cong

Commanders and leaders
(South Vietnam) Nguyễn Chánh Thi (South Vietnam) Nguyễn Thọ Lập	Chu Huy Mân; Lê Hữu Trữ

Units involved
(South Vietnam) I Corps: 51st Infantry Regiment; Two Artillery Battalions; (South Vietnam) RVNN Marines: 3rd Marine Battalion; (South Vietnam) ARVN Rangers: 37th Ranger Battalion; 39th Ranger Battalion	1st Infantry Regiment 45th Independent Battalion Quảng Ngãi Province Command: 48th Local Force Bn.; 83rd Local Force Bn.

Strength
2,500	2,000

Casualties and losses
107 killed 367 captured or missing VC claim: 1,350 killed or wounded 360 captured 467 surrender 18 helicopters destroyed 14 trucks destroyed 370 weapons captured (28-31 May)	84 killed 24 weapons recovered

The Battle of Ba Gia was a major battle that marked the beginning of the Viet Cong's (VC) Summer Offensive of 1965, during the early phases of the Vietnam War. The battle took place in Quảng Ngãi Province, South Vietnam, between 28 and 31 May 1965.

Following the victory of VC forces in the Battle of Bình Giã earlier in the year, the North Vietnamese leadership in Hanoi decided to intensify their war effort in order to defeat the American-backed Government of South Vietnam. The North Vietnamese war effort received a major boost in the first half of 1965, when the Soviet Union and the People's Republic of China stepped up the delivery of military aid, which included the deployment of military specialists and other personnel to train North Vietnam's armed forces. The North Vietnamese decision to intensify the war culminated in the Summer Offensive of 1965, which aimed to destroy the regular divisions of the Army of the Republic of Vietnam (ARVN) in large-scale battles, and pin down the elite units of the ARVN strategic reserve. In Quảng Ngãi Province, South Vietnam, the VC kick-started their summer campaign by attacking elements of the ARVN 51st Infantry Regiment during the early hours of 29 May 1965. In the days that followed, the VC destroyed an entire ARVN Task Force to mark a successful start to their summer campaign.

== Background ==
During the first half of 1965, the war in South Vietnam sharply escalated. In January 1965, while on a visit to China, a North Vietnamese military delegation met with Chinese Prime Minister Zhou Enlai to discuss the situation. In the meeting the North Vietnamese were advised by Zhou Enlai to step up military operations in South Vietnam, in order to destroy the ARVN whenever they came out to fight.

In April, the Soviet Union's political support for North Vietnam materialised with the delivery of MiG fighter planes and SA-2 anti-aircraft missiles, along with large quantities of food and ammunition. In addition, Soviet pilots and other specialists were dispatched to North Vietnam to train North Vietnamese military personnel in the use of advanced military hardware. China, not to be outdone by its Soviet rival, increased the delivery of armaments to North Vietnam at rates which surpassed their commitments in 1964. China also offered logistical assistance to the North Vietnamese military by providing seven divisions of Chinese soldiers for road construction and other projects. The logistical support offered by China had a significant impact on the North Vietnamese military, as North Vietnam needed all its combat divisions to conduct operations, to aide the Pathet Lao in Laos and the VC in South Vietnam.

Buoyed by the recent victory in the Battle of Bình Giã and the support of their major allies, North Vietnamese leaders began preparing a strategy to defeat South Vietnamese and United States military forces. Lê Duẩn, Secretary of the Communist Party, believed that the South Vietnamese regime was able to survive because they still had a strong army to rely upon. Therefore, to win the war and reunite the country, the South Vietnamese military had to be destroyed completely. Lê Duẩn believed the Communist forces must destroy three or four of South Vietnam's nine regular army divisions in a series of large battles, and pin down the eleven elite battalions of the South Vietnamese strategic reserve. Thus, North Vietnamese leaders decided to launch a summer offensive with the objective of defeating the ARVN by drawing them into battle repeatedly with numerous, geographically dispersed attacks.

== Prelude ==
At the beginning of the summer season in 1965, VC Commanders in Military Region 5 passed a resolution to launch a military operation known as the "Lê Độ Campaign", which was supposed to last from 15 May to 30 August 1965. The operation was aimed at ARVN military units based in the provinces of Gia Lai, Kon Tum and Quảng Ngãi. Preparations for a major military offensive was made at the beginning of 1965 when Trần Kiên, Chairman of the VC Rear Services in Military Region 5, began the process of transporting soldiers and materiel into the VC areas of operation. Huỳnh Hữu Anh, Deputy Chief of the VC Chief of Staff in Military Region 5, was responsible for conducting reconnaissance missions and air defence. PAVN Major general Chu Huy Mân was sent to South Vietnam to take command of military operations.

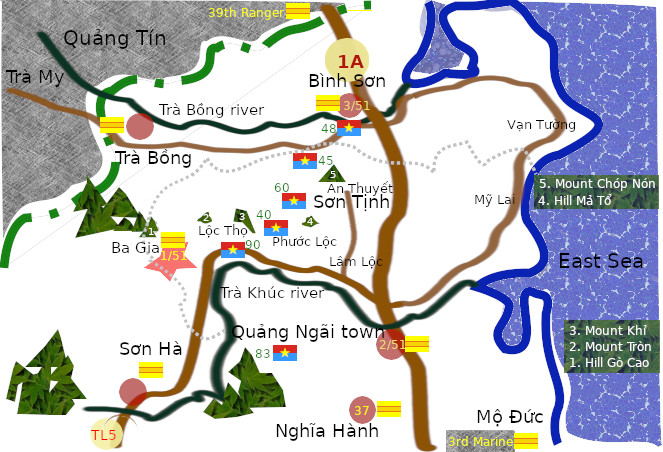
Battle of Ba Gia Territory map in the first day, with military units distribution

The VC decided to launch a major assault on South Vietnamese units in Ba Gia, a small village in Sơn Tịnh District about 10 km from Quảng Ngãi town.

In May 1965, the VC 1st Regiment (part of the Viet Cong 2nd Division) moved into northern Quảng Ngãi from the neighbouring Quảng Nam province. The VC 1st Regiment had three battalions (the 40th, 60th and 90th Battalions), and was placed under the command of Lê Hữu Trữ. In northern Quảng Ngãi, the 1st Regiment joined the 45th Independent Battalion and the 48th Local Force Battalion. In southern Quảng Ngãi, it joined the 83rd Local Force Battalion. On the other side, South Vietnamese military units in Quảng Ngãi formed part of the ARVN 1st Brigade, I Corps, commanded by Major general Nguyễn Chánh Thi. In Quảng Ngãi the main ARVN force included the 51st Infantry Regiment, 3rd Marine Battalions, the 37th and 39th Ranger Battalion, and two artillery battalions equipped with 105mm artillery guns.

== Battle ==
On the night of 28 May 1965, the VC marched into their designated positions around Ba Gia; the 90th Battalion took up their position at Minh Thành, the 60th Battalion at Vĩnh Lộc, the 40th Battalion at Duyên Phước, and the 45th Battalion at Vĩnh Khánh. The 1st Regimental Headquarters set up camp at Mount Hốc Khoai, while the 83rd Local Force Battalion was ordered to encircle the administrative centre at Nghĩa Hành.

At 05:45 on 29 May, elements of the VC 1st Regiment launched a surprise attack on Lộc Thọ, a small village located south of Ba Gia. Within 10 minutes of fighting, the two platoons of South Vietnamese Regional Force defending Lộc Thọ were subdued, and the VC quickly consolidated the battlefield around the area. At around 06:00 ARVN Captain Nguyễn Văn Ngọc, commander of the 1st Battalion, 51st Infantry, led his unit from Gò Cao south toward Phước Lộc to stage a counterattack against the lead element of the VC 1st Regiment.

At 09:50, as the ARVN 1st Battalion marched through Lộc Thọ village they were encircled by the VC 90th Battalion, who had set up ambush positions in Mount Khỉ and were waiting for the ARVN to arrive. Caught by surprise, the ARVN 1st Battalion descended into chaos and was unable to mount an effective counter-attack. In less than one hour of fighting, the battalion was completely destroyed with 270 soldiers either killed or wounded. Ngọc was amongst the 217 men who were captured. Only 65 ARVN soldiers and three American advisors managed to return to government lines. The VC also claimed to have destroyed one 105mm artillery piece, four GMC trucks and one Jeep. Meanwhile, the VC 83rd Local Force Battalion marched from Trà Khúc River toward Nghĩa Hành District, and began applying pressure on the ARVN stationed there. Thus, the VC were asserting control over Ba Gia and the surrounding areas.

On the afternoon of 29 May, Thi responded to the VC assault by forming a Task Force with the objective of recapturing Ba Gia. The Task Force consisted of the 2nd Battalion, 51st Infantry, the 3rd Marine Battalion, the 39th Ranger Battalion and one squadron of M113 armored personnel carriers. According to Thi's plan, the Task Force would achieve the following objectives: the 3rd Marine Battalion would advance along Route 5 toward the objective of Ba Gia; the 39th Ranger Battalion through An Thuyết, Vĩnh Lộc and Vĩnh Khánh and then capture Mount Chóp Nón; and the 2nd Battalion, 51st Infantry towards Phước Lộc and capture Mount Mả Tổ. On the morning of 30 May the South Vietnamese Task Force assembled in Quảng Ngãi town and waited for further orders, while ARVN artillery and U.S. Air Force fighter-bombers pounded VC positions around Ba Gia.

At around midday on 30 May, with extensive air support from U.S. fighter-bombers and UH-1 helicopter gunships, the ARVN advanced towards their objectives in two separate columns. In the first, the ARVN 39th Ranger Battalion approached northern Phước Lộc to secure Mount Chóp Nón, from where they could strike at the VC's southern flank. In the second column the ARVN 2nd Battalion and the 3rd Marine Battalion advanced towards their objectives of Mount Mả Tổ and Ba Gia respectively. However, South Vietnamese manoeuvres on the ground did not go unnoticed, because VC reconnaissance teams on Mount Khỉ had spotted the columns and responded accordingly. Elements of the VC 45th Battalion were ordered to set up ambush positions inside the village of Vĩnh Khánh, while the 60th Battalion was redeployed to Mount Mả Tổ and waited for the enemy there. At about 13:00 the ARVN 2nd Battalion, 51st Infantry arrived on Hill 47 in the vicinity of Mount Mả Tổ, but the VC 60th Battalion allowed them to advance toward their objective.

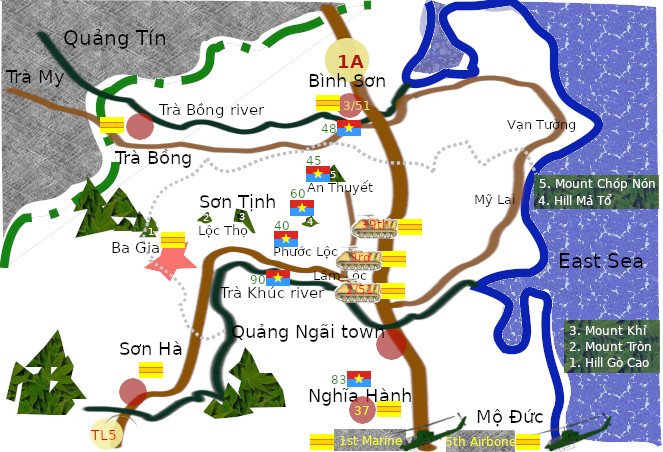
Battle of Ba Gia in the last day, with preparing reinforcement from Saigon

Meanwhile, the ARVN 39th Ranger Battalion secured their objective on Mount Chóp Nón, with the main formation of the VC 45th Battalion lining their troops on the rear positions of the ARVN Rangers. At 14:00, VC artillery began bombarding the 39th Ranger's position and also targeted the task force’s artillery at Ba Gia to make it difficult for the howitzers to support the rangers. Allied fighter-bombers responded quickly, but were unable to strike because the airborne Forward air controller could not locate the battle. Meanwhile, the fighting between the rangers and the VC 45th Battalion became fierce, swinging back and forth over the course of the day.

As the pressure on the rangers grew, the task force commander ordered the 2nd Battalion, 51st Infantry, to move north from Phước Lộc to help. The 3rd Marine Battalion would advance to occupy the village in place of the infantry. The 2nd Battalion responded slowly, with the result that both battalions were still in and around Phước Lộc when the VC attacked at 16:00. Again, the fighting was ferocious. The VC 40th Battalion overran one infantry platoon and forced the rest of the 2nd Battalion to consolidate on a hill west of town. The VC 60th Battalion drove the 3rd Marine Battalion out of the village, with the marines taking shelter in a moat on the north side of the town. Allied airpower helped prevent the VC from overrunning these positions and ultimately facilitated the withdrawal of the 2nd Battalion, 51st Infantry, and the M113 troop.

Nightfall found the marines holding the moat for a length of about 400 meters. During the night, the VC launched numerous probes and three major assaults against them. In each case, the marines held their fire to the last minute, then shifted their position within the moat after each attack. Their tactics succeeded, but the 39th Ranger Battalion on Mount Chóp Nón was not as fortunate. Overnight, the VC ravaged the battalion except for one company that survived. By dawn on 31 May, the VC had begun to withdraw.

== Aftermath ==
The battle at Ba Gia, which marked the beginning of the VC's Summer Offensive of 1965, had dealt a severe blow to South Vietnam's armed forces. For the first time in the VC's history, their forces at Ba Gia successfully decimated a regimental-sized ARVN Task Force in battle. According to Vietnam's official account of the battle, the VC killed or wounded 915 South Vietnamese soldiers, and 270 others were captured. The VC also captured 370 weapons of various kinds and destroyed 14 GMC trucks. South Vietnamese losses were 107 killed, 123 wounded, and 367 captured or missing, they also lost 384 individual and 10 crew-served weapons. The VC left behind 84 bodies and 24 weapons. MACV estimated that the VC may have suffered as many as 826 casualties.

Following their victory, the VC Quảng Ngãi Province Provincial Committee initiated a political campaign to exercise political influence over the province. By 3 June 1965, the VC virtually controlled five districts in northern Quảng Ngãi Province (Bình Sơn, Sơn Tịnh, Nghĩa Hành, Tư Nghĩa and Mộ Đức), home to 10,000 civilians.

Even though the fighting at Ba Gia was minor in scale, it convinced President Lyndon B. Johnson that South Vietnam's armed forces could not deal with the growing Communist forces by themselves. On 20 July 1965, U.S. Secretary of Defence Robert McNamara laid out three options before Johnson concerning the American involvement in Vietnam: 1) withdraw all American personnel from Vietnam to minimise their losses; 2) continue American commitments at their then approximate level of about 75,000 men; 3) substantially expand the American military presence in Vietnam. Ultimately, Johnson chose the third option and decided to 'Americanise' the Vietnam War, and by 22 July the U.S. military was authorised to raise its combat strength in Vietnam to 44 battalions. Thus, total U.S. military presence in Vietnam grew from 75,000 to 125,000 men, drawn mainly from the U.S. Army and the U.S. Marine Corps. Undeterred by this growing U.S. military strength, North Vietnamese leaders decided to match American commitments by increasing the number of their troops in South Vietnam, thereby escalating the war.

On 5 July 1965 the VC again attacked Ba Gia. Before dawn they wheeled 75mm howitzers up to the post's perimeter. The guns blasted the fort as several battalions swept over the parapet. The VC quickly overran the garrison — an infantry battalion, a scout company, and a 105mm platoon before allied air power could arrive. ARVN losses were 21 dead, 88 missing and 224 infantry weapons and two howitzers lost. The ARVN chose not to reopen the post.

== Legacy ==
In May 2000, the Veterans Affairs Committee of Ba Gia regiment coordinated with the Veterans Association of Quảng Ngãi province to release the memoir "Ba Gia Victory - recall and reflect".
