= Republic of Vietnam Marine Division =

Infantry component of the Republic of Vietnam Navy

Republic of Vietnam Marine Division Sư Đoàn Thủy Quân Lục Chiến
- RVNMD shoulder sleeve insignia
- Founded: 1954
- Disbanded: 30 April 1975
- Country: South Vietnam
- Type: Marines
- Role: Amphibious warfare Expeditionary warfare
- Size: 20,000
- Part of: Republic of Vietnam Navy
- Nicknames: "Sea Tigers" (Vietnamese: Cọp Biển) “Tsunami” (Vietnamese: Sóng Thần)
- Motto: Mạnh như sóng thần (English: Strong as a Tsunami)
- Engagements: Vietnam War; Battle of Binh Gia; Battle of Ba Gia; Operation Coronado IX; Operation Kien Giang 9-1; Tet Offensive; Battle of Hue; Operation Quyet Thang; Easter Offensive; Battle of the Paracel Islands; 1975 Spring Offensive

Commanders
- Notable commanders: Le Nguyen Khang; Bui The Lan

Insignia
- Flag

The Republic of Vietnam Marine Division (RVNMD, Vietnamese: Sư Đoàn Thủy Quân Lục Chiến or TQLC; French: Division de Marines de la république du Viêt Nam) was part of the armed forces of South Vietnam. It was established by Ngo Dinh Diem in 1954 when he was Prime Minister of the State of Vietnam, which became the Republic of Vietnam in 1955. The longest-serving commander was Lieutenant General Le Nguyen Khang. In 1969, the VNMC had a strength of 9,300, 15,000 by 1973, and 20,000 by 1975.

The Marine Division traced their origins to the Corps des Marines vietnamien founded in 1955 as French-trained Commandos Marine divisions recruited and placed under the command of the French Navy but officially incorporated in 1960. From 1970 onwards, the South Vietnamese Marines and Airborne Division grew significantly, supplanting the independent, Central Highlands based Vietnamese Rangers as the most popular elite units for volunteers. Along with the Airborne, the Marine Division formed the General Reserve with the strategic transformation under Vietnamization, with elite and highly-mobile units meant to be deployed in People's Army of Vietnam attacking points and incursions. By then, the level of training had improved considerably and U.S. Army General Creighton Abrams who oversaw Vietnamization stated that South Vietnam's Airborne and Marines had no comparable units to match them in the PAVN.

This division had earned a total of 9 U.S. presidential citations, with the 2nd Battalion "Crazy Buffaloes" earning two.

== History ==
The Vietnamese Marine Corps had its origins during French rule of Indochina. The 1949 Franco-Vietnamese Agreement stated that the Vietnamese Armed Forces were to include naval forces whose organization and training would be provided by the French Navy.

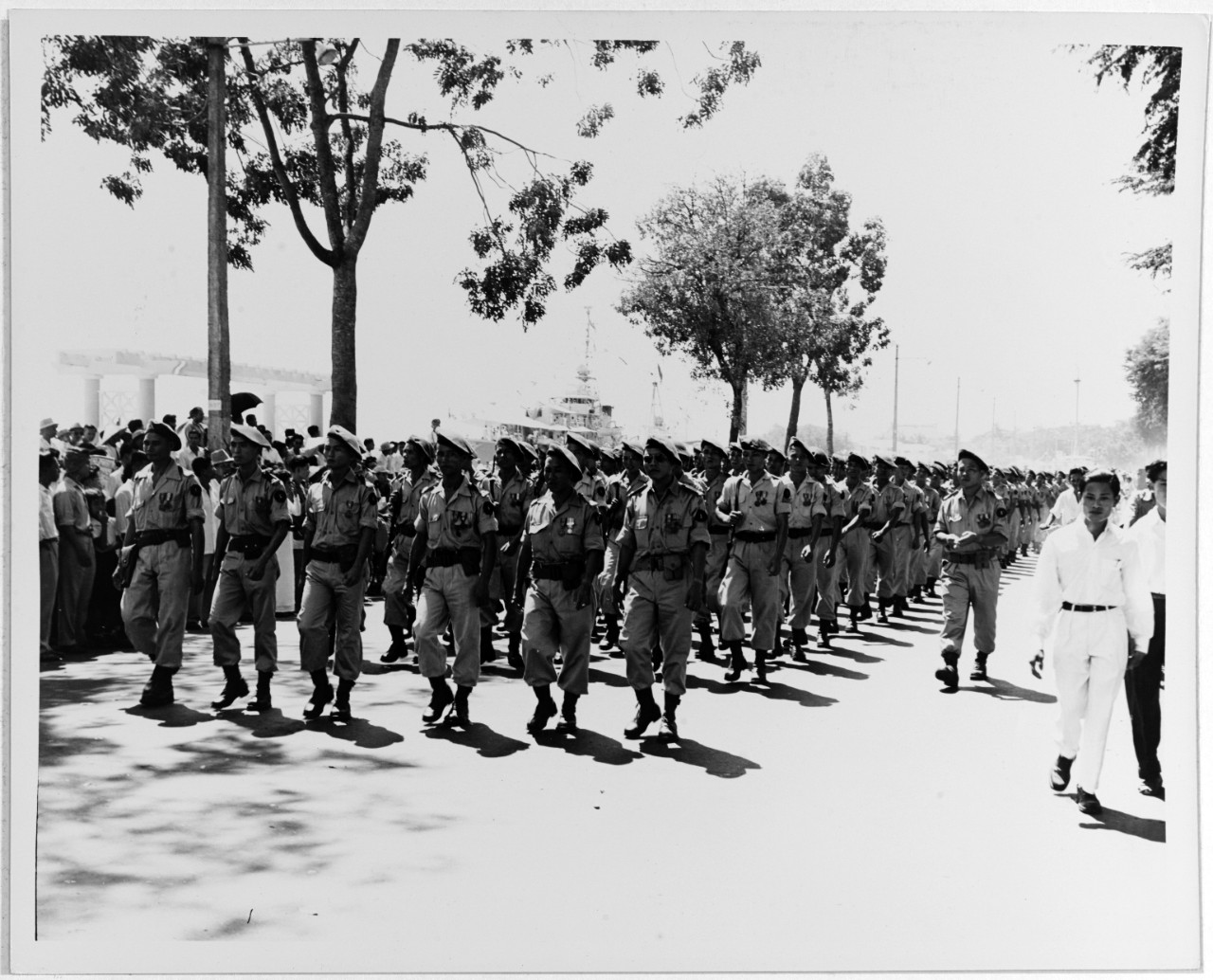
First Marine battalion marches through Saigon, October 1956

In March 1952, the Navy of Vietnam was established. In 1953, the French and Vietnamese governments agreed to increase the size of Vietnamese National Army, so an increase in the size of the Vietnamese Navy was also deemed necessary. As they debated whether the Army or Navy would control the river flotillas, French Vice Admiral Philippe Auboyneau proposed for the first time the organisation of a Vietnamese Marine Corps. When the French withdrew from Vietnam in 1954, the Vietnamese Marine Corps was a component of the Vietnamese Navy. The Marine Corps consisted of a headquarters, four river companies, and one battalion landing force. On 13 October 1954, Prime Minister Ngo Dinh Diem signed a government decree formally creating within the naval establishment a section of infantry, then of brigade strength, later to be designated as the Marine Corps (VNMC).

Organization of the Republic of Vietnam Marine Division

During late December 1964 in the Battle of Binh Gia the 4th Marine Battalion suffered 60% casualties as it attempted to rescue a trapped Ranger force.

=== 1965 ===
On 7 April in a five-hour battle, the Vietcong (VC) prevented an engineer company that was advancing north from Hoài Nhơn from linking up with a marine company garrisoning An Thai on Highway 1. As the battle unfolded, the marines reinforced An Thai with two additional companies and a battalion headquarters. The fighting only ended when howitzers and US Army UH–1B gunships suppressed the VC at 16:00. At midnight on 7/8 April, the VC attacked An Thai and were repulsed by the Marines in repeated attacks lasting until 05:00 when they succeeded in penetrating the western perimeter, and slowly pushed the marines back from one house or foxhole to another. At dawn the marine commander launched a counterattack using troops from the relatively quiet southeastern perimeter. The rest of the battalion joined in, and, by 07:00, the VC were in retreat. The VC attacked once more at 04:00 on 9 April. This time, they came from the south, using two companies backed by mortars probably to cover the withdrawal of the rest of their force. Marine losses were five dead, 36 wounded, and 20 missing. The VC lost 231 dead, 12 captured and six machine guns, a mortar, and 105 individual weapons. Half the prisoners were recently infiltrated Northerners. The other half were Southerners, who claimed that they had received just 15 days of training.

On 18 April the ARVN 2nd Division massed six battalions and six platoons of artillery backed by aircraft to target the headquarters of the VC 1st Regiment, four infantry battalions, and an artillery company in the Viet An area of Quang Tin province. Two columns moved southwest from Thang Binh district town into the hilly piedmont. The southern axis met stiff and mounting resistance by an estimated two battalions deployed on three hills. After a series of airstrikes, a company from the 3rd Marine Battalion made a lodgment on one of the hills while the rest of the battalion and two troops of M113 armored personnel carriers swept around the VC southern flank and hit the main position on a second knoll. Considerable amounts of bloody clothing found near the combat hamlet of Thanh Yen supported villager reports that the airstrikes had killed about 150 VC. The ARVN spent the night on the battlefield. On the following afternoon an observation aircraft reported seeing VC moving further west toward the hamlet of Chien Son. After a brief artillery bombardment, the 3rd Marine Battalion and the two cavalry troops advanced in line across a field toward the hamlet. At 17:25, the VC unleashed a bombardment including heavy 4.2 inch mortars. Surprised by the large explosions the M113s turned about and drove off the battlefield, causing the marines to panic and flee. Friendly artillery stopped firing, and the USAF forward air controller on the scene was unable to persuade two Republic of Vietnam Air Force (RVNAF) A-1s on station to attack. The Marine officers and their advisers could not stop the rout, but they did manage to steer the mob toward an abandoned VC trench where the marines stopped to take shelter. Here, allied officers organized a defense. The respite was brief as VC troops adjusted their bombardment to hit the new position, and a large column maneuvered to attack. Four advisers fell wounded, and, despite the best efforts of the remaining officers and advisers, the marines broke again. The division headquarters again rejected calls for artillery support on the supposition that the VC was too close to the marines, but the commander of the 2nd Division, General Hoàng Xuân Lãm, ordered a ranger battalion and an infantry battalion to come to their aid. That plan backfired when the panic that infected the marines spread to the new battalions, which quickly joined the rout. The debacle cost the allies 26 dead, 86 wounded, 28 missing, and eight crew-served and 25 individual weapons lost. The allies counted 53 VC dead and estimated they had killed 297 more, but MACV considered the latter number highly speculative.

On 27 May I Corps mounted its largest airmobile operation to date as US Marine Corps helicopters, escorted by US Army gunships, delivered two battalions to pin two VC companies against a river, 40km south of Da Nang. The VC broke across open country to escape the trap, which allowed the gunships to hit them with rockets and machine guns. After arriving at its objective, the 3rd Marine Battalion reversed course and ran into enemy soldiers who had been trailing the unit. Flushed into the open, these insurgents fell victim to Army UH–1B gunships. By the time the operation ended, the allies had killed 93 VC and captured 30 and nine weapons. ARVN losses amounted to two dead and three wounded.

On 30 May in the Battle of Ba Gia the 3rd Marine Battalion was part of a task force with 2nd Battalion, 51st Infantry Regiment, 25th Division, the 39th Ranger Battalion and one squadron of M113s to recapture Ba Gia which had been captured the previous day by the VC. The VC first attacked the 2nd Battalion, 51st Infantry and then ambushed the 3rd Marine Battalion as it attempted to support the 2/51st forcing both units to retreat to Phuoc Loc. On the morning of 31 May the VC renewed their attacks capturing Phuoc Loc and attacking the 39th Rangers inflicting heavy casualties. Total South Vietnamese losses were 392 men killed and missing.

From 7 to 10 September the 3rd Marine Battalion participated in Operation Piranha on the Batangan Peninsula with US Marine forces.

=== 1966–1967 ===
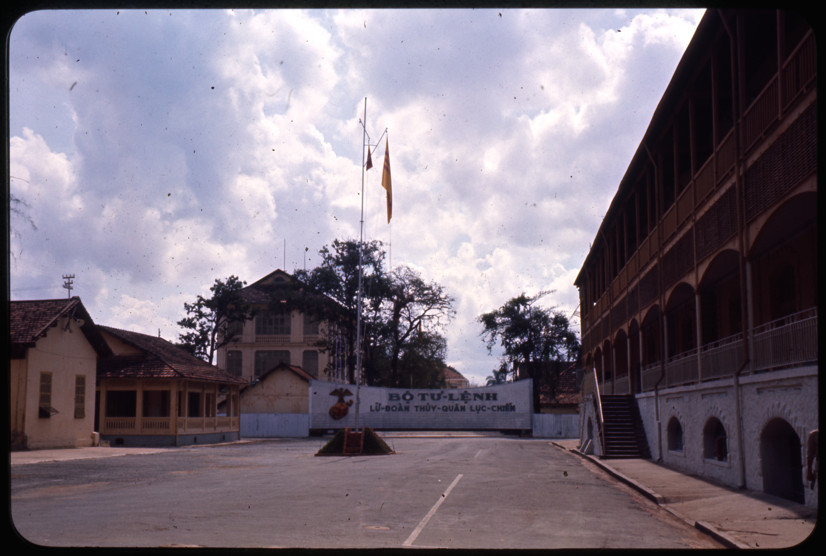
Vietnamese Marine Corps Headquarters, Saigon, March 1966

From 6–22 August 1966 three Marine Battalions participated in Operation Colorado/Lien Ket 52 with the ARVN 2nd and 4th Battalions, 2nd Division and elements of the US 1st Marine Division against the People's Army of Vietnam (PAVN) 2nd Division in the Hiệp Đức District.

From 6–15 January 1967 the 3rd and 4th Marine Battalions participated in Operation Deckhouse Five with the 1st Battalion, 9th Marines in Kiến Hòa Province.

From 27 to 31 July 1967 the 3rd Marine Battalion participated in Operation Coronado II with the 44th Ranger Battalion and the US Mobile Riverine Force (MRF) against VC units in the Mekong Delta.

From 15 to 19 November 1967 the 5th Marine Battalion participated in Operation Kien Giang 9-1 with the ARVN 7th and 9th Divisions and the MRF against the VC 263rd Battalion's Base Area 470 in western Định Tường Province. The operation rendered the 263rd Battalion combat ineffective.

On 4 December 1967 while participating in Operation Coronado IX with the MRF, a flotilla of ATCs carrying the 5th Marine Battalion came under fire 12 km east of Mỹ Tho from the VC 502nd Local Force Battalion in a fortified base on the west bank of the Rach Ruong Canal. The VC attacked the boats with rockets and automatic weapons and the Marines were landed north of the VC position and proceeded to overrun the position killing over 100 VC and scattering the rest. Shortly afterward the US 3rd Battalion, 47th Infantry Regiment landed south of the VC. The fighting was intense and the 4/47th Infantry was landed by helicopter west of the VC position. To the south the 3/47th Infantry, encountered resistance from scattered VC bunkers that prevented it from linking with the Marines. There were 266 VC killed in total, mostly by Marines. The Marines lost 40 killed and 107 wounded, while the Americans suffered 9 dead and 89 wounded.

=== 1968 ===
During the Tet Offensive attack on Joint General Staff Compound the 2nd Marine Battalion, together with the 6th Airborne Battalion and elements of the 8th Airborne Battalion, fought the VC 2nd Go Mon Battalion attacking the compound.

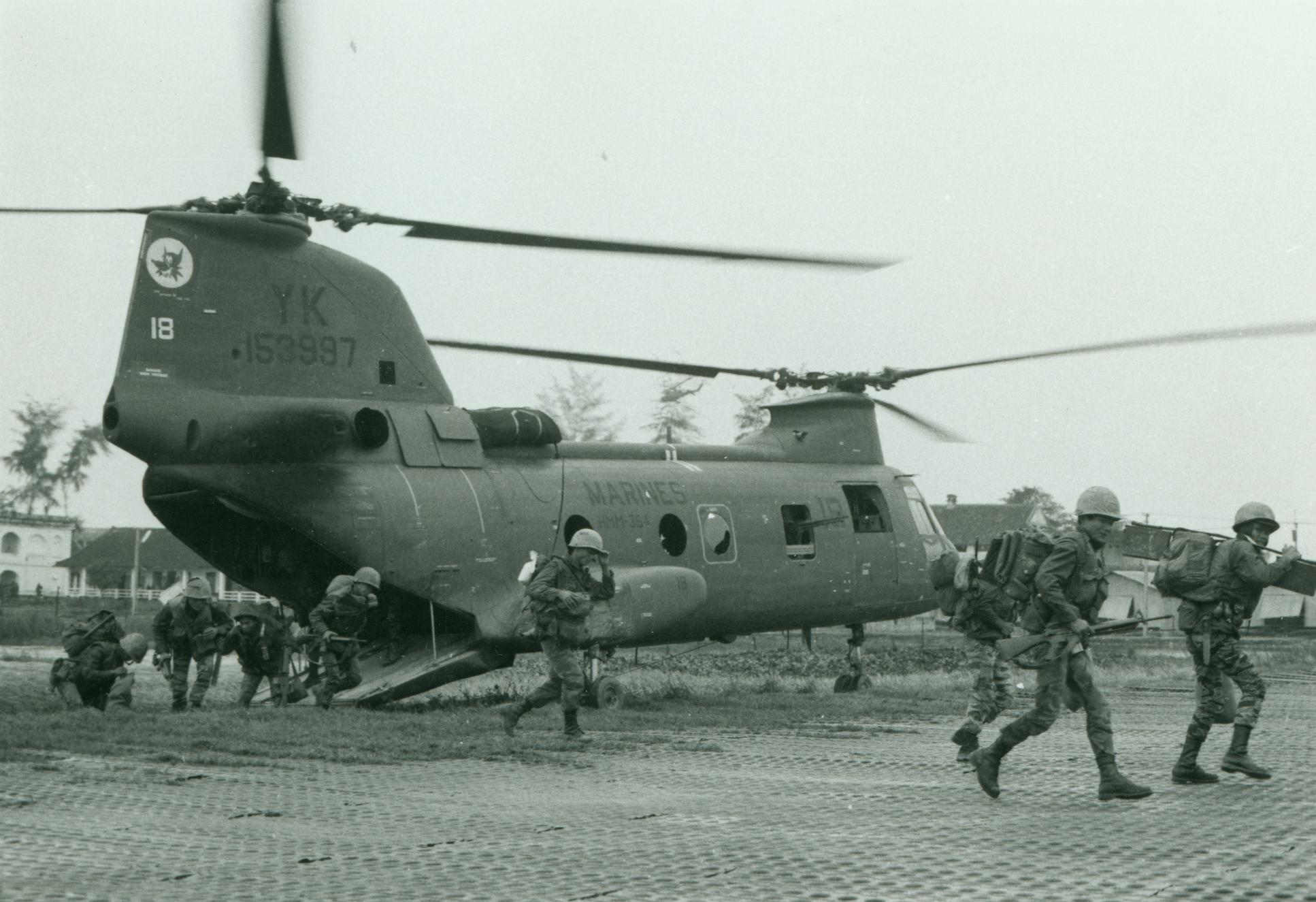
A U.S. CH-46 from MAG-36 drops off South Vietnamese marines into Hue on 23 February 1968

On 11 February 1968 during the Battle of Hue the Vietnamese Marines Task Force A comprising the 1st and 5th Battalions, began to be lifted by helicopter into Mang Ca Garrison, headquarters of the 1st Division in the northeast corner of the Citadel of Huế to replace the 1st Airborne Task Force. However, due to poor weather this deployment would not be completed until 13 February. On 14 February Marine Task Force A joined the battle. The operational plan was for the Marines to move west from Tây Lộc Airfield and then turn south, however they were soon stopped by strong PAVN defenses; after two days the Marines had only advanced 400 metres. On 17 February the Marines and 3rd Regiment resumed their attacks south, while the 1st Division's Black Panther Company was moved to support the right flank of the US 1st Battalion, 5th Marines, over the next 3 days these forces would slowly reduce the PAVN's perimeter. On 22 February after a barrage of 122mm rockets the PAVN counterattacked the Marines who pushed them back with the support of the Black Panther Company. 23 February saw little progress prompting deputy COMUSMACV General Creighton Abrams to suggest that the Vietnamese Marine Corps should be dissolved. On the night of 23 February the PAVN attempted another counterattack but were forced back by artillery fire and the 3rd Regiment launched a night attack along the southern wall of the Citadel, at 05:00 they raised the South Vietnamese flag on the Citadel flag tower and proceeded to secure the southern wall by 10:25. The 2nd Battalion, 3rd Regiment and the Black Panther Company recaptured the Imperial City against minimal resistance by late afternoon. The last remaining pocket of PAVN at the southwest corner of the Citadel was eliminated in an attack by the 4th Marine Battalion in the early hours of 25 February.

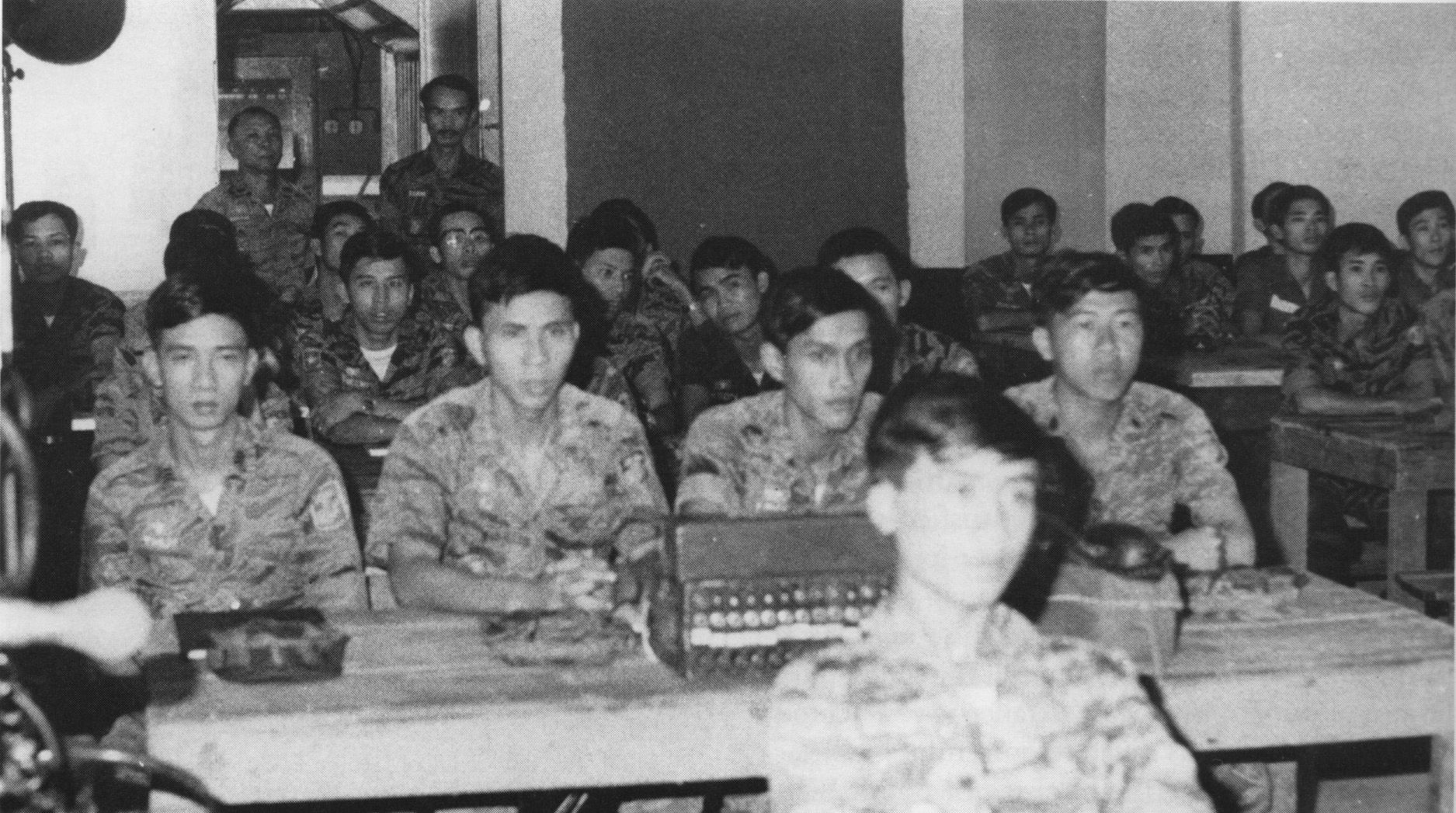
South Vietnamese marines during training at Song Than base camp

From 11 March to 7 April the Marine Brigade participated in Operation Quyet Thang in Gia Định Province with the Airborne Division and the US 199th Light Infantry Brigade to reestablish South Vietnamese control over the areas immediately around Saigon in the aftermath of the Tet Offensive.

After midnight on 20 September during the Phase III Offensive, the VC 1st Battalion, 272nd Regiment, attacked a Regional Forces outpost in Phước Tân hamlet, 20 km west of Tay Ninh City, losing 35 killed in the brief assault. The 1st Marine Battalion was deployed to Phước Tân later that day to defend against any renewed assault. That evening the 271st Regiment attacked, the assault was repelled with air and artillery support, killing 128 VC with 6 captured. The 8th Airborne Battalion was also deployed to Phước Tân and on the night of 27 September the 272nd Regiment attacked again losing 150 killed.

=== 1969–1971 ===
On 15 January 1969 the 1st Marine Battalion joined Operation Goodwood with the 1st Australian Task Force replacing the 2nd Airborne Brigade. On 20 January they were replaced by Headquarters ARVN 52nd Regiment augmented by the ARVN 3/52nd Regiment and the 5th Marine Battalion.

During Operation Lam Son 719 on 21 March 1971 the Marines at Fire Support Base Delta, south of Route 9 in Laos, came under intense ground and artillery attacks. During an attempted extraction of the force, seven helicopters were shot down and another 50 were damaged, ending the evacuation attempt. The Marines finally broke out of the encirclement and marched to the safety of FSB Hotel, which was then hastily abandoned. Following the conclusion of the operation the Marines were kept in I Corps instead of returning to their base in Saigon, presumably to prevent them spreading stories of the losses suffered in the operation. A US adviser who observed the Marines before and after the operation said that "These were brave men, well led, well supplied who had a certain elan and a certain confidence in themselves when they went in. When they came out, they'd been whipped. They knew they'd been whipped and they acted like they'd been whipped."

=== 1972 ===
In early 1972 two Marine brigades of the general reserve were stationed in Quảng Trị Province under the operational control of the recently formed 3rd Division. The 147th Marine Brigade was headquartered at Mai Loc Camp and the 258th Brigade was at Firebase Nancy. The Marines and 56th Regiment, 3rd Division presented a strong west-facing defense as this was assumed to be the most likely direction of attack. The offensive began at noon on 30 March 1972, when an intense artillery barrage rained down on the northernmost ARVN outposts just south of the DMZ.

On 30 March the 258th Marine Brigade was deployed forward to Đông Hà. Early on the morning of 1 April under pressure from the PAVN the 4th Marine Battalion abandoned Firebase Sarge and retreated to Mai Loc Camp. By 1 April the PAVN had broken through the ARVN defensive positions along the DMZ and north of the Cam Lo River and fragmented ARVN units and terrified civilians began withdrawing to Đông Hà. 3rd Division commander General Vũ Văn Giai, ordered a withdrawal of the Division south of the Cửa Việt River in order for his troops to reorganize a new defensive line. Extending the line south the 147th Marine Brigade would hold Mai Loc and secure the high ground along Route 9 between Cam Lộ and Mai Loc.

By 11:00 on 2 April the ARVN 20th Tank Battalion moved forward to Đông Hà to support the 258th Marine Brigade in and around the town and defend the crucial road and rail bridges across the Cua Viet River. Marine ANGLICO units called in naval gunfire to hit PAVN forces near the bridges on the north bank of the river and destroyed 4 PT-76 amphibious tanks east of Đông Hà. More tanks were hit by an RVNAF A-1 Skyraider before it was shot down. At midday PAVN tanks attempted to force the road bridge, but six tanks were destroyed by fire from the ARVN 20th Tank's M48s. At approximately 13:00 Captain John Ripley, an adviser to the Marines, swung under the road bridge and spent three hours installing demolition charges to destroy the bridge. The bridge was blown up at 16:30 and the damaged railway bridge was destroyed around the same time temporarily halting the PAVN advance. Naval gunfire and a B-52 strike were soon directed at PAVN forces gathered on the northern bank.

On 2 April, after several days of shelling and surrounded by a PAVN regiment, Colonel Pham Van Dinh, commander of the 56th Regiment, surrendered Camp Carroll and his 1,500 troops with barely a shot being fired. With the loss of Camp Carroll the 147th Marine Brigade abandoned Mai Loc, the last western base and fell back to Quang Tri and then to Huế, the brigade was replaced by the fresh 369th Marine Brigade which established a new defensive line at Firebase Nancy. The capture of Camp Carroll and Mai Loc allowed PAVN forces to cross the Cam Lộ bridge, 11 km to the west of Đông Hà. The PAVN then had almost unrestricted access to western Quảng Trị Province north of the Thạch Hãn River.

On 7 April the Marines withdrew from Đông Hà leaving the defense to the 57th Regiment, the 1st ARVN Armored Brigade, 20th Tank Battalion and the 4th and 5th Ranger Groups. At dawn on 9 April the PAVN launched an attack, led by tanks, against Firebase Pedro southwest of Quảng Trị. The PAVN tanks had outrun their infantry support and nine tanks were lost in a minefield around Pedro. An armored task force of eight M48s and 12 M113s from the ARVN 20th Tank Battalion were despatched from Ái Tử to support the Marines at Pedro. At the same time a flight of RVNAF A-1 Skyraiders arrived overhead and destroyed five tanks. When the ARVN armor arrived they destroyed five T-54s for no losses and drove one captured T-54 back to Ái Tử. On 10 and 11 April further PAVN attacks on Pedro were repulsed at a cost of over 200 PAVN estimated killed. On 23 April the 147th Marine Brigade returned to Ái Tử and the 258th Marine Brigade redeployed to Huế leaving its 1st Battalion at Firebase Pedro under the control of the 147th Brigade.

On 28 April the commander of the 20th Tank Battalion withdrew from Đông Hà to deal with a PAVN force threatening Ái Tử Combat Base; seeing the tanks leaving, the soldiers of the 57th Regiment panicked and abandoned their positions leading to the collapse of the ARVN defensive line. The 7th Marine Battalion was sent to Ái Tử to help defend the base. At 02:00 on 29 April the PAVN attacked the ARVN positions north and south of the base and the ARVN defenses began to crumble, by midday on 30 April Giai ordered a withdrawal from Ái Tử to a defensive line along the south of the Thạch Hãn River and the withdrawal was completed late that day. On 1 May with his forces disintegrating Giai decided that any further defense of Quảng Trị city was pointless and that the ARVN should withdraw to a defensive line along the Mỹ Chánh River 13 km to the south. The 147th Marine Brigade which was the only unit maintaining any cohesiveness departed the city in an armored convoy and regrouped that evening at Camp Evans.

On 3 May I Corps commander General Lãm was replaced by Lieutenant general Ngô Quang Trưởng, commander of IV Corps, and this change of command and reinforcement by forces of the general reserve stabilized the ARVN position in Thừa Thiên Province. The remainder of the Marine Division was deployed to Huế and was given responsibility for north and northwest Thừa Thiên Province, while the 1st Division was given responsibility for the area southwest and south of Huế blocking any further PAVN advance from the A Sầu Valley.

On 8 May the 2nd Airborne Brigade arrived at Huế and came under the operational control of the Division on the My Chanh Line. The entire Airborne Division arrived in late May and was given responsibility for a sector between the Division and the 1st Division. The 1st Marine Division then assumed control of the 1st Ranger Group which had just arrived from Da Nang.

On 13 May two battalions of the 369th Brigade launched a heliborne assault on helicopters of the US 9th Marine Amphibious Brigade (9th MAB) against PAVN positions in the Hải Lăng District southeast of Quảng Trị, sweeping the area before returning to the My Chanh line.

On 21 May the PAVN hit the Marine defenses in an attempt to regain the initiative. After achieving an initial breakthrough the PAVN were forced back by the 3rd and 6th Battalions which regained their original positions by the evening of 22 May.

On 24 May with support from the US 9th MAB the 147th Brigade conducted an amphibious assault at Wunder Beach 10 km north of the My Chanh Line and a heliborne assault 6 km inland at Co Luy. The Brigade swept the area for several days and then returned to the My Chanh Line.

On 28 May President Thiệu promoted Division commander Colonel Bui The Lan to Brigadier general at the Imperial City, Huế.

From 11 to 18 June the Marine Division and the Airborne Division conducted probing attacks to test PAVN strength ahead of the launch of Trưởng's Operation Lam Son 72 to recapture Quảng Trị Province. The operational plan called for the Airborne and Marine Divisions to advance abreast to the northwest to the Thạch Hãn River. The Airborne Division would deploy to the west from the foothills to Highway 1, while the Marine Division would deploy to the east from Highway 1 to the coast. Quảng Trị City would be in the Airborne Division's operational area, but the plan called for the city to be bypassed so as to concentrate on the destruction of PAVN forces. As a diversion the US 9th MAB would conduct a feint amphibious assault against the mouth of the Cua Viet River.

On the morning of 27 June the 9th MAB launched their amphibious feint against the Cua Viet, reversing course when 7 km from shore. On 28 June the South Vietnamese advance began and quickly ran into strong PAVN resistance and helicopter assaults were launched to land troops behind PAVN positions. On 29 June, following preparatory airstrikes the 1st and 4th Marine Battalions were landed by Marine helicopter squadrons HMM-164 and HMM-165 near the Wunder Beach area. By 7 July the Airborne advance had reached the southern outskirts of Quảng Trị, but became bogged down as the PAVN defended tenaciously.

On 11 July, following preparatory B-52 strikes, the 1st Marine Battalion was deployed by HMM-164 and HMM-165 helicopters to two landing zones 2 km northeast of the city to cut Route 560, the main PAVN supply line. This move would force the PAVN to reinforce and resupply across the Thạch Hãn River, making them vulnerable to air strikes. The helicopters were met by heavy anti-aircraft fire with one CH-53 hit by an SA-7 and crashing with two U.S. Marine crewmen and 45 Vietnamese Marines killed. Two CH-46s were shot down while another 25 helicopters were damaged. Despite these loses the Marines deployed successfully and consolidated their positions with air and artillery support. After a vicious, three-day battle the 48th Regiment, 320B Division broke and withdrew to the west.

By 20 July the Marine Division had consolidated its position north of Quảng Trị City, while the Airborne continued trying to break in. On 22 July the Marines launched a three battalion operation against PAVN supply lines south of the Cua Viet River. The 5th Battalion would be landed by HMM-164 helicopters 4 km north of the city, while the other two battalions, supported by tanks would attack north, the combined force would then move southeast. The helicopter landing proceeded smoothly, while the ground assault met heavy resistance and could only break through PAVN defenses with air and artillery support. After two days the Marines had killed 133 PAVN and destroyed three tanks.

On 27 July, the Marine Division was ordered to relieve the Airborne units as the lead element in the battle. But progress was slow, consisting of vicious house-to-house fighting and incessant artillery barrages by both sides. On 9 September, the final assault to capture the heavily defended citadel was launched by the 147th and 258th Marine Brigades. The citadel was finally captured on 16 September. Meanwhile, between 11 and 15 September the 2nd Marine Battalion advanced to the southern bank of the Thạch Hãn River, where they halted, exhausted and depleted by heavy casualties and unable to push on to Đông Hà. During the operation, the Marines suffered 3,658 casualties.

In late October 1972 the ARVN and Marines began attacks north of Quảng Trị to try to regain positions along the south bank of the Cam Lộ/Cửa Việt River. The attacks were met with stiff PAVN resistance and were stopped at the Thạch Hãn River. A further attack from the coast by the Marines in November made limited gains. By the end of 1972 the Marines and ARVN occupied positions 5 km south of the river. As the ongoing peace negotiations would soon lead to a ceasefire, the South Vietnamese Joint General Staff (JGS) sought the most advantageous battlefield positions possible and so ordered a further effort to regain the south bank of the Cam Lộ/Cửa Việt River. On 15 January 1973 planning began for a final assault on Cửa Việt. A special combined unit called Task Force Tango was organized, consisting of the 3rd, 4th and 5th Marine Battalions and elements of the 1st Armored Brigade. The task force was put under the command of Colonel Nguyen Thanh Tri, Deputy commander of the Division. The operation began at 06:55 on 26 January with Task Force Tango advancing in two columns. Besides ARVN firepower, twelve B-52 bombers from the US Air Force and naval gunfire of the United States Seventh Fleet was used to soften the PAVN-occupied Cửa Việt Base and hinder PAVN reinforcements. The PAVN put up fierce resistance to the attack, destroying 26 M-48s and M-113s with AT-3 missiles and shooting down two Republic of Vietnam Air Force planes with SA-7 missiles. At 01:45 on 28 January the Marines made a final assault and by 07:00 had broken through the PAVN lines to recapture the base. At 08:00 in accordance with the Paris Peace Accords the ceasefire came into effect and the US stopped all support for Task Force Tango. On the evening of 29 January, the PAVN launched a counterattack against Task Force Tango, and by the next day had succeeded in cutting off its lines of communication and began bombarding the encircled Marines. A Republic of Vietnam Navy LCM was destroyed as it tried to resupply the Marines. The Marines attempted to break out on the early morning of 31 January and the PAVN recaptured the base. South Vietnamese losses were recorded as 40 casualties and 20 armored vehicles destroyed in the battle between 28 and 31 January.

In 1972 Thiệu finally moved General Khang out of the Division which he had commanded since February 1964, transferring him to a nebulous "special assistant" post under General Cao Văn Viên on the JGS and replacing him with General Bui The Lan.

=== 1973–1975 ===
In December 1974 the 147th Marine Brigade replaced the 2nd Airborne Brigade west of Huế. The Marine Division itself pulled two battalions out of forward positions northwest of Huế to constitute a heavier reserve and further thinning the force, sent one company from each battalion to Saigon to form the new 468th Marine Brigade for the JGS reserve effective 1 January 1975. Later in the month, Marine positions in Quảng Trị were taken over by Regional Force battalions, and three marine battalions were shifted south to Thua Thien Province.

In early March the 468th Brigade was deployed to Tân An, Long An Province to stiffen the defenses of the Regional and Popular Forces there.

On 9 March a PAVN assault supported by at least 20 tanks hit the Song Bo corridor defended by the 147th Brigade consisting of five battalions - the 3rd, 4th, 5th and 7th Marines and the 130th RF Battalion. The attacks continued for two days and one marine position was lost but the 4th Marine Battalion recovered it on 11 March. In two days of heavy fighting, with moderate casualties, the 147th Brigade killed more than 200 PAVN, destroyed 2 tanks and damaged 7, and captured many weapons.

On 12 March, I Corps commander General Trưởng received the JGS order to pull the Airborne Division out of the line and start it moving to Saigon. The deployment was to begin on 17 March. Trưởng immediately called General Viên to protest the decision but learned that President Thieu had personally directed the deployment so that the Airborne Division could participate in the offensive to retake Ban Me Thuot. Viên told Trưởng that, if possible, two battalions of the new 468th Marine Brigade and a Ranger group would be sent north to replace the Airborne Division. To adjust to the loss of the Airborne Division, Trưởng decided to pull the Marine Division out of Quảng Trị and northern Thua Thien Provinces and shift it south to cover Phú Lộc District and Da Nang. The 14th Ranger Group would move north to relieve the Marines on 13 March. Only one Marine brigade, the one in Phú Lộc, would remain north of the Hải Vân Pass.

Trưởng flew to Saigon on 13 March to participate in a secret meeting with Thiệu, Prime Minister Trần Thiện Khiêm and Viên during which Trưởng was told about the evacuation from the Central Highlands and ordered to prepare a plan for the eventual evacuation of I Corps. He also was permitted to delay the first airborne brigade's departure to 18 March and the rest of the division until 31 March. Thiệu's reasoning was that Da Nang was most important, but that the rest of the region could be sacrificed. He would send the 468th Marine Brigade north to help defend Da Nang as soon as the Airborne Division arrived in Saigon. This division was vital to the defense of III and IV Corps, without which South Vietnam could no longer survive.

On 14 March, Trưởng met with General Thi, commanding I Corps troops in Quảng Trị and Thua Thien Provinces, and General Lan, the Division commander, to explain his concept for the final defense of Da Nang. He would pull all combat forces into Quang Nam and defend Da Nang with the 1st, 3rd and Marine Divisions on line and the 2nd Division in reserve, but this deployment would be approached gradually as divisional troops were relieved in Quang Tri and Thua Thien Provinces and terrain in the southern part of the region was abandoned.

On 15 March, the 14th Ranger Group was to begin the relief of the 369th Marine Brigade in Quang Tri Province. While the 147th Marine Brigade would remain in the Song Bo Valley for the defense of Huế, the 369th Marine Brigade would deploy to Đại Lộc District in Quang Nam Province and relieve the 3rd Airborne Brigade for movement to Saigon. Trưởng and Thi anticipated a mass civilian exodus from Quảng Trị as soon as the people saw that the Marines were leaving, and he directed his staff to prepare plans to assist the refugees.

The 258th Marine Brigade pulled out of Quang Tri to relieve the Airborne brigade in southern Thua Thien on 17 March. The Marine Division command post was set up at Marble Mountain Air Facility southeast of Da Nang on 18 March while the 2nd Airborne Brigade moved to the Da Nang docks for shipment to Saigon.

On 18 March, Khiêm flew to Da Nang to meet with Trưởng and advised him that due to attacks elsewhere no additional troops would be sent to I Corps; the promised 468th Marine Brigade would remain in the defense of Saigon.

On 19 March at meetings in Saigon with Thiệu Trưởng was directed to stop the evacuation of Hue and to defend enclaves at Huế, Da Nang, Chu Lai and Quang Ngai City. He could, when forced, surrender Chu Lai and Quang Ngai, but he was to defend Huế and Da Nang at all costs.

When Trưởng returned to his headquarters on 20 March, he turned around the displacing 175mm. batteries moving to Da Nang and stopped the evacuation of ammunition from Huế. The Imperial City would be defended despite the fact that PAVN artillery had, on 19 March, already struck inside the Citadel and Highway 1 was clogged with the southbound traffic of thousands of refugees. The contracted organization for the defense of Huế, under the command of Thi, was divided between the deputy commander of the Marine Division, Colonel Tri, who was responsible north of Hue, and the 1st Division commander. Brigadier general Nguyen Van Diem, south of the city. Tri's outposts were just inside the Thua Thien-Quang Tri boundary, nearly 30 km northwest of Huế. Here, under the direct command of the 14th Ranger Group, were the 77th Ranger Battalion, seven RF battalions, and a troop of armored personnel carriers of the 17th Armored Cavalry Squadron. The four Marine battalions of the 147th Brigade were in the vital Bo Corridor, within light artillery range of the Citadel, while the 78th and 79th Ranger Battalions were on outposts 10 km west of the Marines. South of the Marines, on the high ground at Fire Support Base Lion (also called Nui Gio) was the 51st Regiment, 1st Division, with two of its battalions. Diem's responsibility began southwest of his 51st Regiment, which was attached to Tri's command. The 3rd Infantry Regiment, with two battalions, held the high ground around Firebase Birmingham, above the Song Huu Trach, south of Huế. East of the 3rd Infantry, the 54th Regiment with two of its battalions defended the Mo Tau sector, while the reinforced 1st Infantry Regiment extended the line southeast to the Nui Bong area. The 1st Infantry had, in addition to its own three battalions, one battalion of the 51st Regiment, a company of M48 tanks and a troop of armored personnel carriers. The 15th Ranger Group, with its three battalions and one battalion of the 3rd Regiment, dug in on the hills above Highway 1 west of Phú Lộc District Town. The 258th Marine Brigade, with two battalions, was also near Phú Lộc, while the 914th RF Group of three battalions guarded the Hải Vân Pass.

On the morning of 21 March the lead battalions of the PAVN 324B and 325th Divisions, together with the independent Tri-Thien Regiment, with heavy artillery support, assaulted South Vietnamese positions from the Bo Corridor to Phú Lộc. The attacks against the Marines in the Bo Valley were repulsed with heavy PAVN losses, but the Phú Lộc sector, taking the brunt of the attack, began to crumble. In the area of the ARVN 1st Regiment, the PAVN 18th Regiment, 325th Division, supported by the 98th Artillery Regiment, took Hill 350 and drove on to assault Nui Bong. Although the mountain changed hands three times that afternoon, the 2nd Battalion, 1st Infantry, controlled it on 22 March. Other formations of the 325th, notably the 101st Regiment, forced the 60th Ranger Battalion, 15th Group, from Hill 500 west of Phú Lộc, and supporting artillery interdicted Highway 1. A stream of refugees began piling up along the road northwest of Phú Lộc. By evening, however, one lane was opened for traffic to Da Nang.

On 23 March the 913th Regional Forces Group on the My Chanh Line north of Huế withdrew without orders and they refused to stop at the next delaying position near Phong Dien District Town. The 913th's pullout caused some panic among other forces and a general rout developed. I Corps officers attempted to rally the troops at the Bo River. The mass desertion was not motivated by fear of the PAVN but by the soldiers' overwhelming concern for the safety of their families in Huế.

On 24 March, after receiving the report of the collapse of the My Chanh line, Trưởng met with his commanders, Thi, Major general Lan, Major general Hoang Van Lac (deputy commander of I Corps) and 1st Air Division commander, Brigadier general Nguyen Duc Khanh. Lac reported that Da Nang was close to panic also, with more than 300,000 refugees jamming the streets. At 18:00 on 24 March. Trưởng ordered Thi to begin the evacuation of all troops defending Huế. All forces north and west of Huế would assemble at Tân Mỹ Base, the port of Huế northeast of the city, cross the narrow channel to Phu Thuan and march southwest down Vinh Loc Island (16.429°N 107.8°E). Crossing the mouth of Dam Cau Hai Bay on a pontoon bridge to be constructed by ARVN engineers and moving along the beach to Highway 1, they would cross over the Hải Vân Pass and on to Da Nang. No trucks, tanks, or guns could make this march; all would have to be disabled or destroyed. The 1st Division would protect the column by blocking in Phu Thu District. By the time these orders were issued, what was left of the population of Hue was streaming toward Tân Mỹ Base to take any available boat or ship out of Thua Thien Province. I Corps Forward commanded by Thi, established its command post in Tân Mỹ, together with the command posts of the Marine Division and the 147th Marine Brigade. The 7th Marine Battalion deployed there to secure the port and the command posts. The 1st Division withdrew from the Troui-Nui Bong sector. The 15th Ranger Group, which had held the Troui River for the pulled back to Phu Bai Combat Base with heavy casualties. The 54th Regiment withdrew from the Mo Tau sector to Camp Eagle, southeast of Huế near Highway 1. The 3rd Regiment withdrew from its forward positions on the Son Hue Trach and assembled in Nam Hoa, south of Huế. The 51st Infantry pulled back and located just west of the city while the division headquarters and the 1st Regiment, which had suffered moderate casualties in the Nui Bong sector, were around Huế. Just as the withdrawal was well under way Trưởng was visited by a delegation of officers from the JGS, carrying orders to release the Marine Division immediately for the defense of Saigon. Pointing out that he could not defend Da Nang without the Marines, Trưởng objected. The JGS suggested giving up Chu Lai and sending the 2nd Division to Da Nang. Trưởng issued the order to the 2nd Division, but still insisted that Da Nang could not be held without the Marine Division; by the time he recovered what was left of the 1st and 2nd Divisions, neither would be combat effective.

The withdrawal from Thua Thien Province began in a rather orderly fashion. The 258th Marine Brigade linked up with the 914th RF Group on Vinh Loc Island to cross the narrow channel over to Loc Tri in Phú Lộc District, but the bridge to be installed by ARVN engineers never got there; engineer boats were evidently commandeered by other military units attempting to escape. The withdrawing forces crossed anyway, using local fishing boats. Trưởng flew over the column making its way down the long stretch of Vinh Loc Island and noted that the only apparent disciplined, cohesive units were marines. The rest was a mob. Delayed by heavy seas on 25 March the 147th Marine Brigade left Tân Mỹ the next day for Da Nang. Also on 26 March, the marine battalion of the 258th Brigade holding the Phu Gia Pass, a short, twisting defile about 15 km east of Phú Lộc District Town came under attack. With the PAVN approaching the Hải Vân Pass from the north and Vietnamese Navy boats breaking down faster than they could be repaired, Trưởng stopped the sea movement of forces and equipment from Huế. Further, because he had been unable to reinforce Da Nang with adequate strength from the 2nd Division, he elected to concentrate the recoverable elements of the Marine Division at Da Nang. However, PAVN pressure on the 3rd Division west of Da Nang, led Trưởng to order a withdrawal to a shorter line within artillery range of the center of Da Nang. Attempts to hold that line failed as large numbers of 3rd Division soldiers deserted to save their families. With defeat imminent, Trưởng shipped all organized forces, mostly Marines, out of Da Nang toward Saigon, then he and most of his staff left; some of them, Trưởng included, had to swim through the surf to the rescuing fleet of boats. Da Nang, the last enclave of South Vietnam presence in I Corps, belonged to the PAVN by nightfall on 30 March.

By 2 April, the survivors of the Marine Division were disembarking at Vung Tau. Under the leadership of Major general Bui The Lan, they were moved into the 4th Battalion's camp there for processing and reorganization. In all, of the 12,000 Marines who had been deployed in I Corps, about 4,000 were at Vung Tau. The equipment for a reorganized division was on hand in the Saigon-Long Binh area, but moving it to Vung Tau would be difficult. A more serious problem was the shortage of infantry leaders; five Marine battalion commanders and 40 company commanders had been killed in action during March and April. Nevertheless, the division rapidly took shape. One brigade of three rifle battalions and one artillery battalion was ready to receive equipment in three days. Ten days later, an additional similar brigade was formed. A Marine brigade was responsible for the defense of Long Binh in the final defense around Saigon.

On 19 April as the JGS ordered a withdrawal from Xuân Lộc, a new defensive line was formed east of Bien Hoa at the town of Trảng Bom which was defended by the remnants of the 18th Division, the 468th Marine Brigade and the reconstituted 258th Marine Brigade.

At 04:00 on 27 April the 341st Division attacked Trang Bom, the initial attack was repulsed but by 08:00 attacks on the flanks broke through and the town was captured with the 18th Division suffering heavy casualties in their retreat. The PAVN then advanced to the town of Hố Nai (now Tân Hòa), which was held by the Marines. Hố Nai was defended by the 6th Marine Battalion, an M48 tank from the 3rd Armored and Popular Forces. Following an artillery barrage the PAVN attacked Hố Nai, but were met by ARVN artillery losing 30 dead and one T-54 tank destroyed before they pulled back. On 28 April the 341st renewed their attack using 5 T-54s supported by an infantry regiment, but were repulsed in three separate attacks losing three T-54s and many soldiers. On 29 April the entire 341st Division attacked Hố Nai and were again repulsed in two hours of fighting. At midday the Marines were ordered to withdraw to defend Bien Hoa and Long Binh. Brigadier general Trần Quang Khôi, commander of the 3rd Armored was given responsibility for defending Bien Hoa, although PAVN shelling had rendered the base unusable. Seeing the regular forces leaving Hố Nai the PAVN renewed their assault at midnight, but the town's Popular Forces fought back and were not subdued until dawn. The PAVN then advanced to Bien Hoa where they were met by the 3rd Armored, at this point the PAVN 4th Corps changed the axis of their advance to the south.

On the morning of 30 April the 18th Division and Marines were ordered to retreat from Long Binh to the west bank of the Đồng Nai river, while the ARVN 81st Rangers held Bien Hoa Air Base and the 3rd Armored held Bien Hoa. The 3rd Armored was moving from Bien Hoa to attack PAVN forces when they heard the surrender broadcast of President Dương Văn Minh and Khôi halted his advance and disbanded the unit. The 81st Rangers had abandoned the base and had moved west of the Đồng Nai river when they heard the surrender broadcast and then marched towards Saigon to surrender to the PAVN.

== Units ==
Divisional Units

- Headquarters Battalion
- Amphibious Support Battalion
- Signal Battalion
- Engineer Battalion
- Medical Battalion
- Anti-tank Company
- Military Police Company
- Long Range Reconnaissance Patrol Company

147th Marine Brigade (Brigades were numbered after the battalions they contained)

- 1st Marine Battalion - "Wild Birds"
- 4th Marine Battalion - "Killer Sharks"
- 7th Marine Battalion - "Grey Tigers"
- 1st Marine Artillery Battalion - "Lightning Fire"

258th Marine Brigade

- 2nd Marine Battalion - "Crazy Buffaloes"
- 5th Marine Battalion - "Black Dragons"
- 8th Marine Battalion - "Sea Eagles"
- 2nd Marine Artillery Battalion - "Divine Arrows"

369th Marine Brigade

- 3rd Marine Battalion - "Sea Wolves"
- 6th Marine Battalion - "Divine Hawks"
- 9th Marine Battalion - "Ferocious Tigers"
- 3rd Marine Artillery Battalion - "Divine Crossbows"

468th Marine Brigade (formed in December 1974)

- 14th Marine Battalion
- 16th Marine Battalion
- 18th Marine Battalion
- 4th Marine Artillery Battalion - "Tan Lap"

== Commanders ==
- Major Lê Quang Mỹ (August 1954 - October 1954)
- Lt. Colonel Lê Quang Trọng (October 1954 - January 1956)
- Major Phạm Văn Liễu (January 1956 - August 1956)
- Vice Captain Bùi Phó Chí (August 1956 - October 1956)
- Major Lê Như Hùng (October 1956 - May 1960)
- Major Le Nguyen Khang (May 1960 - November 1963)
- Lt. Colonel Nguyễn Bá Liên (November 1963 - February 1964)
- Lieutenant General Le Nguyen Khang (February 1964 - May 1972)
- Brigadier General Bùi Thế Lân (May 1972 - April 1975)

== Ranks and insignia ==
=== Commissioned officer ranks ===
The rank insignia of commissioned officers.

Rank group	General / flag officers			Senior officers			Junior officers
Republic of Vietnam Marine Division (1955-1963)
Republic of Vietnam Marine Division (1955-1963)		Thiếu tướng	Chuẩn tướng	Đại tá	Trung tá	Thiếu tá	Đại úy	Trung úy	Thiếu úy
Republic of Vietnam Marine Division (1964-1975)
Republic of Vietnam Marine Division (1964-1975)	Trung tướng	Thiếu tướng	Chuẩn tướng	Đại tá	Trung tá	Thiếu tá	Đại úy	Trung úy	Thiếu úy

=== Other ranks ===
The rank insignia of non-commissioned officers and enlisted personnel.

Rank group	Senior NCOs				Junior NCOs		Enlisted
Republic of Vietnam Marine Division (1954-1967)								No insignia
Republic of Vietnam Marine Division (1954-1967)	Thượng sĩ nhất	Thượng sĩ	Trung sĩ nhất	Trung sĩ	Hạ sĩ nhất	Hạ sĩ	Binh nhất	Binh nhì
Republic of Vietnam Marine Division (1967-1975)								No insignia
Republic of Vietnam Marine Division (1967-1975)	Thượng sĩ nhất	Thượng sĩ	Trung sĩ nhất	Trung sĩ	Hạ sĩ nhất	Hạ sĩ	Binh nhất	Binh nhì

== Equipment ==
Generally, the VNMC weapons and personal equipments were mostly (if not all) supplied by the United States Marine Corps during the war. However, certain equipment were also routed from the Army as well. The VNMC rarely had any equipment that was RVN genuine, because the unit was US-advised. However, their tigerstripe camouflage uniform was considered genuine and is still a valuable collector's item.

- 75 mm howitzer battery
- 105 mm cannon
- M1917 revolver
- M1911A1 pistol
- M1903A3 Springfield
- M1 Garand rifle
- M1, M1A1, & M2 Carbine
- M3 Grease gun
- Thompson submachine gun
- CAR-15
- M16 rifle
- M60 machine gun
- M1918A2
- M1917 Browning machine gun
- M1919 Browning machine gun
- Browning M2HB .50cal Heavy Machine Gun
- Mark 2 Fragmentation Hand/Rifle Grenade
- M61 Fragmentation Hand Grenade
- M79 Grenade Launcher
- M72 LAW
- BGM-71 TOW anti-tank missile 12 units and 50 missiles
- M113 armored vehicle
