= Firebase Nancy =

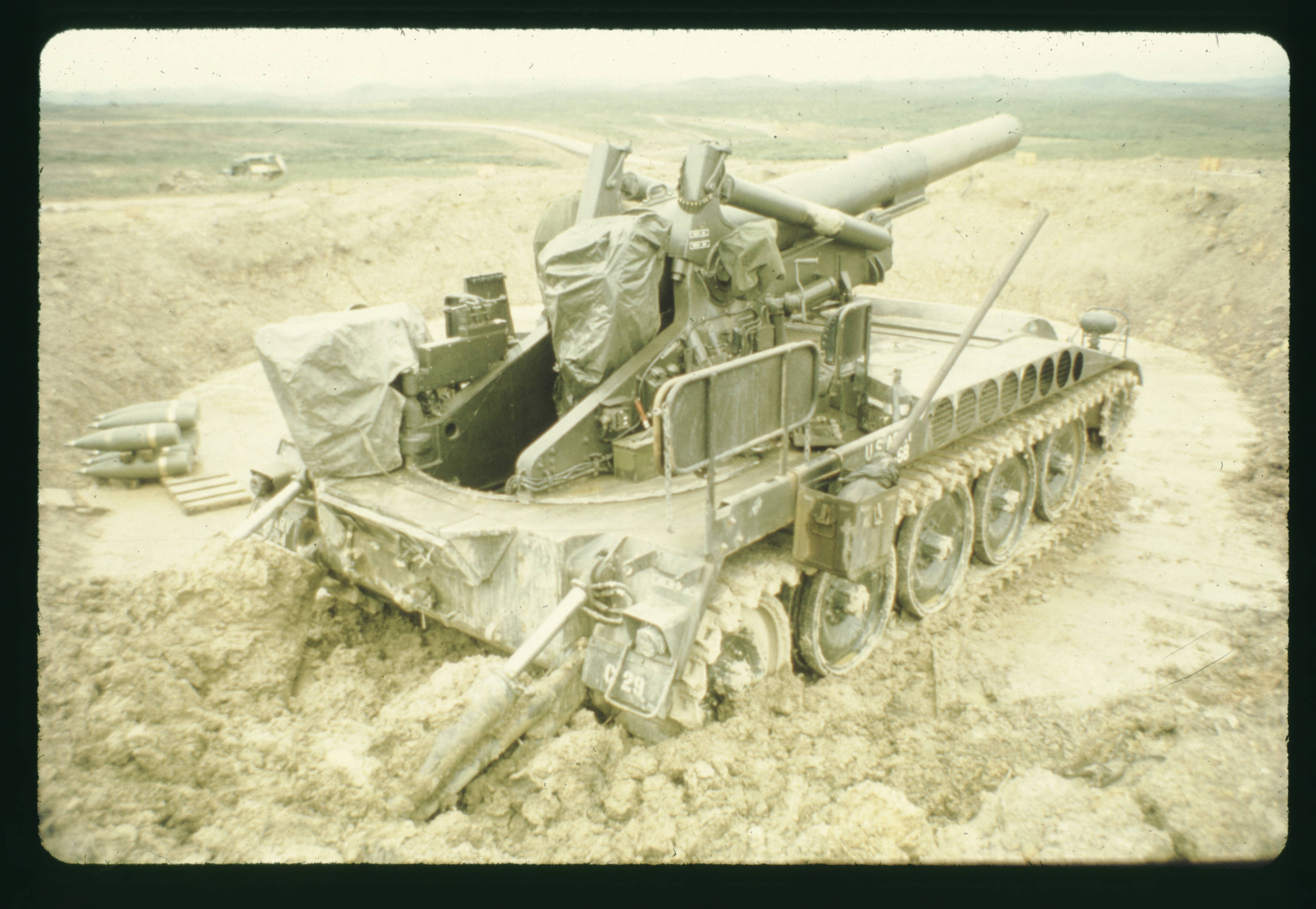
- Artillery at Firebase Nancy, 9 November 1968

Site information
- Type: Army
- Condition: abandoned

Location
- Coordinates: 16.632°N 107.294°E

Site history
- Built: 1968
- In use: 1968-72
- Battles/wars: Vietnam War

Firebase Nancy (later known as Firebase My Chanh) was a U.S. Army and Army of the Republic of Vietnam (ARVN) fire support base located 9 miles (14 km) southeast of Quảng Trị in central Vietnam.

== History ==
Nancy was located approximately 9 miles (14 km) southeast of Quảng Trị and northwest of Huế.

On 13 April 1970 at 02:45 Nancy received mortar fire followed at 03:50 by a ground attack by a People's Army of Vietnam (PAVN) sapper company. The defenders, comprising a unit of the ARVN 1st Regiment, 1st Division and a U.S. artillery unit, returned fire and the PAVN withdrew. At dusk ARVN soldiers sweeping the perimeter made sporadic contact with PAVN. PAVN losses were 71 killed and nine captured and 11 individual and six crew-served weapons captured; U.S. losses were four killed.

In late March 1972 at the start of the Easter Offensive Nancy was occupied by the Republic of Vietnam Marine Division's 258th Brigade which together with the 147th Marine Brigade at Mai Loc Camp defended the western approaches to the coastal lowlands of Quảng Trị Province and which were believed to be the most likely direction of any PAVN assault. On the evening of 2 May following intense artillery fire and ground attacks the ARVN abandoned Nancy and fell back behind the Mỹ Chánh River to form a new defense known as the Mỹ Chánh Line.

== Current use ==
The base has been turned over to farmland.
