= Wunder Beach =

Former US Army base in Vietnam (Utah Beach)

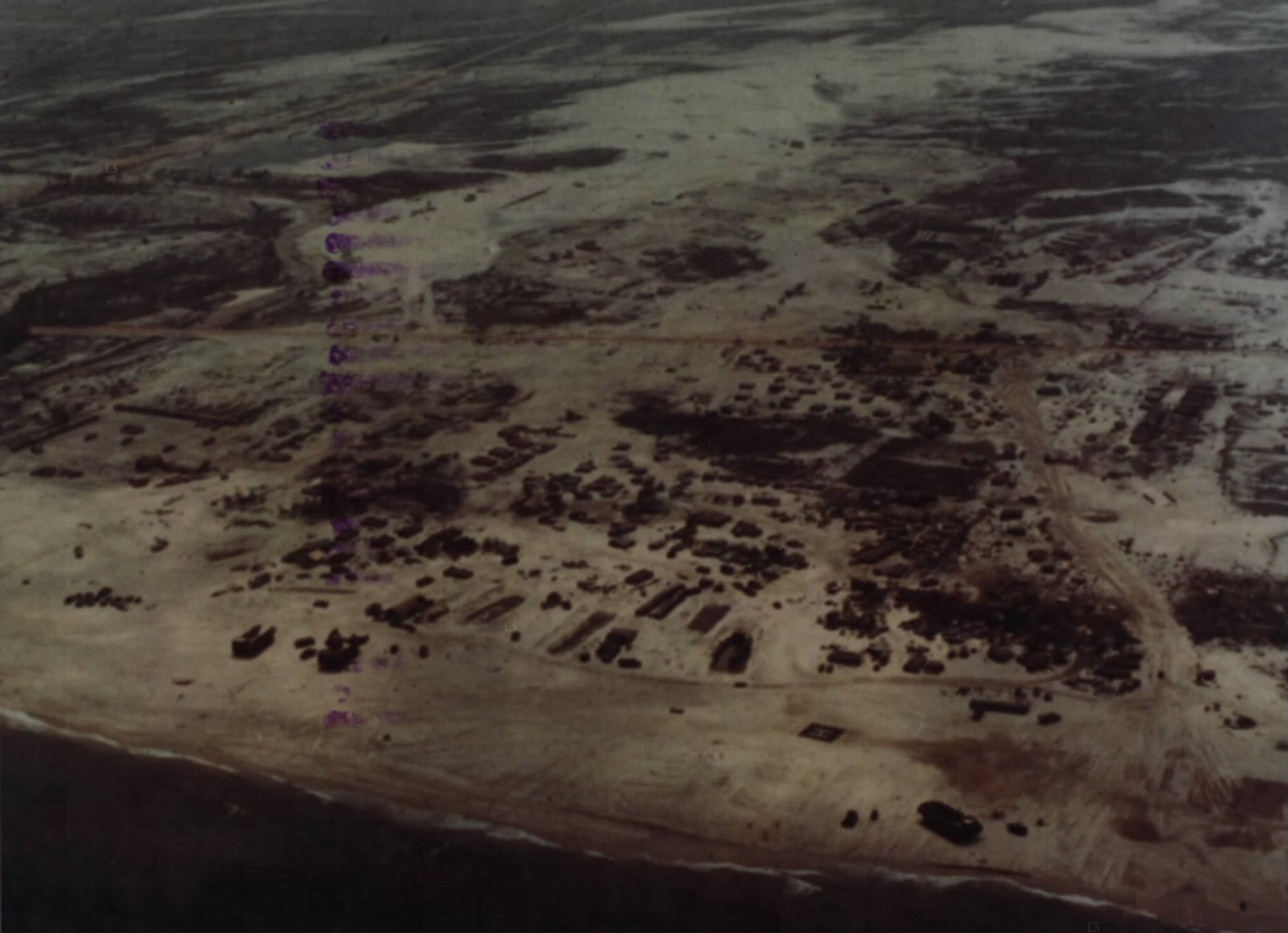
- Wunder Beach, 17 May 1968

Site information
- Type: Army Base

Location
- Coordinates: 16.78°N 107.335°E

Site history
- Built: 1968
- In use: 1968-70
- Battles/wars: Vietnam War

Garrison information
- Occupants: 159th Transport Battalion

Wunder Beach (also known as Wonder Beach, Utah Beach and Sunder Beach) is a former U.S. Army logistics and supply base along the coast east of Quảng Trị and northwest of Huế.

== History ==
The U.S. first established a base known as Utah Beach on 2 March 1968 to support the Tet Counteroffensive. The base was located on the coast at Thon Me Thuy, 16 km east of Quảng Trị and 40 km northwest of Huế.

The base was developed as a ship offloading and logistics facility operated by the 159th Transport Battalion to support the operations of the 1st Cavalry Division and later the 101st Airborne Division.

Other units based here included:

- 14th Engineer Battalion
- 2nd Battalion, 501st Infantry
- 3rd Battalion, 26th Marines

On 24 April 1968 the positions of the 1st Battalion, 26th Marines at Wunder Beach were hit by 11-15 rounds of 5" naval gunfire from USS Mullany killing two Marines.

On 24 May 1972 during the Easter Offensive the Republic of Vietnam Marine Division's 147th Marine Brigade conducted an amphibious assault onto Wunder Beach before returning several days later to the Mỹ Chánh Line 10 km to the south.

== Current use ==
The base has been turned over to housing and farmland. In recent times, a South Korean infrastructure developer has undertaken a deepwater seaport development project on this plot of land, called My Thuy International Port. The Port upon completion will have 10 berths, and will be constructed in 3 phases.
