= Mai Loc Camp =

Site information
- Type: Army
- Condition: abandoned

Location
- Coordinates: 16.733°N 106.961°E

Site history
- Built: 1968
- In use: 1968-72
- Battles/wars: Vietnam War

Garrison information
- Occupants: 5th Special Forces Group

Mai Loc Airfield
- IATA: none; ICAO: none

Summary
- Elevation AMSL: 348 ft (106 m)

Runways
Direction	Length		Surface
Direction	ft	m	Surface
	3,200	975	laterite

Mai Loc Camp (also known as Firebase Mai Loc and Firebase Victory) was a U.S. Army and Army of the Republic of Vietnam (ARVN) base located west of Quảng Trị in central Vietnam.

== History ==
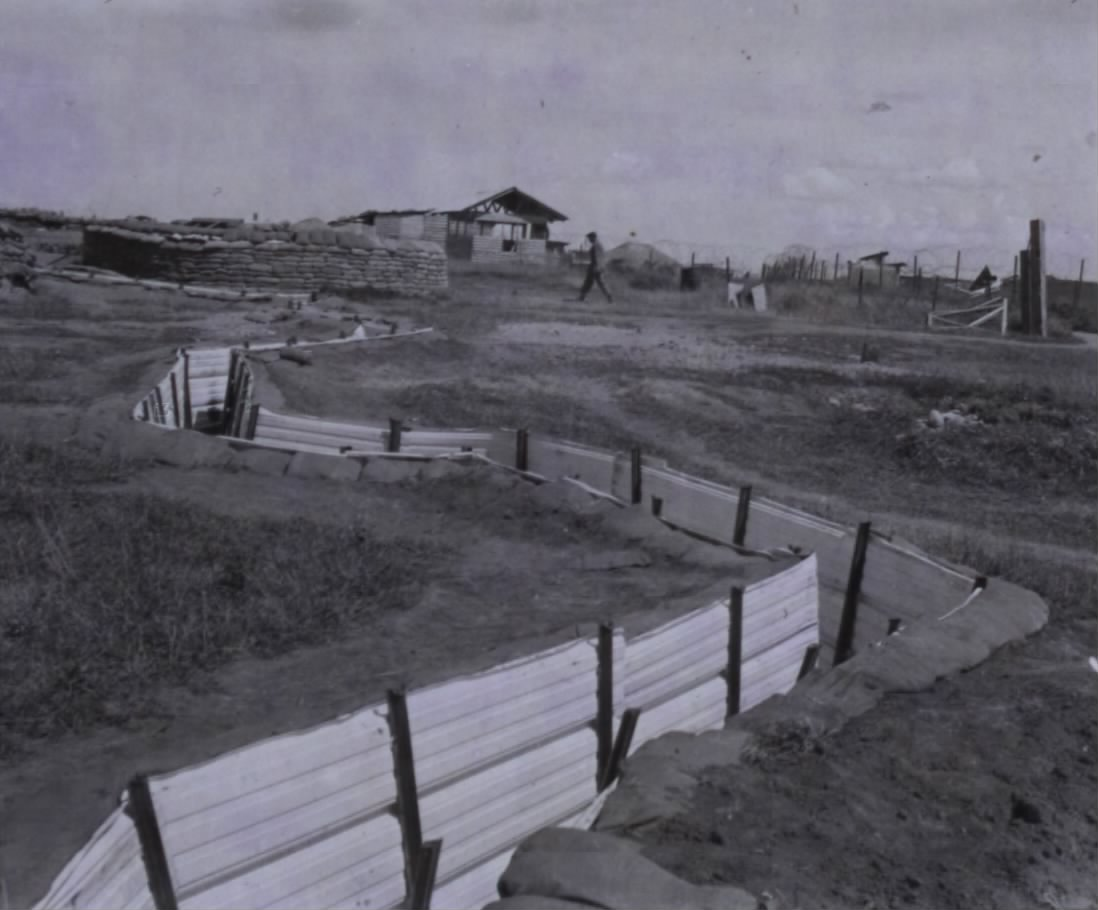
Bunkers and trench line on the perimeter of Mai Loc Camp, 16 October 1969

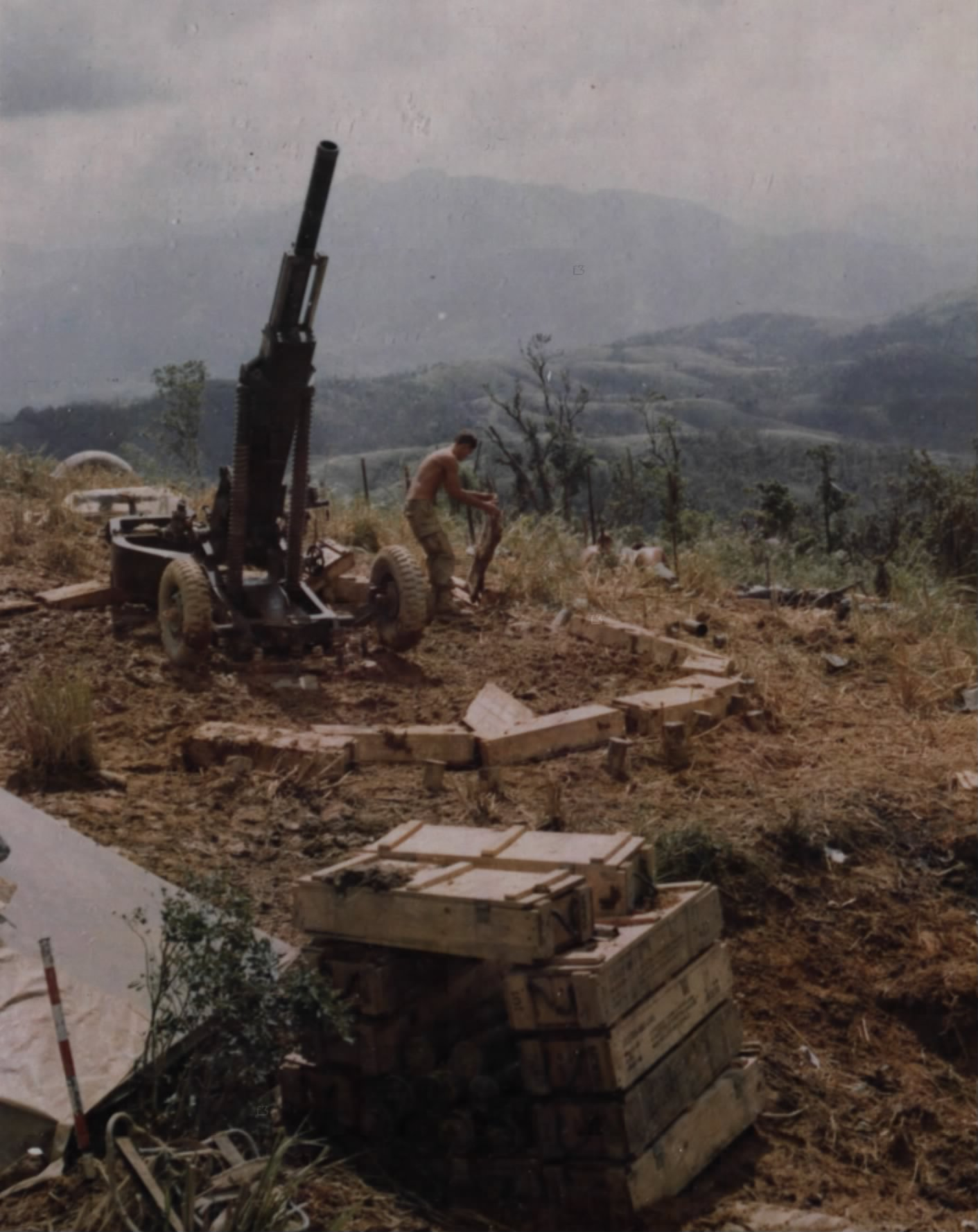
Soldier of the 1st Battalion, 506th Infantry, 101st Airborne Division, lays the foundation for a blastwall to protect an M102 105mm howitzer, 16 October 1969

Mai Loc was located approximately 8 km southwest of Ca Lu Combat Base and 25 km west of Quảng Trị.

The 5th Special Forces Group first established the base here in early 1968.

The 3rd Brigade, 101st Airborne Division comprising:

- 3rd Battalion, 187th Infantry
- 1st Battalion, 506th Infantry
- 2nd Battalion, 506th Infantry

supported by 2nd Battalion, 319th Artillery was based here in October–November 1969.

On 9 April 1970 at 23:00 a Tripflare was activated on the perimeter of the camp alerting the defenders. At 02:35 on 10 April the camp was hit by 75-100 82mm mortar and Rocket-propelled grenade rounds followed by a sapper attack. The Civilian Irregular Defense Group (CIDG) forces, their Special Forces advisers and artillerymen with M42 Dusters defended the camp. The sappers penetrated the perimeter but were unable to reach the inner perimeter and tactical operations center. At 03:40 a unit from the 1st Brigade, 5th Infantry Division (Mechanized) reinforced the camp and helicopter gunships and a Republic of Vietnam Air Force (RVNAF) AC-47 Spooky gunship provided fire support. The People's Army of Vietnam (PAVN) forces withdrew by 04:55 leaving 19 dead; U.S. losses were six killed (including four members of the 14th Engineer Battalion) and 14 CIDG killed. U.S. Special Forces left Mai Loc in late August 1970.

Other units based at Mai Loc included:

- 8th Battalion, 4th Artillery

On 2 April 1972 the 147th Marine Brigade abandoned Mai Loc in the face of the PAVN assault on Quảng Trị.
