= Trấn Bình đài =

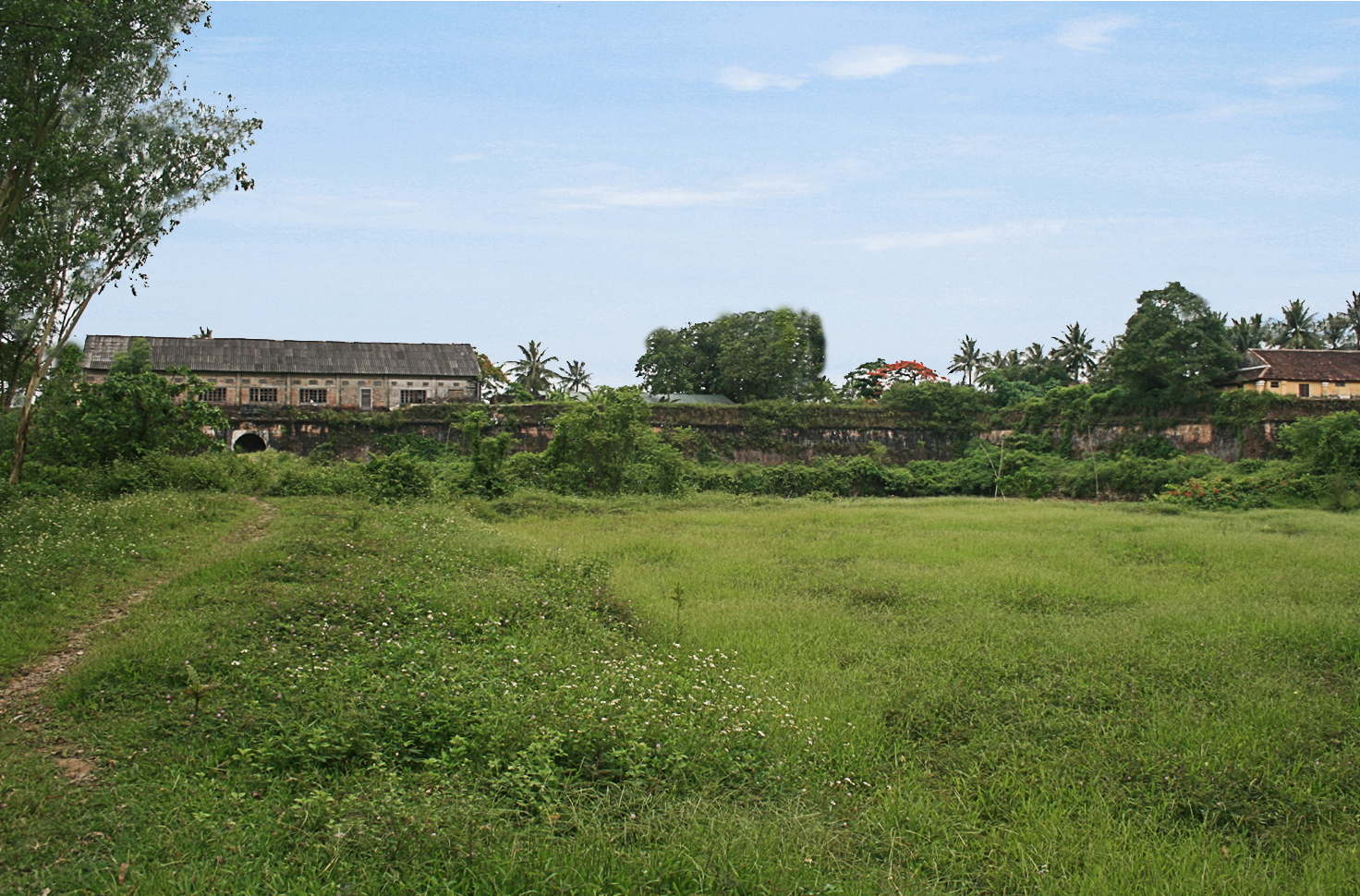

Site information
- Type: Army
- Controlled by: People's Army of Vietnam

Location
- Coordinates: 16°29′20″N 107°34′39″E

Site history
- Built: 1804
- In use: 1804-present
- Battles/wars: Vietnam War; Battle of Huế

Garrison information
- Occupants: 1st Division

The Trấn Bình đài, also called Mang Cá Garrison (Vietnamese: đồn Mang Cá), is a small fortress on the northeast corner of the Imperial City, Huế.

== History ==
Constructed during the Nguyen dynasty, it was designed to control movement on the Perfume River. Another fortress, Trấn Hải Thành, was constructed in 1813 to protect the capital against assault from the sea.

The fortress follows the French military engineer Vauban's typical layout, and has 21 canon emplacements.

During the Vietnam War the Mang Ca Garrison and the surrounding area served as the headquarters for the Army of the Republic of Vietnam (ARVN) 1st Division. During the Battle of Huế in February 1968, People's Army of Vietnam (PAVN) forces attempted to overrun the base, but were held back by an ad hoc force of 1st Division troops. The Garrison was reinforced and subsequently used as a base for ARVN and U.S. Marine forces to eject the PAVN from the Citadel.

The base was abandoned by the ARVN on 23 March 1975 as part of the withdrawal to Danang in the face of the PAVN's Hue–Da Nang Campaign. The base remains in use by the PAVN.
