= Battle of Binh Gia =

Part of the Vietnam War (1964–1965)

Battle of Bình Giã
- Part of the Vietnam War
- VC drawing depicting the Bình Gia campaign
Date	28 December 1964 – 1 January 1965
Location	Bình Giã, Phước Tuy province, South Vietnam 10°39′N 107°17′E
Result	VC/PAVN victory

Belligerents
South Vietnam; United States	Viet Cong; North Vietnam

Commanders and leaders
(South Vietnam) Nguyễn Văn Nho †; (United States) Franklin P. Eller	Trần Đình Xu; Nguyễn Thế Truyện; Tạ Minh Khâm

Units involved
(South Vietnam) Marine Division: 4th Marine Battalion; (South Vietnam) ARVN Rangers: 30th Ranger Battalion; 33rd Ranger Battalion; 35th Ranger Battalion; 38th Ranger Battalion; (South Vietnam) Support: Two artillery platoons; Section of M-24 tanks; Aerial support: (United States) 68th Assault Helicopter Company	271st Regiment (aka 1st regiment, or Q761) 272nd Regiment (aka 2nd regiment, or Q762) 80th Artillery Detachment (U80 Biên Hòa) Military Region 7: 500th Battalion; 800th Battalion; Bà Rịa Command; 440th Company; 445th Company; Military Region 6: 186th Battalion; 514th Battalion

Strength
4,300	Estimated at 1,800

Casualties and losses
201 killed; 192 wounded; 68 missing; VC claim: 1,783 killed and 300 captured	At least 32 killed

The Battle of Bình Giã (Vietnamese: Trận Bình Giã) was conducted by the Viet Cong (VC) and People's Army of Vietnam (PAVN) from 28 December 1964, to 1 January 1965, during the Vietnam War in Bình Giã, Phước Tuy province (now part of Bà Rịa–Vũng Tàu province), South Vietnam.

1964 marked a decisive turning point in the Vietnam War. Following the ousting of President Ngô Đình Diệm in 1963, South Vietnam's top army generals continued to vie with each other for control of the country's military-dominated government instead of combating the emerging forces of the VC. The fragility of the South Vietnamese government was reflected on the battlefield, where its military experienced great setbacks against the VC. Taking advantage of Saigon's political instability, leaders in Hanoi began preparing for war. Even though key members of North Vietnam's Politburo disagreed on the best strategy to reunite their country, they ultimately went ahead to prepare for armed struggle against the South Vietnam government and their American allies.

Towards the end of 1964, the VC commenced a series of large-scale military operations against the Army of the Republic of Vietnam (ARVN). As part of their Winter-Spring Offensive, two VC Regiments attacked ARVN forces at Bình Giã, fighting a large set-piece battle for the first time. Over a period of four days, the VC held their ground and mauled the best units the ARVN could send against them before withdrawing.

== Background ==
In 1964, the political establishment in South Vietnam was still in turmoil. Following the coup that ousted Diệm, the military situation quickly worsened as the VC gained significant ground in the countryside because the Military Revolutionary Council which governed South Vietnam lacked direction both in terms of policy and planning, and lacked political support from the population. Furthermore, General Dương Văn Minh, as the Chairman of the Military Revolutionary Council, and his civilian Prime Minister Nguyễn Ngọc Thơ favoured a political resolution instead of using military force, which brought them into conflict with the United States over the best strategy to fight the VC in South Vietnam. As a result, both men became increasingly unpopular among the military generals who held real political power in Saigon. On 30 January 1964, General Nguyễn Khánh successfully ousted Minh from the Military Revolutionary Council without firing a single shot. For much of the year, Khánh spent most of his efforts on consolidating political power, instead of fighting the VC.

In contrast to the political unrest in Saigon, the Communist leadership in North Vietnam and in the VC were far more concerned about the best strategy to fight the South Vietnamese government and the Americans. While all leaders in Hanoi and in the VC shared the same goal of eventual reunification of their homeland, different factions within the Communist Party disagreed on the best method to achieve their desired goal. Members of North Vietnam's Politburo were divided by the issues surrounding the Soviet strategy of peaceful co-existence versus the Chinese strategy of supporting national liberation movements in emerging countries. Despite their differences of opinion, the Communist Party leadership ultimately made preparations for armed struggle in South Vietnam. From Hanoi's perspective, the military regime in Saigon was able to hold out because the Communist main forces were still not ready to fight a conventional war, so North Vietnam needed to focus on the development of its military force in the shortest period of time. In the meantime, however, the war needed to be kept at its current level in order to prevent the full involvement of the United States military.

On 11 October 1964, the VC was ordered to carry out a series of military operations as part of the Communist winter-spring offensive. The VC Nam Bo (B-2 Front in Mekong Delta) Regional Command established a sub-command under the leadership of Trần Đình Xu, with Nguyễn Hòa as the deputy commander, and Lê Trọng Tấn as the political commissar. Their mission was to inflict damage on the regular units of the ARVN and destroy the strategic hamlets constructed by the former Diệm regime. The VC identified the regions of Bình Long-Phước Long and Bà Rịa-Long Khánh, along Route 14, as the main targets for their offensive. Meanwhile, the Central Military Commission in Hanoi appointed General Nguyễn Chí Thanh as the commander of North Vietnamese military operations in southern Vietnam. Other high-ranking officers such as Major Generals Lê Trọng Tấn and Trần Độ, and Colonel Hoàng Cầm were sent to South Vietnam to supervise the military build-up that would commence in November 1964.

== Prelude ==
In July 1964, the VC 271st Regiment and 272nd Regiment began moving into the provinces of Bình Dương, Bình Long and Phước Long to carry out their mission. During the first phase of their campaign, the VC regiments overran several strategic hamlets at Xan Sang, Cam Xe, Dong Xa, and Thai Khai. Between August and September 1964, VC regiments executed deep thrusts into Bình Dương and Châu Thành to apply additional pressure on South Vietnamese outposts situated on Route 14. During the second phase of their campaign, the VC ambushed two ARVN infantry companies and destroyed five armoured vehicles, which consisted of M24 Chaffee light tanks and M113 armored personnel carriers. The VC defeated regular ARVN units at the strategic hamlets of Bình Mỹ and Bình Co.

Colonel Ta Minh Kham (second from left), commander of the Viet Cong 272nd Regiment, with other high-ranking VC officers

Following the completion of the initial stages in their campaign, the VC forces were ordered to regroup and prepare for the next offensive in the Long Khánh region. VC soldiers from the two regiments were assembled in War Zone D, where they were trained to attack well-fortified enemy strongholds. On 20 November 1964, the VC reached the Long Khánh battlefield, having completed a 200 km march from War Zone D. On the battlefield the VC 186th Battalion (from Military Region 6), the 500th and 800th Battalions (from Military Region 7), and the 445th Company also joined the offensive. To kick-start their offensive in the Ba Ria-Long Khánh region, the VC selected Bình Giã as their next target. Bình Giã was a small village located in Phước Tuy Province, about 67 km from Saigon.

In 1964 about 6,000 people lived in Bình Giã, most of whom were staunchly anti-communist. The inhabitants of Bình Giã were Roman Catholic refugees who had fled from North Vietnam in 1954 during Operation Passage to Freedom because of fears of Communist persecution. To prepare for their main battle, the VC 272nd Regiment was ordered to block Inter-provincial Road No. 2 and 15, and destroy any South Vietnamese units attempting to reach Bình Giã from the south-western flank of the battlefield. In the days leading up to the battle, the VC often came out to harass the local militia forces.

On the night of 4-5 December a VC local force company attacked Binh Gia as elements of the 1st Regiment probed Duc Thanh District headquarters several kilometers away. By dawn on the 5th, the VC had only been able to occupy part of Binh Gia because of stubborn resistance. The ARVN then staged a relief effort. A ranger company marched unimpeded by road to the hamlet. Americans speculated that the VC had decided not to ambush it in the hopes of snaring bigger prey to follow. Instead of sending more troops by road, however, US Army helicopters delivered the rest of the 38th Ranger Battalion by air, avoiding the ambush the 2nd Regiment set for it. After linking up with the first company, the Rangers recaptured Binh Gia, losing seven dead, 14 wounded, and five missing. The VC left behind 23 bodies.

On the night of 7-8 December, two VC companies attacked Binh Gia again, while two battalions attacked Đất Đỏ district headquarters and VC artillery bombarded Xuyen Moc and Duc Thanh District headquarters and the CIDG camp at Van Kiep. The bombardments proved inconsequential, and Binh Gia held. At Đất Đỏ, 54 territorial soldiers and an armored car repulsed four ground attacks with the help of fighter-bombers.

On 9 December III Corps responded to the expanding threat by sending a troop of M113s to clear Highway 2 between Duc Thanh and Binh Gia. The VVC 2nd Regiment had been waiting for four days for such a move. It assaulted the convoy where the road passed through a rubber plantation, about 12km north of Phuoc Tuy’s capital of Baria. The engagement began when a mine exploded under the lead M113, knocking it out and killing the troop commander. The VC then opened fire from one side of the road. The troop responded by turning off the road and moving in between rows of rubber trees toward the enemy. The tree rows permitted forward and backward movement but hindered any other kind of maneuver. As the carriers advanced, VC recoilless rifles posted on the opposite side of the road fired into the carriers’ rear. VC soldiers then rushed forward to deploy demolition charges and to throw grenades into vehicle openings. The fighting was fierce. Nine U.S. Army gunships arrived within 15 minutes of the start of the ambush, firing in support and marking targets for 14 fighter-bomber sorties. After about an hour, eight of the 14 M113s succeeded in disengaging. At 21:00, the surviving carriers linked up with a Ranger company delivered by U.S. Army helicopters and they advanced to recover the wounded, but the VC blocked the attempt. The ambush destroyed six M113s, six 3.5-inch rocket launchers, one 81mm mortar, and one .50-caliber machine gun. The VC captured two .50-caliber machine guns, five .30-caliber machine guns, two Browning Automatic Rifles, and 24 small arms. The ARVN lost 12 dead, 31 wounded, and ten missing. The VC left behind one dead and one weapon, with the allies estimating that they had evacuated another 100 casualties. The VC claim that the 272nd Regiment destroyed the entire unit including 16 M113s.

Over the next two days, the ARVN probed the ambush site and a nearby mangrove swamp where they thought the enemy might be hiding, with no results.

On 17 December VC soldiers wearing ranger uniforms and red berets ambushed a convoy near Long Hai, Phuoc Tuy, killing four, wounding three, and destroying an armored car and a truck. They damaged another armored car and truck and captured a machine gun and 29 weapons. Twenty-one ARVN troops went missing. The VC claim that the 272nd Regiment destroyed six armored vehicles.

== Battle ==
At 04:45 on 28 December 1964, while mortars and recoilless rifle fire hit Duc Thanh Post, elements of the VC 271st Regiment and the 445th Company penetrated Bình Giã's eastern perimeter. There, they clashed with members of the South Vietnamese Popular Force militiamen, which numbered about 65 personnel. The militia fighters proved no match for the VC and their overwhelming firepower, so they quickly retreated into underground bunkers, and called for help. Once the village was captured, Colonel Ta Minh Kham, the VC regimental commander, established his command post in the main village church and waited for fresh reinforcements, which came in the form of heavy mortars, machine guns and recoilless rifles. To counter South Vietnamese helicopter assaults, Kham's troops set up a network of defensive fortifications around the village, with trenches and bunkers protected by land mines and barbed wire. The local Catholic priest, who was also the village chief, sent a bicycle messenger out to the Bà Rịa district headquarters to ask for a relief force.

On 29 December two companies of the ARVN 33rd Ranger Battalion and a company from the 30th Ranger Battalion were airlifted into area located west of Bình Giã, by helicopters from the U.S. 118th Aviation Company to face a VC force of unknown size. As soon as the rangers arrived at the landing zone, they were quickly overwhelmed by the VC in a deadly ambush. The entire 30th Ranger Battalion was then committed to join the attack, but they too did not initially succeed in penetrating the strong VC defensive lines. Several more companies of the Rangers then arrived for an attack from multiple directions. Two companies of the 33rd Ranger Battalion advanced from the northeast. One of them came to the outskirts of the village, but was unable to break through the VC defenses. The other one, trying to outflank the enemy, had been lured into a kill zone in open terrain and were quickly obliterated in an ambush by the three VC battalions using heavy weapons. The two companies suffered a 70 percent casualty rate, and survivors were forced to retreat to the nearby Catholic church. The 30th Rangers had more success by assaulting from the western direction and succeeded in fighting their way into the village, aided by local residents. It however also suffered heavy losses, with the battalion commander and his American adviser severely wounded. The local civilians in Bình Giã retrieved weapons and ammunition from the dead Rangers, and hid the wounded government soldiers from the VC. The 38th Ranger Battalion, on the other hand, landed on the battlefield unopposed by the VC, and they immediately advanced on Bình Giã from the south. Soldiers from the 38th Rangers spent the whole day fighting, but they could not break through the VC defences to link up with the survivors hiding in the church, and fell back after calling in mortar fire to decimate VC fighters moving to encircle them.

On the morning of 30 December the South Vietnamese 4th Marine Battalion was flown by helicopters into Binh Gia. The 1/4th Marine Battalion was the first unit to arrive on the outskirts of Bình Giã, but the 1st Company commander decided to secure the landing zone, to wait for the rest of the battalion to arrive instead of moving on to their objective. After the rest of the battalion had arrived, they marched towards the Catholic church to relieve the besieged Rangers. About one and a half hours later, the 4th Marine Battalion linked up with the 30th, 33rd and 38th Ranger Battalions, as the VC began withdrawing to the northeast. That afternoon the 4th Marine Battalion swept the village, but the VC was nowhere to be seen, as all their units had withdrawn from the village during the previous night, linking with other VC elements in the forest to attack the government relief forces. On the evening of 30 December, the VC returned to Bình Giã and attacked from the south-eastern perimeter of the village. The local villagers, who discovered the approaching VC, immediately sounded the alarm to alert the ARVN soldiers defending the village. The South Vietnamese were able to repel the VC, with support from U.S. Army helicopter gunships flown out from Vung Tau Air Base. While pursuing the VC, a helicopter gunship from the U.S. 68th Assault Helicopter Company was shot down and crashed in the Quảng Giao rubber plantation, about 4 km from Bình Giã, killing four of its crewmen.

On 31 December the 4th Marine Battalion was ordered to locate the crashed helicopter and recover the bodies of the dead American crewmen. Acting against the advice of his American advisor, Major Nguyễn Văn Nho, commander of the 4th Marine Battalion, sent his 2/4th Marine Battalion company out to the Quảng Giao rubber plantation. Unknown to the 4th Marine Battalion, the VC 271st Regiment had assembled in the plantation. About one hour after they had departed from Bình Giã, the commander of the 2/4th Marine Battalion reported via radio that his troops had found the helicopter wreckage, and the bodies of four American crewmen. Shortly afterwards, the VC opened fire and the 2/4th Marine Battalion was forced to pull back. In an attempt to save the 2nd Company, the entire 4th Marine Battalion was sent out to confront the VC. As the lead element of the 4th Marine Battalion closed in on the Quảng Giao plantation, they were hit by accurate VC artillery fire, which was soon followed by repeated human wave attacks. Having absorbed heavy casualties from the VC's ambush, the 2/4th Marine Battalion had to fight their way out of the plantation with their bayonets fixed. During the entire ordeal, the company did not receive artillery support because the plantation was beyond the range of 105mm artillery guns based in Phước Tuy and Bà Rịa. They however escaped with the crucial support of the U.S. aircraft and helicopters whose rocket attacks forced the VC to pull back and halted their attempt at pursuit.

Later on 31 December, three companies of the 4th Marine Battalion returned to the crash site by 15:15 and the American graves were located and their corpses were dug up. A single U.S. helicopter evacuated the bodies of the four American crewmen, while South Vietnamese casualties were forced to wait for another helicopter to arrive. At 16:30 three VC battalions, with artillery support, suddenly attacked the Marine company at the crash site. The battalion's commanding and executive officers were immediately killed and air support was not available and the company was overrun. The other two Marine companies at a nearby road junction was also attacked, but managed to fight their way back to Bình Giã. The 4th Marine Battalion lost 122 killed, including Major Nho and 28 other officers, 71 wounded and several captured, including advisor Captain Donald Cook.

On 1 January three battalions of ARVN Airborne reinforcements arrived, they were too late as most of the VC had already withdrawn from the battlefield.

On 1 and 3 January 1965, the 2nd Regiment destroyed convoys of ten and 16 vehicles respectively. In between those two actions, at dusk on 2 January, the regiment attacked an understrength Regional Forces battalion and a tank troop that guarded the road between Binh Gia and Baria. It used rocket-propelled grenades and recoilless rifles to hit the M24 tanks. A second tank troop tried to assist, but two burning tanks blocked the road and rubber trees bordering the thoroughfare made it impossible to advance in the darkness. The battle raged through the night. Dawn revealed 20 ARVN casualties and four tanks and an M113 damaged or destroyed. After these series of engagements, the B–2 Front recalled its two main force regiments. The South Vietnamese made a futile attempt to intercept them, uncovering in the process a large tunnel complex.

== Aftermath ==
The battle of Bình Giã reflected the VC's growing military strength and influence, especially in the Mekong Delta region. It was the first time the VC had launched a large-scale operation, holding its ground and fighting for four days against government troops equipped with armor, artillery and helicopters, and aided by U.S. air support and military advisers. The VC demonstrated that, when well-supplied with military supplies from North Vietnam, they had the ability to fight and inflict damage even on the best ARVN units.

The VC claimed that the operation had resulted in the destruction of two government battalions - the 33rd Rangers and 4th Marines, along with an armored cavalry troop and several smaller elements. They also claimed they had killed 1,731 South Vietnamese and 52 Americans, and captured 297 South Vietnamese and three Americans. They reported allied materiel losses as 35 helicopters, one L-19, two A-1s, 22 M113s, 5 M24s, 18 trucks, 2 jeeps, 611 weapons, and 50,000 rounds of ammunition. Finally, the VC asserted that they had gained control of more than 20,000 people. VC authors acknowledge that their own "casualties were high."

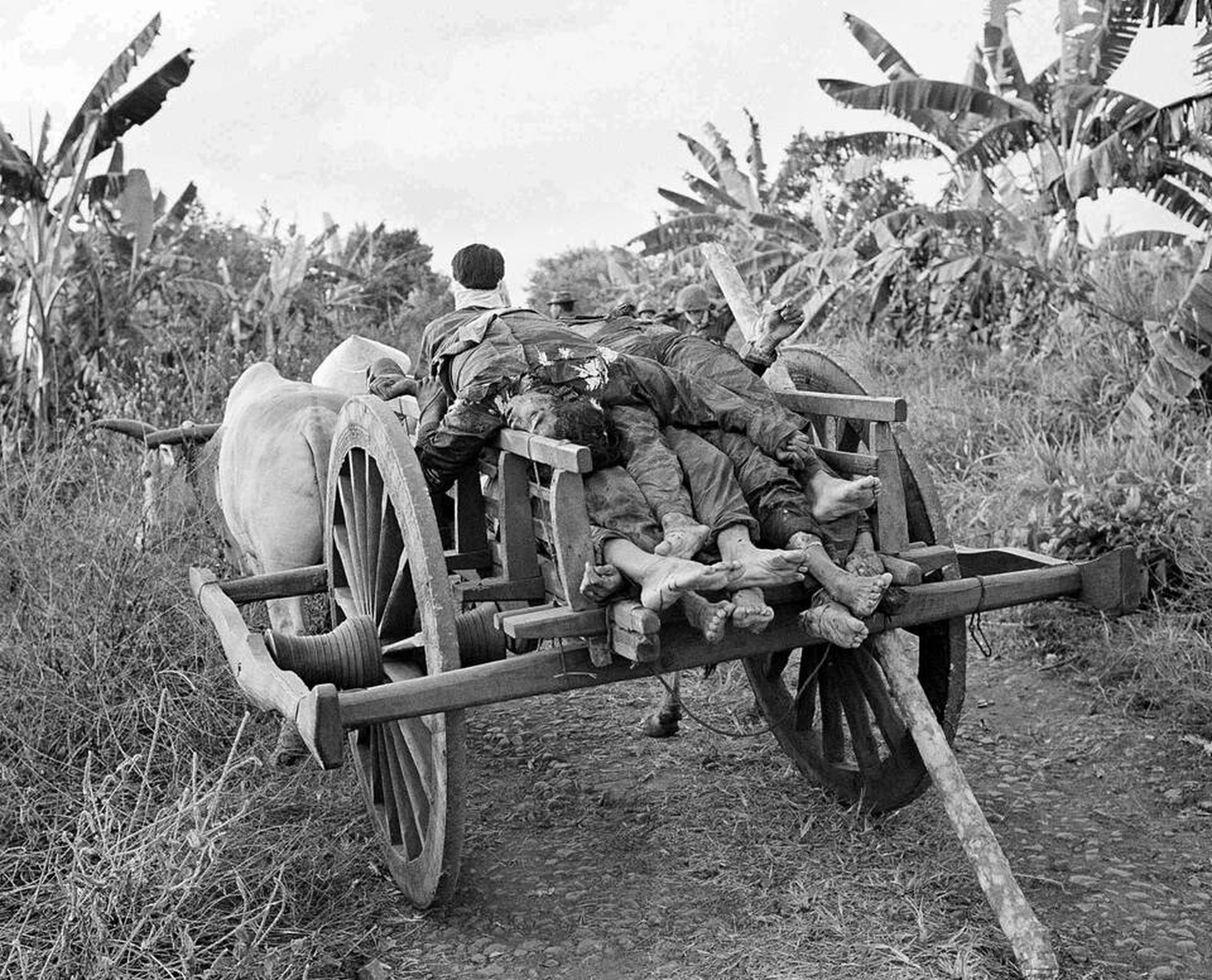
South Vietnamese dead are removed from the battlefield

The allies' recounting of the carnage was far smaller, but bad enough. MACV reported that between 28 December and 6 January, the allies lost 201 killed, 192 wounded, and 68 missing. The American portion of these losses was five dead, eight wounded, and three missing or captured. Other losses included two M113s destroyed, four helicopters shot down, four M24 tanks damaged, and nine crew and 231 individual weapons lost. Adding these numbers to the losses suffered before 28 December, including the defeat of an armored troop on 9 December and many small engagements between territorials and insurgents around hamlets, would raise the total, though it would still be much lower than the VC accounting. That the government lost influence in the surrounding countryside was undeniable. Perhaps the only place where the government did not lose influence was Binh Gia itself. The strongly pro-government community emerged from its ordeal remarkably unscathed, with its morale high and its hatred for the VC as strong as ever.

In recognition of the 271st Regiment's performance during the Bình Giã campaign, the VC High Command bestowed the title 'Bình Giã Regiment' on the unit to honour their achievement. Following the Bình Giã campaign, the VC went on to occupy Hoài Đức District and the strategic hamlets of Đất Đỏ, Long Thành and Nhơn Trạch along Inter-provincial Road No. 2 and 15. They also expanded the Hát Dịch base area, which was located in Bà Rịa and Bình Thuận Provinces, to protect the important sea transportation routes used by the Vietnam People's Navy to supply VC units around the regions of the Mekong River.

At that stage of the war, Bình Giã was the worst defeat experienced by the South Vietnamese. Despite their losses, the ARVN considered the battle as their victory and erected a monument at the site of the battle to acknowledge the sacrifices of the soldiers who had fallen to retake Bình Giã.

Several factors contributed to the outcome. Political turmoil in Saigon had diverted the attention of both Khanh and the Joint General Staff. They had ignored MACV's warnings about the unfolding offensive and had committed troops piecemeal into a maelstrom. The VC's careful selection of the battlefield worsened the predicament. The region had few roads, and those that existed were vulnerable to ambush as they passed through many wooded areas. The ambush threat had led the allies to deploy reinforcements largely by helicopter, but this too had its disadvantages. The extensive rubber plantations meant that there were relatively few landing sites available for helicopters. Those that were accessible, the VC had carefully prepared in advance. Moreover, helicopters were not always available to move entire units at once, leading to drawn out deployments that denied the allies the advantages of shock and surprise. Together, these factors exacerbated the government’s disjointed deployments to the VC's advantage. Binh Gia was also out of artillery range, and MACV criticized the South Vietnamese for not moving artillery into the area during the campaign. It also criticized them for not using enough airpower to bombard landing zones before airmobile assaults. Insufficient use of fighter-bombers during combat had also imperiled the ground troops, as dense foliage and well-prepared entrenchments had limited the effectiveness of the weapons carried by U.S. Army UH-1 gunships. The VC had further minimized their losses to air power by "clinging to the enemy's belts." The rangers and marines had fought bravely, but the high command had failed them.

== Order of battle ==
=== Viet Cong ===
- Main forces of B2 Front: 271st Regiment, 272nd Regiment (were called the 1st Regiment, 2nd Regiment or Q761, Q762 respectively in PAVN docs and became part of the 9th Division on 2 Sep 1965), 80th Artillery Detachment.
- Main forces of Military Region 6, 7, 8: 186th Battalion, 500th Battalion, 800th Battalion, 514th Battalion
- Local forces of Military Region 7: 440th Company, 445th Company

=== Army of the Republic of Vietnam ===
- Marine Division: 4th Marine Battalion
- ARVN Rangers: 30th Ranger Battalion, 33rd Ranger Battalion, 38th Ranger Battalion, 35th Ranger Battalion
- ARVN Artillery and Armored Cavalry support: two artillery platoons, and one section of M-24 tanks.
- U.S. Army Aerial support: 68th Assault Helicopter Company
