= Battle of Trung Nghia =

Part of the Vietnam War (1973)

- Part of the Vietnam War
Date	8 June – 16 September 1973
Location	Trung Nghia, South Vietnam 14.382°N 107.896°E
Result	South Vietnamese victory

Belligerents
South Vietnam	North Vietnam

Commanders and leaders
General Nguyễn Văn Toàn	

Units involved
42nd Regiment, 22nd Division; 44th Regiment, 23rd Division; 53rd Regiment, 23rd Division	24th Independent Regiment; 28th Regiment, 10th Division; 66th Regiment, 10th Division; 95B Regiment, 10th Division; 28th Reconnaissance-Sapper Battalion

Casualties and losses
	30 percent

The Battle of Trung Nghia took place from 8 June to 16 September 1973 when North Vietnamese forces captured the village of Trung Nghia in the Central Highlands of South Vietnam. The North Vietnamese were eventually forced out by the South Vietnamese.

== Background ==
At the beginning of 1973 the Army of the Republic of Vietnam (ARVN)'s forward positions west of Kontum were just east of Polei Krong (14.382°N 107.874°E) and the adjacent village of Trung Nghia (14.382°N 107.896°E) near the confluence of the Dak Bla and Krong Poko rivers. The People's Army of Vietnam (PAVN) had attacked Polei Krong and Trung Nghia on 27 January during the War of the flags campaign, capturing Polei Krong the next day. The PAVN still occupied Polel Krong, which it appeared determined to hold, not only to provide a good point of departure for an attack on Kontum, but also because Polei Krong was astride one of the best north-south lines of communication.

In mid-May, Republic of Vietnam Air Force (RVNAF) aerial observers saw two PAVN 130 mm guns being moved into position northwest of Kontum. ARVN intelligence learned of PAVN planned to use the artillery against ARVN artillery batteries in the Kontum area. Shortly afterwards heavy attacks by fire hit the ARVN firebases and positions of the 53rd Infantry Regiment, 23rd Division, northwest of Kontum. Two PAVN ground attacks against Doi Oa Cham were repulsed. Artillery bombardments by the PAVN's 40th Artillery Regiment, employing 130 mm guns and 122 mm rocket fire, continued against forward ARVN positions and artillery batteries during the first week of June, while elements of the PAVN 10th Division conducted ground probes against three forward ARVN positions.

== Battle ==
On 7 June, a major attack by battalions of the 66th Regiment, 10th Division and the 24th Independent Regiment, supported by at least 10 T-54 tanks and by fire from 130 mm guns and 122 mm rockets struck ARVN positions at Trung Nghia and Polei Krang. The attack drove a Regional Force battalion and elements of the ARVN 44th Regiment, 23rd Division from their positions, giving the PAVN control of positions 17 km west of Kontum.

The ARVN immediately tried to retake the position and casualties mounted on both sides as successive attempts failed to dislodge the entrenched PAVN, who enjoyed the advantage of observation from the heights of Ngoc Bay Mountain. In early July, the 44th Regiment gained a few meters and dug in on the eastern edge of the village of Ngoc Bay, but could move no further despite the employment of massive artillery preparations and air strikes.

Stalled in the attempt to take Trung Nghia by frontal assault, II Corps commander General Nguyễn Văn Toàn determined that an approach from the south against the positions at Plei Djo Drap, directly across the Dak Bla River from Trung Nghia, would strike the PAVN defenses in the flank and force a withdrawal. Toàn therefore directed the 23rd Division, reinforced with Rangers, to attack north from the base at Plei Mrong.

The southwest monsoon, in full force over the western highlands of Pleiku and Kontum Provinces in early August, allowed the PAVN to maneuver in daylight since RVNAF aerial observation was spotty and artillery and air strikes consequently much less effective. Plei Mrong (14.157°N 107.884°E) and its camp, called Ly Thai Loi, were situated on Provincial Route 3B south of the Yali Falls of the Krong Bolah and the PAVN concentration around Plei Monoun. The ARVN move north caused activity to pick up during the week of 4–10 August when the PAVN 28th Reconnaissance-Sapper Battalion launched seven separate attempts to take the camp, supported by 75 mm and 130 mm gunfire. ARVN Ranger units in the field north and south of the camp also came under attack. A few days later a battalion of the 95B Regiment, 10th Division, hit the ARVN 22nd Ranger Border Defense Battalion at Doi Ba Cham, just north of Plei Mrong, but was repelled, leaving 150 dead on the battlefield. Meanwhile, the ARVN 45th Regiment, 23rd Division, advancing in the Plei Monoun area to the Krong Bolah River, encountered other elements of the 95B Regiment. Combat with the 95B Regiment continued throughout the month in the Plei Mrong sector, and its losses were estimated to approach 200 killed. Despite these losses, the 95B was successful in preventing the ARVN from closing on the Dak Bla River.

The PAVN was nevertheless suffering from the bombardment at Trung Nghia. Damage to the PAVN 24B Regiment was so severe that it was withdrawn to the Đắk Tô area for recuperation and replaced by elements of the 66th and 28th Regiments, 10th Division. The 28th Regiment, recently strengthened by replacements from the North, took up the defense of Trung Nghia, while the 66th held Plei Djo Drap. Meanwhile, the exhausted ARVN 44th Regiment was replaced in the attack by the 42nd Regiment, 22nd Division, flown to Kontum in C-130s from Bình Định Province. This fresh regiment, and a small but important change in tactics, made the difference. Rather than engage in large infantry assaults, the 42nd methodically eliminated PAVN bunkers one by one, using platoon-sized assaults supported by 81 mm mortars firing delayed-fuze rounds which blew away overhead cover and killed or exposed the occupants. Prisoners later attested to the effectiveness of these techniques.

On 1 September 1973, the 42nd Regiment began the final assault on Trung Nghia, advancing cautiously to find that except for a few isolated riflemen the PAVN had withdrawn. The PAVN 28th Regiment, depleted by casualties and malaria, limped north along the Poko River. Some of its wounded, left behind and captured, revealed that PAVN forces defending Trung Nghia had suffered losses of 30 percent on the whole, and that in some units with considerable sickness casualty rates were as high as 60 percent. On the other hand, the 42nd's casualties were light. While the 42nd Regiment entered Trung Nghia, the 53rd Regiment, 23rd Division, advanced along the south bank of the Dak Bla River and occupied Plei Djo Drap, vacated by the withdrawing PAVN 66th Regiment, which crossed the river to recuperate.

== Aftermath ==
Trung Nghia was cleared of all PAVN by 7 September, and the 42nd Regiment entered Polei Krong on 16 September. During the rest of the month, mopping-up operations cleared PAVN remnants from the slopes of Ngoc Bay Mountain, while skirmishing between the ARVN Rangers and elements of the 95B Regiment continued around Plei Mrong.
