= 23rd Division (South Vietnam) =

Division of the Army of the Republic of Vietnam

- Sư đoàn 23
- 23rd Division Insignia
- Active: 1959 - 1975
- Country: South Vietnam
- Branch: Army of the Republic of Vietnam
- Part of: II Corps
- Garrison/HQ: Pleiku
- Engagements: Vietnam War: Operation Byrd; Operation Francis Marion; Phase III Offensive; Battle of Duc Lap; Battle of Kontum; War of the flags; Battle of Trung Nghia; Battle of Quang Duc; Battle of Ban Me Thuot

Commanders
- Notable commanders: Hoàng Xuân Lãm; Lữ Mộng Lan; Nguyễn Văn Mạnh; Vo Vanh Canh; Lý Tòng Bá; Le Trung Tuong; Trương Quang Ân †

The 23rd Division (Vietnamese: Sư đoàn 23) of the Army of the Republic of Vietnam (ARVN)—the army of the nation state of South Vietnam that existed from 1955 to 1975—was part of the II Corps that oversaw the Central Highlands.

== History ==
In 1960 the 23rd Infantry Division was formed from the 15th Light Division and elements of the 16th Light Division.

=== 1964 ===
From 3 to 20 March Division commander Colonel Hoàng Xuân Lãm launched Operation Vi Dan 103 in southern Phú Yên province. After minimal consultation with his senior US military advisor, Lãm used three infantry and two ranger battalions, four artillery batteries, three Civil Guard companies, and two mechanized troops to first surround and then to penetrate the targeted area. Once inside, the penetration units broke down into companies and combed the area with patrols and ambushes. In addition to hunting the Vietcong (VC), the soldiers destroyed supplies and evacuated the Montagnard population. On two occasions, ARVN troops allowed a cornered enemy to escape. In one episode, the 21st Ranger Battalion reported that it had destroyed the VC when it had not even attacked him. The operation killed 24 VC, captured eight, and took in 31 suspects for the loss of six killed and 32 wounded.

From 23 July to 2 August the Division conducted Operation Vi Dan 109 in Phú Yên province resulting in 51 VC killed, two captured and 17 weapons captured for the loss of one ARVN killed.

On 19 August the Division sent two infantry battalions, one Ranger company, two Regional Forces companies and an armored cavalry troop into Phu Yen's Giang River Valley to look for an estimated 500 VC. The ARVN killed 56 VC and estimated it had inflicted 74 more casualties, while capturing nine prisoners and three weapons. ARVN losses were 18 killed and 45 wounded.

From 8 November to 31 December the 23rd Ranger Battalion, two battalions of the 44th Infantry, and territorial forces combed Phú Yên province. By year's end, they had killed 119 VC and captured 13 VC, 29 suspects, and 15 weapons. ARVN losses were 73 dead, 106 wounded, 43 missing, and 45 weapons lost.

=== 1965 ===
On 28 January the Division launched an operation to clear the VC held hamlet of Phu Lac, 14km southeast of Tuy Hòa. Two battalions of the 44th Infantry, the Division reconnaissance company, a troop of M113 armored personnel carriers and some territorials launched the attack but were stopped by VC fire. US and REpublidc of Vietnam Air Force (RVNAF) airstrikes followed and then US helicopters dropped CS powder on the VC positions. The ARVN delayed their advance allowing the CS to disperse and the VC to regroup and they held back seven successive assaults before evacuating by boat at nightfall. The following day the ARVN found 85 VC dead and captured six VC, two light machine guns, six individual weapons, and ten suspects. Civilians reported seeing 60 VC bodies being evacuated by sampans. ARVN losses were seven dead and 14 wounded.

On 3 September 1965 over 500 VC overran four hamlets in Nghĩa Hành district, Quảng Ngãi province. In reaction, the ARVN deployed three Regional Forces companies and five Popular Forces platoons north and south of the area, while the 1st Battalion, 45th Infantry, backed by a scout company and a platoon each of M113s and 105mm howitzers, advanced from east to west. The attack bogged down as troops tried to cross 700 meters of open ground. As reinforcements arrived, the VC withdrew into the northern blocking force where another fight occurred. The VC lost 79 killed and two captured, one 57mm recoilless rifle, three automatic rifles, and 18 other weapons. ARVN losses were 14 killed and 27 wounded.

On 29 July, as a show of force, United Front for the Liberation of Oppressed Races (FULRO) troops seized a Highland Civilian Irregular Defense Group (CIDG) border camp at Buon Brieng in Darlac Province, withdrawing several days later with 176 CIDG personnel. When elements of the division reoccupied the camp, and forced several hundred FULRO supporters to join local Regional Forces units, tensions increased further. In mid-December FULRO launched a series of coordinated attacks in the Highland Provinces of Quang Duc and Phu Bon, seizing a province headquarters and killing 32 ARVN troops before government forces, including an Airborne battalion flown in, restored order. The incidents were more a demonstration than a genuine revolt, and after the initial attacks, FULRO military activity subsided.

=== 1966-1967 ===
In 1966 the Division, which previously had only two infantry regiments, added a third regiment.

From 25 August 1966 to 1 December 1967 the Division's 44th Regiment participated in Operation Byrd with the US 2nd Battalion, 7th Cavalry Regiment in Bình Thuận Province, over the course of the operation the regiment lost 41 killed while total VC losses were 913 killed.

From 6 April to 11 October 1967 the division participated in Operation Francis Marion with the US 4th Infantry Division and 173rd Airborne Brigade against People's Army of Vietnam (PAVN) base areas in Pleiku, Darlac and the Kon Tum Provinces. Total PAVN losses were 1600 killed.

=== 1968 ===
An assessment in early 1968 found that the Division, based in the remote interior, was regarded as a "backwater" and could not seem to attract good officers resulting in poor quality regimental and battalion-level commanders. General Vo Vanh Canh assumed command of the Division in 1968 after his predecessor was killed.

In mid-1968, encouraged by the apparent success of joint operations with the 22nd Division, I Field Force, Vietnam commander General William R. Peers ordered the US 4th Infantry Division to support the 24th Special Tactical Zone (with the three-battalion 42nd Infantry Regiment) and the Division in the Ban Me Thuot area. Peers also directed the organization of a Task Force South with two battalions of the 173rd Airborne Brigade "pairing up" these units with several Ranger battalions and the 44th and 53rd Regiments of the Division south of Bình Định. The success of the program varied greatly from unit to unit. In the interior Highlands the pair-off program of the US 4th Division was undeveloped as they remained focussed on large anti-guerrilla operations and while operations were conducted on a coordinated basis, they were rarely combined or integrated. In the coastal region, the programs of the 173rd and Task Force South were more effective.

On 20 August 1968 during the Phase III Offensive a battalion from the PAVN 24th Regiment assaulted a Division firebase on Highway 14 22 km north of Pleiku. The defenders repelled the assault killing 87 PAVN for the loss of 9 ARVN dead.

On 24 August 1968 the 2nd Battalion, 45th Regiment was flown into Duc Lap Camp to support the CIDG fighting the PAVN 66th Regiment in the Battle of Duc Lap. The 2nd Battalion together with three MIKE Force companies succeeded in repelling the PAVN assault killing over 700 PAVN.

On 8 September the division commander, Brigadier general Trương Quang Ân, his wife and an adviser and three U.S. crewmen were killed when their helicopter crashed near Duc Lap Camp.

=== 1969-1971 ===
In 1970 Brigadier general Gordon J. Duquemin, II Corps deputy senior adviser cited one battalion of the 53rd Regiment which "sat in Dalat during all of 1969 and killed only ten enemy while suffering just two of its members killed in action," a record, he pointed out, that "can hardly justify the cost of its existence." In the opinion of Duquemin, most South Vietnamese commanders "would rather avoid the enemy than ... fight him."

=== Battle of Kontum ===
On 28 April 1972 during the Battle of Kontum the division's headquarters was moved 160 km from Ban Me Thuot to Kontum to take control of all ARVN forces defending the city. The 53rd Regiment was tasked with the defense of Kontum while the 2nd and 6th Ranger Groups were deployed north of the city on Route 14 to delay the PAVN advance. In early May the 45th and 46th Regiments arrived at Kontum replacing the 2nd and 6th Ranger Groups north of the city thus improving operational control of the defenses. By mid-May the 44th Regiment was located on Route 41 4 km northwest of Kontum, the 45th Regiment defended the north of the city and the 53rd Regiment on the northeast defended Kontum Airfield.

The PAVN attacked Kontum on the morning of 14 May without the heavy artillery preparation that had been used in their previous attacks. The PAVN 48th Regiment and 203rd Tank Regiment attacked the city from the northwest, the 28th Regiment came from the north and the 64th and 141st Regiments attacked from the south. The ARVN artillery began targeting the T-54 tanks moving down Route 14. This targeting separated the supporting PAVN infantry from their tanks and allowed the ARVN tank killers to do their work. Two T-54s were destroyed by teams with M72 LAWs. The sky was overcast and tactical air support was not able to operate, however, Hawk's Claw helicopters had arrived on the scene from Camp Holloway, their helicopters and Jeeps had BGM-71 TOW missiles, which were powerful enough to penetrate a T-54. They found the PAVN tanks before they could find cover in the jungle and destroyed two more tanks. By 09:00 the attack had been stopped. The PAVN continued their rocket and artillery fire throughout the day. Then at 20:00 on the 14th, the PAVN launched a second attack, putting heavy pressure on the north, west and south. There were two B-52 strikes scheduled and they were directed against PAVN forces pressuring the 44th Regiment. The PAVN forces pulled back having suffered hundreds of casualties in the strike. On 15 May the PAVN attack continued, but the 44th held its positions assisted by tactical air support.

On the night of 16 May the PAVN pushed the 53rd Regiment from its positions and the perimeter was partially penetrated. A new B-52 strike was requested for the base of the penetration while ARVN artillery continued heavy fire to hold PAVN forces in place as the 53rd Regiment withdrew from the impact zone. The strike was delivered on schedule with devastating results as PAVN forces had massed to break the perimeter defense. The attack had been stopped and numerous tanks destroyed. The strike was decisive and the three weakened PAVN divisions regrouped in the jungle surrounding Kontum.

During the next two weeks, the ARVN and PAVN forces tested each other. The division responded to artillery attacks with their own artillery or by calling in Hawk's Claw helicopter fire. B-52 sorties were again used, however the PAVN knew not to mass troops as they had while trying to break the perimeter defense. At 03:45 on 20 May, the 53rd Regiment was attacked by the first of three all-out assaults from the north. On the third attack the 53rd was pushed from their positions. Throughout that day the 53rd tried to regain their position but the PAVN was now dug in. The division's new senior adviser and Colonel Lý Tòng Bá decided to pull up nine M41 tanks and to direct all that fire to the PAVN position along with helicopter gunships. The front was restored. Three additional assaults were made in the early morning hours. Each was pushed back after fierce hand-to-hand combat.

In the early hours of 25 May, PAVN mortar and artillery fire increased enough to indicate preparation for a major attack. In the southern quadrant, the artillery fire kept the ARVN 23rd Division in their bunkers. Under the artillery cover, the PAVN sappers, some dressed in ARVN uniforms, moved into the buildings south of Kontum Airfield. In the early morning of 26 May, the PAVN attacked the division from the north with tank/infantry teams. At first light, Hawk's Claw was able to destroy nine tanks, two machine guns, and one truck. This effectively stopped the momentum of the attack. Later in the day Ba threw a battalion of the 44th Regiment into the fight. This limited the PAVN penetration of the ARVN lines. After dark, attacks on the 45th and 53rd Regiments increased with the 45th facing the heaviest action. Tactical air support was diverted to supporting the regiment including two B-52 strikes scheduled for 02:30 on 27 May and this blunted the attack. That same morning the 44th Regiment woke to discover PAVN tank and infantry within their perimeter. The area hadn't been properly secured and T-54 tanks were within 50 yards (46 m) of the bunkers. The defenders were able to use M-72 LAW fire to slow the tanks. By dawn, Hawk's Claw helicopters arrived from Pleiku. The dense smoke obscured the action but the Hawk's Claw crews were still able to destroy two T-54 tanks. With helicopters to neutralize the tanks, the ARVN infantry was able to stop the advance of the PAVN. The battle see-sawed back and forth on 28 May. The PAVN occupied bunkers and buildings in sections of the city and were too well fortified to be destroyed by air or artillery attacks. However, their ability to launch a sustained attack seemed to be gone. With US and RVNAF air superiority, PAVN troops could not receive adequate food and supplies from their bases in the jungle. The division counterattacked on 30 May and by midday on 31 May had ejected the PAVN from the city.

On 6 June, the PAVN's B3 Front Command mobilized their last reserve unit, the 66th Regiment to cover the withdrawal of all remaining within the city. From 29 May to 8 June the division went bunker to bunker cleaning out the remaining PAVN forces. On 9 June the city of Kontum was declared fully secure by the division commander, Ba, who had been promoted to brigadier general.

In mid-June the division launched a helicopter raid against the PAVN-occupied Tân Cảnh Base Camp and several other raids with limited results. Ground operations were conducted along Route 14 however ARVN control extended barely 10 km past Vo Dinh. To the south Route 14 to Pleiku was cleared of PAVN by the end of June.

At the end of 1972 Kontum was the last major city in the western highlands in South Vietnamese control. Highway 14 continued as an improved road as far as the ARVN outpost at Đắk Tô, about 40 km north of Kontum and was the main route to Kontum from the north. Although the ARVN had eventually cleared the city, a number or attempts to push the PAVN beyond Vo Dinh, north of Kontum, had failed. The forward ARVN defenses northwest of Kontum were the 44th Regiment at Base N, a strongpoint constructed behind the Dak Bla River and on Eo Gio hill, astride Highway 14 north of Base N, near the Kontum airfield. Strongpoint R south of N gave some depth to the defense. The Dak Bla River looped around the city on the south and meandered westward to join the Poko River near Trung Nghia village. The Montagnard hamlet of Polei Krong was on the Poko just north of the confluence. With the 85th Ranger Border Defense Battalion at Polei Krong, the ARVN held Trung Nghia with Kontum Regional Forces. The PAVN 10th Division was responsible for control of the area north and west of Kontum City. Its 28th Regiment was probably in the vicinity or the Ngok Bay ridge, a spine-like chain 2,000 feet (610 m) high that American troops had named Rocket Ridge because the PAVN had long used it as a base for firing rockets on Kontum. The 66th Regiment was in the vicinity of Đắk Tô, while on 31 December 1972 the 95B Regiment forced the 44th Regiment to withdraw, securing a lodgment in the Chu Pao Pass where Highway 14 curves between 3,000 feet (910 m) peaks south of Kontum City. All three regiments had incurred heavy losses during the Easter Offensive and were considered to have only about 25 percent of authorized strength. A fourth regiment, the 24B Independent Regiment of the B-3 Front, was located west or the Chu Pao Pass, it was probably at less than 40 percent of authorized strength. As the year ended, the division after heavy fighting was in possession of the Đức Cơ Camp. The division owed much of its success at Đức Cơ and in Thanh An District to heavy B-52 support and to the attached 41st Regiment, 22nd Division, which had taken Đức Cơ after elements of the division had failed. The defense of Đức Cơ was then turned over to the 73rd Ranger Border Defense Battalion. Although events proved that the ARVN could not hold Đức Cơ indefinitely, it was strong enough to prevent any significant PAVN gains elsewhere in Thanh An District. For either side to make any significant tactical gains in the Central Highlands, reinforcements would have to be added to the equation.

=== 1973–1974 ===
In the War of the flags in January 1973 the PAVN's B3 Front included Kontum, Pleiku, Phu Bon and Darlac Provinces, part of Quang Duc Province and western districts of Bình Định Province. Objectives assigned to PAVN/VC forces in B3 Front were to hold the 23rd Division in place, isolate the cities of Kontum, Pleiku, and Ban Me Thuot and interdict the main highways. Attaining these objectives would effectively extend control over the population of the Central Highlands. The PAVN/VC waited until the night of 26 January to make their moves into the hamlets and villages, and not until the morning of the ceasefire did the attacks reach full intensity. The timing meant that the ARVN would have to conduct its counterattacks after the ceasefire and so in theory would be subject to International Commission of Control and Supervision (ICCS) observation and control. Preparations for occupying the villages and hamlets in the highlands began on 20 and 21 January when elements of both PAVN divisions, the 10th and 320th, began attacks to tie down ARVN defenders. On 20 January the 320th Division attacked Đức Cơ Camp and by the next day controlled the camp. On 27 January the 24th and 28th Regiments, 10th Division attacked Polei Krong and Trung Nghia, forcing the 85th Ranger Border Defense Battalion to withdraw from Polei Krong on the 28th.

On 26 January, in coordination with the Polei Krong and Trung Nghia attack, the 95B Regiment, 10th Division, seized Highway 14 where it traversed the Chu Pao Pass and held on until 10 February. Farther south, in Darlac Province, a bridge on Highway 14 near Buôn Hồ was destroyed and several hamlets infiltrated. Contact with Ban Me Thuot by way of Highway 14 was interrupted until about 14 February. The VC Gia Lai Provincial Unit closed Highway 19 at the Pleiku-Bình Định border and maintained the block until 4 February. South of Pleiku City, elements of the 320th Division were successful in closing Highway 14 temporarily. Pleiku City itself received repeated attacks by 122 mm rockets on 28 January, but damage was light. The PAVN/VC failed to hold the occupied villages and sustained heavy losses and their military effectiveness decreased significantly. The most important gain was the recapture of Đức Cơ in time to receive the ICCS, this achievement aside, by mid-February the military balance in the highlands was generally the same as it had been at the end of December 1972.

From 8 June to August 1973 the 44th Regiment fought the Battle of Trung Nghia until replaced by the 42nd Regiment, 22nd Division. On 1 September 1973, when the 42nd Regiment began their final assault on Trung Nghia, the 53rd Regiment occupied Plei Djo Drap, vacated by the withdrawing PAVN 66th Regiment.

From 30 October to 10 December 1973, the division, together with Ranger forces, fought the Battle of Quang Duc, successfully defeating PAVN efforts to expand their logistical network from Cambodia.

On 2 August 1974, the division commander, Brigadier general Le Trung Tuong, moved his main headquarters from Kontum to a more central location in Pleiku. In Kontum he left a forward command post and a sizable force of infantry under the command of his deputy, Colonel Hu The Quang. The troops under Quang's command included the 45th Regiment, defending the northeast approaches to Kontum City and operating in the mountainous jungle between Route 5B and Outpost Number 4. About 15 km northeast of Kontum, Outpost Number 4 was lost to a PAVN attack during the summer and never recovered by the ARVN. It had provided a base for interdicting a PAVN road, called Route 715, which they were constructing from Vo Dinh, northeast of Kontum, towards Bình Định. North of Outpost Number 4, Outpost Number 5 served a similar purpose, but it was also lost to the PAVN that summer. Quang had the 40th Regiment, attached from the 22nd Division, securing the northwestern approaches to the city. Two battalions of the 44th Regiment were in reserve behind the 40th northwest of Kontum, while the third battalion was retraining in Ban Me Thuot. Three RF battalions staffed outposts along the northern and western approaches, while a fourth RF battalion and two Ranger battalions secured the southern reaches of the province and the Chu Pao Pass. Although Quang felt that he could defend Kontum City, ARVN formations in the highlands had lost the mobility that had previously enabled II Corps to deploy forces rapidly by air from small patrols to entire divisions, to meet PAVN threats and somewhat nullify the advantages of initiative and surprise. Constraints on fuel and maintenance had all but eliminated air mobility. Long range reconnaissance patrols, formerly moved by helicopter, were now walking to objective areas, their range and ability to remain drastically shortened. Logistical airlift for the entire province was limited to one CH-47 helicopter; consequently, nearly all supply and evacuation was trucked as far as possible, then carried over steep trails to forward positions. Thus, even in good weather, the ARVN could not reinforce or rescue isolated outposts. PAVN pressure declined in September, and the division in Kontum concentrated on the PAVN's Route 715, which by mid-September had been extended to within 15 km of the boundary of Bình Định and Pleiku Provinces, bypassing the Kontum defenses on the east. II Corps sent long range reconnaissance patrols against the road to lay mines and sabotage trucks and roadbuilding equipment, and air strikes were called in. Four 175 mm guns in Kontum, with fires adjusted by the province's remaining L-19 observation plane, also interdicted Route 715. Persistent ARVN attacks caused high casualties among the PAVN work parties and temporarily stopped further extension of the road.

=== 1975 ===
Ground action in January in Kontum and Pleiku was limited to probes, patrols, and attacks by fire, but the RVNAF was busy daily striking the surge of truck convoys rolling south along new PAVN logistical corridors. In one attack in early January, north of Kontum City, 17 loaded trucks were destroyed, an experience frequently repeated throughout the month and into February. Meanwhile Division Ranger teams conducted several raids against the PAVN fuel pipeline, however the cuts in the line were only temporary inconveniences. On the other hand, a PAVN sapper raid on 9 January in Pleiku destroyed 1,500,000 gallons of assorted fuel, a heavy loss to the ARVN's already severely strained logistics. By 10 January, spoiling attacks by the division's Ranger Group had reached positions 10 km north of Kontum City along Route 14. The objective, Vo Dinh, however, was beyond reach, as PAVN resistance stiffened. Meanwhile, in Pleiku Province, along Route 19 east of Le Trung, a PAVN attack overran outposts of the 223rd RF Battalion. The 45th Regiment counterattacked and within a few days recaptured the original positions.

In mid-January the PAVN 320th Division was observed moving south toward Darlac and a buildup near Ban Me Thuot was detected. On 30 January, air strikes damaged three tanks in a base area north of Ban Me Thuot, and the 53rd Regiment launched an operation into the area, meeting light resistance. II Corps commander, General Phạm Văn Phú sent the 2nd Battalion, 45th Regiment, south from Pleiku to reinforce security along Route 14 near where the Pleiku, Darlac and Phu Bon Province boundaries met. On 4 February, near the mountain village of Buon Brieng, the battalion picked up a PAVN rallier from the 48th Regiment, 320th Division, who confirmed that the 320th was moving to Darlac. He said that the 320th left Đức Cơ about 12 January and that reconnaissance parties from both the 10th and 320th Divisions had been in Quang Duc and Darlac Provinces, respectively, in recent days. In Darlac Province in early February, the division had a forward command post in Ban Me Thuot, two battalions of the 53rd Regiment, one battalion of the 45th Regiment, and six of the seven Regional Force battalions belonging to the province. While the seventh RF battalion was deployed in Kontum Province, the six in Darlac were widely separated and in isolated areas. Two were around Ban Don, northwest of Ban Me Thuot, one was patrolling local Route 1 between Ban Me Thuot and Ban Don, one was in an outpost north of Ban Me Thuot on Route 430; another was securing a resettlement village on National Route 21 close to the Khánh Hòa boundary; while the sixth was south in Lac Thien District. Phú responded to the growing threat to Darlac Province by committing the entire 45th Regiment to the Darlac-Phu Bon border area, attempting to find and destroy the elements of the 320th Division. While these operations were going on north of Ban Me Thuot, the PAVN in the last two weeks of February ambushed three ARVN convoys on Route 21 east of the capital. On 28 February an ARVN unit ambushed a PAVN reconnaissance patrol only 12 km north of Ban Me Thuot, and the G-2 of II Corps, as well as the G-2 of the JGS, insisted that a major attack on Ban Me Thuot was imminent. Heavy fighting, meanwhile, had flared in Kontum and Pleiku Province. For the first time since the Easter Offensive, Kontum City on 28 February, and again on 4 March, received a PAVN artillery attack. In western Pleiku, the 44th Regiment and the 25th Ranger Group came under strong attack in Thanh An District. Sensing that the main PAVN attack would be in Kontum and Pleiku, and believing that the fighting at Ban Me Thuot was a deception, Phú recalled the 45th Regiment from Darlac to Pleiku. He also directed the division to pull its forward command post out of Ban Me Thuot and return it to Pleiku. Further, on 4 March he ordered the 22nd Division to alert their 42nd Regiment for movement to Pleiku.

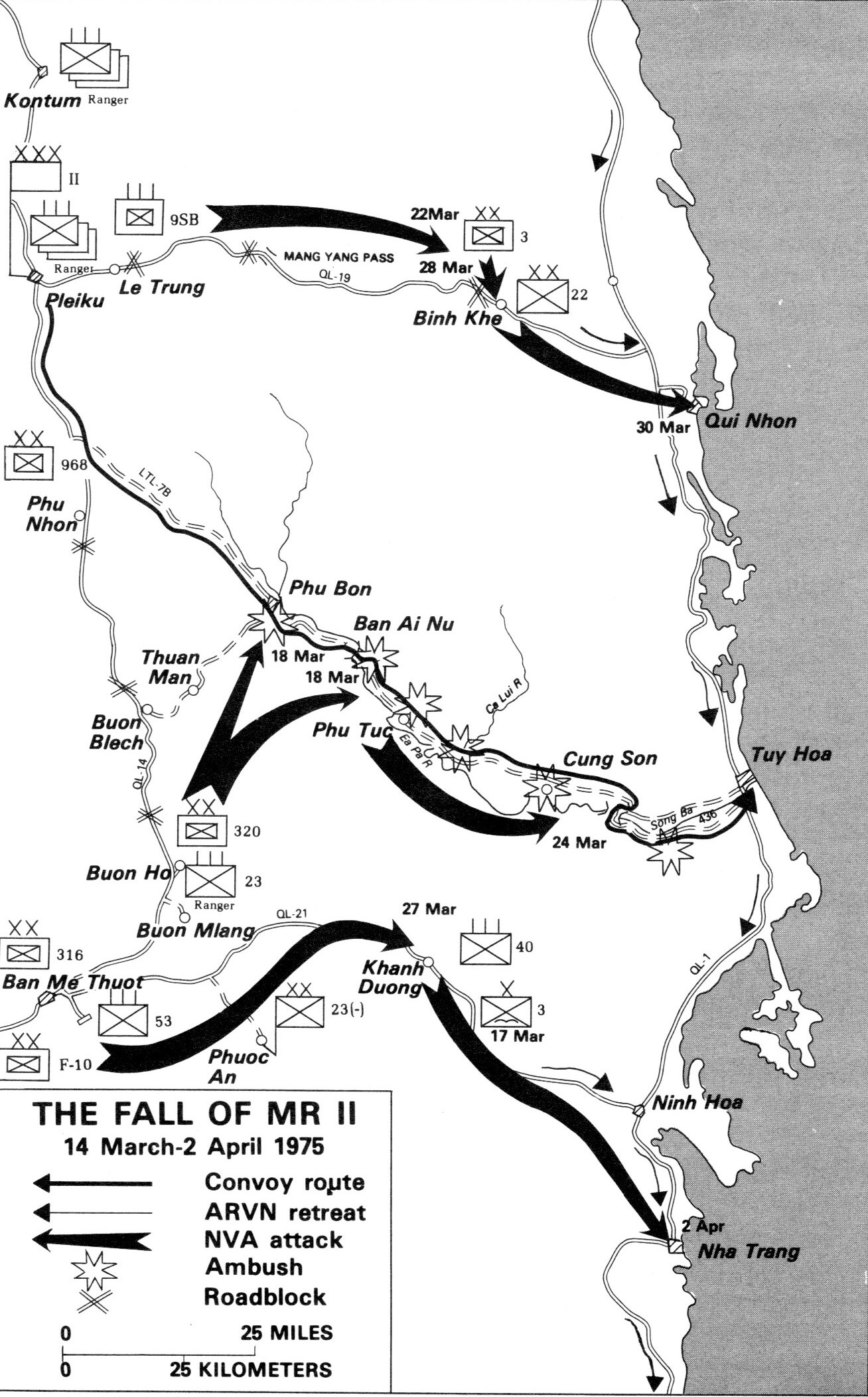
Map of the fall of II Corps

The opening salvoes of the PAVN's Campaign 275 sounded along Route 19, the lifeline to the highlands, in the early morning of 4 March. Simultaneous attacks closed the highway from the Mang Yang Pass in Pleiku Province to Bình Định Province. PAVN sappers blew Bridge 12 southeast of Binh Khê, in Bình Định and infantry struck RF/RF on the high ground overwatching the An Khê Pass and the RF unit at the Route 3A junction. Soon an artillery position supporting the 2nd Battalion, 47th Infantry, 22nd Division north of Binh Khê was overrun. A strong attack by the PAVN 12th Regiment, 3rd Division, near the An Khê Airfield was repulsed, while Phu Cat Air Base received a rocket attack and sustained light damage. While Bình Định RF/PF and the 47th Regiment struggled to hold their positions against the withering PAVN artillery, infantry, and sapper assaults, ARVN forces in Pleiku Province came under heavy rocket, mortar, and recoilless rifle fire along Route 19 from Le Trung, 15 km east of Pleiku City, to the narrow defiles of the Mang Yang Pass. Fire Support Bases 92 (east of Le Trung), 93 (near Soui Doi) and 94 (north of Hill 3045), all came under bombardment, while a number of their outposts were overrun. Two bridges and a large culvert between FSBs 93 and 94 were destroyed by PAVN sappers. Phú reacted by sending two battalions of the 4th Ranger Group to join elements of the 2nd Armored Cavalry Brigade, then clearing parts of Route 19 to proceed as far as FSB 95 in Bình Định Province, just east of the Mang Yang Pass, but before the operation could get under way, Base 94 was overrun. Meanwhile, PAVN rockets hit Pleiku Air Base; although the field remained operational, the maintenance area sustained heavy damage. While the attacks along Route 19 were viewed by Phú as strong indicators that the PAVN's main effort would be against Pleiku, the PAVN also interdicted Route 21, the other major road to the highlands, which connected coastal Khánh Hòa Province with Ban Me Thuot. Sappers blew two bridges between the Darlac boundary and Khanh Duong in Khánh Hòa Province and PAVN infantry overran an RF/PF outpost close to the provincial boundary. The only two available roads to the highlands were closed; the battlefield of the Central Highlands had been isolated in 24 hours of concentrated assaults. At II Corps headquarters, ARVN officers debated where the PAVN's main effort would take place. Colonel Trinh Tieu, the G-2, insisted that Ban Me Thuot would be the principal objective, with intermediate and supporting objectives at Buôn Hồ and Duc Lap. Based on indications that elements of the 10th and 320th Divisions had shifted south or had at least conducted reconnaissance in Quang Duc and Darlac Provinces, he told Phú that the attacks in Kontum, Pleiku and on Route 19 were diversionary, designed primarily to hold the major ARVN strength in place in Bình Định, Kontum and Pleiku. Phú nevertheless, believed Pleiku to be the main PAVN objective. His reasoning was based on the weight of the current PAVN attacks by fire against the 44th Regiment in Thanh An District of Pleiku and against the Rangers north of Kontum. Having only two regiments protecting the western approaches to Pleiku, he would not weaken this front to reinforce Ban Me Thuot where nothing significant had yet taken place.

Local Route 487 twisted through the forested highlands or southwestern Phu Bon Province between Cheo Reo, the capital and Buon Blech, where it joined National Route 14 about 60 km north of Ban Me Thuot. At this junction the PAVN on 8 March, struck the first direct blow of Campaign 275. Elements of the 9th Regiment, 320th Division, attacked the subsector headquarters and the 23rd Reconnaissance Company forcing a withdrawal. Meanwhile, the 45th Regiment on Route 14 near Thuan Man reported contact with PAVN infantry. The fighting continued through the day, but Route 14 was permanently blocked by the 9th Regiment. On 9 March, the PAVN 10th Division launched simultaneous attacks throughout Quang Duc Province. The assault against the Rangers at Kien Duc was repulsed, and the Quang Duc RF/PF at Duc Lap also held their positions, but south of Duc Lap, at the Đăk Song District crossroads, heavy artillery bombardment and infantry assaults drove the 2nd Battalion, 53rd Regiment, from its defenses and by noon it was overrun. Phú was now convinced that Darlac was the main battlefield and his forces there needed immediate reinforcement. He asked the JGS for an additional Ranger group but was turned down; the JGS had few reserves and threats elsewhere were mounting. Failing to acquire additional combat power from outside the region, Phú pulled the 72nd and 96th Ranger Battalions, 21st Ranger Group, from the Chu Pao Pass and Kontum and flew them to Buôn Hồ; once there they boarded trucks for the 35 km ride to Ban Me Thuot. He also ordered the 45th Reconnaissance Company at Ban Don to return to Ban Me Thuot.

==== Battle of Ban Me Thuot ====
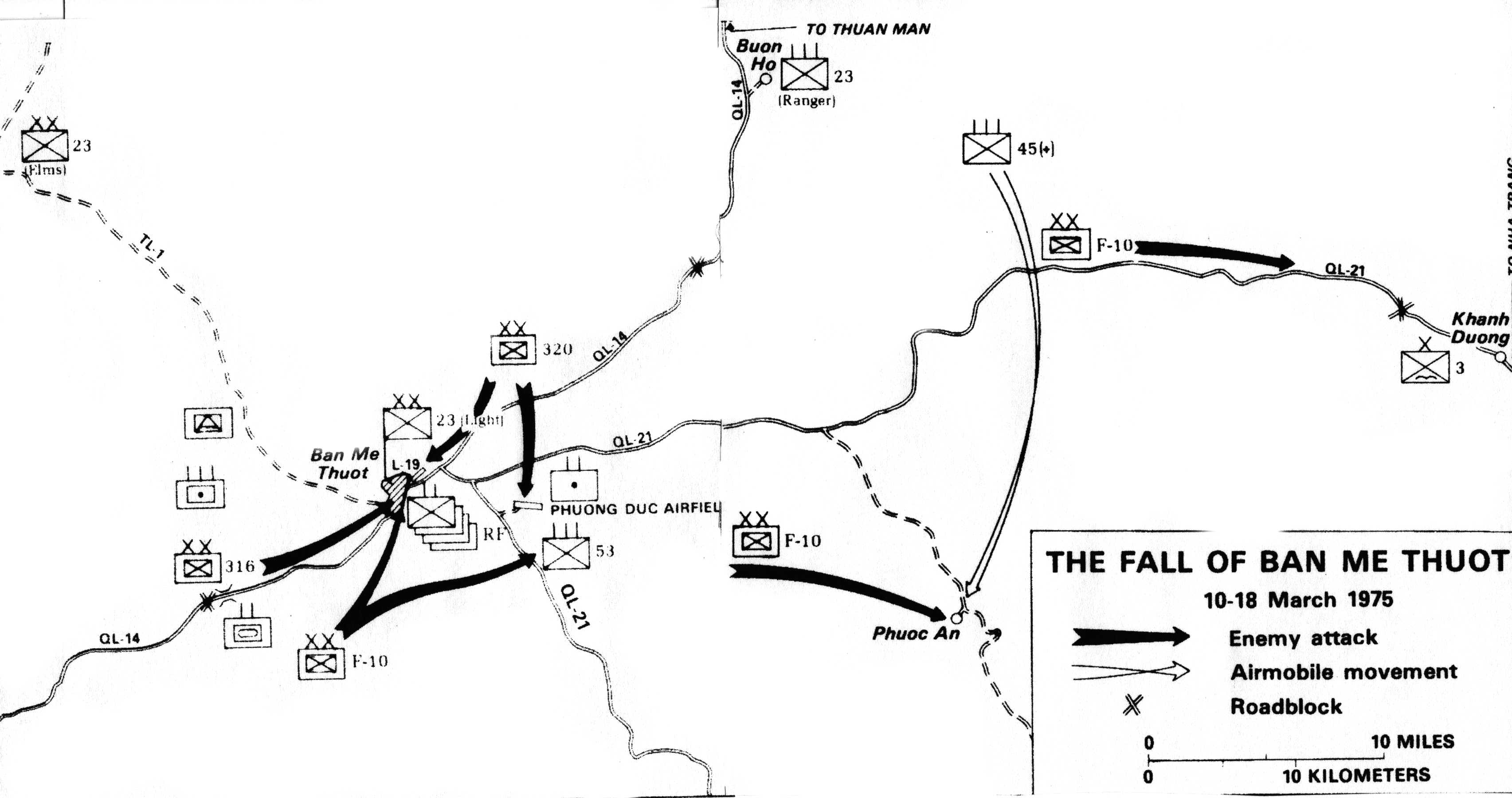
Map of the Battle of Ban Me Thuot

In the early morning or 10 March 1975 heavy rockets and artillery fire fell on Ban Me Thuot and mortar fire struck the Phung Duc Airfield to the east. The bombardment was followed by infantry and sapper assaults against the ammunition dump on local Route 1 west of the city; the 2nd Company, 225th RF Battalion on Hill 559 northwest of the city, and the subsector headquarters at Phung Duc Airfield. All attacks were repulsed, and PAVN losses were heavy. Just before four that morning, the 3rd Battalion, 53rd Regiment, came under heavy attack at the airfield and PAVN tanks were sighted northwest of the city. Meanwhile, attacks in Quang Duc Province continued as the 259th RF Battalion fought off PAVN infantry on Route 12 between Dak Song and Duc Lap and the Rangers held their ground in Kien Duc and Gia Nghia. On 15 March the beleaguered defenders of Kien Duc, however, were finally overrun.

In Bình Định Province, General Phan Dinh Niem, commanding the 22nd Division, reinforced his 42nd Regiment in Binh Khe District with the headquarters and two battalions of the 41st Regiment, but Route 19 was still cut at Le Trung and Binh Khe. Attacking Rangers were stalled at Bridge 31 between Fire Support Bases 93 and 94 in Pleiku Province. Although a heavy rocket attack on the airfield at Pleiku on 10 March closed down operations for several hours, Route 14 between Kontum and Pleiku remained open. A steady stream of traffic surged south through the Chu Pao Pass as the population of Kontum fled the daily rocketing of their city and the imminent threat of PAVN invasion. Highway 14 was closed on 10 March in southern Pleiku by PAVN attacks on territorial outposts in the mountains close to the Darlac boundary.

By mid-morning on 10 March, major elements of the 320th Division had penetrated Ban Me Thuot. The heaviest fighting was in the southern sector near the Province chief's residence, the sector headquarters and the division command post. Five PAVN tanks were destroyed or disabled near the command post, but one of the RVNAF bombs intended for PAVN armor demolished the sector headquarters, cutting off all communications. Two more tanks were destroyed near the city's airfield. The small ARVN garrison there fought back repeated PAVN assaults and held on to the control tower, but Phú's effort to fly two RF battalions from Ban Don to Ban Me Thuot was thwarted by heavy small arms and automatic weapons fire. Both battalions were therefore diverted to Buôn Hồ, which also came under mortar attack on 10 March. Fighting at the airfield destroyed eight aircraft of the 6th Air Division, a CH-47, one O-1 and six UH-1s. Four of the seven UH-1s belonging to the 2nd Air Division were destroyed on the ground, but air crews managed to fly out three damaged helicopters under heavy fire. The sector ammunition storage site southwest of the city was overrun; 10,000 rounds of 105 mm ammunition were destroyed, and two 105 mm howitzers were lost. At the Phung Duc Airfield, the 3rd Battalion, 53rd Regiment took two prisoners who identified the attackers as the 25th Independent Regiment and the 401st Sapper Battalion. By the night of 10 March the PAVN had a firm hold on the center of Ban Me Thuot, while the principal remaining ARVN infantry, cavalry and RF/PF held positions east, west and south of the city. The 2nd Company, 225th RF Battalion remained on Hill 559, and the 4th Company, 242d RF Battalion still held the main ammunition dump. In a coffee plantation west of Ban Me Thuot most of the 1st Battalion, 53rd Regiment and Headquarters and 3rd Troop, 8th Armored Cavalry, defended their perimeter. The 4th Company, 243rd RF Battalion, was dug in on Hill 491 to the south. Small units of the 53rd Regiment and RF/PF were still fighting in the city, but the heaviest combat was at the Phung Duc airfield. There, the division's forward command post fought along with the headquarters of its 53rd Regiment and the 3rd Troop, 8th Armored Cavalry. Survivors of the sector headquarters were with some Ranger units west of the airfield.

Very heavy fighting continued on 11 March, ARVN defenders estimated 400 PAVN killed, 50 weapons captured and 13 tanks destroyed and the 53rd Regiment at the airfield reported that the PAVN was using flamethrowers in the assault. Isolated pockets of resistance fought on, even though the province chief, Colonel Nguyễn Trọng Luật, was captured.

In Pleiku, the 4th Ranger Group gained no ground on Route 19 in heavy fighting near Bridge 23 and Fire Support Base 93 as the PAVN 95B Regiment counterattacked vigorously on 11–12 March. Fighting was widespread but light in the rest of Pleiku. The environs of the city were mortared, the II Corps headquarters sustained minor damage from a rocket attack, and three A-37 attack planes were destroyed along with fuel storage and a parts warehouse at Pleiku Air Base by 122 mm rockets.

The disastrous turn of events in II Corps led to the turning point in the war, compelling President Nguyễn Văn Thiệu to make a decision regarding the conduct of the defense which would create chaos for the South Vietnamese and opportunities for the North Vietnamese. Regarding the northern part of the country as expendable in order to preserve the security of III and IV Corps, he thought it essential to retake Ban Me Thuot, even though Kontum and Pleiku might have to be sacrificed. He wished to convey this new concept to Phú in Pleiku, but because of the hazards of such a meeting in that war-torn province, he was persuaded by his staff to meet the II Corps commander at Cam Ranh Base. On 12 March Phú announced that all organized resistance inside Ban Me Thuot had ceased. The 21st Ranger Group was assembling the survivors of its two committed battalions near the Phung Duc Airfield and the 45th ARVN Infantry Regiment was moving by helicopters to Phuoc An District on Route 21, east of Ban Me Thuot. The next day, as the 320th Division consolidated its gains in Ban Me Thuot, the battle for Phung Duc continued. Recognizing the critical situation in the highlands, the JGS decided to send the 7th Ranger Group, its last available reserve, from Saigon to replace the 44th Regiment west of Pleiku, releasing the 44th to join the counterattack in Darlac.

The situation in Darlac continued to deteriorate, Quang Nhieu Village in the plantations north of Ban Me Thuot was overrun as was Buôn Hồ Village on Route 14. The ARVN gave up Ban Don and withdrew remaining RF units. The planned relief of the 44th Regiment west of Pleiku had to be aborted after one battalion and the regimental headquarters were moved because the required airlift could not be marshalled to complete it. On 14 March, Phu had assembled in Phuoc An a task force under the command of Division commander BG Tuong. In the task force were the 45th Regiment, one battalion and the headquarters of the 44th Regiment and one battalion of the 21st Ranger Group. The plan was to attack west astride Route 21 to link up with the tenacious defenders at the Phung Duc Airfield: the 3rd Battalion, 53rd Regiment, which had been there through four days of continuous fighting; the survivors of the lst Battalion, 53rd Regiment, who had withdrawn from west of the city; and the survivors of the 72nd and 96th Battalions, 21st Ranger Group. The counterattack was to be supported logistically from Nha Trang. Another task force of five RF battalions from Khánh Hòa Province was ordered to clear the route between Nha Trang and Khanh Duong.

On 14 March Phú flew to Cam Ranh Base to meet with Thiệu, Prime Minister Trần Thiện Khiêm, Minister of Defense Lieutenant general Đặng Văn Quang and Head of the JGS General Cao Văn Viên. Thiệu outlined his strategy for the Central Highlands, Phú's role would be to retake Ban Me Thuot using the troops he still had in Kontum and Pleiku Provinces and the 22nd Division. With Route 19 cut in Pleiku and Bình Định and no way to use Routes 14 and 21 through Darlac, Phú had only the rough interprovincial Route 7B available to recover his Kontum-Pleiku forces, assemble them in Khánh Hòa Province, and fight back along Route 21 into Buôn Ma Thuột. Although many hazards were discussed, this approach was accepted by the President and Phú flew back to his headquarters to set the withdrawal in motion.

That night, 14 March, PAVN sappers penetrated the Pleiku ammunition storage area and blew up 1,400 rounds of 105 mm howitzer shells. The deployments to Darlac had greatly weakened security in Pleiku and Phú had already ordered the evacuation of all nonessential military personnel and dependents from Kontum and Pleiku. Colonel Giao, the acting commander of the 6th Air Division at Pleiku, directed the evacuation of Pleiku Air Base. Brigadier general Tran Van Cam, the deputy commander for operations, II Corps, was left in command of forces in Pleiku Province. Colonel Pham Duy Tat, commander of II Corps Rangers, remained in Kontum Province in charge of RF/PF and three Ranger groups, the 6th, 22nd and 23rd, Tat was promoted to Brigadier general and would command the evacuation of Kontum and Pleiku down Route 7B to the coast at Tuy Hoa. Phú moved his command post to II Corps Rear at Nha Trang and replaced the captured Darlac Province Chief with Colonel Trinh Tieu, his own G-2, whose correct estimate of the PAVN offensive he had rejected.

As the division's counterattack from Phuoc An began on 15 March, the 53rd Regiment's situation at the airfield was grim. ARVN soldiers had withstood nearly continuous artillery and mortar bombardment and had beaten back successive assaults by the PAVN 25th Regiment, but the PAVN 316th Division, recently moved with great secrecy from North Vietnam, was poised to attack the battered 53rd Regiment and Rangers east of Ban Me Thuot. To block the division's counterattack from Phuoc An, General Văn Tiến Dũng ordered the PAVN 10th Division up from Quang Duc. The 10th met the advancing 45th Regiment and stopped it at the Ea Nhiae River, 10 km short of its planned link-up with the 53rd Regiment. The 2nd Battalion, 45th Regiment was shattered in this fierce engagement and the ARVN counterattack became a withdrawal. Tuong, slightly wounded as his helicopter received fire on 10 March, had himself evacuated and command reverted to the senior colonel in the task force, Colonel Duc. Behind the withdrawing survivors of the division, RF/PF from Khánh Hòa were meeting stiff resistance at Khanh Duong. Fighting for the high ground overlooking the road to Nha Trang, they captured some soldiers from the 25th Independent Regiment, which had apparently slipped around the division at Phuoc An after failing to dislodge the 53rd Regiment at Phung Duc Airfield. The renewed PAVN offensive in Darlac Province, led by the 10th Division along Route 21, pushed the division task force eastward, first back to Phuoc An, then through Chu Kuk near the Khánh Hòa boundary. Finally, the division command post reached Khanh Duong and settled there to recover the remnants of its battalions as they straggled in. Without resupply, the survivors of the 3rd Battalion, 53rd Regiment, on 18 March gave up Phung Duc Airfield and began a tortuous withdrawal eastward.

On 21 March, what remained of the division was flown to the relative security of Cam Ranh, by this time, the exodus from Pleiku was well under way. The PAVN still held high ground in and around Khanh Duong on Route 21, although the 2nd and 3rd Battalions of the 40th Regiment, 22nd Division, had been moved from Bình Định Province to reinforce the attack. The 3rd Airborne Brigade, pulled out of Quảng Nam Province on Presidential orders to become a reserve in Saigon, was taken off its ships in Nha Trang and rushed to Khanh Duong to halt the pursuing PAVN 10th Division. The immediate tasks facing II Corps were to regroup its battered forces, complete the evacuation from the highlands and stop the PAVN advance on Route 21 at Khanh Duong. The counteroffensive to recapture Ban Me Thuot would have to wait.

==== Retreat from the Central Highlands ====
The evacuation of South Vietnamese forces from the highland provinces began in great secrecy; Phú hoped that surprise would make it possible to reach Tuy Hòa before the PAVN could discover and react to the movement. Accordingly, only a few staff officers and commanders were told of the plan in advance; the chiefs of the affected Provinces, Kontum, Pleiku and Phu Bon, only found out about it when they saw ARVN units moving. The operation was prepared only in outline; detailed orders were never drafted or issued. Not foreseeing the inevitable mass civilian exodus that would accompany the military column as soon as the population discovered what was going on, Phú made no preparations to control the crowds which became entangled in combat formations, impeding their movement and ability to deploy and fight. The only road available, Route 7B, was a track southeast of Cheo Reo, overgrown with brush, with fords in disrepair and an important bridge out. Aware of the road's condition, Phú put the 20th Engineer Group in the vanguard. A few military vehicles began the journey to Phu Bon on 15 March, but the main body was scheduled to move over a four-day period beginning on the 16th. 200-250 trucks were to move in each echelon, and each echelon would be protected by a company of M48 tanks of the 21st Tank Battalion. The Ranger Battalions of the five groups still in Kontum and Pleiku Provinces, together with one tank company, would be the rearguard, to depart Pleiku on 19 March. Logistical units with ammunition and fuel trucks and some of the Corps' artillery were assigned to the first echelon, followed by more logistical and artillery units on 17 March. The II Corps staff, military police and the balance of the 44th Regiment would move the next day. RF/PF units were supposed to provide security along the route, an unrealistic mission since the Province chiefs were not issued orders. Additionally, there were about 20,000 tons of ARVN and RVNAF ammunition in the supply points, a 45-day stock of fuels, and 60 days of rations. Some UH-1 helicopters and four CH-47 helicopters were sent up from IV Corps to reinforce the 2nd Air Division. C-130 transports flew civilian and military dependents out of Pleiku on 16 March, but a PAVN rocket attack closed the airfield that evening. The orders for the military evacuation were issued on 16 March; the 6th Ranger Group, defending the northeast sector above Kontum City, had withdrawn to Pleiku City the day before. The 22nd and 23rd Ranger Groups from north and northwest of Kontum pulled back to Pleiku the next day. At this time, the small force of the 44th Regiment and the 7th and 25th Ranger Groups were still defending west of Pleiku and part of the 25th was under heavy attack at Thanh An. General Tat, now in command of the withdrawing troops, moved his command post to Cheo Reo. Altering the plan slightly, he took with him, in addition to the engineers, one of his Ranger groups. This was a prudent modification, since the RF/PF were not prepared to secure the capital, the road, or the engineer work site. That afternoon, 16 March, Cheo Reo was struck by PAVN rockets in the first attack against the town. The withdrawal had been discovered, although this rocket attack was probably carried out coincidentally by local forces.

The PAVN became aware of the evacuation on 16 March apparently by a communications interception that II Corps Headquarters had moved its forward command post to Nha Trang. Later that day, a PAVN observation post reported a long column of trucks running south toward Phu Bon. General Dũng warned the 95B Regiment on Route 19, the 320th Division north of Ban Me Thuot on Route 14 and the 10th Division on Route 21, that the South Vietnamese forces were making a major deployment and all should be especially vigilant. Earlier he had asked about the condition of Route 7B and was told that it could not support military traffic past Cheo Reo. With the large ARVN convoy moving into Cheo Reo, Dũng was no longer satisfied with this response. Disturbed to learn that the road was apparently usable and that the 320th Division had not moved to block the column, he berated the division commander for laxity and ordered him to attack the withdrawing column without further delay. Except for the rocket attack on 16 March, the PAVN did not interfere with the column in Phu Bon and along the road to Cheo Reo until 18 March, but because II Corps' engineers had not yet completed a pontoon bridge across the Ea Pa River beyond Cheo Reo, several convoys were jammed in the town and along the road to the southeast. Late on 18 March, the 320th Division struck at Cheo Reo with artillery, mortars and infantry. Military and civilian casualties were heavy and wounded still lay unattended on the streets the next morning. Aerial photography taken on the morning of the 19th showed artillery fire still falling in the city and hundreds of vehicles, many of them damaged or destroyed, abandoned along the road and in the streets of Cheo Reo. The convoy pressed on, fighting as it struggled south. At mid-morning on 19 March the leading element was at the Côn River, 8 km east of Củng Sơn (13.0596°N 108.962°E) and about two-thirds of the distance from Cheo Reo to Tuy Hòa, but the ragged column stretched back to Cheo Reo where refugees still streamed through. At a ford over the Ca Lui River, 25 km northwest of Củng Sơn, a number of heavy vehicles became bogged down. An RVNAF air strike contributed to the carnage and confusion by mistakenly attacking a Ranger battalion and decimating it. By this time, little military order or discipline remained. Tat no longer had control of the withdrawing forces and the tank battalion commander was walking, no longer able to command his tanks although at least 10 M48s were still operational. As the head of the column reached the broad Ba River, about 10 km east of Củng Sơn, it found that Route 7D had been so heavily mined by South Korean forces who had operated in the area until 1973 that it was impractical to clear the route. Instead the engineers were ordered to bridge the Ba River and divert the column to local Route 436, which followed the south bank of the river to Tuy Hòa. Anticipating this movement, the PAVN set up five roadblocks along Route 436 in a 2 km stretch east of the Ba River crossing, stopping the movement of bridge sections from Tuy Hòa to the crossing. The 206th RF Battalion was therefore ordered to attack through the roadblocks from the east, while the 34th Ranger Battalion, with 16 M113s, would attack from the west after fording the Ba River.

On 20 March, heavy trucks and tanks tore up the ford on the Ba River so badly that pierced-steel planking had to be placed on the bottom. This was delivered by the CH-47s, which also began flying in bridge sections to the site about 1.5 km downstream from the ford. On 21 March, the column was concentrated around the ford and bridge sites east of Củng Sơn, but the Ranger rearguard was badly split back at Cheo Reo. The 6th, 7th and 22d Groups had most of their battalions past the Ca Lui crossing, but the 4th, 23rd and 25th were trapped behind the 320th Division, advancing on Củng Sơn. On 22 March, elements of the 64th Regiment, 320th Division attacked blocking positions established by the 6th Ranger Group west of Củng Sơn and ARVN engineers completed the bridge over the Ba River. In a rush to cross, the bridge was overloaded and a section collapsed, but the engineers quickly repaired the span, and many vehicles cleared the north bank of the river that day and night, only to face PAVN blocking positions along Route 436 in My Thanh Tay Village. While the 35th and 51st Ranger Battalions fought as a rear guard in a narrow defile about 7 km northwest of Củng Sơn, the 34th Rangers continued the attack east on Route 436 to clear the roadblocks. By this time, the 6th Ranger Group battalions were the only cohesive fighting units in the column, three of 18 battalions that began the long march through the Phu Bon gauntlet. The 35th and 51st Rangers repulsed a strong attack by the 64th Regiment on the night of 23 March, killing 50 and taking 15 weapons. These two battalions had mustered a force of 15 M41 light tanks, eight M48 medium tanks, 11 105 mm howitzers and two 155 mm howitzers. Two CH-47s kept the Rangers supplied with rations and ammunition as they fell back through Củng Sơn. Reinforced by two tank companies, the PAVN 320th Division pushed into Củng Sơn behind the withdrawing 6th Ranger Group late on 24 March. Meanwhile the 34th Battalion continued the attack against the blocking positions disposed in My Thanh Tay Village. Even though bad weather prevented air support, the Rangers reduced position after position. By 25 March they had broken the last position and led the shattered column into Tuy Hòa. Now hardly more than a company in strength, the 34th Battalion then turned around to guard the western approaches to Tuy Hòa. Eventually, about 60,000 refugees from the highlands straggled into Nha Trang, but at least 100,000 remained stranded in western Phú Yên Province without food, water, or medical assistance. One of the most poorly executed withdrawals in the war had ended.

==== The end of II Corps ====
The division counterattack from Phuoc An had been decisively defeated when Dung committed his 10th Division, up from Quang Duc. Survivors of the 23rd Rangers, RF/PF and civilians who escaped from Darlac streamed eastward across the plateau along Route 21. The military men were assembled at Khanh Duong, the last district on the high plain before the highway twisted down through the Deo Cao Pass to the coastal hills and lowlands of Khánh Hòa Province. The Deo Cao Pass was the obvious place for a defensive stand to protect Nha Trang, the site of the headquarters of II Corps, the headquarters of the Republic of Vietnam Navy's Second Coastal Zone and the RVNAF 2nd Air Division. Nha Trang also held the ARVN Noncommissioned Officer Academy and Lam Son, a major national training center, was nearby. North of Nha Trang, Route 21 joined Highway 1 at Ninh Hòa. West of Ninh Hòa, midway between the ocean and the hills of Khanh Duong District, was Dục Mỹ Camp, site of the Ranger Training Center and the ARVN Artillery School. Thus, with its military concentration and population, the Nha Trang-Ninh Hòa area was the last vital enclave in Military Region 2. Without it, a return to the highlands was virtually impossible. If it could be held, PAVN divisions could be prevented from rolling down Highway 1 to Saigon.

Most of the survivors from Darlac were moved on past Khanh Duong by road and helicopter, the Rangers to Dục Mỹ for regrouping, the division soldiers to Cam Ranh and Lam Son. A forward headquarters of the division was established at Khanh Duong to command the forces assigned to defend the pass: the 3rd Airborne Brigade, pulled from its ships at Nha Trang after being dispatched for Saigon from Quang Nam, and the headquarters and two battalions of the 40th Regiment, 22nd Division, from Bình Định Province. The PAVN 10th Division took up the pursuit after Phuoc An and closed rapidly on Khanh Duong. The 40th Regiment pushed west of the town to meet the advancing 10th Division. The 3rd Airborne Brigade dug in on the high ground in the pass, behind the 40th Regiment. On 22 March, the leading battalions of the 10th Division, with tanks supporting, blasted into Khanh Duong and the two battalions of the 40th Regiment were forced to withdraw through the 3rd Airborne Brigade. A network of logging roads traversed the dense, steep forests of western Khánh Hòa Province. If blocked by the 3rd Airborne in the pass on Route 21, the PAVN could send a large force south, bypassing the Airborne, and approach Nha Trang from the west through Diên Khánh District. To guard against this threat, the 40th was withdrawn to Dục Mỹ, then sent south to eastern Diên Khánh to prepare positions generally astride local Route 420, which led due east into Diên Khánh and on into Nha Trang. The 40th was reinforced with one RF battalion and supported by one 155 mm and two 105 mm howitzers. Long range reconnaissance patrols were sent into the forest south of Khanh Duong to try to detect any significant enemy force moving south toward Diên Khánh. Nothing of any size was detected, although some ominous signs of recent heavy traffic were reported.

In the Deo Cao Pass, with forward positions at Chu Kroa Mountain, a prominent peak over 3,100 feet (940 m), the 3rd Airborne Brigade dug in to await the PAVN 10th Division, whose 28th Infantry Regiment and tanks were already in Khanh Duong. A local RF battalion was in the pass south of the Airborne Brigade. The 34th Ranger Battalion, 7th Ranger Group was protecting the northern approach to Ninh Hòa at the Deo Cao Pass. With the Airborne still holding on Route 21, Phú announced on 29 March new command responsibilities in what was left of his military region. Niem, commanding the 22nd Division, was responsible for Binh Dinh and Phu Yen Provinces. The mountain provinces of Tuyen Duc and Lam Dong Districts were the responsibility of Major general Lâm Quang Thơ, commandant of the Vietnamese National Military Academy at Dalat. In addition to the territorials, Tho had some of the survivors of the 24th Ranger Group who had marched through the mountains after the fall of Quang Duc. Brigadier general Le Van Than, the Deputy Commander of II Corps, was sent to Cam Ranh. He would defend the Cam Ranh Special Sector, Ninh Thuan and Binh Thuan Provinces. He was also to re-form the division out of the 4,900 troops mustered at Cam Ranh. The most critical mission, the defense of Khanh Koa Province, fell to Brigadier general Tran Van Cam in command the 3d Airborne Brigade, the 40th Regiment and the 34th Ranger Battalion, and territorials. But before Cam could move from Phu Yen Province, where he was controlling the eastern end of the exodus on Route 7B, the 10th Division attacked the 3rd Airborne in the Deo Cao Pass on 30 March. Supported by the 40th Artillery Regiment and with two company of tanks attached, elements of the 28th and 66th Regiments the next day surrounded the 5th Airborne Battalion, at that time reduced by casualties to 20 percent strength. The 3rd Airborne Brigade was deployed in depth from Chu Kroa Mountain south for about 15 km along the high ground over the highway. Heavy PAVN fire knocked out 5 of 14 armored personnel carriers supporting the brigade, and the three 105 mm howitzer batteries in the force had to move to the rear, setting up near Buon Ea Thi where they were beyond supporting range of the forward Airborne positions. The collapse of the Airborne defense proceeded very rapidly afterwards. At Buon Ea Thi elements of the 10th Division outflanked Airborne positions along the road and struck the 6th Airborne Battalion. Although the troopers knocked out three T-54 tanks, they could not hold. With the brigade split at Buon Ea Thi, a rapid withdrawal was imperative to conserve what was left of the decimated force. The 3rd Airborne Brigade, less than one fourth of its soldiers still in ranks, marched back through Dục Mỹ and Ninh Hòa and stopped in a narrow defile where Highway 1 edged along the beach below Han Son Mountain, just north of Nha Trang. The 10th Division was close behind. On 1 April, PAVN tanks rolled through Dục Mỹ and Ninh Hòa and headed for Nha Trang. The II Corps staff drove south to Phan Rang, the defeated remnants of the Airborne, Rangers, RF/PF and 40th Infantry followed. The RVNAF evacuated Nha Trang Air Base at 15:00 and all flyable aircraft were flown out. On 2 April, PAVN tanks entered the city. The momentum of the PAVN advance was such that a defense at Cam Ranh was no longer feasible. Recognizing this, the JGS authorized the immediate evacuation of all that remained of II Corps through that port, and by 2 April the evacuation was underway.

By 11 April 1,000 soldiers of the division were regrouping at Long Hải, Phước Tuy Province.

== Organisation ==
The division comprised the following:

- Division HQ
- 44th Regiment
- 45th Regiment
- 53rd Regiment
- 230th, 231st, 232nd and 233rd Artillery Battalions
- 8th Armored Cavalry Squadron
- US Advisory Team 33
