= Operation Paul Revere IV =

Part of the Vietnam War (1966)

- Part of the Vietnam War
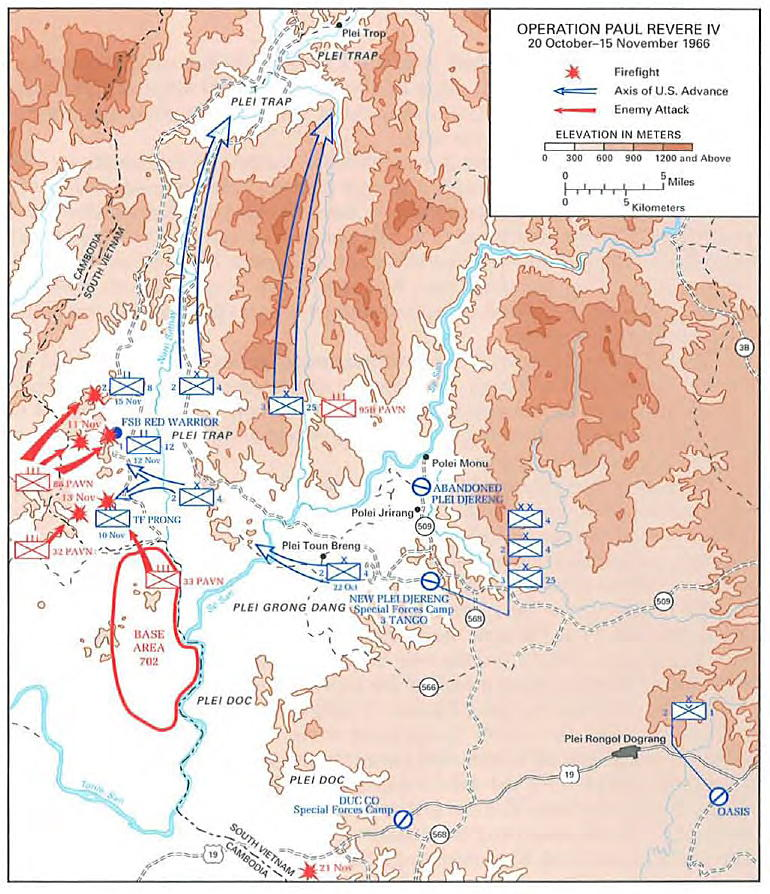
- Operation between 20 October and 15 November 1966
Date	20 October – 30 December 1966
Location	Plei Trap Valley, Gia Lai Province, South Vietnam 14.075°N 107.39°E
Result	Inconclusive

Belligerents
United States	North Vietnam

Commanders and leaders
Arthur S. Collins Jr.	Chu Huy Mân

Units involved
25th Infantry Division: 3rd Brigade; 4th Infantry Division: 2nd Brigade; 1st Cavalry Division: 2nd Brigade; 101st Airborne Division: 1st Brigade	33rd Regiment; 95B Regiment; 101C Regiment

Casualties and losses
376 killed PAVN claim: 2,400 killed	1,200 estimated killed

Operation Paul Revere IV was a United States Army operation of the Vietnam War that took place in the Plei Trap Valley, lasting from 20 October to 30 December 1966.

== Prelude ==
In early October 1966 United States intelligence reported a buildup of People's Army of Vietnam (PAVN) units near Plei Djereng and Đức Cơ Special Forces Camps southeast of the Plei Trap Valley near the Vietnam-Cambodia border.

== Battle ==
On 20 October the 3rd Brigade, 25th Infantry Division deployed to Plei Djereng and began to sweep northwest towards the southern Plei Trap and the Cambodian border engaging platoon-sized units from the PAVN 95B Regiment, 10th Division. On 22 October the 2nd Brigade, 4th Infantry Division arrived at Plei Djereng and began sweeping west.

The two US brigades found abandoned PAVN base camps and few enemy, but were subjected to attacks on their night defensive positions. On 30 October the 2nd Brigade, 1st Cavalry Division deployed to Landing Zone Oasis to protect Đức Cơ and the rear of the US force. On 5 November six US battalions moved north along two parallel lines of advance into the Plei Trap Valley, while a combined Army/Special Forces unit designated Task Force Prong (TF Prong) moved directly west towards the Cambodian border.

On 9 November the southern element of TF Prong was ambushed and fought a day-long battle with PAVN forces before the PAVN broke contact. On 10 November reinforced by a rifle company, TF Prong moved back to the ambush area and was again ambushed by elements of the PAVN 88th Regiment. Reinforcements were deployed by helicopter and linked up with TF Prong by midnight. On the morning of 11 November the northern element of TF Prong was ambushed by the PAVN and had to mount a day-long fighting retreat.

On 11 November the 1st Battalion, 12th Infantry Regiment was deployed by helicopter to assist TF Prong, two helicopters were shot down by PAVN machine guns during the landing. The 1/12 Infantry established a firebase called Firebase Red Warrior (14.075°N 107.39°E) near the landing zone and patrolled the immediate vicinity. On the evening of 12 November Red Warrior came under increasing mortar fire and two PAVN Battalions began human wave attacks on the north and west perimeters of the base. Two orbiting USAF A1E Skyraiders engaged the attackers with napalm, cluster-bombs and machine-gun fire. The PAVN withdrew at midnight and the following morning the US claimed that the 76 PAVN dead were found on the base perimeter while a helicopter pilot alleged a further 400 dead on the approaches to the base, while US losses were five killed and 41 wounded.

On 18 November units from the 2nd Brigade, 1st Cavalry discovered two large PAVN base camps, as they were destroying the bases they were attacked by units from the PAVN 33rd Regiment. US losses were 19 killed and 53 wounded while the US claimed that the PAVN lost over 165 killed.

On 21 November Company C 1st Battalion, 5th Cavalry Regiment patrolling near the Cambodian border was attacked by a battalion of the PAVN 101C Regiment, one platoon was completely overrun (many of them captured and executed) before US air and artillery support could be brought to bear on the PAVN; US losses were 32 killed, while PAVN losses were 145 killed.

The US battalions patrolling the northern Plei Trap were withdrawn by 20 November and the area was intensively bombed by B-52s from 20–30 November. The US battalions were then sent to try to locate the PAVN 32nd and 95B Regiments with little success.

On 9 December the 1st Brigade, 101st Airborne Division was airlifted into the northern Plei Trap with little effect as the PAVN had apparently withdrawn into Cambodia. From mid-December the operation began to wind down as the US brigades were redeployed elsewhere and finally concluded on 30 December 1966.

== Aftermath ==
Operation Paul Revere IV appeared to end inconclusively for both sides; United States losses were approximately 376 dead and 1,441 wounded, while US after-action reports claimed 1,200 PAVN killed and captured. US intelligence reported that the PAVN 33rd Regiment were rendered combat ineffective for a year, the 95B Regiment never fought again and the 101C Regiment was downgraded to a Battalion and spread amongst the 32nd and 88th Regiments. These units typically changed names to confuse Allied intelligence.

Estimates of enemy casualties are largely unknown and mostly from battlefield reports and so the true estimates are not known. In a 1980 official history, the PAVN claimed victory in the battles and to have killed 2,400 Allied troops, including 2,000 Americans.
