= Operation Paul Revere =

Part of the Vietnam War (1966)

- Part of the Vietnam War
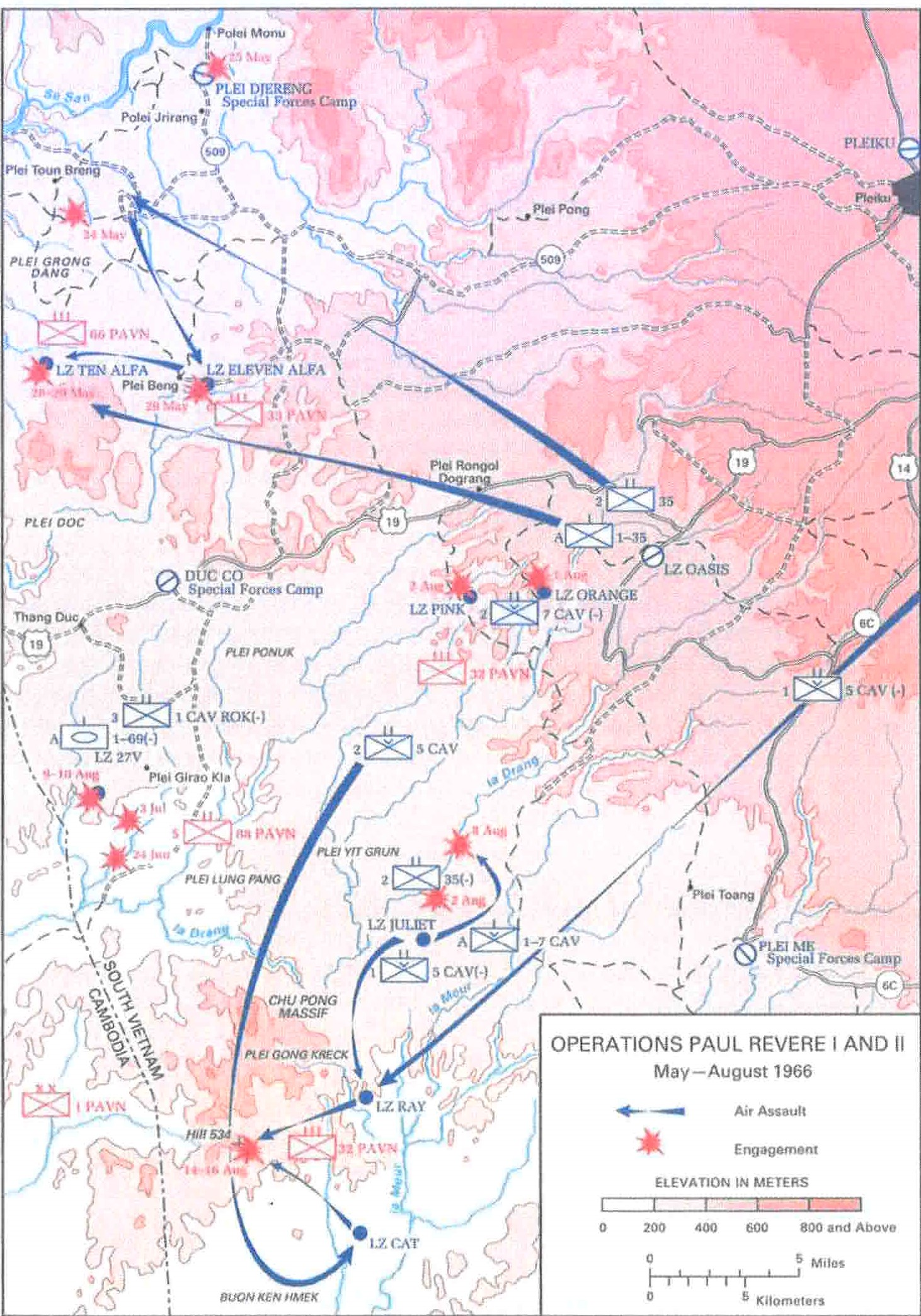
- Operations Paul Revere I and II, May-August 1966
Date	10 May – 1 August 1966
Location	west of Pleiku, South Vietnam 13.805°N 107.872°E

Belligerents
United States South Korea	North Vietnam

Commanders and leaders
Glenn D. Walker	Unknown

Units involved
3rd Brigade, 25th Infantry Division; 2nd Battalion, 7th Cavalry Regiment	32nd Regiment; 33rd Regiment; 66th Regiment

Casualties and losses
66 killed	546 killed 68 captured

Operation Paul Revere was a 3rd Brigade, 25th Infantry Division operation that took place west of Pleiku, lasting from 10 May to 31 July 1966. Total US casualties were 66 killed, while the US had claimed that North Vietnamese losses were 546 killed and 68 captured.

== Prelude ==
On 10 May 1966 following sightings of large People's Army of Vietnam (PAVN) forces west of Đức Cơ and Plei Me Camps, the 3rd Brigade, 25th Infantry Division was deployed to Landing Zone Oasis to sweep the area to the southwest. After a week of fruitless searching the Brigade changed its focus to the west to the Chu Pong Massif.

== Operation ==
On the morning of 24 May a CIDG patrol was ambushed by an estimated two battalions of PAVN 10 kilometres southwest of Plei Djereng Camp. The patrol was reinforced by a further two CIDG Companies and the fighting continued throughout the day with both sides digging in for the night. On the morning of 25 May, the PAVN attacked the CIDG positions and they withdrew in a running firefight towards Plei Djereng, losses were 18 Montagnards and 2 US Special Forces advisers. The PAVN then proceeded to mortar the camp killing a further 30 Montagnards and wounding 54.

BG Glenn D. Walker ordered the 2nd Battalion, 35th Infantry Regiment (2/35th Infantry) to relieve Plei Djereng and they operated south of the camp for the next 2 days. On 27 May the 2/35th Infantry moved 20 kilometres south of Plei Djereng to Landing Zone (LZ) Eleven Alfa and on 28 May Company B was landed by helicopter 10 kilometres west at LZ Ten Alfa. LZ Ten Alfa was a "hot" landing zone and after only 63 men had been landed it was closed to helicopters due to PAVN fire. The men of Company B beat off several PAVN attacks before supporting fire allowed the rest of the Company and Company A 1/35th Infantry to land. After midnight on 29 May the PAVN 66th Regiment launched an attack on LZ Ten Alfa while the PAVN 33rd Regiment attacked LZ Eleven Alfa, both attacks were repulsed and at dawn the Americans found 80 PAVN bodies around LZ Ten Alfa. As the Americans moved beyond the perimeter on LZ Ten Alfa they were met with PAVN fire and forced back into the LZ which was hit by mortar fire and the PAVN then assaulted again. This attack and another several hours later were both beaten back with total PAVN losses of 250 dead.

The 3rd Brigade then searched south and west of LZ Ten Alfa for the next 8 days but were unable to locate the PAVN who had presumably withdrawn across the border into Cambodia.

On 17 June BG Walker moved the focus of the operation back to the Chu Pong Massif. On 20 June the 2/35th Infantry's reconnaissance platoon, operating 10 kilometres north of the Chu Pong Massif pursued a group of PAVN soldiers and was pinned down by heavy fire and had to be rescued by the Battalion and Troop C 3rd Squadron, 4th Cavalry Regiment, US losses were 3 killed and 14 wounded.

At 10:30 on 24 June the 1/35th Infantry's reconnaissance platoon came under fire near the Cambodian border, the platoon called in air and artillery support which forced the PAVN to withdraw. As the Americans advanced they ran into well entrenched PAVN positions and despite reinforcement by a further two companies and an armored cavalry troop the Americans were unable to penetrate the PAVN positions by nightfall when the PAVN slipped across the border.

On 3 July a patrol by Company B 1/35th Infantry was ambushed near the Cambodian border. A platoon from Company B and the Brigade armored cavalry troop was sent to rescue the patrol and they succeeded in rescuing them and withdrawing to the north under cover of air and artillery strikes. US losses were 17 dead and 32 wounded, while 23 PAVN dead were found in the area the following day.

At the end of July prisoner interrogation indicated that the PAVN 66th Regiment was located on the north of the Chu Pong Massif and that the PAVN 32nd Regiment was located 10 kilometres southwest of LZ Oasis. BG Walker's Brigade was reinforced by the 2nd Battalion, 7th Cavalry Regiment (2/7th Cavalry) and the Republic of Korea Army 3rd Battalion, 1st Cavalry Regiment. While the 3rd Brigade and the Koreans deployed north and east of the Chu Pong Massif, on 31 July the 2/7th Cavalry was deployed by helicopter to LZ Orange 7 kilometres southwest of LZ Oasis. At dawn on 1 August the PAVN 32nd Regiment hit LZ Orange with mortar fire followed by 3 infantry assaults. The Americans called in air support and the PAVN withdrew to the northwest. The Americans lost 5 dead and 40 wounded, while a patrol found 28 PAVN dead.

== Aftermath ==
Operation Paul Revere officially concluded at midnight on 31 July and was immediately succeeded by Operation Paul Revere II. Total US casualties were 66 killed, while the US had claimed that PAVN losses were 546 killed and a further 68 captured.
