= 10th Division (Vietnam) =

10th Infantry Division
- Active: 1972-present
- Allegiance: Vietnam
- Branch: People's Army of Vietnam
- Type: Infantry
- Size: Division

The 10th Infantry Division is a division of the People's Army of Vietnam (PAVN), first formed in September 1972.

== Vietnam War ==
The division was formed on 20 September 1972 from the 28th, 66th and 95th Infantry Regiments.

The division was under the control of the B3 Front. The 95B Regiment was one of the units targeted in Operation Paul Revere IV from 20 October to 30 December 1966. Following the operation the 95B Regiment was rendered combat ineffective.

From 8 June to 16 September 1973 the division fought the Battle of Trung Nghia against the Army of the Republic of Vietnam (ARVN) 23rd Division. Prisoners captured by the ARVN at Trung Nghia stated that they had suffered losses of 30 percent on the whole, and that in some units with considerable sickness casualty rates were as high as 60 percent.

On 15 May 1974 the Division's 28th Regiment and the 95th Regiment, 325th Division overran Dak Pek Camp.

During the 1975 Spring Offensive, as a diversion for the attack on Ban Me Thuot, the division attacked Duc Lap Camp on 9 March, capturing the base the next day. The PAVN claim to have captured over 100 prisoners, 14 artillery pieces and 20 tanks and armored personnel carriers. On 10 March the Division's 24th Regiment participated in the attack on Ban Me Thuot. On 13 March the Division's 28th and 66th Regiments arrived by truck from Duc Lap and joined the attack. The 24th Regiment supported by tanks attacked the ARVN 45th Regiment, 23rd Division on Hill 581 1 mile (1.6 km) east of Phung Duc scattering them, killing over 200 soldiers and ending the hopes for a counterattack to retake Ban Me Thuot. On 16 March the 24th Regiment and 8th battalion, 66th Regiment overran the Nong Trai intersection held by the ARVN 45th Regiment and the next the 24th and 28th Regiments assaulted down Route 21 overrunning the ARVN 44th Regiment and Regional Force units. The division continued its advance down Route 21 attacking the ARVN 40th Regiment 22nd Division and Regional Forces and capturing Khanh Duong by 24 March.

On 29 March 1975 the PAVN formed 3rd Corps comprising the division, 316th and 320th Divisions, the 675th Artillery Regiment, the 312th Anti-aircraft Regiment, 198th Sapper Regiment, 273rd Tank Regiment, 545th Engineer Regiment and the 29th Signal Regiment under the command of Major General Vũ Lăng. The division attacked the ARVN 3rd Airborne Brigade in the M'Đrăk Pass and then captured Cam Ranh Bay and Cam Ranh Air Base on 3 April. On 10 April the division left Cam Ranh and moved along Route 450 to join up with Route 11 to take Dalat, passing within 12 miles (19 km) of Phan Rang Air Base. When Republic of Vietnam Air Force (RVNAF) reconnaissance aircraft observed the movement of the division, Phan Rang based A-37s began attacking the column, destroying 6 river-crossing vehicles on 10 April, 5 trucks on 11 April, 7 trucks on 12 April and 9 trucks on 13 April.

By mid-April the lead elements of 3rd Corps were located at Dầu Tiếng Base Camp ready to attack the northern approaches to Saigon. On 29 April the division advanced down Highway 1 and attacked ARVN forces at the Quang Trung National Training Center. By midnight on 29/30 April the division's advanced elements had reached the Ba Queo intersection and began attacking Tan Son Nhut Air Base. At 07:15 on 30 April the 24th Regiment supported by tanks approached the Bay Hien intersection (10.793°N 106.653°E) 1.5 km from the base's main gate. The lead T-54 was hit by M67 recoilless rifle and then the next T-54 was hit by a shell from an M48 tank. The PAVN infantry moved forward and engaged the ARVN in house to house fighting forcing them to withdraw to the base by 08:45. The division then sent three tanks and an infantry battalion to assault the main gate and they were met by intensive anti-tank and machine gun fire knocking out the three tanks and killing at least 20 PAVN soldiers. The PAVN tried to bring forward an 85mm antiaircraft gun but the ARVN knocked it out before it could start firing. The division ordered 8 more tanks and another infantry battalion to join the attack, but as they approached the Bay Hien intersection they were hit by an airstrike from RVNAF jets operating from Binh Thuy Air Base which destroyed two T-54s. The six surviving tanks arrived at the main gate at 10:00 and began their attack, with two being knocked out by antitank fire in front of the gate and another destroyed as it attempted a flanking manoeuvre. At approximately 10:30 the 81st Ranger Group defending the base heard of the surrender broadcast of President Dương Văn Minh and withdrew from the base gates and at 11:30 the division entered the base.
