= War of the flags =

Part of the Vietnam War (1973)

War of the Flags
- Part of the Vietnam War
Date	23 January – 3 February 1973
Location	throughout South Vietnam
Result	South Vietnamese victory

Belligerents
North Vietnam; Viet Cong	South Vietnam; United States (until 28 January)

Casualties and losses
5,000+	Unknown

The War of the Flags (also known as Landgrab '73) was a phase of fighting throughout South Vietnam lasting from 23 January to 3 February 1973 as the forces of North and South Vietnam each sought to maximize the territory under their control before the ceasefire in place agreed by the Paris Peace Accords came into effect at 8:00 on 28 January 1973 (local time). The fighting continued past the ceasefire date and into early February. South Vietnamese forces made greater territorial gains and inflicted significant losses on the North Vietnamese forces.

== Background ==
At the end of the Easter Offensive in October 1972 both the Army of the Republic of Vietnam (ARVN) and the People's Army of Vietnam (PAVN) had suffered severe losses and were exhausted. The PAVN had gained permanent control of large areas of the four northernmost provinces – Quảng Trị, Thừa Thiên, Quảng Nam and Quảng Tín – and the western fringes of the II and III Corps sectors, totalling around 10% of South Vietnam.

The Paris Peace Talks resumed in October 1972 and the outline of the peace agreement was announced on 26 October 1972. One of the sticking points in the negotiations was North Vietnam's insistence that there should be a ceasefire in place, with the PAVN and Vietcong (VC) retaining control of the areas they occupied. South Vietnamese president Nguyễn Văn Thiệu opposed the continued PAVN occupation, but was coerced by the Nixon Administration to agree to this condition. The final terms of the peace accords were agreed by the parties on 23 January 1973, with signing to take place on 27 January and a country-wide ceasefire in place coming into effect on at 24:00 GMT on 27 January. A joint military commission of South Vietnamese and VC representatives established under the terms of the accords would determine the areas controlled by each side, which was replaced by the International Commission of Control and Supervision (ICCS), composed of representatives from Canada, Indonesia, Hungary and Poland.

MACV and South Vietnamese intelligence learned that the PAVN/VC planned general attacks throughout South Vietnam to take place immediately before the expected date of the ceasefire so as to maximize the areas under their control in the expectation that the ICCS monitors would be in place around the country and able to confirm PAVN/VC control and so forestall any South Vietnamese counterattacks. The ARVN prepared for these attacks and planned attacks of its own to regain ground ahead of the ceasefire. The US continued to support the South Vietnamese, principally with air strikes, until the ceasefire came into effect.

== Battle ==
=== I Corps ===
By late October 1972 the ARVN had recaptured Quảng Trị and held a line along the Thạch Hãn River. An attempt to advance to the south bank of the Cam Lộ/Cửa Việt River was repulsed in November. On 15 January 1973 the South Vietnamese Joint General Staff began planning began for a final assault by South Vietnamese Marines and ARVN to capture the south bank of the Cam Lộ/Cửa Việt River and the Cửa Việt Base. The attack was launched on the morning of 26 January and by 07:00 on 28 January the South Vietnamese had recaptured the base. At 08:00 Indochina Time on 28 January the ceasefire came into effect and US support for the operation ceased. On the evening of 29 January the PAVN counterattacked and by 31 January had recaptured the base. South Vietnamese losses were 40 killed and they claim to have inflicted over 1000 PAVN casualties.

South and west of Quảng Trị the PAVN B5 Front forces prevented any expansion of the ARVN Airborne Division's positions into the hills south of the Thạch Hãn River and against the Thạch Hãn River line itself. The PAVN built up their defenses in the highlands north of the Thạch Hãn River and west of Quảng Trị. Elements of the PAVN 304th Division were shifted to this sector, and additional antiaircraft units were brought into the B5 Front, so that by the end of January elements of at least 11 antiaircraft regiments were deployed in northwestern Quảng Trị Province. In late January 1973 elements of the PAVN 263rd SAM Regiment, equipped with SA-2 missiles, deployed to the former Khe Sanh Combat Base. The regiment had four firing battalions, each equipped with four to six launchers and one support battalion. The regiment was apparently deployed to protect the PAVN logistics hub of the Ho Chi Minh Trail, the A Sầu Valley and Route 9.

Further south in Thừa Thiên Province, on 24 January elements of the 803rd Regiment, 324B Division moved into the lowlands south of Camp Evans and north of Huế. On 25 January artillery and ground attacks began against ARVN positions around Huế. Between 27 January and 3 February elements of the 803rd Regiment attempted to interdict Highway 1 in the vicinity of the An Lo bridge. The PAVN captured a number of hamlets before being ejected by ARVN forces, losing over 200 killed. South of Huế, the PAVN 5th and 6th Regiments attacked the lowlands around Phu Bai Combat Base, gaining temporary control of several hamlets before being ejected and losing 175 killed.

In the PAVN's Military Region 5 which was responsible for Quảng Nam, Quảng Tín and Quảng Ngãi Provinces both the PAVN and VC overextended themselves and could not secure their gains. Intelligence sources revealed that the PAVN expected its main forces to be able to contain the ARVN in its bases and thereby permit local forces to invest the hamlets and villages.

In Quảng Nam Province, Front-4 had completed its preparations for the attacks by 22 January, including having the 575th Artillery Battalion move rockets into four firing positions for attacks against Da Nang. Fighting began on the morning of 26 January with a ground attack against Duc Duc and a rocket attack against Da Nang. Numerous attacks by fire and infantry assault were simultaneously conducted against ARVN positions and lines of communication throughout the province, and all district headquarters in Quảng Nam Province were hit. Da Nang received rocket attacks for three consecutive days. The PAVN supported the VC infiltrating the hamlets and villages and VC flags were observed in the hamlets of western Hieu Due District, southern and western Đại Lộc District, Điện Bàn District, northeastern Duc Duc, western Duy Xuyên District and parts of northern Quế Sơn District. Subsequent ARVN operations recovered some of these outlying villages and hamlets; the final result probably correctly reflected the relative military balance and political influence in the area.

In Quảng Tín Province the PAVN 711th Division was committed to defending its important base area in the Hiệp Đức District and played no offensive role. On 27 December the ARVN 3rd Division launched a spoiling attack against the Hiệp Đức base. Deep penetrations were made in the first few days and the I Corps Commander, Lt. Gen. Ngô Quang Trưởng, sought to exploit the early success by detaching the 51st Infantry Regiment from the 1st Division and on 3 January sent it to reinforce the 3rd Division. On 16 January the 3rd Division commander Maj. Gen. Nguyen Duy Hinh, committed the 51st Regiment to continue the attack to seize the former Firebase West on Hill 1460 (15.585°N 108.193°E) guarding the eastern approach to Hiệp Đức. The 51st was able to advance only part way up Hill 1460 and could not dislodge the PAVN infantry holding the crest. Meanwhile, elements of the 3rd Division's 2nd Regiment were across the Quế Sơn Valley and had seized the hill above Chau Son, thus controlling Route 534 into Hiệp Đức. On 24 January, the 3rd Division's attack continued, the objective was the former Firebase O'Connor (15.578°N 108.141°E) on high ground just east of Hiệp Đức. On 26 January, with the ceasefire imminent and VC forces moving into the populated lowlands of Quảng Nam, the 3rd Division had to terminate its attack. A strong counterattack by the 711th Division forces still on Firebase West prevented the 3d Division's infantry from gaining Firebase O'Connor, but the heavy casualties sustained by the 71lth demoralized and weakened it severely. By the end of January, 3rd Division troops were busy clearing VC forces from the hamlets west and southwest of Da Nang, and by the end of the month only one hamlet remained under PAVN/VC influence in Đại Lộc District.

In Quảng Ngai Province between 23 and 26 January VC forces infiltrated into assembly areas in the lowlands and on 27 January attacked throughout the lowlands, rocketing the provincial and district capitals, interdicting Highway 1 and overrunning several Regional Force and Popular Force outposts. In southern Quảng Ngai, the PAVN 52nd Regiment, 2nd Division, established defenses around the district town of Ba Tơ, which it had controlled since the fall of 1972. Rather than challenge this position, the ARVN deployed to prevent the 52nd Regiment from moving toward the lowlands. Holding its 1st Regiment in reserve, the PAVN 2nd Division used one battalion to support VC forces in Mộ Đức District, kept one battalion in the base area, and deployed the third to support the attack of the 141st Regiment in Duc Tho District. On 27 January the 141st Regiment, supported by two battalions of the PAVN 12th Regiment, 3rd Division reached Highway 1 south of Duc Tho and secured the rest of the district south to the border of Bình Định Province, including Sa Huỳnh Base, in which two battalions of the PAVN 12th Regiment, 3rd Division, supported the attack of the 2nd Division. Since the PAVN had blocked the only north - south line of communication and had secured a seaport, however small and undeveloped, in the center of the country, the South Vietnamese could hardly permit this situation to go unchallenged. Vigorous counterattacks succeeded in driving the PAVN from Sa Huỳnh by 16 February. PAVN losses were estimated to be in excess of 600 killed. Despite having seized Sa Huỳnh only the day before the ceasefire, the PAVN were outraged at being ejected from lands they "legitimately" occupied at the moment of ceasefire.

=== II Corps ===
The southern part of PAVN Military Region 5 included Bình Định, Phú Yên and Khánh Hòa Provinces. South Vietnamese intelligence determined that the PAVN's objectives were to isolate the northern districts of Bình Định, hold the ARVN 22nd Division in its bases, cut Highway 1 and gain control of as much land and as many people as possible. From the PAVN viewpoint the prospects for success seemed good, for large segments of the population in the coastal areas of Bình Định and Phú Yên had long been sympathetic to the VC, and the ARVN 22nd Division had yet to establish any reputation for excellence in battle. Since the area along Highway 1 was fairly densely populated, it would provide a significant population base.

Fighting started in northeast Bình Định on 23 January 1973, when elements of the PAVN 12th Regiment, 3rd Division, moved from bases in the An Lão valley toward the Tam Quan lowlands. Beginning on the 24th and lasting until the 28th, the attacks were designed to fix the ARVN 41st Regiment in its bases and support the attack of the PAVN 2nd Division just to the north at Sa Huynh. South of the Lai Giang River, in Hoài Ân District, the rest of the PAVN 3rd Division attacked government outposts and attempted to prevent the deployment of the 22nd Division. On 28 January, the VC began their attacks along Highway 1 and in the hamlets and villages, successfully cutting the highway just south of the Bồng Sơn pass and in several places in Phú Yên Province. Farther south, in Khánh Hòa, other attempts to cut Highway 1 were unsuccessful. Although contacts were light and scattered in Khánh Hòa Province, the PAVN/VC succeeded in interdicting Highway 21, temporarily isolating Ban Me Thuot from the coast. By 28 January, a number of hamlets in Phú Yên were under PAVN/VC control, but hard fighting by RF and PF succeeded by 2 February in eliminating PAVN/VC control in all but two hamlets. By the 5th all of Highway 1 was back under government control, although the route remained closed to traffic until all destroyed bridges were repaired.

Although the PAVN/VC seemed to enjoy great chances for success in Bình Định and Phú Yên Provinces, it was clear by the first week of February that they had failed to achieve any significant gains and the PAVN/VC forces had incurred extremely heavy losses.

The PAVN's B3 Front included Kontum, Pleiku, Phu Bon and Darlac Provinces, part of Quang Duc Province and western districts of Bình Định Province. Objectives assigned to PAVN/VC forces in B3 Front were similar to those in southern MR 5: to hold the ARVN 23rd Division in place, isolate the cities of Kontum, Pleiku, and Ban Me Thuot and interdict the main highways. Attaining these objectives would effectively extend control over the population of the Central Highlands. The PAVN/VC waited until the night of 26 January to make their moves into the hamlets and villages, and not until the morning of the ceasefire did the attacks reach full intensity. The timing meant that the ARVN would have to conduct its counterattacks after the ceasefire and so in theory would be subject to ICCS observation and control.

Preparations for occupying the villages and hamlets in the highlands began on 20 and 21 January when elements of both PAVN divisions, the 10th and 320th, began attacks to tie down ARVN defenders. On 20 January the 320th Division attacked Đức Cơ Camp and by the next day controlled the camp. On 27 January the 24th and 28th Regiments, 10th Division attacked Polei Krong and Trung Nghia, forcing the ARVN 85th Ranger Border Defense Battalion to withdraw from Polei Krong on the 28th.

On 26 January, in coordination with the Polei Krong and Trung Nghia attack, the 95B Regiment, 10th Division, seized Highway 14 where it traversed the Chu Pao Pass and held on until 10 February. Farther south, in Darlac Province, a bridge on Highway 14 near Buôn Hồ was destroyed and several hamlets infiltrated. Contact with Ban Me Thuot by way of Highway 14 was interrupted until about 14 February. The VC Gia Lai Provincial Unit closed Highway 19 at the Pleiku-Bình Định border and maintained the block until 4 February. South of Pleiku City, elements of the 320th Division were successful in closing Highway 14 temporarily. Pleiku City itself received repeated attacks by 122mm rockets on 28 January, but damage was light.

The PAVN/VC failed to hold the occupied villages and sustained heavy losses and their military effectiveness decreased significantly. The most important gain was the recapture of Đức Cơ in time to receive the ICCS, this achievement aside, by mid-February the military balance in the highlands was generally the same as it had been at the end of December 1972.

PAVN Military Region 6 included five South Vietnamese provinces, the mountain provinces of Tuyen Duc and Lâm Đồng and the coastal provinces of Ninh Thuận, Bình Thuận and Bình Tuy. This was a sparsely populated region and relatively isolated from the war. The ARVN had no regular forces deployed there and the RF and PF maintained effective control. The PAVN/VC in MR 6 had only four PAVN infantry battalions, one PAVN artillery battalion, and two VC infantry battalions, all of them weak and understrength. Action began on the night of 26 January with an attack on a hamlet north of Da Lat, the capital of Tuyen Duc. Another PAVN/VC force attempted unsuccessfully to enter a hamlet north of Phan Thiết in Bình Thuận. Although local forces interdicted Highway 20 east of Bao Lac in Lâm Đồng Province, South Vietnamese forces cleared the route by 30 January. Another thrust was repulsed with heavy losses at Tánh Linh District town in Bình Tuy on 27 January. On the morning of the 28th, the day the ceasefire was to become effective, the number of hamlets entered increased significantly, especially in Bình Thuận, but a PAVN battalion entering a suburb of Da Lat was quickly ejected. The RF and PF performed capably, and by the end of January the situation was clearly under South Vietnamese control. Highway 1 through the coastal provinces was never successfully cut, and the only lasting result of the campaign was the serious depletion of the PAVN/VC's local force battalions.

=== III Corps ===
The PAVN's Eastern Nam Bo Region was roughly the same as South Vietnam's III Corps (Bình Tuy, Gia Định, Hậu Nghĩa and Long An Provinces were excluded). In addition to scheduling attacks close to the ceasefire date, the PAVN in October 1972 had also learned that it lacked the strength to infiltrate the Saigon area with main forces. Operations in Eastern Nam Bo did not begin until a few days before the ceasefire was to become effective and Saigon was not an objective. As in other populated areas of South Vietnam, the PAVN's objective just before ceasefire was to extend the area under PAVN/VC control and gather more people, but in the Eastern Nam Bo region a second objective applied: to establish a suitable capital for the VC in South Vietnam. Intelligence collected in the weeks before ceasefire appeared to indicate that Tây Ninh, the capital of Tây Ninh Province had been selected; but for reasons not fully clear, the PAVN failed to allocate sufficient forces to capture the city. ARVN preemptive operations in January 1973 most likely eliminated the PAVN's capability to assign main forces to a Tây Ninh campaign. As a result, only relatively weak, local forces were available and the campaign failed.

At the end of the first two weeks in January, ARVN III Corps began an attack into the Saigon River corridor and advanced all the way to Tri Tam in the Michelin Rubber Plantation. PAVN/VC losses were estimated in excess of 400 killed. The damage and disruption caused in enemy bases in the Long Nguyen Secret Zone and the Boi Loi Woods were extensive. Heavily supported by B-52s, the ARVN disrupted the PAVN's plans for pre-ceasefire operations. The PAVN 7th Division was forced to deploy in the Michelin plantation and the ARVN contained it there during this critical time. The Michelin operation also forced the PAVN to keep major elements of the 9th Division in defensive positions around An Lộc and Lộc Ninh in Bình Long Province. Intelligence reports had indicated that the 9th was to play an important role in the Tây Ninh attacks.

The number and intensity of attacks by fire significantly increased from 23 through 25 January. Widespread attacks by fire and assault began on the 26th and 27th against ARVN and RF/PF outposts, mostly on those located in defense of major lines of communication. Among those hit were Trảng Bàng on Highway 1, the vicinity of Trảng Bom in Biên Hòa Province, the junction of Highways 1 and 20 in Long Khánh Province, Highway 13 south of Chơn Thành and north of Lái Thiêu in Bình Dương Province, Highway 15 south of Long Thành and north of Phuoc Le and Highway 23 in southern Phước Tuy Province near Đất Đỏ. PAVN/VC casualties were fairly heavy, especially along Highway 13 south of Chơn Thành, where the PAVN/VC lost over 120 killed.

The PAVN/VC attained some short-term successes, about 144 hamlets were reported contested at one time or another during the period 23–29 January 1973. Nevertheless, by 3 February only 14 hamlets remained under PAVN/VC control, and four days later all hamlets in the region were back under control of South Vietnamese forces. The line-of-communication interdictions were also short lived; all major roads were open by 1 February.

In keeping with the PAVN goal of political control, terrorist attacks during the brief campaign were few, apparently on the theory that widespread terrorism would antagonize the people. As it was, in most instances the people would leave their hamlets as the PAVN/VC forces entered and return only when South Vietnamese forces had ejected the PAVN/VC. The PAVN's political objectives were not achieved, the attempt to seize Tây Ninh never approached success, and RF/PF forces were able to clear the PAVN/VC from out lying hamlets with only minimal assistance from the ARVN. The cost of the campaign for the PAVN/VC was heavy; over 2,000 PAVN/VC troops were killed and 41 captured. A large proportion of the casualties occurred in VC forces; they were weak at the beginning and weaker still at the end.

=== IV Corps ===
On 15 January the ARVN and RF/PF forces launched Operation Dong Khoi, a six-day operation throughout the Mekong Delta, early successes led to the operation being extended for six more days. PAVN/VC losses of over 2,000 killed and disruptions in deployment and logistical activity seriously affected the PAVN's ability to launch a significant offensive. The areas the PAVN planned to capture in the Delta were those having the greatest potential for subsequent exploitation and expansion. In the northern Delta, they considered the border area with Cambodia from Hà Tiên in the west to the Parrot's Beak in the east to be most important, including northern Kiên Giang, Châu Đốc, Kien Phong, Kiến Tường and Long An Provinces. Western Hậu Nghĩa Province also had high priority as did central Định Tường Province. Highway 4 from the southwestern Delta to Saigon crossed the center of Định Tường, and the area around Mỹ Tho, the capital, was densely populated. The PAVN also wanted to extend their control in Chương Thiện Province. Having already established control in the U Minh Forest, they could anchor the terminus of an infiltration corridor from Cambodia through Kiên Giang into the lower Delta, but because of Operation Dong Khoi none of these goals would be realized.

PAVN Military Region 2 included eight of the Delta provinces; in the north, Châu Đốc, which contained the PAVN base in the Seven Mountains on the Cambodian border; to the east, Kien Phong and Kiến Tường, with the vast marshy area of the Plain of Reeds; to the south of these three border provinces, the central Mekong provinces of An Giang and Sa Đéc, whose dense populations were under relatively strong South Vietnamese influence and control, and the vital, populous province of Định Tường and in the far south, the coastal provinces of Kien Hoa and Gò Công. PAVN operations began on 23 January when two battalions of the PAVN 207th Regiment crossed the Cambodian border into northern Kien Phong Province. This invasion coincided with at least 13 light attacks by fire and ground probes. Two PAVN soldiers captured that day revealed that the PAVN's intention was to capture the district town of Hồng Ngự, destroy all government posts along the border, intercept South Vietnamese relief columns, and then extend the attack southward deep into Kien Phong Province. Attacks were recorded along the entire border. In one of many sharp engagements northeast of Cai Cai Camp, South Vietnamese casualties were light but the PAVN lost 32 killed and 2 captured. In heavy fighting on the 25th, the ARVN again incurred light casualties but killed 47 PAVN. PAVN losses in less than three days exceeded 100 killed in exchange for only minor ground advances. Following this flurry of attacks, the fighting in Kien Phong Province abated and remained so until the eve of the ceasefire. South Vietnamese bases were subjected only to sporadic light attacks by fire.

In Định Tường Province, despite a heavy concentration of PAVN main force units in the center of the province (the 5th and 6th Divisions, the E1, 6th, DT1 and 320th Regiments, and possibly elements of the 174th Regiment), the level of activity was surprisingly low. Even on 28 and 29 January, when the number of attacks approximately doubled, the weight of the attacks remained low. Although ground contact was made with elements of the 174th Regiment in the area known as Tri Phap, these contacts subsided after the ceasefire, probably attributable to high PAVN casualties.

In eastern Định Tường and Gò Công Provinces a prisoner reported that main forces, including the PAVN 88th and 24th Regiments, were to break down into small units and conduct political activity among the population. This tactic was to create the impression that the local forces were everywhere throughout the Delta and would support PAVN political activity. The troops had instructions to limit the use of heavy weapons and thus gain more credibility as local guerrillas. Local South Vietnamese forces responded effectively to this campaign and the PAVN achieved no significant gains.

The PAVN's Military Region 3 included the nine provinces of the lower Delta. Kiên Giang, on the Cambodian border. was the northernmost. The Delta capital and the headquarters for the ARVN IV Corps was at Cần Thơ in the central Mekong province of Phong Dinh. The PAVN's only relatively secure and uncontested base area in the Delta was in MR 3, the U Minh Forest, a vast mangrove swamp and forest extending across the border of Kiên Giang and An Xuyên Provinces on the coast of the Gulf of Thailand.

As elsewhere in the Delta, activity in MR 3 increased sharply on 23 January. Well over half of the incidents reported were harassments and attacks by fire against South Vietnamese posts. In the northwest, the PAVN 1st Division sent troops across the frontier from Cambodia with the apparent purpose of having them in position for the kickoff of operations at the time of the ceasefire. Documents captured in sharp fighting near Hà Tiên in northwestern Kiên Giang were identified as belonging to a battalion of the 52nd Regiment, 1st Division and subsequent interrogation of a captured prisoner confirmed the battalion's presence as well as those of the regimental headquarters and a second battalion. The prisoner described the regiment's low morale; many of the soldiers had recently been released from military hospitals. and the general health or the unit was low. The regiment's mission was to occupy the Hà Tiên area and show the VC flag prior to the ceasefire. Combined operations employing the Republic of Vietnam Air Force and the Rangers pushed the 52nd back into Cambodia. Air strikes killed more than 70 soldiers of the 52nd and ground fighting accounted for at least 15 more.

The PAVN's 44th Sapper Regiment, also subordinate to the 1st Division, began operations in the Seven Mountains of Châu Đốc on 15 January with attacks by fire against South Vietnamese posts. The 44th moved into the Seven Mountains near Tri Tôn on 23 January to occupy as much territory and gain control of as much population as possible, but ARVN counter-operations again prevented any significant successes. The third element of the PAVN 1st Division, the 101D Regiment, apparently remained in its base in the Seven Mountains and contributed only with attacks by fire.

The highest level of PAVN activity in MR 3 occurred in Chương Thiện Province. Four PAVN regiments were available to converge on the province capital, Vị Thanh. The PAVN 18B Regiment was to the northwest, the 95A Sapper Regiment was south along with elements of the D2 Regiment and part of the D1 Regiment was in eastern Chương Thiện near the Phong Dinh Province border. The PAVN headquarters for MR 3 was in the center of the province. The number and intensity or attacks increased sharply on 26 January, including a series of mortar and rocket attacks, some with 120mm mortars, southwest of Y Tang. The activity increased again on 27 January and a number of outposts and district towns experienced ground attacks and attacks by fire. Contingents of the D2 Regiment penetrated the district town of Long Mỹ as far as the marketplace before they could be driven out. On the same day Kien Thien received a heavy bombardment followed by a ground attack by elements of the 95A Sapper Regiment, this attack was also repelled. At Kien Hung, through the nights or 27 and 28 January the 18B Regiment conducted attacks by fire. By the morning of 28 January the town was surrounded by PAVN troops, but South Vietnamese forces successfully held. The province capital, Vị Thanh, received sporadic attacks by fire, but casualties and damage were light.

Attacks were widespread to the far south, primarily against RF/PF outposts and district towns, but in no case did the situation change markedly from that before the campaign got under way. The activity appeared to crest by midday on 28 January, and a general uneasy quiet followed. During the campaign at least 125 hamlets came under PAVN attack, but no more than 20 were ever being contested at anyone time. No main lines of communication were ever threatened and all major roads and canals remained open to traffic. Assassinations and other terrorism lagged. Nowhere in the Mekong Delta did the PAVN make any significant or lasting gain. In the face of the highly successful Operation Dong Khoi, the PAVN apparently realized that major territorial acquisitions were impossible.

== Aftermath ==
The operations of late January and early February 1973 followed the patterns established in October 1972 when a ceasefire had appeared imminent, except that the PAVN waited until much closer to the date of the ceasefire to start the campaign. Otherwise, the objectives and techniques were substantially the same: main force units generally defended the territory already under control and attacked to fix ARVN regulars in their bases, while local PAVN/VC units entered the hamlets.

Throughout South Vietnam, the ARVN claimed the campaign between 28 January and 9 February cost the PAVN/VC over 5,000 killed in exchange for little alteration in the situation that existed in mid-January. By 9 February, only 23 of more than 400 hamlets attacked were still reported as contested. U.S. observers at MACV in Saigon attributed the PAVN's failures to tactical errors, the limited capabilities of the local forces and an outstanding performance by the South Vietnamese. The PAVN had erred in delaying pre-ceasefire operations in the expectation that the South Vietnamese would be deterred in counterattacking by the presence of ICCS observers. The PAVN committed their other important strategic mistake by breaking down the local forces into small units and attacking at so many places. thereby reducing the staying capacity of any local unit. The ARVN and local RF and PF were able to react deliberately against these hamlet challenges and to eliminate them one by one. The PAVN's local forces were suffered heavy losses. South Vietnamese forces had clearly learned much of the PAVN's strategy and objectives from October 1972 and had planned accordingly. According to the U.S., the campaign demonstrated that South Vietnam's armed forces could probably hold their own against the force the North had at that time on the southern battlefields, and that the military balance in South Vietnam was close to even.
