= Plei Krong Dam =

Coordinates: 14.4085°N 107.8629°E

The Plei Krong Dam rests at the confluence of the Krong Poko and Dak Bla rivers in Vietnam. Construction of the dam and an associated power plant began in 2003; the plant produces 417 million kiloWatt hours to the surrounding region. During dam construction in 2004, the Vietnam News Agency reported that 581 families were to be displaced from the left bank of the Krong Poko in January 2005 to make way for the dam.
