= Battle of Quang Duc =

Part of the Vietnam War (1973)

- Part of the Vietnam War
Date	30 October – 10 December 1973
Location	Quang Duc Province, South Vietnam
Result	South Vietnamese victory

Belligerents
North Vietnam	South Vietnam

Commanders and leaders
	General Nguyễn Văn Toàn; Col. Nguyen Hau Thien

Strength
205th Regiment; 271st Regiment; 429th Sapper Regiment; 208th Artillery Regiment; 20th Tank Battalion; 46th Reconnaissance Battalion	4 Regional Force battalions 44th Infantry Regiment; 45th Infantry Regiment; 53rd Infantry Regiment; 21st Ranger Battalion

The Battle of Quang Duc took place from 30 October to 10 December 1973 when North Vietnamese forces attempted to occupy part of Quang Duc Province to expand their logistical network from Cambodia into South Vietnam. While the North Vietnamese attacks were initially successful they were eventually forced out by the South Vietnamese.

== Background ==
Quang Duc Province was important commercially for its vast timber resources and militarily for both sides in the war because of the lines of communication that passed through it. After the People's Army of Vietnam (PAVN) had closed surface travel from Saigon to Phước Long by the direct route through Bình Dương Province, the only land access available to the South Vietnamese was via Ban Me Thuot and Quang Duc. As far as the PAVN was concerned, Quang Duc was essential to the extension of its Route 14 out of Mondulkiri Province, Cambodia, and Darlac Province, South Vietnam.

Because Army of the Republic of Vietnam (ARVN) forces controlled Highway 14 as far south and west from Ban Me Thuot as the Tuy Đức crossroads (12.245°N 107.436°E), the PAVN's new Route 14 had to pass through Cambodia and reenter South Vietnam in that salient of Mondulkiri Province that juts into Quang Duc near Bu Prang. The site of the abandoned U.S. Army Special Forces Bu Prang Camp was perched atop a high, forested ridge astride Highway 14 near the Tuy Đức crossroads at the Cambodian border. Before reaching the Phuoc Long border of South Vietnam's III Corps, Highway 14 was joined at the hill town of Kien Duc (12.238°N 107.316°E) by Local Route 344, coming over from the Quang Duc Province capital of Gia Nghĩa. This road junction was vital because its control provided an alternative route from Ban Me Thuot through Dak Song and Gia Nghĩa on Provincial Route 8B. Important as well was the road junction at Dak Song (12.326°N 107.568°E), where Provincial Route 8B left Highway 14.

Until mid-May 1973 when the PAVN's projection of its new line of communication reached Bu Prang and while the South Vietnam's access to Phước Long through Quang Duc remained unthreatened, neither side paid much attention to Quang Duc. ARVN engineers were working on local roads, primarily to improve access to the timber forests in the northeast section of the province, and the only PAVN activity of any note was mining to harass and delay this project. Only three Regional Force battalions were located in the province, supported by six 105-mm. howitzer platoons (12 guns), which had had no occasion to fire since the 28 January ceasefire. Additionally, 27 Popular Force platoons were scattered about the province. These were nearly all Montagnards, and the province population was 60 percent tribal.

Around the beginning of May, a Regional Force patrol, moving out from its outpost near Bu Prang made contact with a PAVN reconnaissance party and killed four. The rest of May and June were quiet until PAVN harassment of the RF positions around Bu Prang began in early July, evidently in response to the unusually aggressive patrolling ordered by Colonel Nguyen Hau Thien, Quang Duc's province chief. Mortar attacks, accompanied by some light infantry probes, continued through July, as did RF forays into the old Bu Prang positions on the border west of the Tuy Đức crossroads. In the last week of August, Thien tried a reconnaissance in force with two RF battalions. Both met heavy resistance short of their objectives on the border and returned to camp. This inconclusive skirmishing took on an ominous note in early September when the first evidence appeared disclosing that COSVN had sent two battalions of its 271st Independent Regiment from southwest of Tây Ninh up to Quang Duc. The presence of a PAVN main force regiment was a new and dangerous development in Quang Duc. Thien asked for reinforcement and was given an RF battalion from Darlac Province. He complained about the poor performance of the Darlac battalion, and II Corps commander General Nguyễn Văn Toàn agreed to replace it with another battalion from Khanh Hoa Province. This gave Thien a force of four RF battalions, which he located at the mutually supporting bases of Bu Prang and Bu Bong (12.216°N 107.456°E), each with a platoon of 105-mm, howitzers.

The 271st Independent Regiment had been roughly handled by the ARVN and Republic of Vietnam Air Force (RVNAF) in the early months of 1973 in marsh and ricelands along the Vàm Cỏ Đông River and the Cambodian border in Hậu Nghĩa and southern Tây Ninh Provinces. COSVN had pulled it back to Cambodia in April for reorganization and recuperation. Afterwards the regimental headquarters and two of its battalions, the 8th and 9th, were trucked to Bù Đốp Camp in northern Phước Long Province, while the other, the 7th, was sent to operate under Long An Province authority. Leaving Bù Đốp, the 271st marched through Bù Gia Mập District and arrived northwest of Bu Prang in late August, ready to assist in the defense of the new line of communication and to deny the ARVN use of Highway 14 in the border region. Successive attempts by the Quang Duc territorials failed to gain any ground west of the Tuy Đức crossroads, while the rest of Quang Duc Province remained relatively quiet.

Meanwhile, PAVN preparations for the Quang Duc campaign continued. A task force headquarters, designated Unit 95, was established at Bù Đốp, and the PAVN 205th Independent Regiment was assembled there for movement to Quang Duc. The 205th had been operating since the ceasefire in South Vietnam's III Corps, and before moving to Bù Đốp it had been in northern Bình Dương Province east of the Michelin Rubber Plantation. Three more maneuver elements joined the task force at Bù Đốp before its composition was complete: the 429th Sapper Regiment, the 46th Reconnaissance Battalion, and a tank battalion (probably the 20th) from the COSVN 26th Armor Group. Artillery support was provided by the 208th Artillery Regiment, 69th Group, COSVN, which had been operating in Bình Long Province. Antiaircraft artillery, including 23 mm automatic cannons, joined the force as well as a detachment equipped with SA-7 antiaircraft missiles.

Unit 95 had reached division strength, but this was not yet realized at South Vietnam's II Corps headquarters. Given the meager defenses in Quang Duc, it was surprising that the PAVN leadership committed a force of such overwhelming size. The fact that it did so appeared to reflect the inadequacy of PAVN tactical intelligence and a respect for South Vietnamese capabilities. Such a commitment also underscored the importance attached to the principal objective-construction and protection of the line of communication. Much later South Vietnamese intelligence officers discovered that continued offensive operations by the PAVN's Quang Duc task force were designed to draw South Vietnamese forces into the province and keep them occupied, thereby reducing the forces available for employment against the PAVN's B3 Front.

By the end of September 1973, reconnaissance and survey parties from the 208th Artillery Regiment had selected firing positions and observation posts near the Tuy Đức crossroads at Bu Prang, Bu Bong and Kien Duc. Firing batteries moved into Quang Duc by the end of October with their 85 and 122 mm field guns and 120mm mortars. To ensure consistency in survey and firing, the only maps authorized for use in the 208th Artillery were the 1:50,000 series printed in Hanoi. The PAVN 205th Infantry Regiment, with the 429th Sapper Regiment attached, arrived in assembly areas near Bu Prang in mid-October and on 23 October the 208th Artillery began a five-day rehearsal preparatory to the attack. Meanwhile, the 271st Regiment with the 46th Reconnaissance Battalion moved toward Dak Song.

== Battle ==
The 208th Artillery began softening up Bu Prang and Bu Bong on 30 October. Each day 122 mm rockets and mortar and artillery shells fell on the two camps. The camp commander kept his four RF battalions outside the perimeter, patrolling near the Tuy Đức crossroads and the local defense of the two positions was the responsibility of an RF company, an engineer platoon and the two platoons of artillery. The attack began just before dawn on 4 November. The PAVN 205th Regiment, with the 429th Sappers and two companies of tanks and armored personnel carriers, overran the badly outnumbered and outgunned defenders. They destroyed two ARVN howitzers, towed the other two away and outside the camps dispersed the four RF battalions. During the assault on Bu Bong, the commander of the PAVN 205th Regiment was seriously wounded and had to be evacuated.

Toàn responded rapidly to the situation in Quang Duc Province, although he had only sketchy information concerning the PAVN's strength and dispositions. He immediately ordered the ARVN 23rd Division to pull the 53rd Infantry out of western Kontum Province and get it started toward Ban Me Thuot. As this order was being executed the PAVN attacked Dak Song on Route 8B, the only land access to Quang Duc from Ban Me Thuot. The defenses at Dak Song crumbled under assault of the PAVN 271st Regiment and Gia Nghĩa, the province capital, was cut off. But the 53rd Infantry was on the way and by 8 November, its 1st Battalion was approaching Dak Song. The 2nd Battalion, 53rd Infantry, was flown into Nhon Co airfield (11.9787°N 107.565°E) west of Gia Nghĩa and began moving north on Highway 14 toward Bu Prang and Bu Bong.

Meanwhile, the PAVN 205th Regiment began executing the next phase of its orders: it turned over the defense of the newly won positions at Bu Prang and Bu Bong to another element of the task force and began deploying south generally along Highway 14 from Bu Prang toward the Doan Van bridge. In the early morning of 14 November, the PAVN 3rd Battalion, 205th Regiment, with a platoon of tanks hit the defensive perimeter of the ARVN 2nd Battalion, 53rd Infantry. The 2nd Battalion held, knocking out two tanks and capturing nine crew-served weapons and 27 automatic rifles. The PAVN left 100 dead on the field. A second attack was repulsed the next day with moderate losses to the PAVN. The 3rd Battalion, 205th Regiment, had to be withdrawn as only 100 effective soldiers remained in the ranks. Despite these serious losses the 205th continued its advance south toward Kien Duc. With only the 2nd and 3rd Battalions available (the 1st was still engaged near Dak Song), the ARVN 53rd Infantry prepared to defend the Kien Duc road junction. The 205th Regiment began probing these defenses on 21 November. On the 23rd PAVN leaflets were found around Kien Duc, signed by the Commander in Chief VC Forces, advising the South Vietnamese to stop trying to retake Bu Prang, Bu Bong and Dak Song and threatening to attack Gia Nghĩa with tanks if the South Vietnamese persisted.

While skirmishing took place around Bu Prang, Dak Song, and Kien Duc, Toàn continued to send forces to Quang Duc. The 21st Ranger Group and the 44th and 45th Infantry Regiments of the 23rd Division began their deployments. In the highlands, the 22nd Division pulled back from western Pleiku in order to assume the defense of Kontum, vacated by the departing 23rd Division. On 28 November the 44th Infantry Regiment with a battalion of Rangers, attacked into Dak Song, forcing the withdrawal of the reinforced PAVN 271st Regiment, which pulled back toward Duc An, leaving blocking elements on Route 8B.

On 4 December the 205th Regiment, reinforced with the 429th Sappers and supported by tanks and the 208th Artillery Regiment, attacked the Kien Duc road junction, wounding the regimental commander and forcing the elements of the 53rd Infantry to withdraw 6 km east to Nhon Co airfield. Casualties were moderately heavy on both sides; the 53rd lost 40 killed, 40 wounded, and 80 missing. The 205th quickly began to replace some of its losses; about 100 fresh troops, recently arrived from North Vietnam, joined the regiment at Kien Duc on 8 December.

Toàn flew to Saigon to report on the Quang Duc situation to President Nguyễn Văn Thiệu and General Cao Văn Viên. Thiệu told him not to be concerned about lost outposts, but to direct his efforts to the destruction of the PAVN forces in Quang Duc. That same day Toàn ordered the 23rd Division commander to put his command post in Gia Nghĩa and to fly his 45th Regiment to Nhon Co. Within hours six C-130s landed elements of the 23rd Division at Nhon Co, although the airfield there was under intermittent artillery and rocket attack. That night and the next day, the 21st Rangers removed the last road blocks on Route 8B south of Dak Song. Casualties were heavy, but the first convoy since September soon rolled into Gia Nghĩa from Ban Me Thuot.

Although the commander of the 53rd Infantry had recovered from his wound and asked for the mission of retaking Kien Duc, Colonel Tuong, commanding the division, assigned the task to the 45th Infantry. This regiment was fresh, while the 53rd's battalions had been in nearly constant action for a month. Following an intense and effective artillery and air preparation, the 23rd Division's Reconnaissance Company and the 3rd Battalion, 45th Infantry, led the attack into the trenches, bunkers, and rubble at the Kien Duc road junction. The PAVN 205th Regiment was forced to withdraw with heavy losses; its 1st Battalion lost 40 percent of its strength at Kien Duc, and its sapper company was so decimated that it was disbanded after the battle. A rallier later reported that the 205th lost more than 200 killed and 400 wounded in its Quang Duc campaign.

== Aftermath ==
The 23rd Division, using its 44th Regiment continued operations during December and early January, primarily in the Bu Prang-Bu Bong area against the PAVN 271st Regiment's forces remaining there. With the route again secured from Ban Me Thuot through Gia Nghĩa to Phước Long. Toàn's responsibilities in the highlands and Bình Định Province demanded that the 23rd Division leave Quang Duc Province to deal with more pressing threats.

In Quang Duc the PAVN exploited the benefits of prolonged and detailed preparation and capitalized on its ability to concentrate overwhelming force against lightly defended objectives. Although these factors combined to produce success in the initial battles, the South Vietnamese, employing rapid air deployment, close air support and artillery fire, and its experienced regular infantry won the campaign. The PAVN was denied the use of Highway 14 through Quang Duc, its line of communications in the border region around the Tuy Đức crossroads remained subject to harassment and interdiction, and the South Vietnamese were able to regain and keep control of the logistical route to Phước Long. Quang Duc proved once again that the South Vietnamese, provided sufficient ammunition, fuel and maintenance support, could overcome the traditional advantages enjoyed by the attacker.
