= Nghĩa Hành district =

Coordinates: 14.917°N 108.750°E

Nghĩa Hành district Huyện Nghĩa Hành
- District
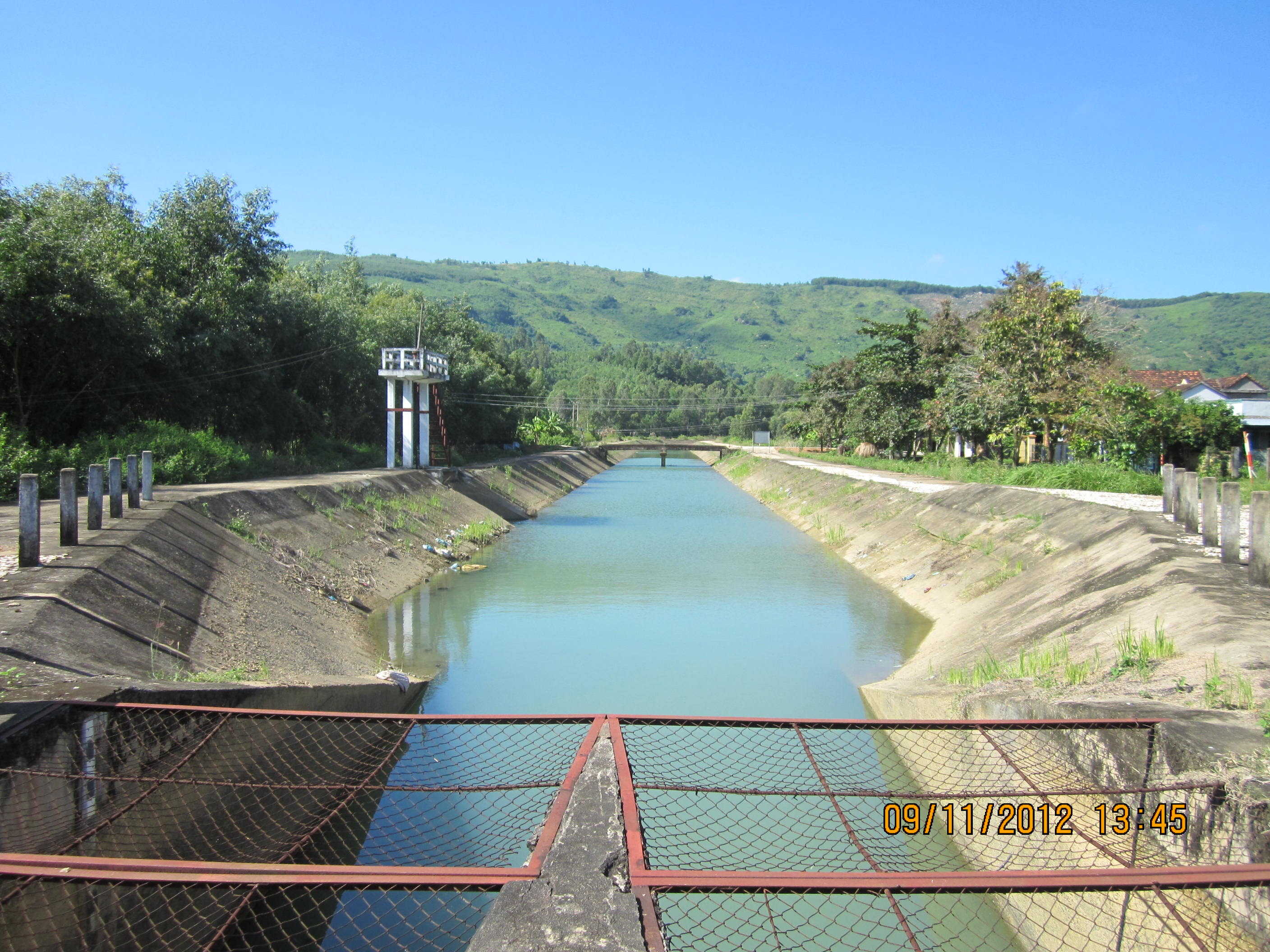
- Sông Vệ damn in Nghĩa Hành District (Nghĩa Hành)
- Interactive map of Nghĩa Hành district
- Country: Vietnam
- Region: South Central Coast
- Province: Quảng Ngãi
- Capital: Chợ Chùa

Area
  - Total: 90 sq mi (234 km^{2})

Population (2003)
  - Total: 98,156
- Time zone: UTC+7 (UTC + 7)

Nghĩa Hành is a former rural district (huyện) of Quảng Ngãi province in the South Central Coast region of Vietnam. As of 2003 the district had a population of 98,156. The district covers an area of 234 km^{2}. The district capital lies at Chợ Chùa.
