= Plei Djereng Camp =

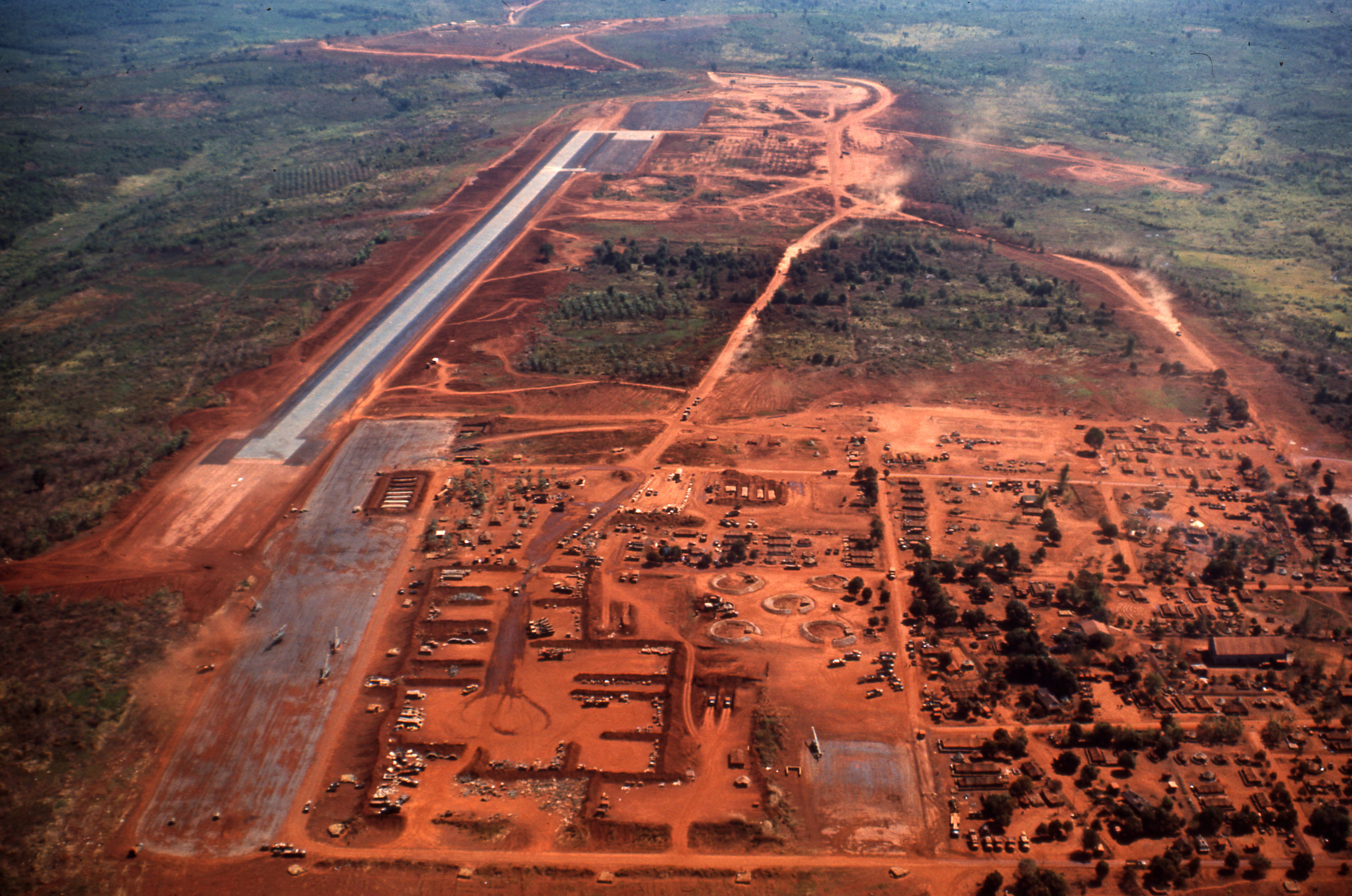
- Plei Djereng Camp, 5 February 1967

Site information
- Type: Army Base

Location
- Coordinates: 13.97°N 107.642°E

Site history
- Built: 1964
- In use: 1964-73
- Battles/wars: Vietnam War

Garrison information
- Occupants: 5th Special Forces Group; 1st Brigade, 4th Infantry Division; 80th Border Rangers

Plei Djereng New Airfield
- IATA: none; ICAO: none

Summary
- Elevation AMSL: 955 ft (291 m)
- Interactive map of Plei Djereng New Airfield

Runways
Direction	Length		Surface
Direction	ft	m	Surface
	3,150	960	PSP

Plei Djereng Camp (also known as Plei Djereng Special Forces Camp or Le Minh Camp) is a former U.S. Army and Army of the Republic of Vietnam (ARVN) base northwest of Pleiku in the Central Highlands of Vietnam.

== History ==
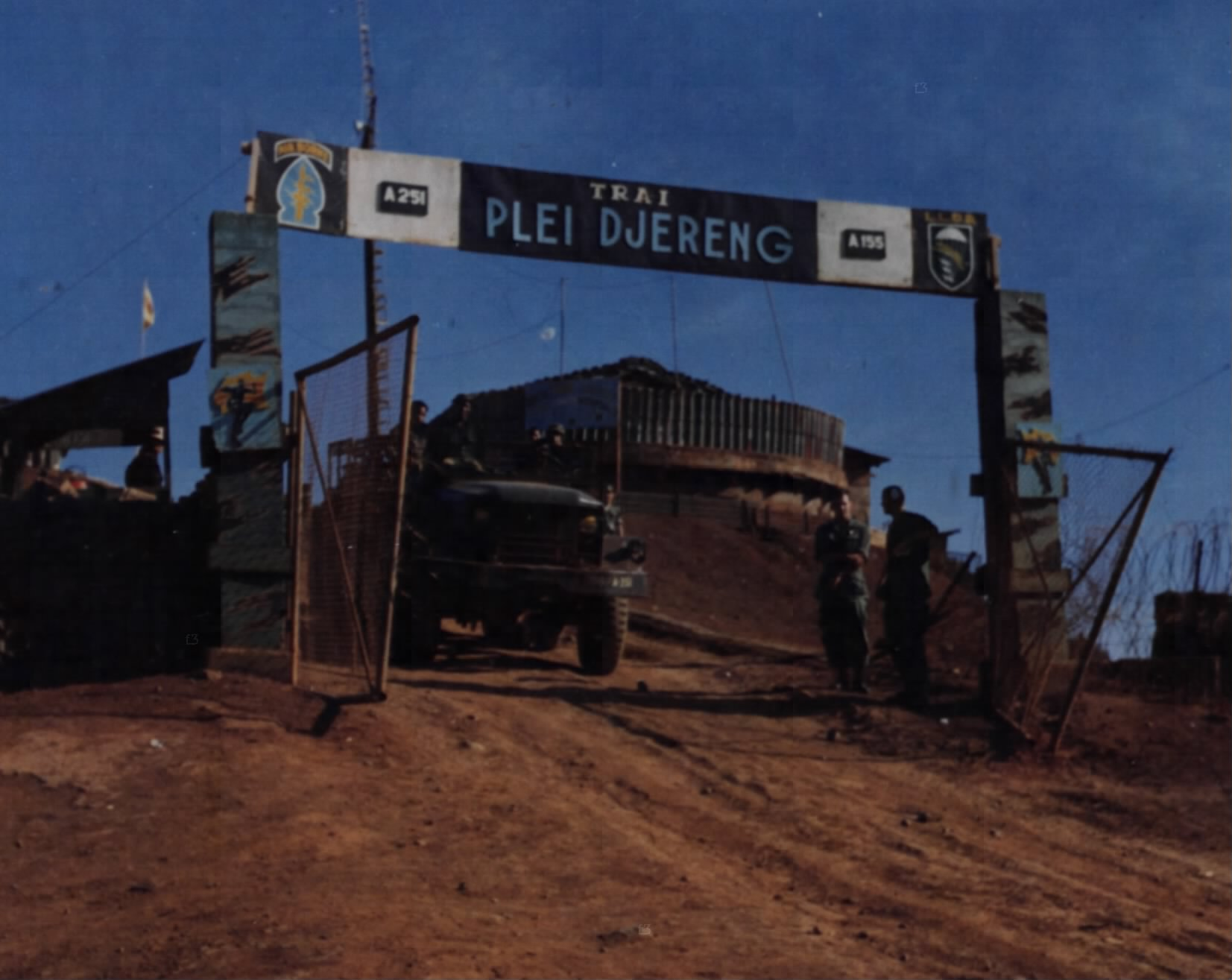
Front gate of the camp, 6 April 1970

A base was first established in December 1964 by the 5th Special Forces Group Detachment A-214 to monitor communist infiltration along the Ho Chi Minh Trail. The camp was located 41 km northwest of Pleiku and near to the Cambodian border.

Special Forces Detachment A-214 (later redesignated A-251) took over the camp in August 1965.

On 14 October 1966 the People's Army of Vietnam (PAVN) attacked reconnaissance patrols out of Plei Djereng. On 21 October U.S. forces launched Operation Paul Revere IV deploying the 3rd Brigade, 25th Infantry Division north of the camp and the 2nd Brigade, 4th Infantry Division south of the camp. In the first 12 days of the operation losses were 22 U.S. and 138 PAVN killed.

In late October 1966 the camp was moved 8 km south and the 20th Engineer Battalion built a new airfield here.

The 1st Brigade, 4th Infantry Division comprising:

- 3rd Battalion, 8th Infantry
- 1st Battalion, 22nd Infantry

was based at Plei Djereng in May 1970 to support the Cambodian Campaign.

Other units based at Plei Djereng included:

- 1st Battalion, 69th Armor

The camp was transferred to the ARVN 80th Border Rangers in October 1970.

On 2 September 1972 a PAVN force attacked the camp but were repulsed for the loss of approximately 100 killed. On the morning of 4 September in the face of heavy shelling and ground attacks the Rangers abandoned the camp.

On 21 September 1973 the camp came under PAVN artillery fire and on the 22nd it was overrun by the 26th Regiment, 320th Division supported by artillery and tanks. 200 of the 293 Rangers at the camp were killed or captured during the battle. PAVN casualties are not known but the Republic of Vietnam Air Force claim to have destroyed three T-54 tanks during the battle.

== Current use ==
The base is abandoned and turned over to farmland.
