= Đức Cơ Camp =

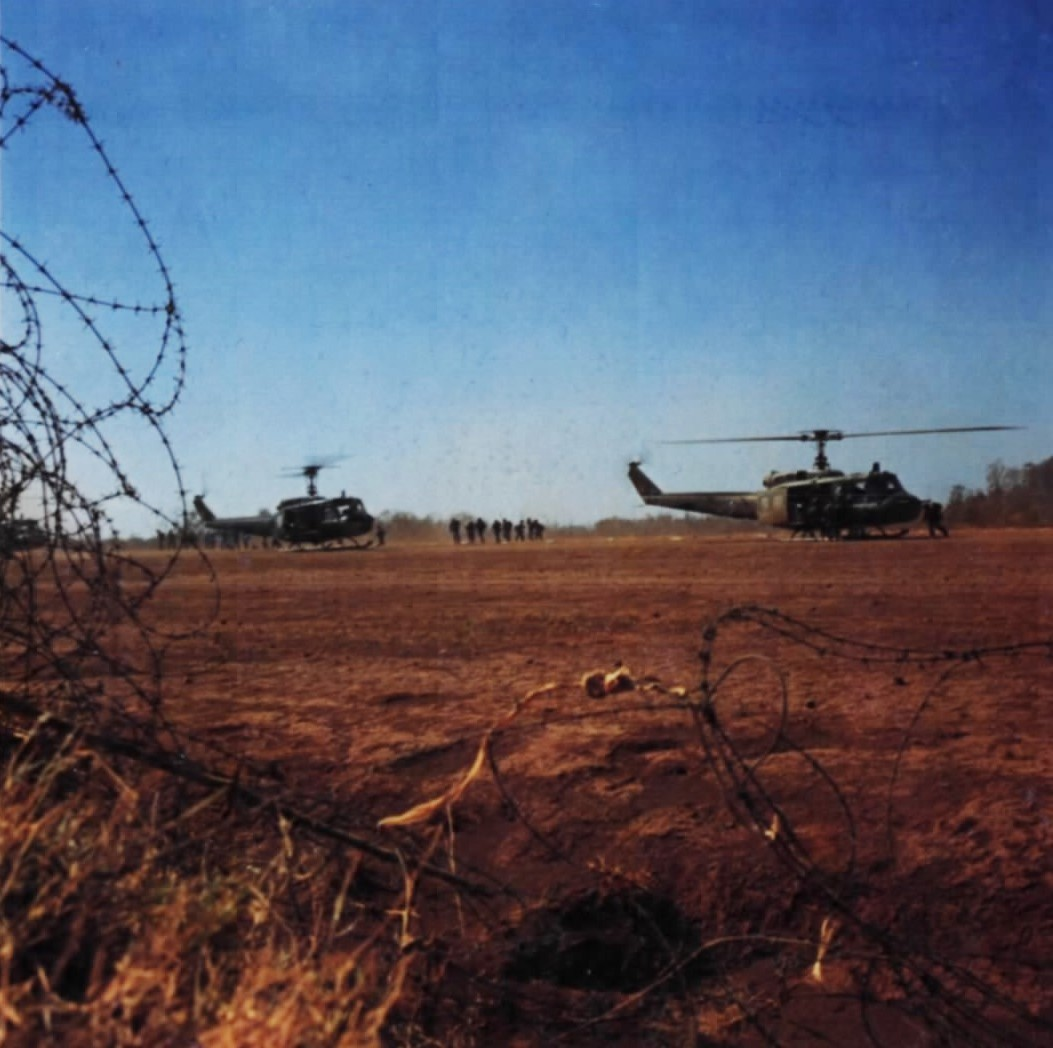
- During Operation Matador in the Central Highland, UH-1D Iroquois helicopters of Company A, 229th Helicopter Assault Battalion (Airmobile), depart Duc Co Special Forces Camp with strike force patrol. NARA 111-CCV-378-CC33045.

Site information
- Type: Army Base

Location
- Coordinates: 13.788°N 107.627°E

Site history
- Built: 1964
- In use: 1964-73
- Battles/wars: Vietnam War

Garrison information
- Occupants: 5th Special Forces Group

Đức Cơ Airfield
- IATA: none; ICAO: none

Summary
- Elevation AMSL: 1,247 ft (380 m)
- Interactive map of Đức Cơ Airfield

Runways
Direction	Length		Surface
Direction	ft	m	Surface
	3,700	1,128	PSP

Đức Cơ Camp (also known as Đức Cơ Special Forces Camp or Chu Dron Special Force camp) is a former U.S. Army and Army of the Republic of Vietnam (ARVN) base west of Pleiku in Gia Lai Province, central Vietnam.

The base was located on QL-19 13 km from the Cambodian border and approximately 55 km west of Pleiku.

== History ==
The Operational Detachment Alpha-224, 5th Special Forces Group first established a base at Đức Cơ in December 1964 to monitor communist infiltration along the Ho Chi Minh Trail.

In late May 1965 the People's Army of Vietnam (PAVN) besieged the camp which was defended by the 5th Special Forces Detachment A-215 and Civilian Irregular Defense Group program (CIDG) forces. On 3 August a force of Army of the Republic of Vietnam (ARVN) Paratroopers with Major Norman Schwarzkopf as senior military adviser was sent to relieve the camp. The paratroopers took heavy casualties and a second, larger force comprising the Republic of Vietnam Marine Division's Task Force Alpha and an ARVN armored task force departed Pleiku on 8 August to relieve the garrison. On 9 August they came into heavy contact with a PAVN battalion dug in astride Route 19. The South Vietnamese attacked and dislodged the PAVN, only to have the rear of the column attacked by another reinforced PAVN battalion. Battered by air strikes all night long, the PAVN 32nd Regiment, launched a final attack at dawn and then withdrew from the battlefield. On 10 August the South Vietnamese moved into Duc Co and broke the siege. The South Vietnamese infantry, with the support of U.S. and RVNAF air strikes, claimed to have killed over 400 PAVN and captured 71 weapons. VNMC losses were 28 killed and three missing. On 17 August additional ARVN forces supported by two battalions of the 173rd Airborne Brigade arrived.

=== 1966 ===
In May 1966 Operation Paul Revere was launched in the Đức Cơ tactical area. On 24 June the 1st Battalion, 35th Infantry and 3rd Squadron, 4th Cavalry Regiment engaged a PAVN Battalion close to the Cambodian border losing 15 U.S. killed. On 3 July a 35th Infantry platoon was ambushed and overrun with the loss of 17 U.S. and 23 PAVN killed.

=== 1967 ===
The 1st Battalion, 14th Infantry was based at Đức Cơ in June 1967.

The 3rd Battalion, 12th Infantry was based at Đức Cơ from September 1967 to February 1968.

The 1st Battalion, 69th Armor Regiment was based at Đức Cơ at various times in 1968/9.

The base was transferred to 81st Border Rangers.

=== 1972 ===
On 2 November following a PAVN artillery barrage, a PAVN tank-infantry assault overran the camp forcing its Ranger defenders to retreat to positions 500 yards (460 m) to the east where they were joined by ARVN reinforcements. Three tanks were reported destroyed by airstrikes.

=== 1973 ===
On 20 January during the War of the flags period before the Paris Peace Accords came into effect on 28 January 1973, the PAVN 320th Division attacked the camp and by the next day seized the camp. The International Commission of Control and Supervision (ICCS) established to monitor the Paris Peace Accords set up a base at Đức Cơ to monitor PAVN movements into Pleiku Province, however the ICCS team was never permitted outside its compound without PAVN escort and was not allowed to observe any traffic or military activity. Because of inadequate health protection and sanitation facilities provided by the PAVN, all the ICCS members became ill with malaria, dysentery, or other ailments and the ICCS base closed in May 1973.

== Current use ==
The base has been turned over to farmland and housing.
