= Krong Poko River =

River in Vietnam

The Krong Poko River (also called the Ya Krong Poko, Ia Krong Poko, Ya Crong Poko, or the Krong Po Ko) is a major tributary of the Tonlé San river in the Central Highlands, Vietnam.

== Geography ==
The Krong Poko flows south from the Central Highlands before merging with the Đăk Bla River to form the Tonlé San, also known as the Sesan River, at the town of Trung Nghai. These waters flow into Cambodia, the Mekong and then the Mekong Delta. Lower reaches of the river are characterized by wider lake-like conditions, sand banks, rocky channels, and wetlands, while the upper reaches become narrow, mountainous, and may include rapids.

== Plei Krong Dam ==
The Plei Krong Dam has been built at the confluence of the Krong Poko and Dak Bla rivers. During dam construction in 2004, the Vietnam News Agency reported that 581 families were to be displaced from the left bank of the Krong Poko in January 2005 to make way for the dam.

== Literature ==
The Vietnamese author Bảo Ninh sets the opening of his novel The Sorrow of War at the Krong Poko River.
