= Firebase 6 =

Site information
- Type: Army
- Condition: abandoned

Location
- Coordinates: 14.629°N 107.72°E

Site history
- Built: 1967
- In use: 1967–73
- Battles/wars: Vietnam War

Firebase 6 (also known as Hill 1001) is a former U.S. Army and Army of the Republic of Vietnam (ARVN) base southwest of Đắk Tô in the Central Highlands of Vietnam.

== History ==
The base was originally established in November 1967 during the Battle of Dak To by the 6th Battalion, 29th Artillery. The base is located approximately 8 km southwest of Đắk Tô, east of the Plei Trap Valley along a mountain ridge that runs approximately north-south towards Kontum, during the war this was nicknamed Rocket Ridge.

The 1st Battalion. 92nd Artillery was also located here.

The base was handed over the ARVN 42nd Regiment, 22nd Division in late 1970.

The PAVN 66th Regiment attacked the base on 31 March 1971 overrunning the base. Lieutenant Brian Thacker team leader of an Integrated Observation System would be awarded the Medal of Honor for his actions during the battle. ARVN reinforcements were flown in and recaptured the base although PAVN units remained in force in the surrounding area. More than 280 PAVN were killed, mostly by airstrikes. The PAVN attacked the base again on 3 April with the ARVN reporting a further 900 PAVN killed and a total of 68 ARVN killed, though sources in Saigon expressed skepticism over these figures. By 11 April approximately 1,000 ARVN were defending the base, opposed by an estimated 7,000 PAVN. The PAVN were pounded with B-52 strikes and BLU-82 Fuel Air Explosive bombs. On 14 April a ground relief force reached the base encountering minimal opposition to lift the siege. On 15 April in a skirmish 1.5 miles (2.4 km) southeast of the base the ARVN killed 38 PAVN for the loss of four killed.

At the start of the Easter Offensive in 1972 the base was defended by a company of the ARVN 72nd Rangers and a platoon from the 42nd Regiment. On 25 April 1972 during the Battle of Kontum after the PAVN had overrun the ARVN bases at Tân Cảnh and Đắk Tô, Firebases 5 and 6 along Rocket Ridge were abandoned.

== Current use ==
The base is abandoned and has reverted to jungle.
