= Battle of An Lão =

Battle during the Vietnam War (1964)

- Part of the Vietnam War
| Date | 7-9 December 1964 |
| Location | An Lão, South Vietnam |
| Result | Viet Cong victory |

Belligerents
| South Vietnam | Viet Cong |

Commanders and leaders
| Nguyễn Hữu Có; Nguyễn Xuân Thịnh | Giáp Văn Cương; Đỗ Phú Đáp; Nguyễn Thành Tâm |

Units involved
| 22nd Infantry Division: 41st Infantry Regiment; Special Forces B Detachment: one platoon; Bình Định Sub-sector: two companies and two platoons of Regional Forces; 12 platoons of Popular Forces | 2nd Infantry Regiment: 95th Battalion; 97th Battalion; 409th Sapper Battalion Bình Định Province Command: one company of Province Local Force; 8 platoons of District Local Force |

Casualties and losses
| (South Vietnam) 34 killed; 362 missing (United States) 3 killed | 150 casualties-316 killed |

The Battle of An Lão took place during the Vietnam War in the An Lão District of Bình Định Province between 7 and 9 December 1964. The battle was part of a larger operation by the communist 5th Military Region known as Campaign An Lão to capture An Lão valley, and use it as a corridor between their military bases in Quảng Ngãi Province and Bình Định Province.

The battle was initiated by offensive actions conducted jointly by People's Army of Vietnam (PAVN) forces and Viet Cong (VC) guerrillas when they captured the An Lão district headquarters in the coastal Bình Định province within the II Corps tactical zone. For three days, this joint military force successfully repelled large numbers of counterattacking Army of the Republic of Vietnam (ARVN) troops.

== Background ==
In 1964, with successive defeats in all battlefields, the government of the South Vietnam tried to strengthen its forces by occupying key mountainous areas in order to control the VC bases. Implementing that policy, the South Vietnam built the An Lão district headquarter base.

As a mountainous district located in the north of Bình Định, the inhabitants are mainly H're people, during the First Indochina War, An Lão was an important base of Viet Minh's the 5th Military Region. Although most of district area are mountains, the district capital lies in a valley, where important traffic hubs are located. Road 56 connects with Highway 1A in Bồng Sơn to the south. In the north of the district capital, Road 56 is divided into two branches, one parallel to the An Lão River running straight to Ba Tơ District, another branch crossing the river running along the valley is the arterial road of the An Lão district headquarters.

== Prelude ==
The ARVN increased the number of troops stationed in the area up to 884, including two companies and two platoons of Regional Forces, 12 platoons of Popular Forces, one mortar platoon and one Special Forces platoon. In addition to the force in the district capital headquarters base, the ARVN also arranged three strongholds: Mount Một (also known as Hill 193) located north of An Lão bridge, guarding the road between the district capital and the northwest area; Mount Mít (in Long Thạnh); and Bà Nhỏ stream (in Hội Long). Civilians in the valley were gathered into eight strategic hamlets, each hamlet was guarded by a Popular Forces platoon.

In this continuous defense system, Mount Một was the main base. Here, the ARVN deployed a Regional Forces company, a mortar platoon, a Special Forces platoon and a Popular Forces platoon.

In early December 1964, the 5th Military Region decided to attack the An Lão district capital to expand their controlled area. Along with the Province Command's local forces which included a company of province, eight platoons of district and guerrilla forces of the communes, the Military Region 5 also reinforced the 2nd Infantry Regiment and the 409th Sapper Battalion of Main Forces.

== Battle ==
On 7 December 1964, the VC captured the district headquarters following an early morning surprise attack with squads scaling the fence and lobbing grenades to disable the ARVN machine gun positions ringing the base. A second wave of attackers infiltrated the base and ultimately took control. That night MACV headquarters reported the VC had overrun the command post on Hill 193, were threatening An Lão's subsector headquarters, and remained in the area to fight. Two ARVN companies were missing.

The An Lão's subsector headquarters resided within a triangular French fort manned by 100 Regional Forces soldiers. When US military advisor Captain Peter R. Coggins approached the besieged post, VC fire forced his helicopter down. After repairing the damage, he resumed his flight and landed inside the fort. There he found the garrison in a state of panic. He rallied the men and organized a coherent defense before taking off once more under heavy fire to evacuate 11 wounded South Vietnamese soldiers. The garrison continued to fight, repulsing the attackers.

As the battle was unfolding at the district headquarters, PAVN/VC fanned out to overrun most of the valley's hamlets. More than 330 territorial soldiers disappeared with their weapons. On 8 December the PAVN/VC ambushed a relief column as it moved up the narrow, 22km-long valley. Several 57mm recoilless rifles destroyed three M113 armored personnel carriers. When a US Army helicopter arrived to remove the wounded, PAVN/VC gunners hit it eleven times. The aircraft survived, but the fire killed an American aboard an escort helicopter.

== Aftermath ==
The final count for the three-day battle was 37 allied dead, 73 wounded, 362 missing, eight crew-served weapons and 424 individual weapons lost, three M113s destroyed and several more damaged. The allies estimated PAVN/VC casualties at 316 dead, with 211 of the casualties attributed to airstrikes.

The South Vietnamese then undertook a month-long operation to reestablish control over the valley using three, and later two, battalions. The effort resulted in another five ARVN dead and 48 wounded. PAVN/VC losses from this effort numbered 40 dead and five captured. For now, the government claimed titular possession of the valley’s 18,000 residents, but below the surface the VC maintained a strong presence.

== Legacy ==
Battle of An Lão map appears in Rising Storm 2: Vietnam - a video game released worldwide in 2017 by cooperation of Antimatter Games, Tripwire Interactive and Iceberg Interactive.
