= Nguyễn Chơn =

Colonel general in the People's Army of Vietnam (1927–2015)

Colonel General Nguyễn Chơn

Deputy Chief of General Staff
- In office 1987–1993
- President: Võ Chí Công, Lê Đức Anh
- Minister: Lê Đức Anh, Đoàn Khuê

Deputy Minister of Ministry of Defence
- In office 1993–1998
- President: Lê Đức Anh, Trần Đức Lương
- Minister: Đoàn Khuê, Phạm Văn Trà

Personal details
- Born: Nguyễn Chơn; December 1927 Hòa Vang, Quảng Nam, Annam (French protectorate)
- Died: December 2015 (aged 87–88) Socialist Republic of Vietnam
- Party: Communist Party of Vietnam

Military service
- Allegiance: Democratic Republic of Vietnam and later Socialist Republic of Vietnam
- Branch/service: People's Army of Vietnam
- Years of service: 50
- Rank: Colonel General
- Unit: 1st Regiment (Ba Gia); 2nd Infantry Division
- Commands: Military Region 5
- Battles/wars: First Indochina War; Vietnam War; Battle of Trà Bình; Battle of Khâm Đức; Battle of Kontum; Battle of Đức Dục; Battle of Thượng Đức; Huế – Đà Nẵng Campaign; Cambodian–Vietnamese War
- Awards: Hero of the People's Armed Forces (1970)

Nguyễn Chơn (1927 – 2015) was a colonel-general in the People's Army of Vietnam (PAVN) active during the First Indochina War, the Vietnam War, and the Cambodian–Vietnamese War. He led the 1st Regiment of the PAVN 2nd Infantry Division in the Battle of Trà Bình 1967, then the whole 2nd Infantry Division in the Battle of Đức Dục and the Battle of Thượng Đức 1974.

== Military career ==
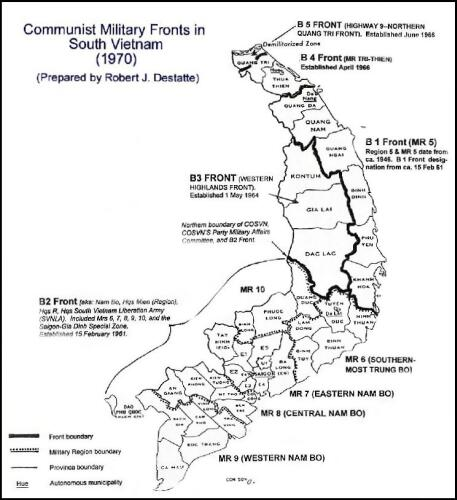
NLF Fronts and Military regions, 1970

In February 1967, under the commander Hà Văn Trí and his deputy Nguyễn Chơn, the 1st Regiment of the PAVN 2nd Infantry Division launched a fierce attack on a South Korean base garrisoned by a Republic of Korea Marine Corps (ROKMC) company and two United States Marine Corps (USMC) soldiers on the Quang Thạnh hill. The PAVN had captured half of the base but were repelled at last when another ROKMC company arrived as reinforcements by helicopters.

In late April 1972, division commander Nguyễn Chơn directly led his 1st Regiment took part in the 2nd Battle of Dak To. On 24 April, one hour after the PAVN 66th Regiment defeated the ARVN 42nd Regiment in Tân Cảnh Base Camp, the 1st Regiment also overran the ARVN 47th Regiment in the nearby Đắk Tô Base Camp.

From mid July to mid November 1974, Nguyễn Chơn led his 2nd Division concurrently fighting against the Army of the Republic of Vietnam (ARVN) 3rd Infantry Division and I Corps's Rangers in the Battle of Đức Dục and the Battle of Thượng Đức, causing irreplaceable losses for the ARVN forces.

In late March 1984, the Military Region 5 forces including the 307th Division, the 1st Regiment of the 2nd Division, the 143rd Regiment of the 315th Division under the command of Maj. Gen. Nguyễn Chơn (newly assigned commander of the Region) launched a major offensive against Khmer Rouge Base 547 in Preah Vihear province. After eight days of fighting, the PAVN forces totally destroyed Base 547, eliminating 1,800 enemy troops, capturing 300 prisoners and 515 weapons. But the 1st Regiment suffered heavy casualties in the 7th day, and the 2nd Division even lost its commander - Col. Trương Hồng Anh in the last day of the campaign, when the PAVN forces already overran the Base.
