= Battle of Kontum =

Part of the Vietnam War (1972)

- Part of the Easter Offensive in the Vietnam War
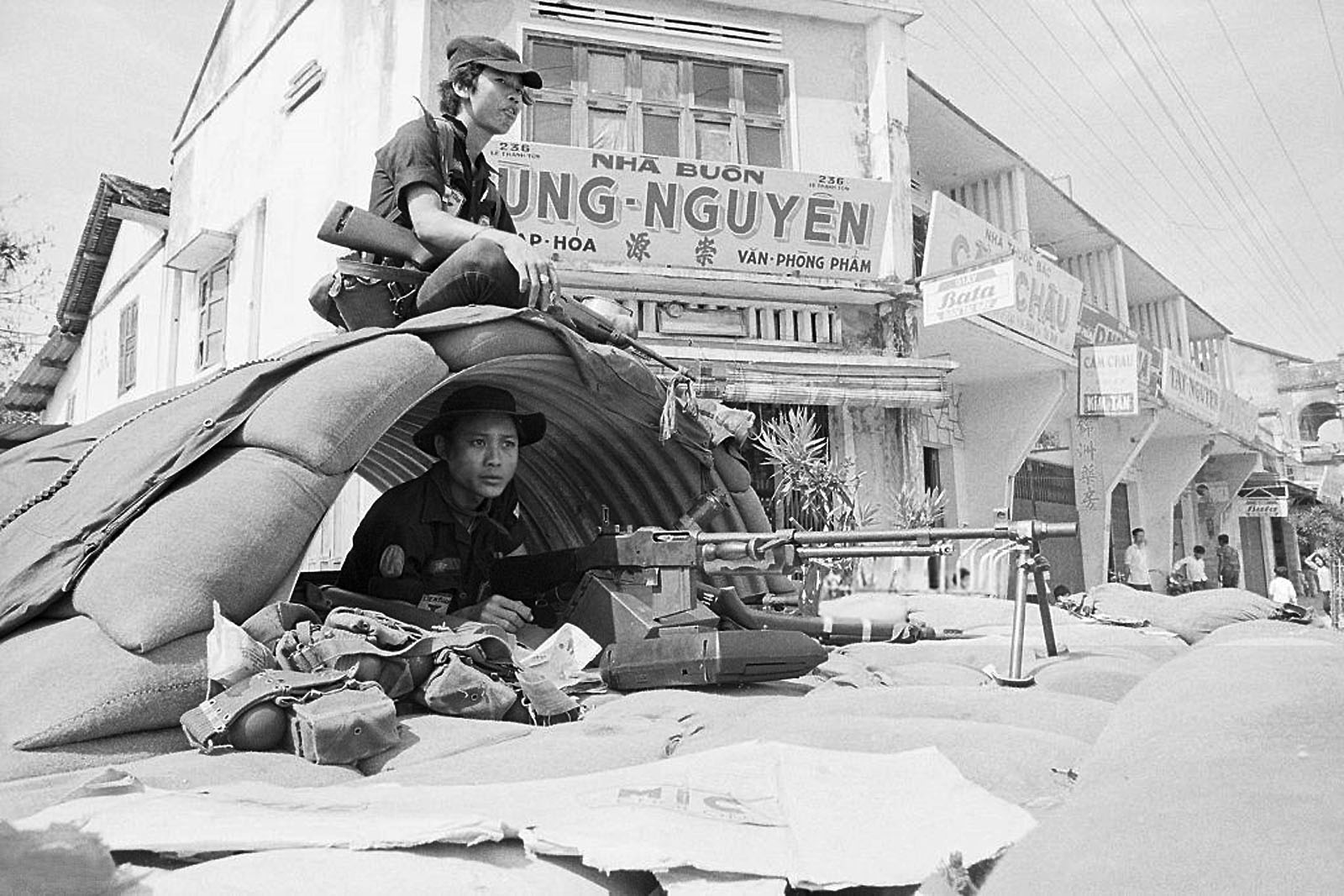
- South Vietnamese soldiers man a bunker in Kontum city, 26 April 1972
Date	2 May – 1 July 1972
Location	Kontum, South Vietnam 14°21′22″N 108°0′28″E
Result	South Vietnamese and U.S. victory

Belligerents
South Vietnam; United States	North Vietnam

Commanders and leaders
(South Vietnam) Ngô Du (replaced by Nguyễn Văn Toàn); Lê Đức Đạt † (replaced by Lý Tòng Bá) (United States) John Paul Vann †; John G. Hill Jr.	Hoàng Minh Thảo; Trương Chí Cương; Nguyễn Chơn; Kim Tuấn

Units involved
(South Vietnam) II Corps: 22nd Division; 42nd & 47th Infantry Regiments; 14th Armored Squadron; 23rd Division; 44th, 45th, 53rd Infantry Regiments; 8th Armored Squadron; (South Vietnam) ARVN Armored: 19th & 3rd Squadrons; (South Vietnam) ARVN Rangers: 2nd & 6th Groups; (South Vietnam) ARVN Airborne: 2nd, 9th & 11th Bn.s; Supported by: (South Vietnam) RVN Air Force (United States) 17th Air Cavalry (United States) U.S. Air Force	(Vietnam) Military Region 5: 2nd Division; 1st & 141st Infantry Regiments; D10 Sapper Battalion; 320th Division; 48th, 52nd, 64th Infantry Regiments; 54th Artillery Regiment; B3 units; 24B, 28th, 66th, 95B Inf. Regt.s; 631st Inf. Bn.; 37th Sapper Bn.; 406th Sapper Bn.; 297th Tank Bn.; 29th B-72 Company; Supported by: 40th Artillery Regiment; 675th Artillery Regiment

Casualties and losses
In this battle: 1000+ 15 M-41 destroyed 23 105mm, 7 155mm howitzers captured During the Central Highlands campaign: (PAVN estimate) 41,000 killed, wounded or captured	In this battle: (U.S. estimate) ~4,000 casualties 8 T-54 destroyed 5 PT-76 destroyed During the Central Highlands campaign: (U.S. estimate) 20,000–40,000; 24 T-54/Type 59 destroyed

The lead-up to the Battle of Kontum began in mid-1971, when North Vietnam decided that their performance in Operation Lam Son 719 indicated that the time had come for large-scale conventional offensives that could end the war quickly. The resulting offensive, planned for the spring of 1972, would be known as the Easter Offensive in Western media, the 1972 Spring–Summer Offensive (Chiến dịch Xuân–Hè 1972) in North Vietnam, or the Fiery Red Summer (Mùa hè đỏ lửa) in South Vietnam. The Easter Offensive would make use of fourteen divisions and would be the largest in the war.

The 1972 Easter Offensive began with a massive attack on the Demilitarized Zone with 30,000 People's Army of Vietnam (PAVN) soldiers and more than 100 tanks. Two thrusts of equivalent size, one towards Saigon and another to the Central Highlands and provincial capital of Kontum began soon after, code-named as Nguyễn Huệ campaign and Bắc Tây Nguyên campaign respectively. The North Vietnamese knew that if they could capture Kontum and the Central Highlands, they would cut South Vietnam in half.

The Battle for Kontum would pit the Army of the Republic of Vietnam (ARVN) 22nd Division, two Armored Squadrons (14th and 19th), the 2nd Airborne Brigade and the 2nd Ranger Group under Lt. Gen. Ngô Du in Phase I at Đắk Tô/Tân Cảnh; and later the 23rd Division, two Armored Squadrons (8th and 3rd), and two Ranger Groups (2nd and 6th) under Maj. Gen. Nguyễn Văn Toàn in Phase II at Kontum city, against the PAVN corps-size force of two regular divisions (320th and 2nd), two Artillery Regiments (40th and 675th), the 297th Tank Battalion, the 29th B-72 Missle Company plus B3 Front's four independent regiments (24B, 28th, 66th, 95B), and local Viet Cong forces under commander Maj. Gen. Hoàng Minh Thảo and commissar Trương Chí Cương.

There were two factors that persuaded North Vietnam that all out assaults of this kind could be successful. First, due to President Nixon's Vietnamization policy, there were no American divisional forces in the Central Highlands, only advisers and U.S. aviation units including Air Cavalry helicopter units from the 7/17 Air Cavalry Squadron. By June of that year there were less than 50,000 U.S. forces in all of Vietnam.

Second, the North Vietnamese had persuaded the Soviets and Chinese to provide 400 PT-76, T-34-85, T-54, and Type 59 tanks before the spring offensive.

== Background ==
North Vietnam had been using the Ho Chi Minh Trail along the border as a logistical artery for years. The mountainous terrain and the jungle were a shield against American air attack.

The ARVN bases at Tân Cảnh and Đắk Tô, were protected by the 42nd Regiment of the 22nd Division. The 22nd Division also controlled five fire support bases (FSBs) that stretched south-west from Tân Cảnh towards Kontum along a backbone of mountains nicknamed Rocket Ridge.

John Paul Vann, the civilian "general" of II Corps, had received intelligence that a major battle was coming. Du responded by moving the 22nd Division Forward CP, its 47th regiment, and a substantial logistic element of the division from their rear base in Bình Định province to the Đắk Tô/Tân Cảnh area. Elements of the 19th Armored Squadron were attached to the Division to support its organic 14th Armored Squadron equipped with M41 light tanks. The armored units would be deployed forward at Ben Het Camp which was regarded as the most likely direction of a PAVN armored attack. The movement was accomplished on 8 February. Vann also ordered increased B-52 air attacks that February and March.

=== Attacks on the Fire Support Bases ===
On March 30, commander Kim Tuấn of the PAVN 320th Division, ordered his 52nd Regiment (Tây Tiến) to begin encircling and pressuring the ARVN 2nd Airborne Battalion and several nearby isolated outposts held by the 3/47th Infantry Battalion on Firebase Delta (Hill 1049). Facing intense pressure from three sides, the defenders were forced to contract their perimeter. On 3 April, the 52nd Regiment shifted to an offensive posture, inflicting heavy losses on the 2nd Airborne.

On 4 April 1972, the PAVN launched an early morning attack against Firebase Delta. Instead of the usual artillery fire from the jungle, elements of the PAVN 320th Infantry Division made a massed attack supported by artillery and rockets. For several days the PAVN hit FSB Delta and the other fire support bases along Rocket Ridge. Helicopters from the 52nd Combat Aviation operating out of Camp Holloway in Pleiku, were dispatched to provide support. The firebases were totally dependent on helicopter support for supplies and ammunition and in spite of the heavy anti-aircraft fire, the helicopters went on the offensive to provide fire support to the FSBs. At one point, the northern part of Delta was overrun by elements of the 320th Division. Vann, already in the area for an air rescue, was able to direct attacks on the PAVN soldiers entering the base with Cobra gunships. The PAVN attack was stopped in its tracks.

In the first week of April, Gen. Du's order of battle showed the 22nd Division with a total of 13 battalions consisting of three border ranger battalions, eight ARVN infantry battalions and scout companies, cavalry, sector forces, and 50 tubes of artillery; the Airborne Division with six airborne battalions, one border ranger battalion, and 16 tubes of artillery; Kontum sector with a ranger group of two battalions and territorial forces; and 50 tanks belonging to the 14th and 19th Armored Squadrons spread between Pleiku and Ben Het.

This realignment strained the logistical support of ARVN forces north of Vo Dinh due to the limited capability of the single road into the area. As this posture the ARVN forces were extremely vulnerable to an envelopment which would isolate al forces north of Vo Dinh. The pressure continued to increase, however, as the enemy buildup continued. His problems were compounded by the ineffective leadership of Col. Lê Đức Đạt, the 22nd Division Commander, whose inept handling of a combat assault by the 9th Airborne Battalion resulted in the loss of two helicopters, a failure to exploit two B-52 strikes, and divisiveness between the 22nd Division ann the Airborne Division.

On 14 April, following a rocket and artillery barrage, the 320th Division attacked Firebase Charlie (14.576°N 107.778°E, Hill 1015) on the northern end of Rocket Ridge and 10 km from Đắk Tô. Despite airstrikes and helicopter gunship support the ARVN Airborne defenders were forced to abandon the base that night. Major John J. Duffy, the advisor to the 11th Airborne Battalion, would be awarded the Medal of Honor for his actions in 2022. The attacks on the firebases continued as April wore on. Finally on 21 April, FSB Delta was taken by the PAVN. Several of the other bases had to be given up soon after with heavy casualties.

=== Loss of Tân Cảnh and Đắk Tô ===
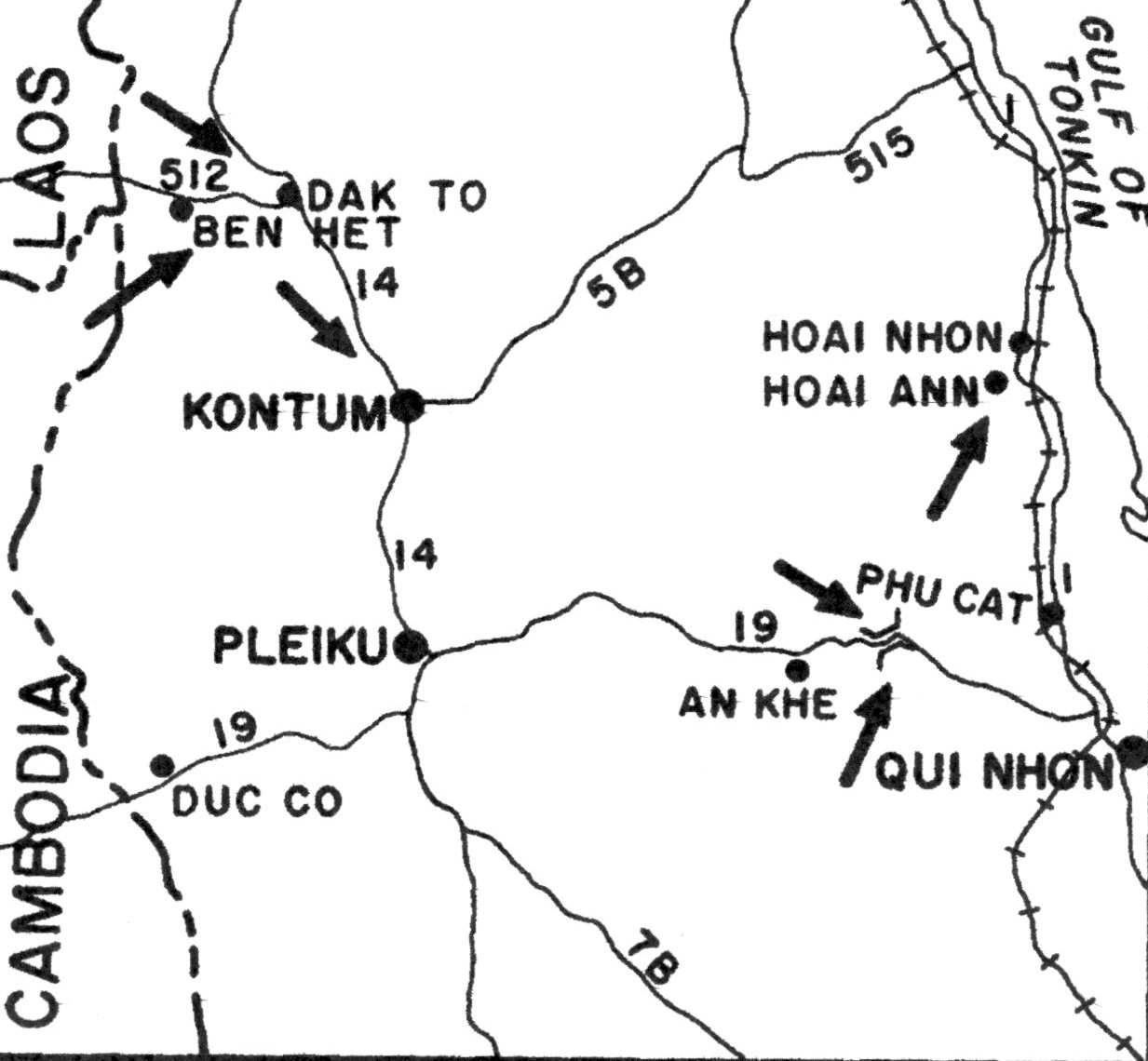
Map showing the PAVN attacks

Since the start of the Easter Offensive at the end of March, the base areas had come under increasing PAVN artillery and rocket fire, which had gone from 20 to 50 rounds per day in March to up to 1000 per day by mid-April. During early April, the 47th Regiment withdrew to Đắk Tô II, while the 42nd Regiment and one Battalion of the 41st Regiment were at Tân Cảnh supported by armor and artillery. In addition ARVN Airborne and Rangers occupied a string of firebases along Rocket Ridge. On 23 April, the PAVN 66th Regiment in the 2nd Division formation, supported by the 37th Sapper Battalion and one T-54 company, started their attack on Tân Cảnh by hitting the ARVN tanks with wire-guided missiles and this was followed by a direct hit on the 42nd Regiment command bunker injuring the senior US adviser and several of the ARVN commanders and severely undermining the confidence of Col. Đạt. By midday all five of the M-41 tanks in the base and several more bunkers had been destroyed by the missiles. At 11:00 Vann landed to assess the situation and instructed the US advisers to prepare to escape and evade from the camp. At 19:00 PAVN rocket fire ignited the base ammunition dump

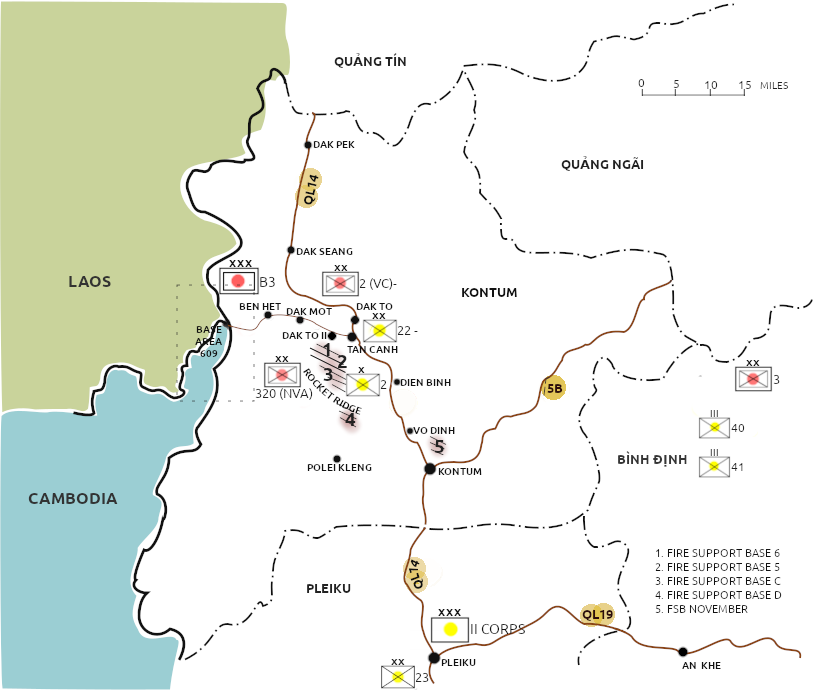
Kontum dispositions in Easter 1972 - early April

At 21:00 a column of 18 PAVN tanks was spotted in the area, an Air Force AC-130 gunship arrived at 23:00 and began to engage the T-54 tanks with its 105mm cannon. Three T-54s were disabled but later recovered by the PAVN. At midnight the tank column turned towards Tân Cảnh and the ARVN artillery began firing on the column until stopped by PAVN counterbattery fire. Two bridges on the approach to Tân Cảnh were abandoned without being destroyed. The ARVN organised hunter-killer teams and these destroyed two tanks.

Just before 06:00 on 24 April, the PAVN tanks attacked Tân Cảnh in two columns. One column of T-54s attacked the main gate, the other moving to secure the airstrip. The advance of the tanks caused the 900 support troops to panic. The new command bunker was hit by further artillery fire destroying the radio antennas. With the collapse of all command and control on the base, the American advisers abandoned the command bunker and moved to a new position to call in airstrikes, however fog made such airstrikes impossible. At dawn Vann arrived over Tân Cảnh in his OH-58A and made contact with the advisers who had escaped from the base perimeter. Vann landed and six advisers squeezed into the helicopter while frightened ARVN troops hung onto the skids. The helicopter flew to Đắk Tô II to drop off the passengers and then flew back to Tân Cảnh where they picked up the remaining three advisers, however the helicopter was swarmed by panicky ARVN and crashed on takeoff. Another helicopter came in and picked up Vann, his pilot and the three advisers and flew them to Pleiku.

One hour after the main PAVN attack on Tân Cảnh commenced, the PAVN began their attack on Đắk Tô II. A UH-1H helicopter #69-15715 landed to evacuate the six U.S. advisers who had been rescued from the Tân Cảnh perimeter, this helicopter was hit by PAVN anti-aircraft fire and crashed, five passengers and crew were killed in the crash while five survived, evaded capture and were recovered up 13 days later. The PAVN penetrated the base perimeter suffering heavy losses, the remaining U.S. advisers called in airstrikes as the morning fog cleared but by 10:00 the 47th Regiment commander had lost contact with most of his subordinates and the command group evacuated the command bunker for a bunker in the inner perimeter. A T-54 moved into the base and began direct fire on the command post, the two remaining M41s engaged the T-54, however their 76mm guns had no apparent effect on the T-54 which quickly knocked out both M41s. A relief column of M-41s supported by infantry arrived from Ben Het around this time, but all the M41s were knocked out by B-40 rockets and recoilless rifle fire and the infantry dispersed. With the failure of this counterattack and the loss of command and control the ARVN forces began to evacuate the base towards the south. As the ARVN attempted to cross the Dak Poko river they came under intense PAVN fire and the senior U.S. adviser Lieutenant colonel Robert Brownlee disappeared during this engagement. At 20:00 the 47th Regiment command group attempted to escape the base and by 04:30 on 25 April after losing several men to PAVN fire escaped the base perimeter and were recovered the following day. The attacking PAVN units at Đắk Tô II were the 1st Regiment (Ba Gia) of the 2nd Division formed the infantry assault along with the D10 Sapper Battalion, under the division commander Nguyễn Chơn. The supported T-54 tanks were from one battalion of the 203rd Tank Regiment.

On 25 April the PAVN mopped up the remaining ARVN positions around Tân Cảnh/Đắk Tô. The 22nd Division had ceased to exist as a fighting unit, Col. Đạt and his entire staff had disappeared and the PAVN had captured 23 105mm and seven 155mm howitzers and large supplies of ammunition and stores. With the loss of the main camps, the remaining firebases along Rocket Ridge were abandoned and the PAVN had a clear approach to Kontum. On 25 April, the Joint General Staff (JGS) took the 2nd Airborne Brigade out of Vo Dinh, once the 6th Ranger Group arrived to fill the gap a day before.

== Prelude ==
With the loss of Tan Canh, little stood between the PAVN and Kontum. Whether because of logistical issues or lack of leadership, the PAVN did not pursue their advantage. Instead of refilling their tanks and traveling 25 miles (40 km) to Kontum, the PAVN waited for almost three weeks. In preparing for the final push to take the Kontum city, the PAVN gradually moved forces southeast toward Vo Dinh base in the north and Chu Pao pass in the south of the city.

Meanwhile, the 3rd PAVN Division attacked the three northernmost districts of Bình Định province, forcing the remaining two regiments of the 22nd ARVN Division to flee from their two major bases Landing Zone English and Bong Son, and other strong points in the area. This event made the JGS began to trust Vann's contention that the PAVN's real goal was to take Kontum and Bình Định, not An Lộc nor Quảng Trị, to cut South Vietnam in two. On April 28, Du was ordered to Saigon to see President Thiệu, then finally replaced by Major general Toàn on May 10. II Corps began its new defensive plan against the PAVN advance, by assigning Colonel Lý Tòng Bá, commander of the 23rd Division, to command all forces in Kontum province, including his division's 53rd Regiment, 2nd and 6th Ranger Groups, and Kontum sector forces. On April 28, the 23rd Division HQ was also moved over 150 kilometers from Ban Me Thuot to Kontum city.

After two days of heavy attacks-by-fire, the 6th Ranger Group's command post and U.S. advisors were airlifted to FSB November on 27 April. Two days later, the 6th Group's remaining two battalions also fled from Lam Son base, forced their accompanying armor and artillery units consequently fled. On 1 May, Vo Dinh was completely abandoned.

On the ground in Kontum, Colonel John Truby, the acting Senior Advisor for the 23rd (awaiting the arrival of Colonel Rhotenberry), had the task of tactical coordination of defense. Outlying units were brought into the city. A perimeter defense of the city and proper defence was implemented. The ARVN soldiers, believing that the T-54 tanks were unstoppable, were trained on how to attack them using M72 LAW missiles.

In early May the PAVN turned their attention to the Polei Kleng Camp which blocked the avenue for attack on Kontum and to Ben Het Camp which threatened their supply lines. Polei Kleng had been subjected to artillery fire since 24 April, but from midday on 6 May the volume of fire increased dramatically with over 500 rounds systematically destroying the base bunkers and at 19:00 the two U.S. advisers at the base were evacuated by helicopter. The ARVN continued to hold for a further three days during which time U.S. airpower, including 16 B-52 strikes, was concentrated on the attacking PAVN. On the morning of 9 May the ARVN abandoned the base in the face of a PAVN tank and infantry assault. At Ben Het on 9 May elements of the PAVN 203rd Armored Regiment assaulted the camp. ARVN Rangers destroyed the first three PT-76 tanks with BGM-71 TOW missiles, thereby breaking up the attack. The Rangers spent the rest of the day stabilising the perimeter ultimately destroying 11 tanks and killing over 100 PAVN.

== Battle ==
=== Main action ===
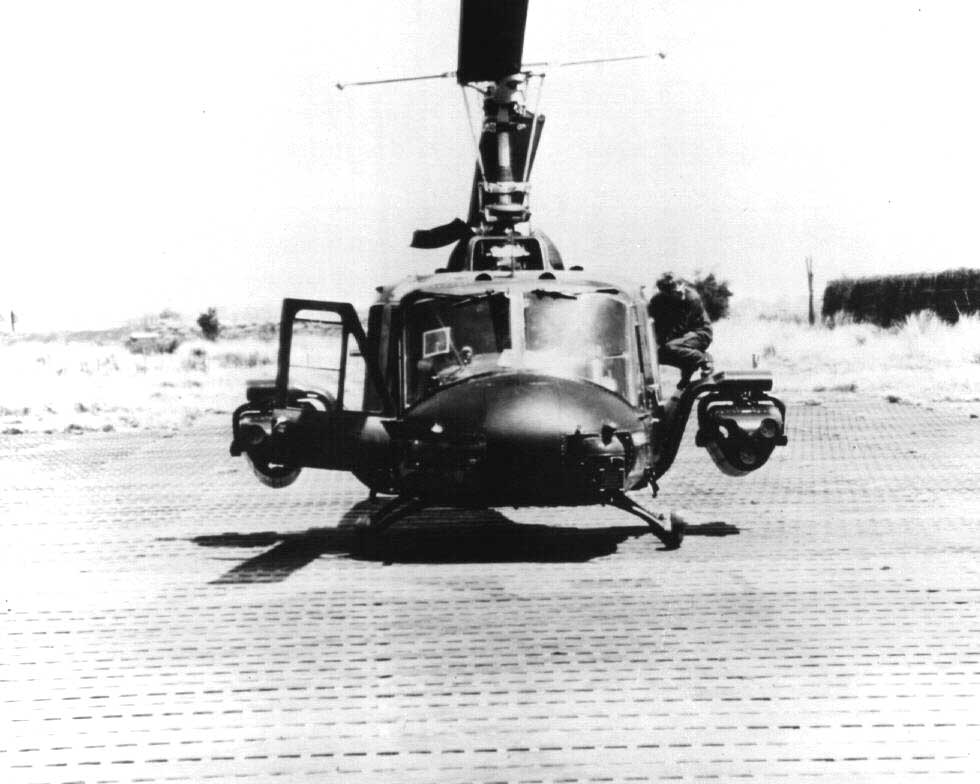
UH-1 armed with TOW missiles, 2 May 1972

On 13 May, the final reinforcements would arrive in Kontum, numbering 490 ARVN troops of the 44th Regiment as well as a small unit of three 82nd Airborne Jeeps equipped with TOW missiles. Due to the small numbers, it was primarily used to test the new TOW missiles, rather than to turn the tide of the battle. Two of the three TOW Jeeps would be deployed to cover Highway 14 later that evening, along with the 44th Regiment.

Later in the day, Combat Aerial TOW Team (Hawk's Claw) pilots noticed signs of a large buildup to the north. At 22:30 that night, there were reports of lights moving down Route 14.

As captured documents stated that the attack would take place at 04:00 on 14 May, Truby suggested to Vann that they order an air strike in preparation. However, the heavy PAVN artillery buildup that had signalled an attack at Tan Canh and the FSBs was absent. Even so, air support was requested. Another captured document indicated the attack had been moved back to 04:30, again, no attack occurred. Finally, the defenders realized that PAVN intelligence would be operating on Hanoi time. At 05:30 as predicted, the attack began.

The PAVN attacked Kontum without the heavy artillery preparation that had been used at Tan Canh and drove straight down Route 14. The 48th PAVN Regiment and 203rd Tank Regiment attacked the city from the northwest. The 28th PAVN Regiment came from the north and the 64th and 141st PAVN Regiments attacked from the south. The ARVN artillery began targeting the T-54 tanks moving down Route 14. This targeting separated the supporting PAVN infantry from their tanks and allowed the ARVN tank killers to do their work. Two T-54s were destroyed by teams with LAWs. The sky was overcast and tactical air (TACAIR) support was not able to operate, however, Hawk's Claw helicopters had arrived on the scene from Camp Holloway. Their helicopters and Jeeps had TOW missiles, which were powerful enough to penetrate a T-54. They found the PAVN tanks before they could find cover in the jungle and destroyed two more tanks. By 09:00 hours, the attack had been stopped.

The PAVN continued their rocket and artillery fire throughout the day. Then at 20:00 on the 14th, the PAVN launched a second attack, putting heavy pressure on the north, west and south. There were two B-52 strikes scheduled and Truby asked Vann if those strikes could be used to target the PAVN battalion that was already very close to their lines. The two forces were now close enough for hand-to-hand combat. Truby called Lt. Col. Tom McKenna, senior advisor to the 44th ARVN Regiment, and told him to pull his men back and to have his troops find deep foxholes. As the hour for the B-52 strike approached, ARVN troops laid down cover fire to allow those in close proximity to the PAVN forces to be pulled back. At the same time the 44th Regiment was holding its own against the PAVN along its perimeter with the aid of AC-130s and helicopters. The two B-52 air strikes were close enough that as McKenna stated, "it was like they [the bombs] came from the center of the earth – just like the bowels of the earth exploding." The PAVN forces pulled back having suffered significant casualties. On 15 May the PAVN attack continued, but the 44th held its positions assisted by TACAIR support.

On the night of 16 May the PAVN pushed the 53rd from its positions and the perimeter was partially penetrated. Colonel Bá blocked the nose of the penetration by ensuring that the 53rd's reserve force was put in proper location; but he did not want to move an additional blocking force through Kontum at night. There was considerable risk that enemy units would break through the lines and capture the city. A new B-52 strike was requested for the base of the penetration. This request was denied by the MACV staff because the intended strike area was too close to a small village shown on the map. After considerable debate and analysis by the advisory staff, Truby remembered a technique taught at Fort Leavenworth and suggested to Bá that the troops at the nose of the penetration be withdrawn 500 yards (460 m) despite the obvious difficulty of such a nighttime maneuver. This would clear the threat to the town. Truby and Bá convinced Vann that if the ARVN forces could be pulled back during the cover of darkness, their safety concerns could be met. The request was approved by II Corps and MACV and the new strike was adjusted by the B-52 in flight while ARVN artillery continued heavy fire to hold enemy forces in place. The strike was delivered on schedule with devastating results as PAVN forces had massed to break the perimeter defense. The attack had been stopped and numerous tanks destroyed. The strike was decisive, for the first time since Tan Canh, the PAVN momentum had been broken. The three weakened PAVN divisions regrouped in the jungle surrounding Kontum.

=== Final attack on Kontum ===
The strike was decisive for the battle, but the PAVN still had superior numbers and quickly began to regroup. During this period, Rhotenberry, the advisor originally assigned to work with Bá, arrived in country. Vann returned Truby to his original job of overseeing other actions within II Corps.

During the next two weeks, the ARVN and PAVN forces tested each other. The ARVN forces responded to artillery attacks with their own artillery or by calling in Hawk's Claw helicopter fire. B-52 sorties were again used. However the PAVN had years of experience with the B-52s and knew not to mass troops as they had while trying to break the perimeter defense. At 03:45 on 20 May, the 53rd Regiment was attacked by the first of three all-out assaults from the north. On the third attack the 53rd was pushed from their positions. Throughout that day the 53rd tried to regain their position but the PAVN was now dug in. Rhotenberry, the division's new senior adviser, and Bá decided to pull up nine M41 tanks and to direct all that fire to the enemy position along with helicopter gunships.

The night of 20 May passed quietly until 05:00 on the 21st. The 44th Regiment received heavy indirect fire. Under the cover of this barrage, the PAVN 406th Sapper Battalion moved behind the 3/44th and cut Route 14 three kilometers northwest of Kontum City. At the same time another PAVN battalion penetrated between the 4/45th and 2/53rd creating a wedge in the ARVN front lines. Quickly and efficiently the 3/44th counterattacked south on Highway 14 while the 4/44th and 1/45th moved north along the highway. Supported by US gunships and TACAIR, the two forces linked up and cleared the road of the enemy sappers after fierce fighting. The wedge which formed between the 44th and 53rd deeply concerned Col. Bá. He quickly requested TACAIR and artillery preparations on the entrenched enemy. He then went to the site of the battle. The personal presence of Col. Bá inspired his men in their counterattack and was a key factor in the ejection of the PAVN and restoration of the front line. Two more assaults within the next two hours coincided with scheduled B-52 strikes on enemy attack positions, silencing the attackers. The fifth and final assault began at a little past 04:00 on 21 May. The fight was characterized by fierce hand-to-hand combat during which hand grenades were lobbed between the opposing forces. Altogether, five assaults were beaten off by a combination of ground and air fire, and the use of B-52 strikes in the vicinity of the front lines every hour.

On 21 May, a task force composed of the 2nd and 6th Ranger Groups and the 3rd Armored Squadron began an operation to clear Highway 14 southward to Pleiku. Several B-52 and TACAIR strikes of CBU-55s were placed on the PAVN 95B Regiment at the Chư Pao pass. Initially the attack was successful, but as ARVN forces came within B-40 range, the fighting became more intense. When several APCs and M-41 tanks were destroyed by the B-40, the armor spearhead halted against the entrenched forces.

In the early hours of 25 May, PAVN mortar and artillery fire increased enough to indicate preparation for a major attack. In the southern quadrant, the artillery fire kept the 23rd Division in their bunkers. Under the artillery cover, the PAVN sappers, some dressed in ARVN uniforms, moved into the buildings south of the Kontum Airfield.

In the early morning of 26 May, the PAVN attacked the 23rd Division from the north with tank/infantry teams. At first light, Hawk's Claw was able to destroy nine tanks, two machine guns, and one truck. This effectively stopped the momentum of the attack. Later in the day Bá threw a battalion of the 44th Regiment into the fight. This limited the enemy penetration of the ARVN lines. After dark, attacks on the ARVN 45th and 53rd Regiments increased, with the 45th facing the heaviest action. TACAIR support was diverted to support the regiment. Lieutenant Colonel Grant and Rhotenberry were able to divert two B-52 strikes scheduled for 02:30 on 27 May and this blunted the attack. That same morning the 44th Regiment woke to discover PAVN tank and infantry within their perimeter. The area hadn't been properly secured and T-54 tanks were within 50 yards (46 m) of the bunkers. If these PAVN units breached the 44th's defenses, they could pour into the city. The defenders were able to use M-72 LAW fire to slow the tanks. By dawn, Hawk's Claw helicopters arrived from Pleiku. The dense smoke obscured the action, but the Hawk's Claw crews were still able to destroy two T-54 tanks. With helicopters to neutralize the tanks, the ARVN infantry was able to stop the advance of the PAVN.

At 03:46 on 27 May, the indirect fire increased throughout the northern defensive perimeter, between 300 and 400 rounds fell by dawn. At 05:00, elements of the 53rd Regiment defending the 14th Armored Squadron compound were attacked by sappers. This was followed shortly by an attack against the 44th Regiment positions to the west. Elements of the 44th and 53rd Regiments, supported by the 8th Armored Squadron, attempted to dislodge the PAVN from the northern compounds. At the same time the territorial forces engaged in bitter house-to-house fighting in the southern flank where the PAVN were still dug in inside a school and some houses at the edge of the airfield.

The battle see-sawed back and forth on 28 May. The PAVN occupied bunkers and buildings in sections of the city and were too well fortified to be destroyed by air or artillery attacks. However, their ability to launch a sustained attack seemed to be gone. With US and South Vietnamese air superiority, PAVN troops could not receive adequate food and supplies from their bases in the jungle.

Maj. Gen. Toàn greets President Thiệu in Kontum

On 1 June, President Nguyễn Văn Thiệu flew into Kontum to assess the situation firsthand. Arriving in the early afternoon, he received a briefing as several PAVN rockets landed a few hundred meters away. Throughout the visit, the President frequently shook hands and chatted with the soldiers. The visit was regarded as a strong morale boost for the ARVN troops defending the city. After completing his visit, the presidential party left later that afternoon.

On 6 June, the PAVN's B3 Front Command mobilized their last reserve unit, the 66th Regiment to cover the withdrawal of all remaining within the town.

From 29 May to 8 June the ARVN forces went bunker to bunker cleaning out the remaining PAVN forces. On 9 June the city of Kontum was declared fully secure by the 23rd Division Commander, Bá, who had been promoted to Brigadier General. The combined efforts of the ARVN troops and US aviation units had finally stopped the massive assault.

== Aftermath ==
That same night Vann and his pilot were flying through the mountains. The night was rainy and there were low clouds. The pilot didn't realize his altitude and flew into the hillside. A Vietnamese account stated that the helicopter carrying him was shot down. The purpose of the flight was to deliver a celebration cake to the advisers and ARVN commanders for the Kontum victory. Vann had been key in developing a more subtle and flexible approach to the war, one based on winning over the hearts and minds of the local population while using the US military's traditional strengths. His death was a huge loss.

The Battle of Kontum, a key success during this period, was virtually ignored in the US. The victory was written off simply as an example of B-52 power. Certainly the hundreds of missions between February and June were a major element of the success, but the PAVN had neutralized this advantage in large part by using the jungle and attacking at night.

The other keys to success, in addition to the B-52 strikes, were the close integration of US advisers and their ARVN counterparts and the moment-to-moment edge provided by aviation units flying in support of the ARVN forces. If the ARVN forces had not been able to hold their ground, the battle would have been lost. The 23rd Division's determined defense under the leadership of Bá forced the PAVN forces to compensate by attempting a breakthrough of the perimeter. This exposed them to a decisive strike which killed a great many of their soldiers. Without these two elements, the 23rd Division might not have pulled itself together and successfully resisted three divisions of battle-hardened PAVN soldiers and armor units. Nevertheless, their capabilities and the leadership of Bá were of primary importance.

== See also ==
- Second Battle of Quảng Trị
- Battle of An Lộc

== Bibliography ==
=== Secondary Sources ===
- McKenna, Thomas P. "Kontum: The Battle to Save South Vietnam." University Press of Kentucky, 2011. ISBN 9780813133980 OCLC 711989000
