= Hoàng Minh Thảo =

Vietnamese general (1921–2008)

Colonel General Hoàng Minh Thảo

Personal details
- Born: Tạ Thái An; 25 October 1921 Kim Động, Hưng Yên, Tonkin (French protectorate)
- Died: 8 September 2008 (aged 86)
- Party: Communist Party of Vietnam
- Civilian awards: Ho Chi Minh Order
- Nickname: Tạ Quang

Military service
- Allegiance: Democratic Republic of Vietnam and later Vietnam
- Branch/service: People's Army of Vietnam
- Years of service: 1937–1996
- Rank: Colonel General
- Battles/wars: First Indochina War; Battle of Điện Biên Phủ; Vietnam War; Battle of Dak To; Battle of Ban Me Thuot
- Military awards: Hero of the People's Armed Forces (posthumously)

Hoàng Minh Thảo (born Tạ Thái An) (1921–2008) was a colonel-general in the People's Army of Vietnam active during the First Indochina War, and the Vietnam War. He commanded Việt Cộng forces in Battle of Dak To and Battle of Ban Me Thuot.

== Early years ==
Hoàng Minh Thảo was born as Tạ Thái An in Kim Động district of Hưng Yên province, Tonkin (French protectorate) in October 1921.

== Military career ==
During the First Indochina War, Hoàng Minh Thảo was assigned to the commander of War Zone 3 in 1945, then commander of Military Region 4 in 1949. One year later, he was assigned to the commander of newly formed 304th Brigade.

In the Battle of Điện Biên Phủ, Colonel Thảo commanded 304th Brigade besieging, attacking Isabelle positions (Vietnamese: phân khu Nam - Hồng Cúm). He was promoted to major general in 1959.

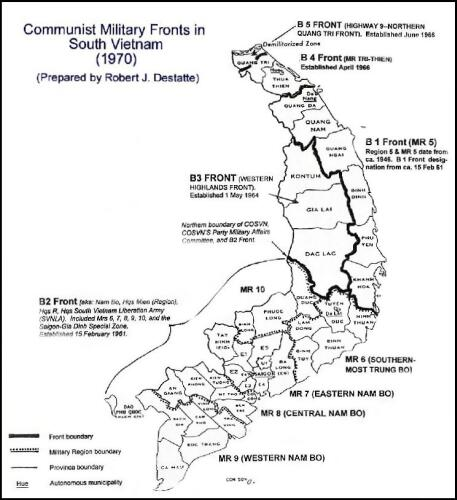
NLF Fronts and Military regions, 1970

In the Vietnam war, Gen. Thảo served nearly 10 years (1966 – 1975) in Tây Nguyên battlefield . He was assigned Deputy Commander of Tây Nguyên front (B3 Front) in 1966, Commander of Tây Nguyên front in 1968, then Deputy Commander of Military Region 5 (includes both B3 and B1 Fronts) in 1974.

== Awards and legacy ==
In 2023, CG Hoàng Minh Thảo was posthumously awarded the Hero of the People's Armed Forces.
