= Kontum Airfield =

Former military airfield in Vietnam

Kontum Airfield
- Kon Tum, Central Highlands in Vietnam
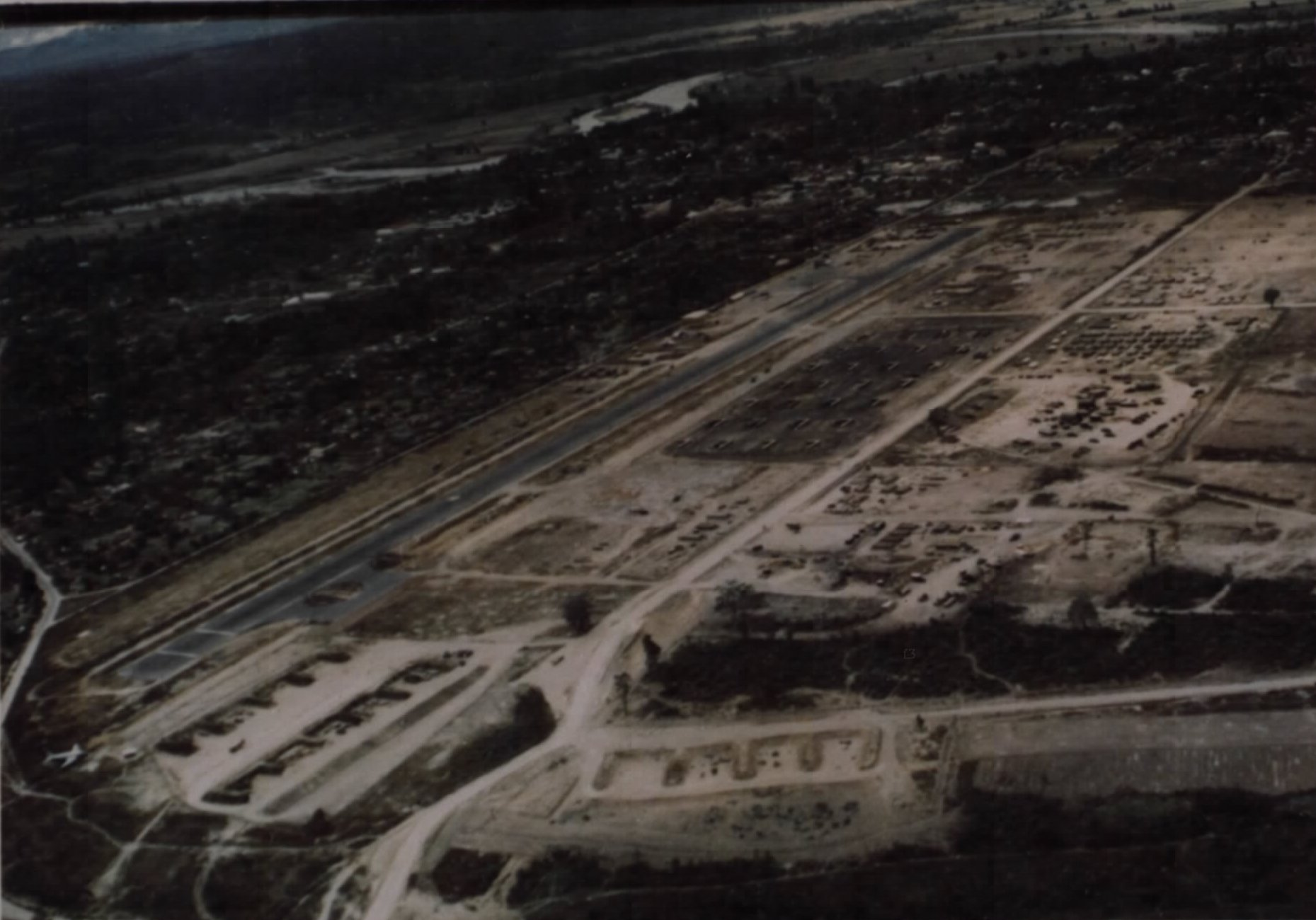
- An aerial view of Kontum Airfield in December 1967

Site information
- Operator: Army of the Republic of Vietnam (ARVN); United States Army (US Army)
- Condition: Abandoned

Location
- Shown within Vietnam
- Coordinates: 14°21′21″N 108°00′54″E

Site history
- Built: 1965
- Built by: Company A, 299th Engineer Battalion
- In use: 1965-1975
- Battles/wars: Vietnam War; Tet Offensive; Battle of Kontum

Airfield information
- Identifiers: IATA: KON
- Elevation: 1,804 feet (550 m) AMSL
Runways
Direction	Length and surface
09/27	3,600 feet (1,097 m) Asphalt

Kontum Airfield is a former U.S. Army and Army of the Republic of Vietnam (ARVN) base located in Kon Tum in the Central Highlands of Vietnam.

== History ==
Kontum Airfield was a major tactical airlift hub in the Central Highlands used extensively in the buildup on US forces in the area in 1965-6.

On 28 April 1966, an Air America Curtiss C-46D Commando crashed on takeoff. There were no fatalities, but the plane was written off.

In early 1967 Company A, 299th Engineer Battalion began improving the airfield building taxiways, ramps, roads and bivouac areas.

On 10 January 1968 Viet Cong (VC) sappers penetrated the airfield perimeter and destroyed several helicopters with Satchel charges, killing 7 Americans and wounding 25. An estimated 16 VC were killed in the attack.

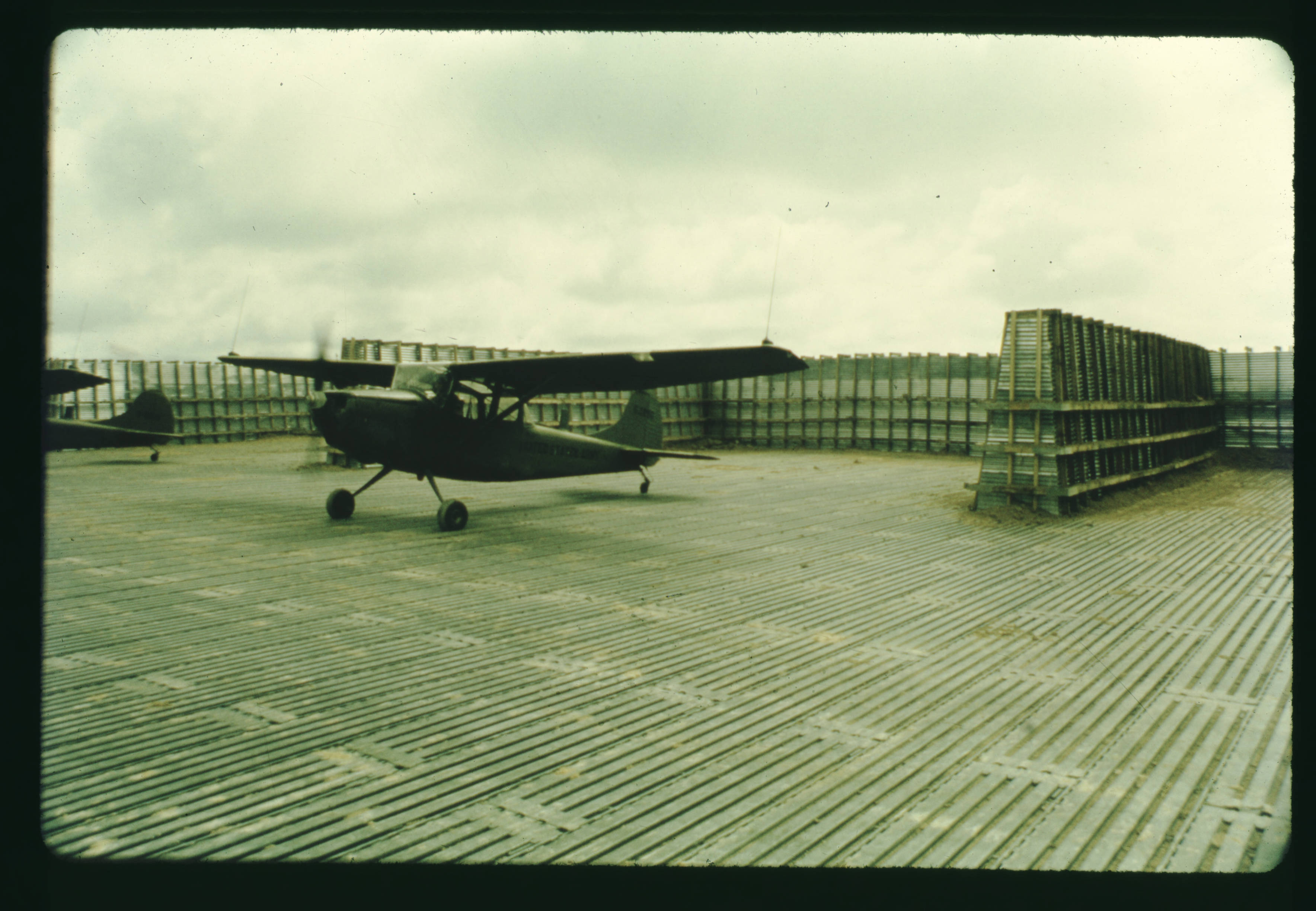
Aircraft revetments, 19 July 1968

At the time of the Tet Offensive in late January 1968 units based at the airfield were the 57th Assault Helicopter Company (57th AHC), Troop A, 2nd Squadron, 1st Cavalry Regiment (2/1 Cavalry), Company B, 299th Engineer Battalion and a company of Montagnard irregulars. At 02:12 on 30 January, a company from the People's Army of Vietnam (PAVN) 406th Sapper Battalion and a company from the VC 304th Local Force Battalion attacked the airfield. As the PAVN/VC penetrated the airfield defenses they were engaged by sentries and gunships from the 57th AHC stopping the PAVN attack 50 meters from the runway. The PAVN K6 Battalion of the 24th Regiment reinforced the attack and launched a new assault which was countered by two M48 tanks and four M113 armored personnel carriers from Troop A, 2/1 Cavalry, which attacked the right flank of the PAVN forcing them to retreat. The PAVN soon regrouped and attacked the armor with rocket-propelled grenades forcing them to retreat. At 09:30 Task Force Delta, comprising two helicopter borne rifle platoons and Company D, 7th Squadron, 17th Cavalry Regiment, landed at the airfield and moved north to attack the PAVN/VC in the city. That evening the PAVN/VC attacked the airfield again but failed to penetrate the defenses. On 31 January Company D, 1st Battalion, 22nd Infantry Regiment was landed at the airfield. The PAVN hit the airfield with 122-mm. rockets on 1 February but made no further ground attacks. On the evening of 1 February two companies from the 1st Battalion, 12th Infantry Regiment were flown into the airfield securing its northern perimeter. By 4 February the city had been secured and normal operations resumed at the airfield.

The airfield was the scene of heavy fighting in April-May 1972 during the Battle of Kontum, part of the PAVN's Easter Offensive. On 21 April PAVN artillery fire damaged an Air Vietnam plane, killing a flight attendant. On 24 April PAVN artillery fire damaged a USAF Lockheed C-130 Hercules and destroyed a Republic of Vietnam Air Force (RVNAF) Fairchild C-123 Provider, the repaired C-130 flew out on 1 May. On 15 May 1972 a PAVN artillery attack on the airfield destroyed a C-130 as it took off killing all but 1 crewman and damaged 2 other C-130s and 2 C-123s. Another rocket/artillery attack on 23 May destroyed another C-130. By 25 May the airfield was closed to traffic and did not reopen until 8 June when the PAVN, defeated in their attack on Kontum, withdrew from the city.

On 26 October 1972 a PAVN rocket attack on the base killed an American officer of Troop H, 17th Cavalry Regiment which was staging through the base. First Lieutenant Carlos Pedrosa was the last wartime casualty his unit would experience in the Vietnam War.
