= Brian Thacker =

United States Army officer and Medal of Honor recipient

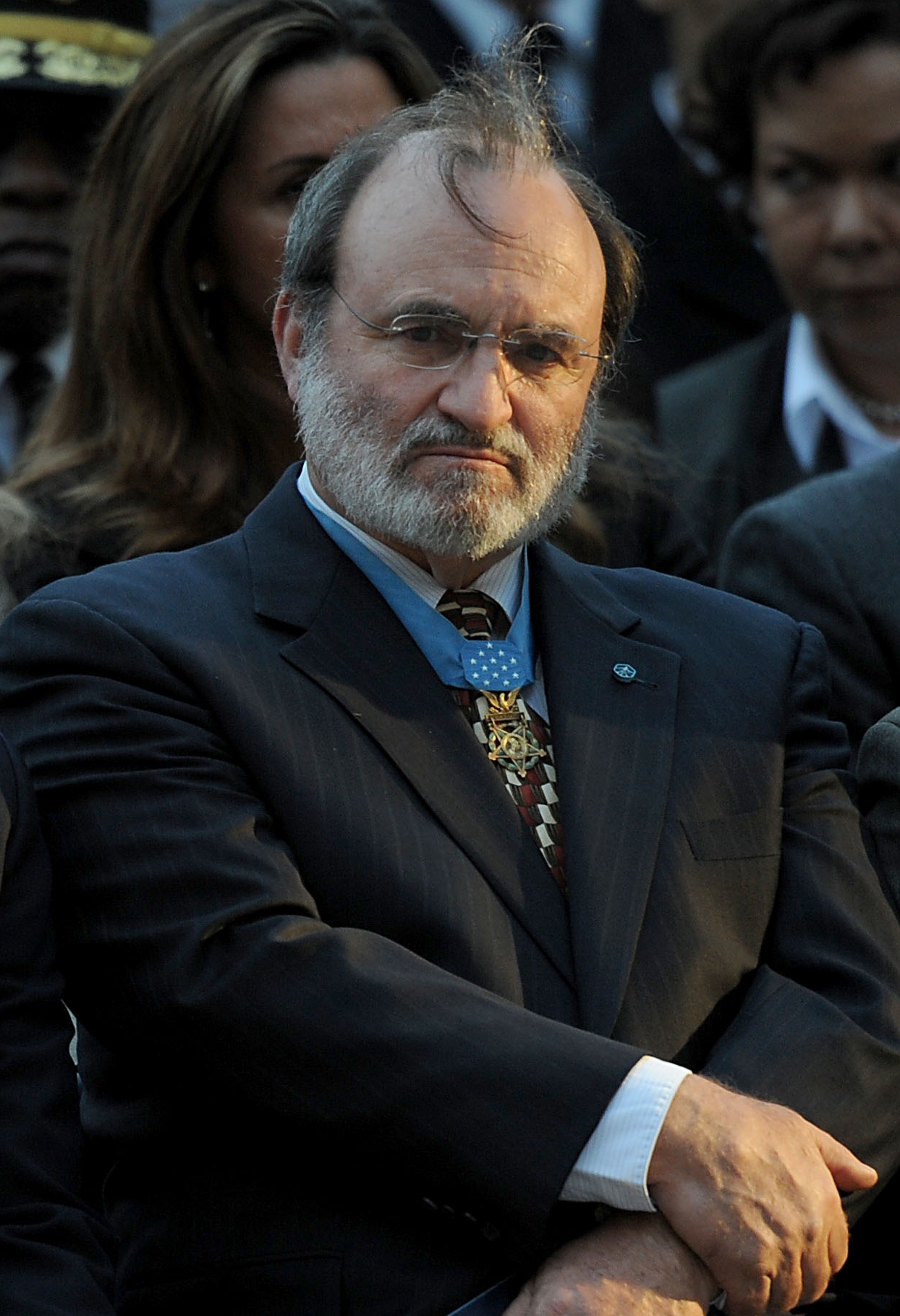
- Thacker in 2008
- Born: April 25, 1945 (age 81); Columbus, Ohio
- Military career
- Allegiance: United States
- Branch: United States Army
- Service years: 1969–1971
- Rank: Lieutenant
- Units: Battery A, 1st Battalion, 92nd Field Artillery Regiment
- Conflicts: Vietnam War
- Awards: Medal of Honor

Brian Miles Thacker (born April 25, 1945) is a former United States Army officer and a recipient of the United States military's highest decoration for valor, the Medal of Honor, for his actions in the Vietnam War.

== Military career ==
Following high school, Thacker attended Weber State University in Utah.

Thacker joined the United States Army from Salt Lake City, Utah, in June 1969. By March 31, 1971 he was serving as a first lieutenant in Battery A of 1st Battalion, 92nd Field Artillery Regiment. On that day, Thacker's base in Kontum Province, Republic of Vietnam, was attacked by North Vietnamese Army forces. He assisted in the defense of the base and, when evacuation became necessary, he stayed behind to cover the retreat. Trapped behind enemy lines, Thacker was able to evade capture until being rescued by friendly forces eight days later.

== Medal of Honor citation ==
First Lieutenant Thacker's official Medal of Honor citation reads:

For conspicuous gallantry and intrepidity in action at the risk of his life above and beyond the call of duty. 1st Lt. Thacker, Field Artillery, Battery A, distinguished himself while serving as the team leader of an Integrated Observation System collocated with elements of 2 Army of the Republic of Vietnam units at Firebase 6. A numerically superior North Vietnamese Army force launched a well-planned, dawn attack on the small, isolated, hilltop fire base. Employing rockets, grenades, flame-throwers, and automatic weapons, the enemy forces penetrated the perimeter defenses and engaged the defenders in hand-to-hand combat. Throughout the morning and early afternoon, 1st Lt. Thacker rallied and encouraged the U.S. and Republic of Vietnam soldiers in heroic efforts to repulse the enemy. He occupied a dangerously exposed observation position for a period of 4 hours while directing friendly air strikes and artillery fire against the assaulting enemy forces. His personal bravery and inspired leadership enabled the outnumbered friendly forces to inflict a maximum of casualties on the attacking enemy forces and prevented the base from being overrun. By late afternoon, the situation had become untenable. 1st Lt. Thacker organized and directed the withdrawal of the remaining friendly forces. With complete disregard for his personal safety, he remained inside the perimeter alone to provide covering fire with his M16 rifle until all other friendly forces had escaped from the besieged fire base. Then, in an act of extraordinary heroism, he called for friendly artillery fire on his own position to allow his comrades more time to withdraw safely from the area and, at the same time, inflict even greater casualties on the enemy forces. Although wounded and unable to escape from the area himself, he successfully eluded the enemy forces by hiding in a bamboo canopy whilst enemy flak guns being set up around where he was, his position was eventually recaptured by friendly forces 8 days later where he then crawled up hill emancipated. The extraordinary courage and selflessness displayed by 1st Lt. Thacker were an inspiration to his comrades and are in the highest traditions of the military service.

== See also ==
- List of Medal of Honor recipients for the Vietnam War
- New Hampshire Historical Marker No. 266: Pinkerton Academy / Old Academy Building
