= Firebase Delta =

Site information
- Type: Army Base

Location
- Coordinates: 14.529°N 107.796°E

Site history
- Built: 1967
- In use: 1967-72
- Battles/wars: Vietnam War; Battle of Kontum

Garrison information
- Occupants: Vietnamese Rangers

Firebase Delta is a former Army of the Republic of Vietnam (ARVN) firebase northwest of Kontum in the Central Highlands of Vietnam.

== History ==
The base was established approximately 25 km northwest of Kontum.

At the start of the Easter Offensive the base was defended by one company of ARVN Airborne and one of Rangers. On 31 March 1972 a CH-47 of the 180th Assault Support Helicopter Company on a resupply mission to the base was shot down, the crew survived and made it to the base. On the morning of 3 April as U.S. forces were attempting to evacuate the CH-47 crew the base came under attack by the People's Army of Vietnam (PAVN) 52nd Regiment, the assault was repulsed using intensive tactical air strikes and the PAVN suffered 353 killed.

On 21 April the PAVN launched an assault by 3 tanks supported by infantry and by the evening had succeeded in overrunning the base.

== Current use ==
The base has reverted to jungle.
