= Thomas P. McKenna =

United States Army officer and author

- Born: July 23, 1930; Davenport, Iowa, U.S.
- Died: November 5, 2021 (aged 91); Stowe, Vermont, U.S.
- Military career
- Allegiance: United States of America
- Branch: United States Army
- Service years: 1948–1970
- Rank: Lieutenant Colonel
- Unit: 82nd Airborne Division
- Conflicts: Vietnam War: Battle of Kontum

Thomas Patrick McKenna (July 23, 1930 – November 5, 2021) was a United States Army officer and author. His book Kontum: The Battle to Save South Vietnam won the 2013 William E. Colby Award.

== Early life ==
McKenna was born on July 23, 1930, and raised in Nebraska and Florida. He was a Boy Scout and made Eagle rank.

== Military career ==
Upon his graduation from Castle Heights Military Academy in 1948, McKenna enlisted in the army, and served with the 82nd Airborne Division. After a year of service, he was sent to West Point Military Academy. McKenna spent a total of 22 years in the military.

His military education included stints at the Parachute and Glider School, Basic and Advanced Infantry Officer Courses, Ranger School, Airborne School, Pathfinder School, and the Command and General Staff College. McKenna also obtained a master's degree in history from the University of Kansas.

He was stationed in Germany, Italy, Korea, and Vietnam, spending the last of his military career as an advisor to South Vietnam. It was during his time as an advisor to South Vietnamese that the Battle of Kontum occurred.

== Books ==
- McKenna, Thomas P. (2011). Kontum: The Battle to Save South Vietnam. University Press of Kentucky. ISBN 9780813133980. JSTOR j.ctt2jcmsd.
- McKenna, Thomas P. (2014). From Vicksburg to Cedar Creek: The 22nd Iowa Volunteer Infantry in the Civil War. Camp Pope Publishing. ISBN 9781929919567.
