= 22nd Division (South Vietnam) =

- Sư đoàn 22
- 22nd Division Insignia
- Active: 1959 – 1975
- Country: South Vietnam
- Branch: Army of the Republic of Vietnam
- Role: Infantry
- Part of: II Corps
- Garrison/HQ: Ba Gi
- Engagements: Vietnam War: Operation Double Eagle/Operation Masher; Operation Hawthorne; Operation Dai Bang 800; Operation Geronimo; Operation Pershing; Operation Francis Marion; Battle of Kontum; War of the flags; Battle of Trung Nghia; Fall of Saigon

Commanders
- Notable commanders: Linh Quang Vien; Lê Đức Đạt; Nguyễn Thanh Sằng; Nguyễn Văn Hiếu; Lê Ngọc Triển; Phan Đình Niệm

The 22nd Division (Vietnamese: Sư đoàn 22; Chữ Hán: 師團22) of the Army of the Republic of Vietnam (ARVN) was part of the II Corps that oversaw the region of the Central Highlands north of the capital Saigon. The 22nd Division was based in Ba Gi near the south central coast.

== History ==
The Division was raised initially as the 2nd Light and 4th Light Divisions in 1955. The 4th Light Division was renamed the 14th Light Division in 1956. Both were combined to become the 4th Infantry Division, which was later renamed the 22nd Division in 1959.

=== 1965 ===
On 8 February in Bình Định province, elements of the Vietcong (VC) Military Region 5's 2nd and 10th Regiments ambushed two companies of the 40th Infantry and an M113 armored personnel carrier troop in Nhong Pass, 5km north of Phú Mỹ, as they drove north along Highway 1 to relieve Gia Huu. After 57mm recoilless rifles had destroyed two M113s, the armored troop pulled back, then withdrew entirely when it ran out of ammunition. Airstrikes could not prevent the VC from overrunning the infantry and mauling additional troops that came in support. Four US advisers managed to escape to Phú Mỹ. The ARVN lost 280 casualties and considerable equipment. VC losses from the battle and two subsequent days of aerial bombardment reportedly numbered several hundred. The debacle, along with other actions, left the 40th Infantry Regiment combat ineffective, with just 522 men present for duty.

On 22 February, the 3rd Battalion, 42nd Infantry, ran into an enemy force armed with AK-47s and RPG-2s between Đăk Tô and the Cambodian border. Outclassed, the unit recoiled in disorder. The next day, the regimental commander, Lieutenant colonel Lai Van Chu, personally led a second battalion in a counterattack that captured some of these new weapons. In the process, the South Vietnamese identified their foe as the People's Army of Vietnam (PAVN) 101st Regiment. Military Assistance Command, Vietnam's (MACV) strict rules required further confirmation before it would add the unit to its enemy order of battle in South Vietnam.

On 1 March, Brigadier general Nguyen Thanh Sang replaced Sub-Brigadier general Nguyen Xuan Thinh as Division commander.

On 15 April, two infantry battalions from the 41st Infantry, an armored cavalry troop, and two scout companies attacked the VC 801st Battalion near Dai Khoang village, 10km northwest of Phù Cát district. VC losses were 106 killed and three captured. ARVN losses were seven dead and 20 wounded.

On 19 April, the 41st Infantry attacked two VC companies 16km north of Qui Nhon. VC losses were 73 killed and captured 23 captured along with 16 weapons. ARVN losses were five killed and 19 wounded. Ten Americans were killed including eight killed when VC .50-caliber machine guns shot down two US Army helicopters.

On 4 May, the VC seized the coastal hamlet of Thein Nghiep in Binh Thuan province. A Regional Forces company sent to investigate halted at 09:30 when it came upon a roadblock manned by two VC companies on the Phan Thiết-Hai Long Highway, about 7km east of Phan Thiết. Binh Thuan’s province chief dispatched the understrength 1st Battalion, 47th Infantry, two Regional Forces companies and two M8 armored cars. After an airstrike hit the roadblock at 10:30, a USAF forward air controller reported that up to 500 VC were digging in on a hill overlooking the highway. After several hours of airstrikes, at 17:30, as the South Vietnamese commander launched his two M8s toward the roadblock. Meant as a distraction, they smashed through the obstacle. Then, with the assistance of a Regional Forces company, the M8s pursued the VC, killing about 30. The rout spread alarm through the rest of the VC, just as the 1st Battalion launched their assault and, by nightfall, the VC were in full flight. The allies counted 64 bodies, including a company commander, and captured seven weapons and ten prisoners, including another company commander and a political officer. They estimated that the VC had carried off another 50 dead. ARVN losses were six dead and 16 wounded.

On 3 June, the PAVN 18th Regiment ambushed the 1st Battalion, 40th Infantry, on Highway 7 between Cheo Reo and the Le Bac bridge. After the battalion retreated 1.5km, the PAVN ambushed it again. The ARVN broke and fled in disorder. The battalion's wounded senior adviser called for medical evacuation for himself and two other injured Americans. Helicopter gunships covered the evacuation, then joined fixed-wing aircraft in bombarding the area for the rest of the day. South Vietnamese losses were described as heavy.

On 7 July, the PAVN captured Đăk Tô and rebuffed an attempt by the 42nd Infantry to regain the post, killing the regiment's commander and seriously wounding his adviser. Four ARVN battalions eventually retook the town.

On 17 July, the Division and eight reserve battalions launched Operation Than Phong to reopen Highway 19 and deliver supplies to Pleiku.

=== 1966 ===
From 28 January to 17 February 1966, as part of Operation Double Eagle the Division operated with the US 3rd Marine Division's Task Force Delta in the coastal areas northeast of Đức Phổ. In early February 1966 as part of the complementary Operation Masher the Division's 40th Regiment blocked the southern access to the An Lão Valley while the 2nd and 3rd Brigades, 1st Cavalry Division swept the valley for VC. In early March in the final phase of the operation the Division surrounded the Cay Giap mountains, 5 miles (8.0 km) east of Bồng Sơn while the 1st Cavalry Division swept the area.

From 2–21 June 1966, in Operation Hawthorne the Division's 42nd Regiment, the ARVN 21st Ranger Battalion and the US 101st Airborne Division fought the PAVN 24th Regiment near the village of Toumorong, Kon Tum Province.

From 2–24 October 1966, in Operation Dai Bang 800 three battalions from the Division searched the Phu Cat Mountains in Bình Định province for the PAVN 12th Regiment in coordination with the 1st Cavalry Division's Operation Irving and the Republic of Korea Army (ROK) Capital Division's Operation Maeng Ho 6. In an engagement on 13 October an airborne task force from the Division killed 135 PAVN/VC and estimated that a further 85 had been killed by US helicopters.

From 31 October to 4 December 1966, in Operation Geronimo the Division's 47th Regiment, elements of the 101st Airborne Division and 4th Infantry Division and the ROK 9th Infantry Division engaged the PAVN 18B Regiment west of Tuy Hòa. PAVN losses were 150 killed and 76 captured.

=== 1967 ===
From 12 February 1967 to 19 January 1968, the Division participated in Operation Pershing with the US 1st Cavalry Division and the 3rd Brigade, 25th Infantry Division and the ROK Capital Division in Bình Định province. Total PAVN/VC losses were 5401 killed.

From 6 April to 11 October 1967, the Division's 42nd Regiment participated in Operation Francis Marion with the US 4th Infantry Division and 173rd Airborne Brigade against PAVN base areas in Pleiku, Darlac and the Kon Tum Provinces. Total PAVN losses were 1600 killed.

On 17 June 1967, a battalion of the PAVN 24th Regiment, reinforced with a battalion of the 40th Artillery Regiment, attacked the headquarters of the 42nd Regiment at Tân Cảnh Base Camp.

In late July 1967, the 42nd Regiment was sent into positions north of Đắk Tô as part of Operation Greeley. On 4 August, the 1/42nd encountered the PAVN on a hilltop west of Dak Seang Camp, setting off a three-day battle that drew in the ARVN 8th Airborne Battalion. The ARVN forces found 189 PAVN bodies, large quantities of ammunition and equipment, and a sophisticated regimental command post with training areas and an elaborate mock-up of the Dak Seang Camp.

In 1967, soldiers of the Division attacked and robbed inhabitants of a protected hamlet and members of the local Civil Operations and Revolutionary Development Support (CORDS) team. After the high command investigated the case, the guilty parties were beaten and placed in regimental disciplinary cages. But the chief of the MACV Revolutionary Support Directorate, General William A. Knowlton, termed the incident commonplace and demanded that the ARVN generals do more to halt such occurrences.

=== 1968 ===
In February 1968, Lieutenant colonel William A. Donald (USMC), a MACV CORDS evaluator, made a detailed examination of one of the Division's regiments providing area security. He described the regimental commander as "astute," with "an impressive grasp of VC/PAVN tactics and the military significance of terrain," but also as "politically motivated" and "a supreme practitioner of caution." His subordinate battalion commanders were capable, but lacked aggressiveness and imagination. There were few company or platoon-level operations, he noted, and leadership at the lower levels and on the staffs was minimal. Donald pointed out that almost all operations were planned by the regimental commander, with little assistance from his nominal staff who appeared to serve primarily as bodyguards and aides. Both the regimental and battalion commanders acted as their own intelligence officers, even operating spy networks with their personal funds and friends. He also reported that unit commanders habitually employed internal informants, enforced discipline through whippings or confining soldiers to makeshift "tiger cages" for military infractions, and used prisoners and VC suspects as laborers. The US advisers interviewed by Donald held that the entire unit was run by an inside clique of favorites, "armed with an uncanny flair for mediocrity," who, despite spending their nights at home when their troops were in the field, were decorated "with awesome regularity." Not surprisingly, Donald reported that the unit was deficient in almost all military activities, allowing the local VC to dominate the countryside, especially during the hours of darkness. He also noted that the Division commander had not visited the regiment or the battalions in several months, and no one appeared concerned over what the unit did or did not accomplish.

On 5 May 1968, at the start of the May Offensive PAVN artillery hit Kon Tum, Pleiku and Buôn Ma Thuột causing little damage. A battalion from the PAVN 32nd Regiment attacked a convoy on Highway 14 south of Kon Tum, but the ambush was quickly broken up by the arrival of the Division's 3rd Armored Cavalry Squadron. PAVN losses were 122 killed.

In mid-1968, at the instigation of II Corps commander General Lữ Mộng Lan, I Field Force, Vietnam commander General William R. Peers ordered the US 173rd Airborne Brigade to pair up with the Division in Bình Định province in what was almost a replica of Operation Fairfax. The participating US units brought substantial air, artillery, engineer, and other support to the combined endeavor from their parent units, and American and Vietnamese commanders generally collocated command posts, shared a common area of operation, and planned and carried out operations together. In the process the American officers tried to increase pressure on local enemy forces through intensive patrolling and to encourage ARVN battalion, company, and platoon-level leadership through longer, more decentralized operations. Vietnamization, as later conceived in 1969, was not an objective, and, in fact, the entire effort represented a return to the old strategy of pacification, with American combat operations now tied much closer to the overall task of local security.

=== 1969-1971 ===
In March 1969, as he left command of I Field Force, Peers assessed the Division as "potentially the best division in II Corps," that just sits "in the cities and towns and outlying areas for weeks on end... [with a] continual tendency to revert back to the territorial function."

In 1969, General Lê Ngọc Triển replaced General Nguyễn Văn Hiếu as Division commander.

From 5–25 May 1970, the 40th Regiment participated in Operation Binh Tay I an early phase of the Cambodian Campaign with the US 1st and 2nd Brigades, 4th Infantry Division. On 17 May the US forces returned to South Vietnam, leaving the area to the ARVN. During Operation Binh Tay II from 14–26 May, the Division moved against Base Area 702. The second phase of the operation was carried out between 20 May and 27 June against Base Area 701 by elements of the Division.

In December 1970, as the US 4th Infantry Division left Vietnam, the Division moved into Pleiku with its 47th Regiment, taking responsibility for the 24th Special Tactical Zone and the defense of the northern Highlands.

The dissolution of the 24th Special Tactical Zone headquarters along the Laotian border and the transfer of its responsibilities to the Division had not brought any noticeable improvement to the Highlands. Local American and South Vietnamese cross-border incursions there had amounted to only minor raids. The 42nd Regiment had continued its decline begun during the Ben Het battles of 1969, and neither the 42nd nor the 47th Regiments had done well during the struggle for Dak Seang Camp in April 1970. I Field Force, Vietnam commander General Arthur S. Collins Jr. regarded the other five ARVN regiments in the zone as acceptable, but saw their "lack of aggressiveness" as a "persistent" and "fatal weakness."" "We need more fighters and fewer shadow boxers," Collins opined, reckoning that "we have perhaps overadvised them to the point where some of the lack of initiative... might be traced to overactive advisors." In his opinion, ARVN units were "no match" for their North Vietnamese opponents, and ARVN commanders relied too heavily on American air and artillery support now that it was available in quantity. In combat, they were simply unwilling to close with enemy forces. "The failure is one of leadership... and one of will." but, Collins had to conclude, "the one thing that can be said is that ARVN soldiers are doing the fighting and taking the casualties." The senior US adviser to the 2nd Battalion, 42nd Regiment concluded that the primary Vietnamese problem was still poor leadership: "The only time they fight is when they are cornered and have to fight." He predicted that "in the end, when the American forces do pullout, the PAVN will move back in" and that, judging by the punishment the PAVN had already taken from American firepower and survived, "the South Vietnamese will not be able to stop them.

=== Easter Offensive ===
In early February 1972, in response to intelligence reports of a PAVN buildup including tanks and artillery in the Central Highlands, II Corps commander General Ngô Du moved the Division's headquarters and 47th Regiment to Tân Cảnh Base Camp to join the 42nd Regiment already located there. Elements of the 19th Armored Cavalry Squadron were attached to the Division to support its organic 14th Cavalry Regiment equipped with M-41 light tanks. The armored units would be deployed forward at Ben Het Camp which was regarded as the most likely direction of a PAVN armored attack.

Since the start of the Easter Offensive at the end of March, the Division's base areas had come under increasing PAVN artillery and rocket fire, which had gone from 20-50 rounds per day in March to up to 1000 per day by mid-April. During early April the 47th Regiment withdrew to Đắk Tô Base Camp, while the 42nd Regiment and one Battalion of the 41st Regiment were at Tân Cảnh supported by armor and artillery. In addition Airborne and Rangers occupied a string of firebases along a backbone of mountains stretching towards Kontum nicknamed Rocket Ridge. On 23 April, the PAVN 2nd Division started their attack on Tân Cảnh by hitting the ARVN tanks with AT-3 missiles and this was followed by a direct hit on the 42nd Regiment command bunker injuring the senior U.S. Adviser and several of the ARVN commanders and severely undermining the confidence of Colonel Lê Đức Đạt the 22nd Division commander. By midday all five of the M-41 tanks in the base and several more bunkers had been destroyed by the missiles. At 19:00 PAVN rocket fire ignited the base ammunition dump At 21:00 a column of 18 PAVN tanks was spotted in the area, a United States Air Force (USAF) AC-130A gunship arrived at 23:00 and began to engage the T-54 tanks with its 105 mm cannon. Three T-54s were disabled but later recovered by the PAVN. At midnight the tank column turned towards Tân Cảnh and the ARVN artillery began firing on the column until stopped by PAVN counterbattery fire. Two bridges on the approach to Tân Cảnh were abandoned without being destroyed. The ARVN organised hunter-killer teams and these destroyed two tanks.

Just before 06:00 on 24 April, the PAVN tanks attacked Tân Cảnh in two columns. One column of T-54s attacked the main gate, the other moving to secure the airstrip. The advance of the tanks caused the 900 support troops to panic. The new command bunker was hit by further artillery fire destroying the radio antennas. With the collapse of all command and control on the base, the American advisers abandoned the command bunker and moved to a new position to call in airstrikes, however fog made such airstrikes impossible. At dawn the senior US adviser John Paul Vann arrived over Tân Cảnh in his OH-58A and made contact with the advisers who had escaped from the base perimeter. Vann landed and six advisers squeezed into the helicopter while frightened ARVN troops hung onto the skids. The helicopter flew to Đắk Tô Base Camp to drop off the passengers and then flew back to Tân Cảnh where they picked up the remaining three advisers, however the helicopter was swarmed by panicky ARVN and crashed on takeoff. Another helicopter came in and picked up Vann, his pilot and the three advisers and flew them to Pleiku. One hour after the main PAVN attack on Tân Cảnh commenced, the PAVN began their attack on Đắk Tô. A UH-1H helicopter #69-15715 landed to evacuate the six U.S. advisers who had been rescued from the Tân Cảnh perimeter, this helicopter was hit by PAVN anti-aircraft fire and crashed, five passengers and crew were killed in the crash while five survived, evaded capture and were recovered up 13 days later. The PAVN penetrated the base perimeter suffering heavy losses, the remaining U.S. advisers called in airstrikes as the morning fog cleared but by 10:00 the 47th Regiment commander had lost contact with most of his subordinates and the command group evacuated the command bunker for a bunker in the inner perimeter. A T-54 moved into the base and began direct fire on the command post, the two remaining M-41s engaged the T-54, however their 76 mm guns had no apparent effect on the T-54 which quickly knocked out both M-41s. A relief column of M-41s supported by infantry arrived from Ben Het Camp around this time, but all the M-41s were knocked out by B-40 rockets and recoilless rifle fire and the infantry dispersed. With the failure of this counterattack and the loss of command and control the ARVN forces began to evacuate the base towards the south. As the ARVN attempted to cross the Dak Poko river they came under intense PAVN fire and the senior U.S. adviser LTC Robert Brownlee disappeared during this engagement. At 20:00 the 47th Regiment command group attempted to escape the base and by 04:30 on 25 April after losing several men to PAVN fire escaped the base perimeter and were recovered the following day.

On 25 April, the PAVN mopped up the remaining ARVN positions around Tân Cảnh/Đắk Tô. The Division had ceased to exist as a fighting unit, the Division commander and his entire staff had disappeared and the PAVN had captured 23 105mm and 7 155 mm howitzers and large supplies of ammunition and stores. With the loss of the main camps, the remaining firebases along Rocket Ridge were abandoned and the PAVN had a clear approach to Kontum.

Meanwhile, on the coastal lowlands the PAVN 3rd Division and VC units succeeded in cutting Highway 1 at Bồng Sơn and attacking the three isolated northern districts, forcing the 40th and 41st Regiments to abandon their major bases at Landing Zone English and in Bồng Sơn. This together with the attacks against Kontum threatened to cut South Vietnam in half.

In early May, the remnants of the 42nd and 47th Regiments which had been incorporated into the defense of Kontum were replaced by the arriving units of the 23rd Division and withdrawn to Bình Định Province for refitting.

The rehabilitation of the Division, now under the command of Brigadier General Phan Đình Niệm, slowly restored its combat effectiveness and in July the Division cleared Highway 1 and recapturing the lost districts.

Although the Division had incurred heavy losses during the Easter Offensive, the Division was somewhat aggressive in moving against PAVN bases in Bình Định Province and in securing the most important lines of communication, Highway 1 along the coast and Highway 19 which climbs westward over the Annamite Range to Pleiku. Security on the latter route, whose steep grades, blind curves, defiles and many bridges created ideal opportunities for ambush, was being provided by the 3rd and 19th Armored Cavalry Squadrons. The Division's four regiments were deployed as follows: the 40th was in northern Bình Định in the area of the Bồng Sơn pass; the 41st was in Tam Quan, the northernmost district of Bình Định; the 42nd was in reserve in Hoài Ân District; and the 47th was providing security around Phù Cừ District on Highway 1. Reinforcing the Division in Binh Dinh were the 14th Armored Cavalry Squadron in Bong Son and two regiments of Rangers, the 4th Ranger Group east of Tam Quan, and the 6th east of Phù Cừ.

=== 1973-4 ===
During the War of the flags that preceded the signing of the Paris Peace Accords on 23 January 1973, elements of the PAVN 12th Regiment, 3rd Division, moved from bases in the An Lão valley toward the Tam Quan lowlands of northeast Bình Định Province. Beginning on the 24th and lasting until the 28th, the attacks were designed to fix the 41st Regiment in its bases and support the attack of the PAVN 2nd Division just to the north at Sa Huỳnh Base. South of the Lai Giang River, in Hoài Ân District, the rest of the PAVN 3rd Division attacked government outposts and attempted to prevent the deployment of the Division. On 28 January, the VC began their attacks along Highway 1 and in the hamlets and villages, successfully cutting the highway just south of the Bồng Sơn pass and in several places in Phú Yên Province. Farther south, in Khánh Hòa, other attempts to cut Highway 1 were unsuccessful. Although contacts were light and scattered in Khánh Hòa Province, the PAVN/VC succeeded in interdicting Highway 21, temporarily isolating Ban Me Thuot from the coast. By 28 January, a number of hamlets in Phú Yên were under PAVN/VC control, but hard fighting by RF and PF succeeded by 2 February in eliminating PAVN/VC control in all but two hamlets. By the 5th all of Highway 1 was back under government control, although the route remained closed to traffic until all destroyed bridges were repaired. Although the PAVN/VC seemed to enjoy great chances for success in Bình Định and Phú Yên Provinces, it was clear by the first week of February that they had failed to achieve any significant gains and the PAVN/VC forces had incurred extremely heavy losses.

In August 1973, the 42nd Regiment replaced the 44th Regiment, 23rd Division fighting the Battle of Trung Nghia. On 1 September 1973 the 42nd Regiment began their final assault on Trung Nghia which was cleared of all PAVN by 7 September and the 42nd Regiment entered Polei Krong on 16 September. During the rest of the month mopping-up operations cleared PAVN remnants from the slopes of Ngoc Bay Mountain, while skirmishing between the ARVN Rangers and elements of the 95B Regiment continued around Plei Mrong.

In early October 1973, II Corps commander General Nguyễn Văn Toàn directed that operations in Bình Định be turned over to the province chief and that only the 40th Regiment remain in the coastal province. BG Niệm moved his command post to Thanh An District, Pleiku. The 47th Regiment was west of Pleiku with the 21st Ranger Group advancing in the direction of Plei Djereng Camp on Provincial Route 509. In mid-October the 40th was airlifted into Pleiku and assigned to operate west of Pleiku generally along Provincial Route 565. The 41st Regiment, with the 21st Tank Regiment was moving on Highway 19 toward Thanh Giao; the 42nd Regiment was in reserve. On the afternoon of 23 October, the 2nd Battalion, 40th Regiment fought a fierce engagement with a PAVN battalion, supported by five T-54 tanks, with heavy losses on both sides.

In late November 1973, the Division pulled back from western Pleiku in order to assume the defense of Kontum, vacated by the departing 23rd Division which was heavily engaged in the Battle of Quang Duc.

In August 1974, II Corps deployed the 42nd Regiment to reinforce Firebase 711 in response to a threatened attack by the PAVN 320th Division against Plei Me (13.617°N 107.917°E). When II Corps moved the 42nd Regiment back to Binh Dinh Province the PAVN launched their long-awaited assault on Plei Me. Also in August the 40th Regiment was attached to the 23rd Division and it secured the northwestern approaches to Kontum.

=== 1975 ===
In January the Division was engaged in operations against the PAVN the 3rd Division at the entrance of the An Lão Valley in Bình Định province. These attacks were designed to preempt offensive operations by the 3rd Division in northern Bình Định. In early January, the 40th and 42nd Regiments held all key hills at the entrance to the An Lão Valley and successfully repelled repeated attempts by the PAVN 141st Regiment, 3rd Division to dislodge them. The 141st Regiment suffered heavy casualties and soon had to pull back. Attacks against ARVN positions diminished in intensity during February and were limited to artillery. But high casualties alone had not caused the lull, rather, a new mission had been assigned to the PAVN 3rd Division. The first indications of this reached Niệm in early January when a prisoner of war from the 18th Signal Battalion, 3rd Division, disclosed the presence of a 3rd Division reconnaissance party along Route 19 in the vicinity of An Khê and Binh Khê. The Vĩnh Thạnh Valley, sometimes called the Song Con Valley for the Côn River which flowed south through it, ended at Binh Khê where the river turned eastward toward the sea and formed the broad fertile delta above Qui Nhơn. The valley, which began in the rugged, forested highlands north of Binh Khê, was the natural avenue of approach for the 3rd Division to attack ARVN positions along Route 19. RVNAF reconnaissance had discovered in late February and early March that the PAVN had improved and extended a road, up to eight meters wide with underwater bridges, from southern Kontum Province through the Kim Son region of Bình Định where it joined interprovincial Route 3A. Branches fed the base areas in the northern Vĩnh Thạnh Valley, and heavy truck traffic was flowing into this critical area. Furthermore, a new PAVN artillery regiment, the 68th, was discovered moving guns and ammunition south toward Binh Khê through the valley. It was also about this time that fresh evidence appeared that the 3rd Division had shifted major elements into the Vĩnh Thạnh region. Fully recognizing the threat to Route 19, Niệm conferred with the Bình Định province chief on measures to secure the route and protect Pleiku-bound convoys. Niệm had had his 47th Regiment probing north into the Vĩnh Thạnh Valley since early February, and contacts were becoming frequent and sharp. Meanwhile, the PAVN increased pressure against Phù Mỹ and Phù Cát Districts along Highway 1 with attacks in the hamlets and by rocketing Phu Cat Air Base on 18 February for the first time since mid-1974. The focus of PAVN activity had clearly shifted from northern Bình Định to the passes on Route 19. General Phạm Văn Phú, commanding II Corps, was particularly concerned about the threat to his principal line of communication. On 2 March, he directed Niệm to pull the 42nd Regiment from positions along Highway 1 and to constitute a mobile reserve to be ready to reinforce the 47th Regiment in the An Khê Pass. The security of Highway 1 was turned over to Bình Định RF/PF. Despite the clear indications that the PAVN was shifting his center of gravity southward, Niệm kept fully half of the Division in the north, opposite the An Lão Valley. On 3 March, the Division command post was near Qui Nhon; the 40th Regiment was in the Phu Cu Pass on Highway 1 just south of Bồng Sơn, and holding the high ground above and east of Hoai An; the 41st Regiment was in Bồng Sơn, covering the entrance to the An Lão Valley, with one battalion north at Landing Zone English on Highway 1; the 42nd Regiment was in reserve in Phù Mỹ District, along Highway 1, while the 47th Regiment was on Route 19 with two battalions in the An Khê Pass and its 2nd Battalion pushing north in the Vĩnh Thạnh Valley. At this time the Division G-2's estimate of the PAVN 3rd Division dispositions, which later proved to be accurate in all its essential elements, held that two battalions of the 2nd Regiment and one battalion of the 141st Regiment were in the hills just north of Route 19 at the entrance of the Vĩnh Thạnh Valley; the 12th Regiment was on the high ground south of Route 19 in the An Khê Pass, about midway between An Khê and Binh Khê; one battalion of the 2nd Regiment was in the base area north of Vĩnh Thạnh; while the other two battalions of the 141st Regiment were securing the An Lão base area in northern Bình Định. These were the dispositions in Bình Định on the eve of the final offensive.

The opening guns of the PAVN Campaign 275 sounded along Route 19, the lifeline to the highlands, in the early morning or 4 March. Simultaneous attacks closed the highway from the Mang Yang Pass in Pleiku Province to Bình Định province. PAVN sappers blew Bridge 12 southeast of Binh Khê, in Bình Định and infantry struck ARVN territorials on the high ground overwatching the An Khê Pass and the RF unit at the Route 3A junction. Soon an artillery position supporting the 2nd Battalion, 47th Regiment, north of Binh Khê was overrun. While Bình Định RF/PF and the 47th Regiment struggled to hold their positions against the withering PAVN artillery, infantry, and sapper assaults, ARVN forces in Pleiku Province came under heavy rocket, mortar, and recoilless rifle fire along Route 19 from Le Trung, 15 km east of Pleiku City, to the narrow defiles of the Mang Yang Pass.

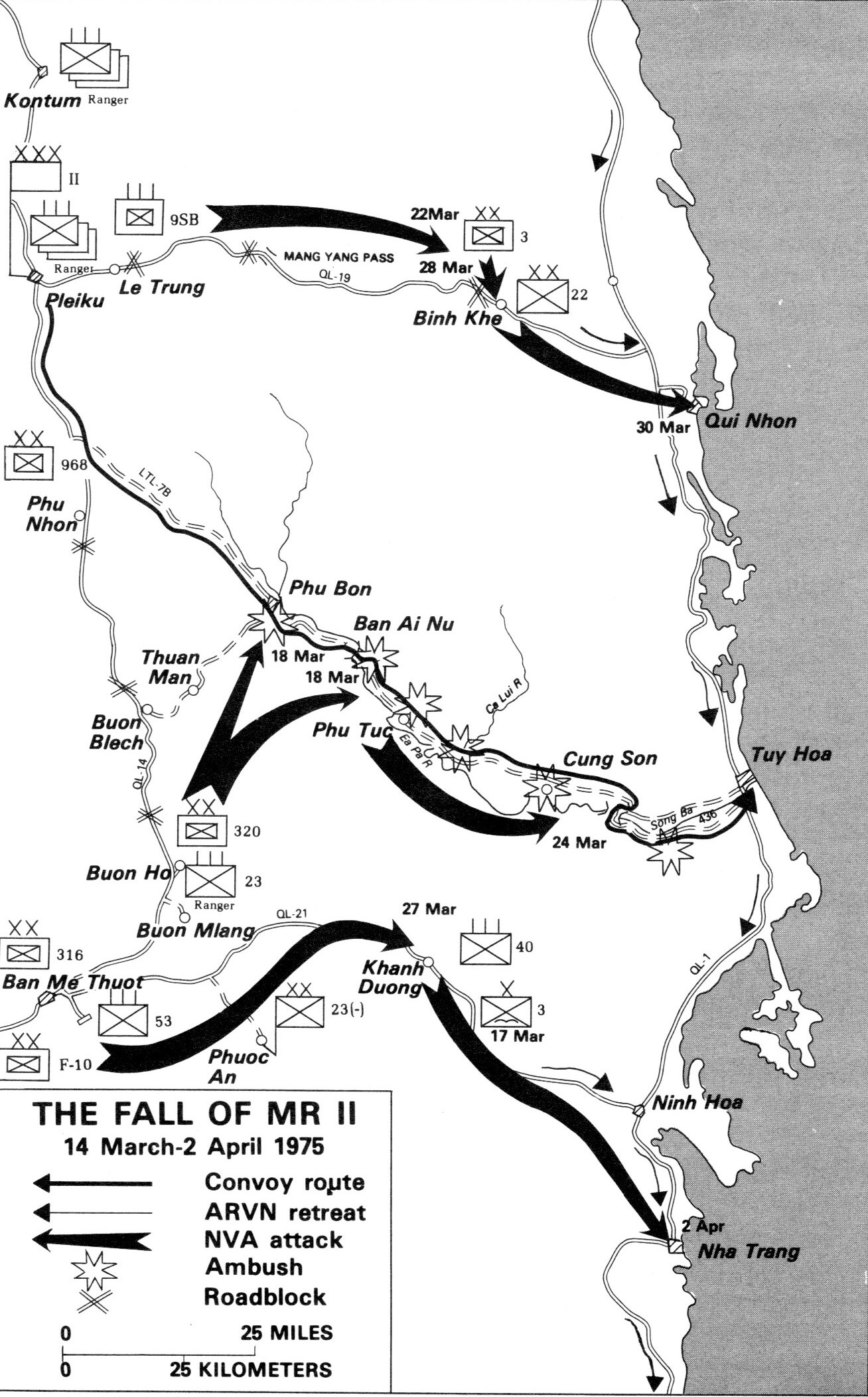
Map of the fall of II Corps with the Division's operations at top

On 8/9 March, the 41st Regiment, moved from Bồng Sơn to An Son on Highway 19, to secure the line of communication west toward Binh Khê and to protect Phu Cat Air Base.

On 10 March, Niệm reinforced his 42nd Regiment in Binh Khê District with the headquarters and two battalions of the 41st Regiment, but Route 19 was still cut at Le Trung and Binh Khê. By the time, Niệm had enough battalions in position to counterattack, the PAVN had exploited their early gains and had major elements of all three regiments of the PAVN 3rd Division - the 2nd, 12th and 141st plus sappers, artillery, and supporting local units, concentrated at the mouth of the Vĩnh Thạnh Valley between the An Khê Pass and Binh Khê. As the PAVN 320th Division attacked Buôn Ma Thuột, Niệm had three of his four regiments committed between An Nhon, where Highway 19 leaves Highway 1, and the eastern end of the An Khê Pass. The 1st and 2nd Battalions, 47th Regiment, at the eastern entrance of the An Khê Pass, fought off repeated attempts by battalions of the 2nd and 141st Regiments to drive them from the field. On 11 March the 3rd Battalion, 47th Regiment was airlifted to Binh Khê District Town, completing the deployment of this regiment. The 927th RF Group still held positions inside the pass but could not control the road. Its 209th RF Battalion was overrun on 11 March and its 218th RF Battalion, with its companies spread thinly through the pass, was extremely vulnerable. The 42nd Regiment, with its command post in Binh Khê was attacking west along Highway 19 to attempt a link-up with the two beleaguered battalions of the 47th Regiment. The 40th Regiment remained in northern Bình Định Province, holding the entrance of the An Lão Valley and guarding the Phù Cừ Pass on Route 506 north of Phù Mỹ.

By 11 March, the PAVN 1st and 2nd Battalions, 2nd Regiment had been badly hurt by ARVN artillery and RVNAF air strikes. The 7th Battalion, 141st Regiment, had been driven across the confluence of the Côn and Dong Pho Rivers with two of its companies virtually annihilated. The 3rd Battalion, 2nd Regiment and the 5th Battalion, 12th Regiment, were also hit hard, but truckloads of ammunition and replacements kept rolling down the Vĩnh Thạnh Valley and the dead and wounded made the return trip to the PAVN base areas north of Vĩnh Thạnh.

On 13 March, a representative of the US Defense Attache Office visited forward positions of the Division. His report reflected the general confidence and optimism in Niệm's command. Heavy attacks of five PAVN battalions against the 1st and 2nd Battalions, 47th Regiment, had been repulsed, though four successive commanders of the 2nd Battalion had been killed in action since 4 March. Now commanded by a captain, the battalion was down to half strength and was withdrawn to the Division base camp for refitting. Without its 2nd Battalion, the 47th Regiment was to attack the PAVN in the eastern portal of the An Khê Pass, and link up with the RF still in the pass. The 927th RF Group, under the operational control of the 47th Regiment, had its command post west of the pass at An Khê and companies of its understrength battalions, the 209th, 217th and 218th, on outposts through the pass. When the command post of the 218th RF Battalion and one of its companies were overrun on 12 March, the 47th Regiment appeared unlikely to break through to the pass in time to find any RF positions intact. The 218th reorganized, and maintained some positions at the west end of the pass, but on 17 March it was again under attack by the PAVN 5th Battalion, 12th Regiment.

On 14 March, after the fall of Buôn Ma Thuột, General Phú flew to Cam Ranh Base to meet with President Nguyễn Văn Thiệu, Prime Minister Trần Thiện Khiêm, Assistant for Security affairs Đặng Văn Quang and Head of the JGS Cao Văn Viên. Thiệu outlined his strategy for the Central Highlands, Phú's role would be to retake Buôn Ma Thuột using the troops he still had in Kontum and Pleiku Provinces and the Division. With Route 19 cut in Pleiku and Bình Định and no way to use Routes 14 and 21 through Darlac, Phú had only the rough interprovincial Route 7B available to recover his Kontum-Pleiku forces, assemble them in Khánh Hòa Province, and fight back along Route 21 into Buôn Ma Thuột. Although many hazards were discussed, this approach was accepted by Thiệu and Phú flew back to his headquarters to set the withdrawal in motion.

The fighting was intense between the eastern end of the An Khê Pass and Binh Khê during the period between 15 and 17 March. The 42nd Regiment was attempting to dislodge three battalions of the PAVN 3rd Division which were occupying the high ground near the eastern end of the An Khê Pass. Despite killing nearly 500 PAVN in two days the 42nd made no real progress. Its commander was wounded twice but remained on duty. Meanwhile, the 41st Regiment moved up to south of Binh Khê District Town. Niệm withdrew the two remaining battalions of the 47th Regiment and sent them to northern Bình Định province to relieve the 2nd and 3rd Battalions, 40th Regiment, which Phú had ordered to Khang Duong in Khánh Hòa Province. After the 2nd Battalion, 47th Regiment, finished refitting at the Division base camp, he planned to send it north to replace the 1st Battalion, 40th Regiment which would then become Division reserve. With only two regiments available and no reserve, Niệm decided on 17 March he could not open the An Khê Pass and ordered his battalions to hold in place. Although several thousand civilians and several hundred RF/PF troops at An Khê were cut off from Qui Nhơn, there was no longer any compelling military reason to pursue the attack. The exodus from the highlands was already under way along Route 7B and any ARVN counterattack to retake Buôn Ma Thuột was no longer feasible.

On 21 March, the 2nd and 3rd Battalions, 40th Regiment had been moved from Bình Định province to stop the PAVN 10th Division advancing from on Route 21. The two Battalions were deployed west of Khanh Duong to meet the advancing PAVN 10th Division and the 3rd Airborne Brigade was dug in on the high ground in the pass, behind the 40th Regiment. On 22 March, the leading battalions of the 10th Division, with tanks supporting, blasted into Khanh Duong and the two battalions of the 40th Regiment were forced to withdraw through the 3rd Airborne Brigade. The 40th was withdrawn to Dục Mỹ Camp, then sent south to eastern Diên Khánh District to prepare positions generally astride local Route 420, which led due east into Diên Khánh and on into Nha Trang in order the prevent the PAVN bypassing the Airborne. The 40th was reinforced with one RF battalion and supported by one 155 mm and two 105 mm howitzers.

On 24 March, the 42nd Regiment pulled back along Route 19, east of Binh Khê and the 41st Regiment assumed the defense of Binh Khê. That same day, the long-expected PAVN assault on Binh Khê began, and the 41st and 42nd Regiments were soon cut off. The PAVN 3rd Division then pushed its 141st and 12th Regiments (except for the 5th Battalion still at An Khê) eastward toward Phu Cat. Meanwhile, the B3 Front's 95B Regiment, having marched east from Pleiku along Route 19, joined the 2nd Regiment for the continuation of the attack on the 42nd Regiment east of Binh Khê. The 41st and 42nd Regiments did not wait for the reinforced attack. Instead, on 27 March, they broke out and attacked eastward toward Qui Nhơn, taking with them over 400 RF/PF rescued by helicopter the day before from the An Khê area. As the 41st and 42nd Regiments dug in for the defense of Qui Nhơn, orders arrived from Saigon to evacuate what remained of the Division, II Corps was virtually lost.

On 30 March, the PAVN 10th Division attacked the 3rd Airborne Brigade in the Deo Cao Pass. By 31 March, the Airborne was surrounded or in retreat. The 3rd Airborne, less than one fourth of its soldiers still in ranks marched back the beach below Hòn Son Mountain, just north of Nha Trang. On 1 April, PAVN tanks rolled through Dục Mỹ and Ninh Hòa and headed for Nha Trang. The II Corps staff drove south to Phan Rang, the remnants of the Airborne, Rangers, RF/PF, and 40th Infantry followed.

As the PAVN attacked Phu Cat Air Base on 31 March, the RVNAF flew out about 32 aircraft, leaving about 58, mostly disabled or destroyed, on the ground. On 1–2 April, about 7,000 troops of the 41st and 42nd Regiments and Bình Định RF/PF boarded Republic of Vietnam Navy craft at Qui Nhơn and sailed for Vũng Tàu. The 42nd Regiment's commander, Col. Nguyễn Hữu Thông refused to evacuate and committed suicide. In the meantime, the 47th Regiment was totally disrupted near Phu Cat District Town after being ambushed and losing half of its troops. Its commander, Col. Lê Cầu was captured on the way retreating to Qui Nhơn.

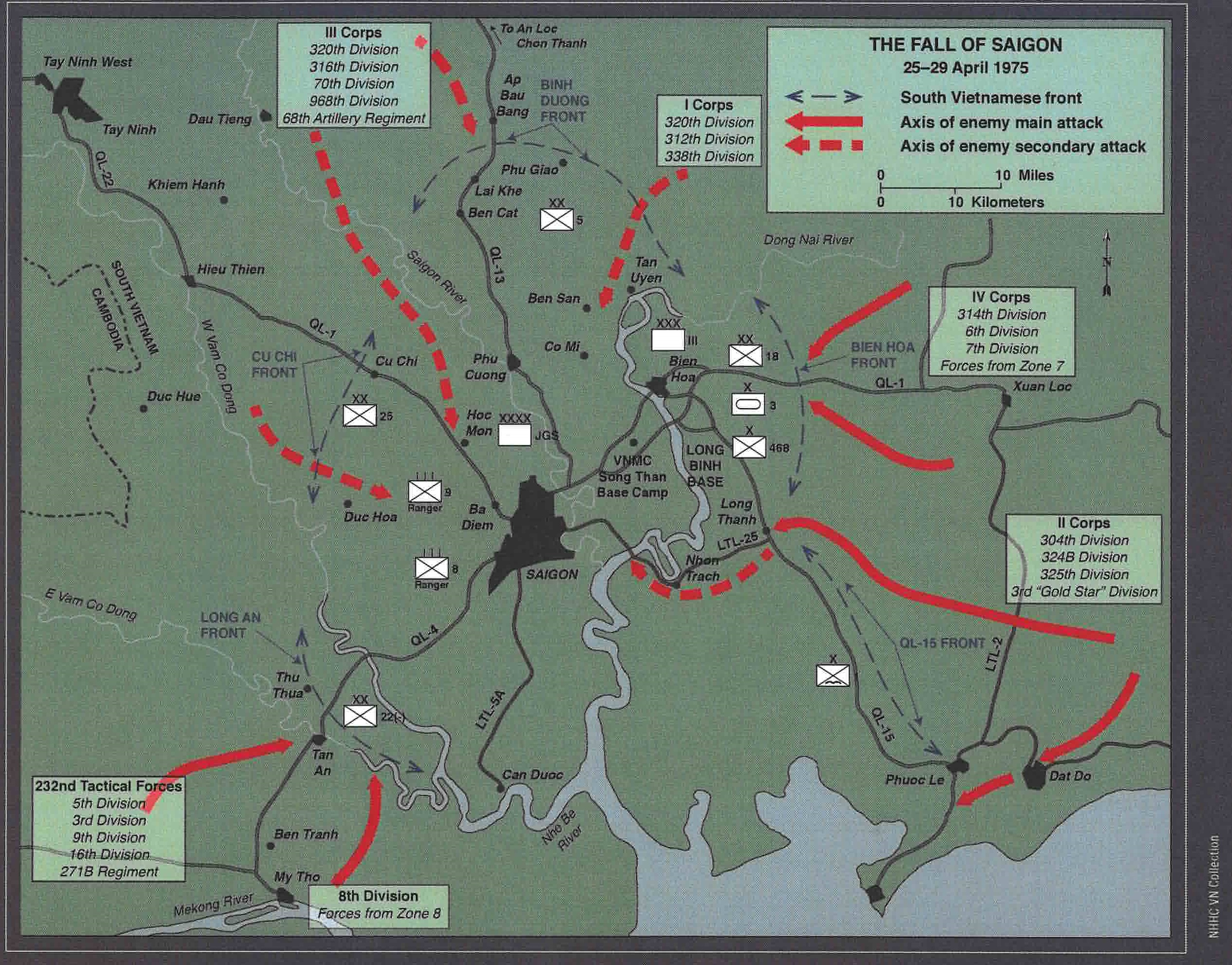
Map showing PAVN encirclement of Saigon

The Division refitted at Van Kiep National Training center at Vũng Tàu with about 4,600 men, one-third of whom were II Corps RF/PF. It was short of all categories of equipment, although it had enough artillerymen to man three battalions, it had no howitzers. Nevertheless, sparsely equipped and barely organized, it was ordered to deploy to Long An Province on 12 April. Before the Fall of Saigon, the 41st and 42nd Regiments took part in the defense of Bến Lức / Tân An and Route 4 under the Capital Military District alongside local RF/PF and the 12th Regiment of the 7th Division.

== Organisation ==
The Division comprised the following:

- Division HQ
- 40th Regiment
- 41st Regiment
- 42nd Regiment
- 47th Regiment
- 14th Armored Cavalry Squadron
- 1 Battalion of 155 mm artillery
- 3 Battalions of 105 mm artillery
- 1 Battalion of Sapper/Engineers
