= Ngô Du =

South Vietnamese general (1926–1977)

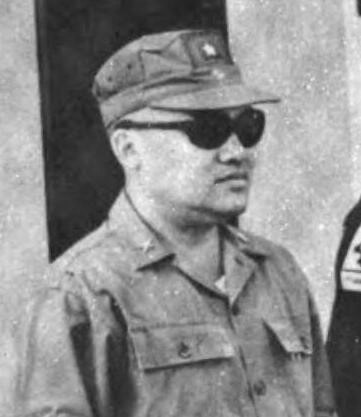
- Brigadier general Ngô Du in 1968
- Born: January 1, 1925; Qui Nhơn, Annam, French Indochina
- Died: February 14, 1977 (aged 52) Sacramento, California
- Allegiance: State of Vietnam; South Vietnam
- Branch: Army of the Republic of Vietnam
- Rank: Lieutenant general
- Commands: IV Corps; II Corps
- Conflicts: Battle of Kontum

Ngô Du (1925–1977) was a Lieutenant general in the Army of the Republic of Vietnam (ARVN).

A Catholic from Qui Nhơn and the son of a government official, he was educated at a French Catholic boys' school in Huế. He held few combat commands and had few connections with the South Vietnamese political elite. Du held low-key planning positions on the Joint General Staff until he was propelled into the role of acting commander of the IV Corps Tactical Zone upon the accidental death of Brigadier General Nguyen Viet Thanh in 1970. In August 1970 Du was promoted to command of the II Corps Tactical Zone in the Central Highlands of South Vietnam.

In June 1971 27 ARVN colonels and majors in II Corps wrote to commanders in Saigon complaining of Du's corruption. Du claimed that the charges were made by his enemies and no action was taken against him.

During July 1971 allegations were raised in the US Congress that Du was deeply involved in the drug trade. Du's senior U.S. advisor, John Paul Vann acknowledged forthrightly that Du was corrupt and that, whatever his interest in drugs, his lifestyle far exceeded his legal income. Yet he was, said Vann, so amenable to American instruction that, to maintain respect for him within the Army of the Republic of Vietnam (ARVN), his American advisers had even on occasion warned him to be more independent. On that account, said Vann, "Despite some obvious shortcomings, I would rate Ngo Dzu as second... [among] the eight corps commanders I have worked with." With Vann's rejoinder on record, the US dropped the issue and never pursued the allegations against Du.

From his headquarters at Pleiku, he and Vann commanded ARVN forces during the Battle of Kontum, part of the North Vietnamese Easter Offensive of 1972. His command abilities during the ensuing fighting, according to his American advisors, left a lot to be desired. On 10 May 1972 he was replaced as corps commander by Major General Nguyễn Văn Toàn. Commenting on his replacement Vann said "All distant critics like to see a scalp fall, it makes them feel better. I am aware of criticism by members of the National Assembly from Binhdinh and Kontum Provinces of General Dzu's handling of the situation." Commenting on Toàn, Vann said

He'll either be better or worse than General Dzu or maybe similar.

In January 1973 Du was appointed as the South Vietnamese representative to the Four-Party Joint Military Commission responsible for implementing the Paris Peace Accords. South Vietnamese government and military officials stated that Du's appointment showed President Nguyễn Văn Thiệu's disdain for the commission. On 11 February 1973 Du was abruptly replaced on the commission due to his "physical condition".

In a postwar interview with the RAND Corporation, Nguyễn Cao Kỳ said of Du: "he's a coward; he's involved in all kind of smuggling and corruption, but still many Americans, when they come to me, they say, you know, Dzu is a "number one" type."

Du escaped from Saigon in 1975. He died in California on 14 February 1977, at age 52.
