= An Lão district, Bình Định =

An Lão district Huyện An Lão
- District
- Interactive map of An Lão district
- Location of in Vietnam
- Coordinates: 14°33′N 108°48′E
- Country: Vietnam
- Region: South Central Coast
- Province: Bình Định
- Capital: An Lão

Area
  - Total: 700 km^{2} (270 sq mi)

Population (2024)
  - Total: 55,700
  - Density: 80/km^{2} (210/sq mi)
- Time zone: UTC+7 (Indochina Time)

An Lão is a district (huyện) of Bình Định province in the South Central Coast region of Vietnam. Having a population of 27,837 (2019), 24,200 (2009) and in 2003 the district had a population of 24,091. The district covers an area of 690 km^{2}. The district capital lies at An Lão.

== The Battle of An Lão ==
The Battle of An Lão occurred in December 1964, ending as a tactical victory for the Việt Cộng, by wresting temporary control of the District Headquarters from the South Vietnamese forces.
