= Đắk Tô Base Camp =

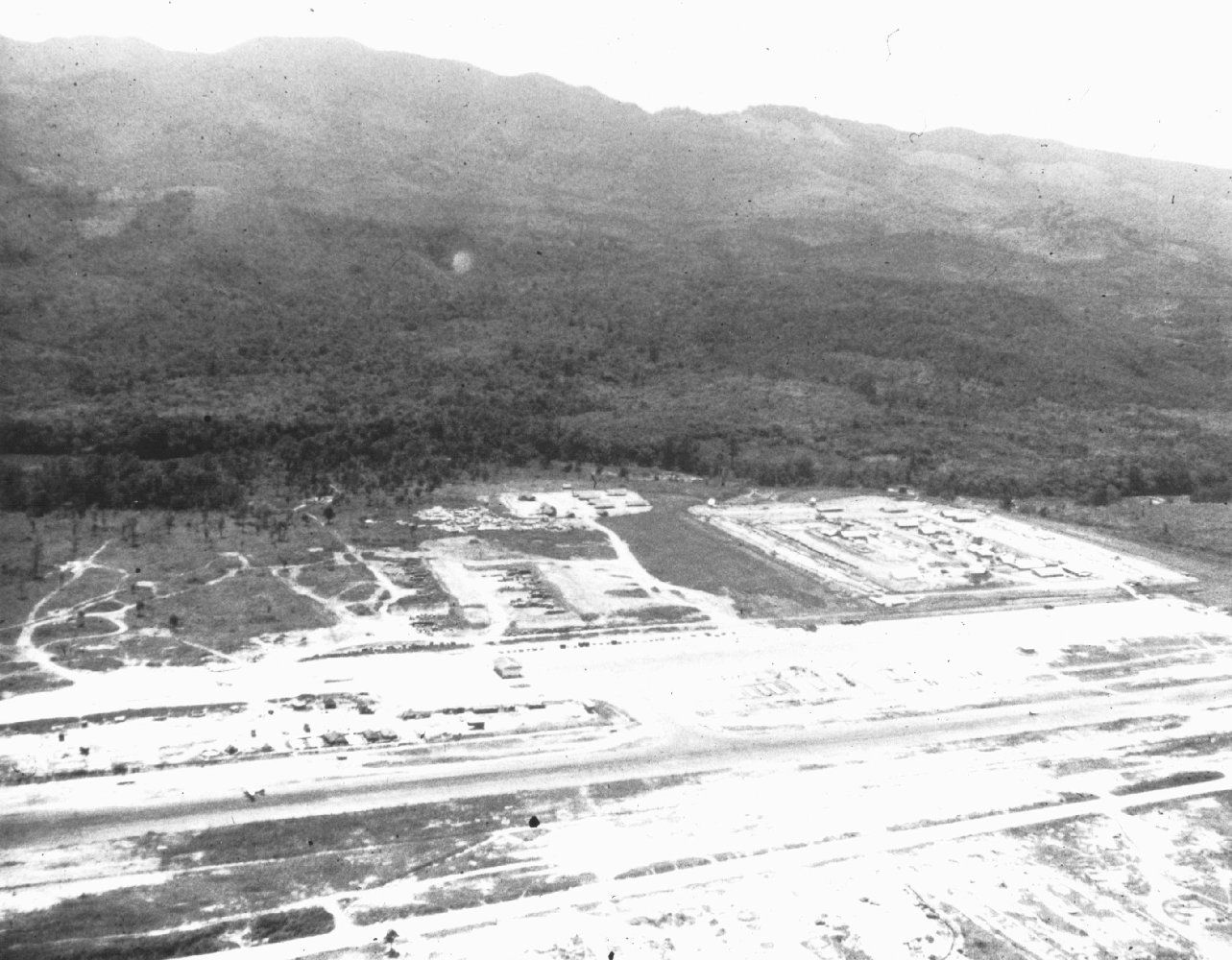
- Aerial photo of Đắk Tô Base looking toward Laos

Site information
- Type: Army Base

Location
- Coordinates: 14.653°N 107.794°E

Site history
- Built: 1967
- In use: 1967–72
- Battles/wars: Vietnam War; Battle of Dak To; Battle of Kontum

Garrison information
- Occupants: 4th Infantry Division; 173rd Airborne Brigade

Đắk Tô 2 Airfield/Phoenix Airfield
- IATA: none; ICAO: none

Summary
- Elevation AMSL: 1,975 ft (602 m)
- Interactive map of Đắk Tô 2 Airfield/Phoenix Airfield

Runways
Direction	Length		Surface
Direction	ft	m	Surface
	4,200	1,280	asphalt

Đắk Tô Base Camp (also known as Đắk Tô 2 Airfield and Phoenix Airfield) is a former U.S. Army and Army of the Republic of Vietnam (ARVN) base northwest of Kon Tum in the Central Highlands of Vietnam.

== History ==
=== 1966-7 ===
The 5th Special Forces Group Detachment A-333 first established a base at Đắk Tô in 1962 to monitor communist infiltration along the Ho Chi Minh Trail. In early-mid 1967 increased infiltration into the Central Highlands led Major General William R. Peers commander of the 4th Infantry Division to request reinforcements and the 173rd Airborne Brigade was moved by air to Đắk Tô in June 1967. As the existing Special Forces base camp and airfield were too small to accommodate large numbers of troops and their support requirements, a new airfield and base camp was established several kilometres further west, approximately 40 km northwest of Kon Tum. The former Đắk Tô camp would then be known as Tân Cảnh Base Camp.

The base would see extensive activity throughout the second half of 1967, culminating in the Battle of Dak To in November 1967. On the night of 15 November, North Vietnamese mortar fire hit two Lockheed C-130 Hercules transport aircraft (#62-1865 and #63-7827) destroying them and setting off secondary explosions and fires in the ammunition dump and fuel storage areas.

=== 1968–72 ===
The 4th Infantry Division would have its headquarters at Đắk Tô in March 1968 and its subordinate units would be based there from December 1967 until December 1968.

Other units stationed at Đắk Tô included:

- 3rd Brigade, 101st Division (June 1968) comprising:
  - 1st Battalion, 506th Infantry
  - 2nd Battalion, 506th Infantry

=== 1972–5 ===
In early 1972 the ARVN 42nd Regiment of the 22nd Division was stationed at Tân Cảnh/Đắk Tô.

On 7/8 February following intelligence showing a PAVN buildup in the area the 22nd Division forward command post, 47th Regiment and supporting units were moved from Ba Gi to the Đắk Tô/Tân Cảnh area. Elements of the 19th Cavalry Regiment were attached to the Division to support its organic 14th Cavalry Regiment equipped with M41 light tanks. The armored units would be deployed forward at Ben Het Camp which was regarded as the most likely direction of a PAVN armored attack.

Since the start of the Easter Offensive at the end of March, the string of ARVN firebases along the area known as Rocket Ridge had come under attack with two being overrun by the PAVN. During early April, the 47th Regiment supported by M41 light tanks and an Airborne Battalion withdrew to Đắk Tô II, while the 42nd Regiment and one Battalion of the 41st Regiment were at Tân Cảnh supported by armor and artillery. In addition ARVN Airborne and Rangers occupied the remaining firebases along Rocket Ridge. All the ARVN bases were subjected to heavy rocket and artillery barrages that had steadily increased over the preceding two weeks.

On 23 April, the PAVN 2nd Division started their attack on Tân Cảnh by hitting the ARVN tanks with AT-3 missiles and this was followed by a direct hit on the 42nd Regiment command bunker. At 21:00 hours a column of 18 PAVN tanks was spotted in the area, an Air Force AC-130 gunship arrived at 23:00 and began to engage the T-54 tanks with its 105mm cannon. Three T-54s were disabled but later recovered by the PAVN.

On the morning of 24 April, one hour after the main PAVN attack on Tân Cảnh commenced, the PAVN began their attack on Đắk Tô. A UH-1H helicopter #69-15715 landed to evacuate the 6 U.S. advisers who had been rescued from the Tân Cảnh perimeter, this helicopter was hit by PAVN anti-aircraft fire and crashed, 5 passengers and crew were killed in the crash while 5 survived, evaded capture and were recovered up 13 days later. The PAVN penetrated the base perimeter suffering heavy losses, the remaining U.S. advisers called in airstrikes as the morning fog cleared but by 10 am the 47th Regiment commander had lost contact with most of his subordinates and the command group evacuated the command bunker for a bunker in the inner perimeter. A T-54 moved into the base and began direct fire on the command post, the two remaining M41s engaged the T-54, however their 76mm guns had no apparent effect on the T-54 which quickly knocked out both M41s. A relief column of M41s supported by infantry arrived from Ben Het around this time, but all the M41s were knocked out by B-40 rockets and recoilless rifle fire and the infantry dispersed. With the failure of this counterattack and the loss of command and control the ARVN forces began to evacuate the base towards the south. As the ARVN attempted to cross the Dak Poko river they came under intense PAVN fire and the senior U.S. adviser LTC Robert Brownlee disappeared during this engagement. At 20:00 the 47th Regiment command group attempted to escape the base and by 04:30 on 25 April after losing several men to PAVN fire escaped the base perimeter and were recovered the following day.

On 25 April the PAVN mopped up the remaining ARVN positions around Tân Cảnh/Đắk Tô. The 22nd Division had ceased to exist as a fighting unit, the Division commander and his entire staff had disappeared and the PAVN had captured 23 105mm and 7 155mm howitzers and large supplies of ammunition and stores. With the loss of the main camps, the remaining firebases along Rocket Ridge were abandoned and the PAVN had a clear approach to Kon Tum.

== Current use ==
The base has been turned over to farmland and housing. The airfield is no longer used but is still visible on satellite images, the runway is parallel to the Ho Chi Minh Highway.
