= Tân Cảnh Base Camp =

Site information
- Type: Army Base

Location
- Coordinates: 14.661°N 107.822°E

Site history
- Built: 1962
- In use: 1962–72
- Battles/wars: Vietnam War; Battle of Dak To; Battle of Kontum

Garrison information
- Occupants: 4th Infantry Division; 173rd Airborne Brigade; 22nd Division

Đắk Tô I Airfield
- IATA: none; ICAO: none

Summary
- Elevation AMSL: 2,165 ft (660 m)

Runways
Direction	Length		Surface
Direction	ft	m	Surface
	2,300	701	dirt

Tân Cảnh Base Camp (also known as Đắk Tô 1) is a former U.S. Army and Army of the Republic of Vietnam (ARVN) base northwest of Kon Tum in the Central Highlands of Vietnam.

== History ==
=== 1962–67 ===
The 5th Special Forces Group Detachment A-333 first established a base at Đắk Tô in 1962 to monitor communist infiltration along the Ho Chi Minh Trail. In early-mid 1967 increased infiltration into the Central Highlands led Major General William R. Peers commander of the 4th Infantry Division to request reinforcements and the 173rd Airborne Brigade was moved by air to Đắk Tô in June 1967. As the existing Special Forces base camp and airfield were too small to accommodate large numbers of troops and their support requirements, a new airfield and base camp known as Đắk Tô 2 and Đắk Tô Base Camp were established several kilometres further west, approximately 40 km northwest of Kon Tum and the former camp became known as Tân Cảnh Base Camp.

=== 1972 ===
In early 1972 the ARVN 42nd Regiment of the 22nd Division was stationed at Tân Cảnh.

On 7/8 February following intelligence showing a PAVN buildup in the area the 22nd Division forward command post, 47th Regiment and supporting units were moved from Ba Gi to the Đắk Tô/Tân Cảnh area. Elements of the 19th Cavalry Regiment were attached to the Division to support its organic 14th Cavalry Regiment equipped with M-41 light tanks. The armored units would be deployed forward at Ben Het Camp which was regarded as the most likely direction of a PAVN armored attack.

Since the start of the Easter Offensive at the end of March, the base had come under increasing PAVN artillery and rocket fire, which had gone from 20–50 rounds per day in March to up to 1000 per day by mid-April. During early April, the 47th Regiment withdrew to Đắk Tô II, while the 42nd Regiment and one Battalion of the 41st Regiment were at Tân Cảnh supported by armor and artillery. In addition ARVN Airborne and Rangers occupied a string of firebases along the area known as Rocket Ridge.

On 23 April, the PAVN 2nd Division started their attack on Tân Cảnh by hitting the ARVN tanks with AT-3 missiles and this was followed by a direct hit on the 42nd Regiment command bunker injuring the senior U.S. Adviser and several of the ARVN commanders and severely undermining the confidence of COL Dat the 22nd Division commander . By midday all 5 of the M-41 tanks in the base and several more bunkers had been destroyed by the missiles. At 11:00 John Paul Vann the senior U.S. military adviser in II Corps landed to assess the situation and instructed the U.S. advisers to prepare to escape and evade from the camp. At 19:00 PAVN rocket fire ignited the base ammunition dump

At 21:00 hours a column of 18 PAVN tanks was spotted in the area, an Air Force Lockheed AC-130 gunship arrived at 23:00 and began to engage the T-54 tanks with its 105mm cannon. Three T-54s were disabled but later recovered by the PAVN. At midnight the tank column turned towards Tân Cảnh and the ARVN artillery began firing on the column until stopped by PAVN counterbattery fire. Two bridges on the approach to Tân Cảnh were abandoned without being destroyed. The ARVN organised hunter-killer teams and these destroyed two tanks.

Just before 06:00 hours on 24 April the PAVN tanks attacked Tân Cảnh in two columns. One column of T-54s attacked the main gate, the other moving to secure the airstrip. The advance of the tanks caused the 900 support troops to panic. The new command bunker was hit by further artillery fire destroying the radio antennas. With the collapse of all command and control on the base, the American advisers abandoned the command bunker and moved to a new position to call in airstrikes, however fog made such airstrikes impossible. At dawn Vann arrived over Tân Cảnh in his Bell OH-58A Kiowa and made contact with the advisers who had escaped from the base perimeter. Vann landed and 6 advisers squeezed into the helicopter while frightened ARVN troops hung onto the skids. The helicopter flew to Đắk Tô II to drop off the passengers and then flew back to Tân Cảnh where they picked up the remaining 3 advisers, however the helicopter was swarmed by panicky ARVN and crashed on takeoff. Another helicopter came in and picked up Vann, his pilot and the 3 advisers and flew them to Pleiku.

One hour after the main PAVN attack on Tân Cảnh commenced, the PAVN began their attack on Đắk Tô and by the afternoon on 24 April Đắk Tô had also been overrun.

On 25 April the PAVN mopped up the remaining ARVN positions around Tân Cảnh/Đắk Tô. The 22nd Division had ceased to exist as a fighting unit, the divisional commander and his entire staff had disappeared, and the PAVN had captured 23 105-mm and seven 155-mm howitzers, as well as large supplies of ammunition and stores. With the loss of the main camps, the remaining firebases along Rocket Ridge were abandoned and the PAVN had a clear approach to Kon Tum.

== Current use ==
The base has been turned over to farmland and housing. The airfield is no longer used but is still visible on satellite images.
