= 5th Military Region (People's Army of Vietnam) =

Military region of the People's Army of Vietnam

Coordinates: 13.5°N 108.5°E

Quân khu 5 (5th Military Region)
- Military Region emblem
- Active: 16 October 1945 – present
- Country: Vietnam
- Allegiance: People's Army of Vietnam
- Branch: Active duty
- Role: Regular force
- Size: Equivalent to Corps
- Part of: People's Army of Vietnam
- Garrison/HQ: Đà Nẵng
- Engagements: First Indochina War; Vietnam War; Cambodian–Vietnamese War
- Decorations: Gold Star Order

Commanders
- Current commander: Lieutenant General Lê Ngọc Hải
- Political commissar: Major General Lương Đình Chung

The 5th Military Region of the People's Army of Vietnam is directly administered by the Ministry of Defence of Vietnam and tasked with the organization, creation, management and oversight of armed forces in South Central Vietnam, including the Central Highlands and the South Central Coast.

== Agencies ==
- Department of Staff
  - 674th Tank Storage Battalion (T-54/T-55 tanks)
  - 32nd Reconnaissance Battalion
  - 8th Guard Battalion
  - 75th Artillery Command Battalion
  - 409th Commando Battalion
  - Unmanned Vehicle Battalion
  - 97th Electronic Warfare Battalion
  - 78th Chemical Defense Battalion (UAZ-469RKh, BRDM-2RKh, ARS-14)
  - 340th Engineer Workshop
- Department of Politics
  - Division of Organisation
  - Division of Cadre
  - Division of Policy
  - Division of Propaganda and Training
  - Division of Thoughts and Culture
  - Military Court of Military Zone
  - Military Procuratorate of Military Zone
  - Military Museum of 5th Military Zone
  - Newspaper of 5th Military Zone
  - Troupe of 5th Military Zone
- Department of Logistics - Technical
  - 655th Transportation Brigade (KamAZ-5350)
    - 3rd Transportation Battalion
    - 232nd Transportation Battalion
    - 782nd Transportation Battalion
  - 13th Military Hospital
  - 387th Motor Repair Workshop
  - K52 Warehouse
  - K54 Technical Warehouse
- 5th Military Region Military School
  - 1st Battalion
  - 2nd Battalion
  - 3rd Battalion
  - 4th Battalion
  - 5th Battalion
- Central Region Cadet Military School
- Mine Action Center

== Subordinate units ==
- Military Command of Đà Nẵng
  - Border Guard Command of Đà Nẵng
  - 30th Infantry Regiment
  - 885th Infantry Regiment
  - 971st Infantry Regiment
  - 70th Mixed Battalion (Chàm Islands defense)
    - Artillery Company (D-44 field guns)
    - Air Defense Company (61-K anti-aircraft guns)
    - 10K5-1 Observation Post
  - 699th Tank Battalion (PT-76, BTR-152, M113 ACAV)
  - Mechanized Reconnaissance Company (BTR-152, BRDM-2)
  - K97 Warehouse
- Military Command of Quảng Ngãi Province
  - Border Guard Command of Quảng Ngãi
  - 31st Infantry Regiment
  - 32nd Infantry Regiment
  - 887th Infantry Regiment
  - 990th Infantry Regiment
  - Lý Sơn Mixed Battalion
  - 2 Mechanized Reconnaissance Companies (BTR-152)
  - Engineer Company
  - Signals Company
  - Storage Company
  - K53 Unit (body recovery unit)
- Military Command of Khánh Hòa Province
  - Border Guard Command of Khánh Hòa
  - 33rd Infantry Regiment
  - 896th Infantry Regiment
  - 974th Infantry Regiment
  - 90th Mixed Company (Hòn Tre Island Defense)
  - 2 Mechanized Reconnaissance Companies (BTR-152)
  - 18th Signals Company
  - 19th Engineer Company
  - Storage Company
- Military Command of Gia Lai Province
  - Border Guard Command of Gia Lai
  - 34th Infantry Regiment
  - 35th Infantry Regiment
  - 739th Infantry Regiment
  - 991st Infantry Regiment
  - Cù Lao Xanh Island Mixed Company
  - 2 Mechanized Reconnaissance Companies (BTR-152)
  - Signals Company
  - Engineer Company
  - Storage Company
  - K52 Unit (body recovery unit)
- Military Command of Đắk Lắk Province
  - Border Guard Command of Đắk Lắk
  - 36th Infantry Regiment
  - 37th Infantry Regiment
  - 584th Infantry Regiment
  - 888th Infantry Regiment
  - 2 Mechanized Reconnaissance Companies (BTR-152, BRDM-2)
  - 18th Signal Company
  - K51 Unit (body recovery unit)
- 2nd Division
  - 1st Infantry Regiment "Ba Gia Unit"
  - 38th Infantry Regiment "Gio An Unit" (named as 90th Regiment during Vietnam War)
  - 95th Infantry Regiment "Mang Yang Unit"
  - 100mm Mortar Battalion
  - 16th Air Defense Battalion
  - 18th Signals Battalion
  - 20th Reconnaissance Company
  - 17th Engineer Battalion
  - 25th Transportation Battalion
- 305th Division
  - 108th Infantry Regiment
  - 210th Infantry Regiment
  - 803rd Infantry Regiment
- 307th Division
  - 29th Infantry Regiment
  - 93rd Infantry Regiment
  - 94th Infantry Regiment
  - 18th Signals Battalion
  - 24th Medical Battalion
  - 29th Equipment Storage Company
- 315th Division
  - 142nd Infantry Regiment
  - 143rd Infantry Regiment
  - 733rd Infantry Regiment
- 574th Tank Brigade
  - 1st Tank Battalion (T-54/55)
  - 2nd Tank Battalion (T-54/55)
  - 3rd Armored Battalion (M113 ACAV)
- 368th Artillery Brigade
  - 10th Artillery Battalion (M101 howitzers)
  - 11th Artillery Battalion (BM-14-17M MLRS)
  - 23rd Command Company
- 572nd Artillery Brigade
  - 1st Artillery Battalion (M-46 field gun, D-20 howitzer)
  - 2nd Artillery Battalion (D-20 howitzer)
  - 3rd Artillery Battalion (BM-14-17M MLRS)
  - Command Company
- 573rd Air Defense Brigade
  - 1st Air Defense Battalion (AZP S-60)
  - 2nd Air Defense Battalion (Strela-2)
  - 3rd Air Defense Battalion (Type 65 anti-aircraft guns)
  - 4th Air Defense Battalion (Training)
- 575th Signals Brigade
  - 1st Signals Battalion (radio communication and mail)
  - 2nd Signals Battalion (wired communication)
  - 3nd Signals Battalion (specialized signal vehicle & SATCOM)
- 270th Engineer Brigade
  - 1st Engineer Battalion (Structural)
  - 2nd Engineer Battalion (Structural)
  - 3rd Engineer Battalion (Structural)
  - 4th River Crossing Battalion (PMP floating bridge, VSN-1500 pontoon bridge)
  - Signals Platoon
  - Guard Platoon
  - Engineer Reconnaissance Platoon
  - Brigade Clinic
  - Transportation Platoon
  - Repair Station
- 280th Engineer Brigade
  - 1st Engineer Battalion (Structural)
  - 2nd Engineer Battalion
  - 28th Engineer Battalion
  - 471st Engineer Battalion
- 207th Economic - Defense Group
- 516th Economic - Defense Group
- 737th Economic - Defense Group
- 2nd National Military Training Center
- 5th Military Region Detention Camp

=== Independent units ===
- 380th Missile Brigade of Artillery - Missile Command (SS-1C Scud-B) (Đắk Lắk Province)
- 675th Artillery Brigade of Artillery - Missile Command (Gia Lai Province)
  - 1st Artillery Battalion (D-20 howitzer)
  - 3rd Artillery Battalion
  - 4th Artillery Battalion
  - Command Company
- 74th Special Reconnaissance Brigade of General Department of Defence Intelligence (Đà Nẵng)
- 5th Commando Brigade of Special Forces Arms (Khánh Hòa Province)
- 198th Commando Brigade of Special Forces Arms (Đắk Lắk Province)
- 132nd Signals Brigade of Signals Arms (Gia Lai Province)
  - 1st Signals Battalion
  - 2nd Signals Battalion
  - 15th Signals Battalion
  - 86th Signals Battalion
- 88th Chemical Defense Brigade of Chemical Arms (Đà Nẵng)
  - 904th Chemical Defense Battalion
  - 905th Chemical Defense Battalion
  - 906th Chemical Defense Battalion
  - 67th Center (CBRN Response Unit)
- 15th Army Corps (Economic - Defense corps) (Gia Lai Province)
  - 79th Economic - Defense Group (Quảng Trị Province)
  - 385th Economic - Defense Group (Attapeu Province, Laos)
  - 715th Economic - Defense Group
  - 716th Economic - Defense Group (Quảng Ngãi Province)
  - 717th Economic - Defense Group
  - 732nd Economic - Defense Group (Quảng Ngãi Province)
- 16th Army Corps (Economic - Defense corps) (HQ: Đồng Nai)
  - 728th Economic - Defense Group (Đắk Lắk Province)

== Successive Commander and Leadership ==
=== Commanders ===
- Lieutenant General Hoàng Văn Thái (1966–1967), later promoted to full general in 1980.
- Major General Chu Huy Mân (1967–1976): General (1980), Director of the General Political Department Vietnam People's Army (1977–1986).
- Major General Đoàn Khuê (1977–1980): Lieutenant General (1980), Colonel General (1984), General (1990), Minister of Ministry of Defence of Vietnam (1991–1997)
- Lieutenant General Nguyễn Huy Chương
- Lieutenant General Nguyễn Chơn (-1994)
- Lieutenant General Phan Hoan -(-1994)
- Lieutenant General Nguyễn Văn Được (- 2002): Deputy Minister of Ministry of Defence of Vietnam
- Lieutenant General Nguyễn Khắc Nghiên (2002–2005): then promoted to First Deputy Minister of Defence of Vietnam, Chief of General Staff of the Vietnam People's Army.
- Lieutenant General Huỳnh Ngọc Sơn (- 9/2007): Vice-Chairman of National Assembly of Vietnam XII.
- Lieutenant General Nguyễn Trung Thu (9/2007-2010)
- Lieutenant General Lê Chiêm (2011-4/2015)
- Major General Nguyễn Long Cáng (4/2015-10/2020) Lieutenant General (9/2015)
- Lieutenant General Thái Đại Ngọc (10/2020–01/2025)
- Major General Lê Ngọc Hải (01/2025–present)

=== Political Commissar ===
- Lieutenant General Hoàng Văn Thái (1966–1967)
- Colonel General Chu Huy Mân (1975–1976)
- Colonel General Đoàn Khuê (1977–1980)
- Lieutenant General Nguyễn Huy Chương
- Lieutenant General Tiêu Văn Mẫn
- Lieutenant General Nguyễn Thành Út
- Major General Nguyễn Văn Thảng, Lieutenant General (2007)
- Major General Nguyễn Thành Đức (2007–2011), Lieutenant General (2009)
- Major General Trần Quang Phương (2011–2019), Lieutenant General (9/2015)
- Lieutenant General Trịnh Đình Thạch (2019–2025)
- Senior Colonel Lương Đình Chung (2025–present)
