= Battle of the Slopes =

1967 engagement in the Vietnam War

- Part of Operation Greeley and Vietnam War
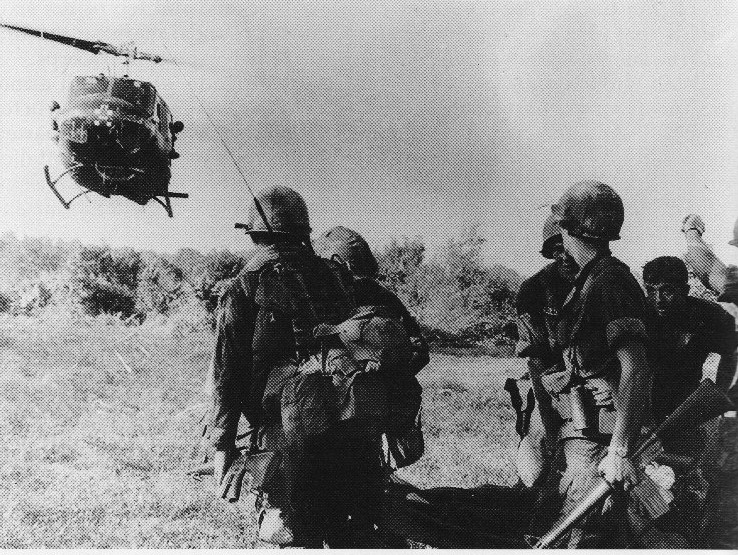
- Troops of the 173rd Airborne Brigade during Operation Greeley
Date	20–22 June 1967
Location	Hill 1338, Kontum Province, Republic of Vietnam
Result	PAVN victory

Belligerents
United States	North Vietnam

Commanders and leaders
John R. Deane Jr. Edward A. Partain; Frederick J. Milton	Unknown

Units involved
Companies A & C, 2nd Battalion, 503rd Infantry	6th Battalion, 24th Regiment

Casualties and losses
79 killed	106–475 estimated killed, but only 10–18 bodies found

The Battle of the Slopes was the site of an engagement between elements of the United States (US) 173rd Airborne Brigade (Separate), nicknamed "Westmoreland's Fire Brigade" and People's Army of Vietnam (PAVN) B3 Front units, as part of Operation Greeley in the Central Highlands of Vietnam.

== Prelude ==
In May 1965, the 173rd Airborne Brigade (Separate) was the first major US Army formation deployed to Vietnam, and was intended as an elite, rapid-reaction force meant to counter PAVN infiltration into the Central Highlands.

The battle occurred around Đắk Tô Base Camp, part of Military Assistance Command, Vietnam – Studies and Observations Group (MACV-SOG) operations intended to surveillance and gather intelligence on the Ho Chi Minh Trail on supplies flowing into South Vietnam. In 1967 mortar units begun shelling the Dak To Base Camp, intending to draw US forces to assault PAVN positions within the Central Highlands. Western Kon Tum was covered by double and triple-canopy rainforests, and the only open areas were filled in by bamboo groves whose stalks sometimes reached eight inches in diameter.

On 20 June, Company C, 2nd Battalion, 503rd Infantry Regiment discovered the bodies of a Special Forces CIDG unit that had been missing for four days on Hill 1338 (14.6°N 107.776°E), the dominant hill mass south of Dak To. With mortar fire and ambushes ongoing around the Dak To base camp, the 173rd Airborne Brigade, a highly-mobile team intended to rapidly deploy across the Central Highlands, was quickly alerted to respond.

== Battle ==
Two companies of the 2nd Battalion were airlifted onto a steep hill near Hill 1338 on 16 June. The two companies had set up camp for the night, intending to assault the top of the hill later in the day. During this time, a scout sent out on night reconnaissance was shot and killed, while one US sentry accidentally killed a GI who had momentarily stepped out of the perimeter to relieve himself.

At 06:58 on 22 June, Company A commanded by Captain David J. Milton began gradually moving up a ridge finger. The lead squad from Company A opened fire on several PAVN squads before withdrawing up the ridge to their parent platoon. The battalion commander Lt. Col. Edward A. Partain then ordered the company to reestablish contact and engage the PAVN. Before the company could react, the lead platoon was hit by fire along its front and both flanks by a platoon-sized group of the PAVN 6th Battalion, 24th Regiment. Company A immediately radioed for aerial and artillery support, radioing that "be advised that these people [the North Vietnamese] all got black berets on, they got AK-47s, every one of them, and they got so damn much ammunition." Milton sent another platoon forward to reinforce the lead platoon forcing a hold on artillery fire. Air strikes and helicopter gunship support were largely ineffective due to the thick jungle canopy.

At 08:10 a platoon-strength PAVN attack hit the two US platoons, followed 40 minutes later by a larger attack. Milton tried to move up the rest of his company and clear a landing zone at the same time. Only the 1st Platoon made it through. The other platoon was forced back to Milton's position, leaving the Company divided into two pockets.

Meanwhile, Partain had ordered one of his other companies located about 1.5 km south of the fire fight to assist Milton. He also prepared to air-assault another unit, then in reserve at Dak To, into a one-ship landing zone approximately 800 m north of the besieged platoons. Back at Dak To, General John R. Deane Jr. began putting together another reserve force consisting of the 1st Battalion, 503rd Infantry, then fully committed east of Highway 14. Before any of these forces could arrive, however the PAVN launched an all-out assault. Already, all three platoon leaders of the trapped US element had been killed and all of the platoon sergeants critically wounded; judging the situation hopeless, the senior surviving noncommissioned officer ordered the few able-bodied men and those less seriously wounded to make their way up the ridge to Milton's position. Only a few survivors reached the Company A command post.

Around noon, the PAVN, continuing up the ridgeline, hit Milton's position, then held by some 30 men forming a perimeter around 35 wounded. Company C was ordered to move in to reinforce Company A, however, PAVN forces later redeployed and entrenched alongside both sides of Company C's position while the heavy vegetation and difficult terrain made movement extremely difficult. Artillery support was continually rendered ineffective, while US forces failed to spot enemy positions. It was not until midafternoon, with the arrival of reinforcements, that the PAVN finally withdrew. Intermittent sniper fire continued into the late evening, when the Americans were able to clear a landing zone to evacuate the surviving members of Company A. A roll call at Dak To that night counted 75 men missing.

On 23 June, US forces searched the battlefield finding the missing American soldiers. Only four were still alive, and over half of the dead had head wounds inflicted at close range, indicating that the PAVN had systematically executed the wounded. Company A's losses totalled 79 dead and 23 wounded.

== Aftermath ==
Initial actions at Dak To intending to lure US forces to deploy and attack PAVN positions were a hallmark of PAVN strategy. Similar to the Plei Me campaign, initial mortaring and skirmishing actions were conducted by the PAVN to lure in a bigger US attack or rapid reaction force, with a subsequent ambush conducted to destroy the attacking US forces. Following further deployment of larger US forces for reinforcement, PAVN forces would melt away.

Regarded as a more elite, rapid-reaction force, the 173rd Airborne Brigade had lost an entire company to a well-placed ambush by a platoon-sized PAVN force. Lack of overwhelming aerial support, artillery support and firepower had rendered these two forces more or less on equal footing, with the advantage shifting to PAVN entrenchment and small-unit tactics.

A search for PAVN dead, made after the battle to justify the number of US soldiers that had been killed, was a disappointment; the search revealed just 9 to 10 PAVN dead in shallow graves. General William Westmoreland later inflated this number to 475 PAVN dead, declaring "too late it's already been sent out" when questioned about the authenticity of the number. The battle was reported to Saigon press agencies as a victory, due to the secondary number being used. The official US Army history states that 18 PAVN bodies were located, and that a total of 106 PAVN were killed and 45 weapons captured.

This engagement was part of a spike in PAVN activity intended to draw US forces into the Central Highlands, with another battle, the Battle of Dak To resulting a few months later. These two battles exacted a heavy toll on the 173rd Airborne Brigade, which was rendered combat-ineffective and withdrawn from combat.
