= Operation MacArthur =

Part of the Vietnam War (1967–1969)

- Part of the Vietnam War
| Date | 12 October 1967 – 31 January 1969 (1 year, 3 months, 2 weeks and 5 days) |
| Location | western II Corps, South Vietnam |

Belligerents
| United States; South Vietnam | North Vietnam; Viet Cong |

Commanders and leaders
| MG William R. Peers; MG Charles P. Stone; MG Donn R. Pepke | Hoàng Minh Thảo; Nguyễn Hữu An; Chu Phuong Doi |

Units involved
| (United States) 4th Infantry Division (United States) 173rd Airborne Brigade | 1st Division; 325C Division |

Casualties and losses
| (United States) 955 killed | 5,731 killed 1,299 individual and 194 crew-served |

Operation MacArthur (later renamed Operation Binh Tay–MacArthur) was a United States Army military operation in the Central Highlands of South Vietnam from 12 October 1967 to 31 January 1969. The early phases of the operation encompassed the Battle of Dak To from 3 to 23 November 1967.

== Background ==
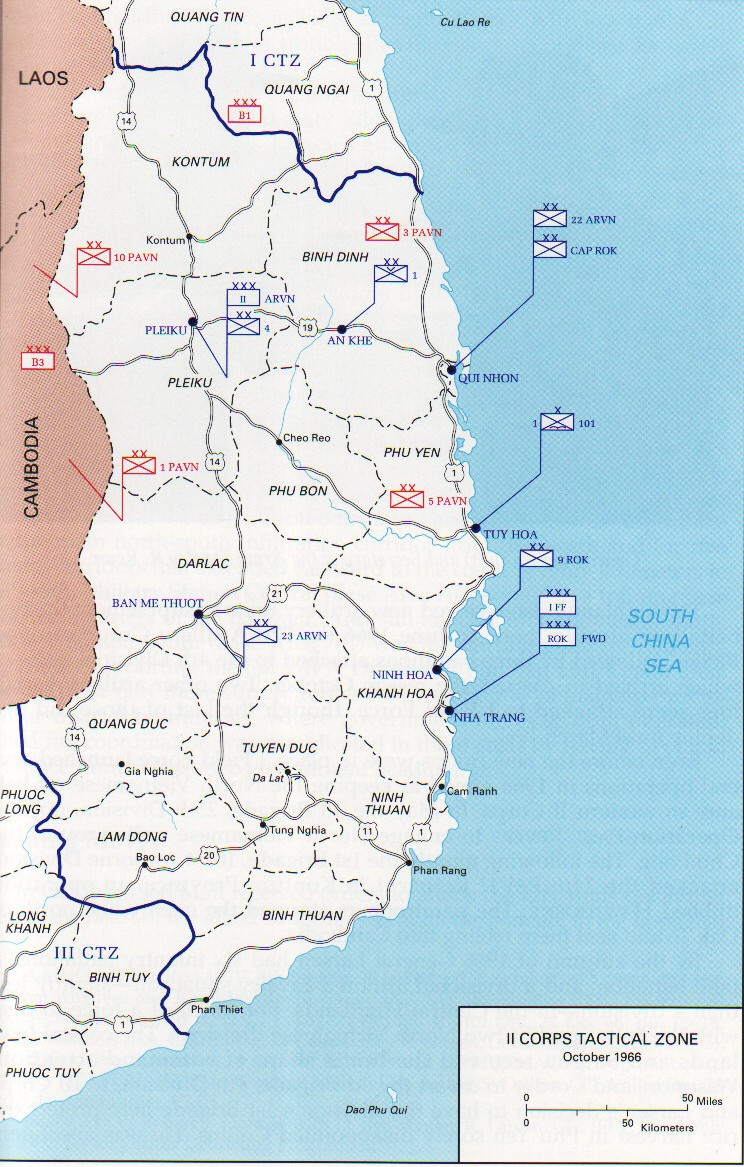
II Corps Tactical Zone, Central Highlands, South Vietnam

The U.S. 4th Infantry Division was responsible for the defense of the provincial and district capitals that lay along Highway 14, a paved road that ran from north to south through the middle of the Central Highlands.

Opposing the 4th Infantry Division was PAVN General Hoàng Minh Thảo’s B3 Front, a headquarters that controlled all the main force units in the South Vietnamese provinces of Kontum, Pleiku and Darlac, as well as the western portions of Bình Định and Phú Bổn Provinces. Thảo’s main combat force, the 1st Division, contained three strong regiments, the 32nd, the 66th, and the 174th, and was commanded by a veteran officer, Colonel Nguyễn Hữu An. The B3 Front commander also controlled three independent regiments, the 24th Regiment based in Kontum Province, the 95B Regiment in Pleiku Province and the 33rd Regiment in Darlac Province. Thảo’s long-range striking power came from the 40th PAVN Artillery Regiment, armed with 122 mm rockets, 120 mm mortars, and 75 mm recoilless rifles. The enemy received his supplies and replacements from several large bases on the Cambodian border, which lay at the southern end of the Ho Chi Minh Trail.

As October 1967 drew to a close, I Field Force, Vietnam (I FFV) commander General William B. Rosson’s most pressing concern in the Central Highlands was the ominous sign of an offensive buildup by elements of the B3 Front. Rosson believed that the most likely targets were the Civilian Irregular Defense Group program (CIDG) camps and other installations in western Kontum and Pleiku Provinces that were within easy reach of the enemy’s Cambodian base and Đắk Tô was at the top of the list.

== Operation ==
=== October–December ===
The initial phases of the operation became the Battle of Dak To from 3 to 23 November 1967.

=== January 1968 ===
On 15 January a PAVN/VC force ambushed a 40 vehicle convoy 40 km west of An Khê using three command-detonated mines, small arms and Rocket-propelled grenades (RPGs), Division reaction force and convoy security elements broke up the attack killing 13 PAVN/VC. For his actions in this battle Specialist Five Dwight H. Johnson would be awarded the Medal of Honor. On 20 January two companies from the 1st Brigade received 75 mm recoilless rifle fire 15 km west of Đắk Tô and returned fire supported by artillery and helicopter gunships killing 23 PAVN/VC. On 23 January a unit of the 2nd Brigade found a weapons cache 17 km west of Pleiku containing one individual and two crew-served weapons, 25 mines and three RPG-2 grenades. On 26 January at 09:30 a unit of the 1st Brigade engaged an enemy force 17 km northwest of Đắk Tô supported by artillery, helicopter gunships and airstrikes killing 14 PAVN/VC; U.S. losses were four killed.

Cumulative operational results to the end of January were 1,703 PAVN/VC killed and 376 individual and 106 crew-served weapons captured. U.S. losses were 359 killed.

=== February ===
On 13 February a Division company supported by artillery and helicopter gunships engaged an enemy platoon 15 km northwest of Đắk Tô, the enemy withdrew at 13:00 leaving 12 dead. On 23 February a unit of the Division’s air cavalry squadron supported by helicopter gunships engaged two enemy companies killing 23. On 25 February helicopter gunships attacked ten PAVN/VC, killing all ten. On 26 February at 08:45 as a Division unit was being air-assaulted into a landing zone 19 km west-northwest of Đắk Tô they came under fire and one helicopter made an emergency landing. The other helicopters diverted to an alternative landing zone and linked up with the downed helicopter at 12:15. PAVN/VC losses were 21 killed while U.S. losses were one killed. On 27 February at 08:00 a unit of the 25th Infantry Division in a night defensive position were hot by mortar fire followed by a ground assault. The unit returned fire supported by artillery, helicopter gunships and airstrikes and the enemy withdrew at 19:30 leaving 69 dead.

Cumulative operational results to the end of February were 2,806 PAVN/VC killed and 578 individual and 129 crew-served weapons captured. U.S. losses were 463 killed.

=== March ===
The new Division commander Major General Charles P. Stone used reconnaissance patrols from the Division and CIDG teams to watch the dozens of trails that led into Laos and Cambodia supported by scout planes and helicopters. An enemy force discovered by any of those means would face a gauntlet of air and artillery strikes and then a swarm of helicopter-backed infantry if they came within striking distance of one of the few towns that dotted the highlands. General Stone felt he could afford to let the enemy come to him because, as he put it, "I have everything the enemy wants and he has nothing I want."

In early March, U.S. forces were distributed evenly across Kontum, Pleiku and Darlac Provinces. The 1st and 2nd Battalions of the 503rd Infantry Regiment, 173rd Airborne Brigade, were looking for the 33rd Regiment near Ban Me Thuot, although it now appeared that the enemy had retreated far to the southwest to rest and refit. The 2nd Brigade guarded Pleiku Province, aware that the 32nd Regiment had recently moved somewhere southwest of the provincial capital. The 1st Brigade had an even greater responsibility in Kontum Province, for it had to monitor the 24th Regiment that was somewhere north of Kontum city as well as the 66th and 174th Regiments that were in the Đắk Tô area. While Stone and the new I FFV commander General Peers doubted the B3 Front would initiate another major offensive in the next few months—partly because of its Tet Offensive losses and partly because of the seasonal onset of the rains of the southwest monsoon—they expected the enemy to seek small gains whenever he could.

After Tet, the commander of the B3 Front, General Thảo, decided to shift his main focus away from Đắk Tô. While he would continue to threaten the allied bases there, he believed the thickening defenses between Ben Het Camp and Tân Cảnh Base Camp had substantially reduced his chances for success. By contrast, areas to the south were less well protected and thus offered a greater opportunity to pick off an isolated base or to ambush an unwary unit. The CIDG camps at Plei Kleng, 22 km west of Kontum and Plei Mrong, 30 km southwest of the capital, were especially enticing targets because they were lightly defended with little or no road access to the main allied bases. All the while, Thảo would continue to restock his forward supply areas and to integrate replacements coming down the Ho Chi Minh Trail in anticipation of the next major phase of the 1968 general offensive.

The allies learned more about Thảo’s intentions on 1 March when the commander of the 9th Battalion, 66th Regiment, Vu Nhu Y, turned himself in and spoke at length to allied interrogators. He explained that the post-Tet mission of the 1st Division was to draw allied units into the region in order to create opportunities for PAVN/VC units elsewhere in the country. The division and elements of the 40th Artillery Regiment would continue to harass Ben Het and Đắk Tô with indirect fire, while the 66th Regiment looked for opportunities to assault outposts. The same was true for the 174th Regiment. The North Vietnamese officer admitted that the 1st Division still had not fully recovered from the Đắk Tô campaign, even though it had recently obtained a fresh regiment, the 320th, to replace the battered 32nd, which had moved south to Darlac Province to operate under front control with the 33rd Regiment. The 320th Regiment, formerly the 209th Regiment, 312th Division, had just arrived from North Vietnam and was near full strength. Thảo could also reinforce an attack along Route 512 with the independent 24th Regiment if the need arose.

On 3 March at 18:00 a Division unit was attacked by fire 28 km northwest of Pleiku and returned fire supported by helicopter gunships killing 15 PAVN/VC. On 4 March at 16:00 a unit of the 3rd Brigade searching a village 15 km southeast of Pleiku engaged 40–50 VC. The unit was supported by helicopter gunships and airstrikes and the VC withdrew after three hours leaving 30 dead. On 8 March at 09:25 the 7th Squadron, 17th Cavalry Regiment engaged an enemy force 25 km south of Đắk Tô, two more troops joined the battle at 15:00 and the enemy withdrew at 19:00 leaving 14 dead; U.S. losses were one killed. On 16 March at 10:30, a unit of the 173rd Airborne engaged an enemy force 18 km north-northwest of Kontum. The enemy withdrew at 12:40, but was reengaged at 15:30 until the enemy withdrew at nightfall leaving 50 dead; U.S. losses were one killed. On 17 March at 17:10 a unit of the 173rd Airborne in a night defensive position 19 km northwest of Kontum received fire and the unit returned fire supported by artillery forcing the enemy to withdraw.

On 26 March two battalions of the 320th Regiment attacked Firebase 14 (14.378°N 107.725°E). Companies A and B of the 3rd Battalion, 8th Infantry Regiment, had established the outpost a few days earlier to protect the Polei Kleng Camp 12 km to the east. Employing flamethrowers in addition to automatic weapons and RPG-2s, the PAVN penetrated the northwest perimeter and briefly occupied a few bunkers until driven off by a U.S. counterattack. 135 PAVN and 19 U.S. were killed in the fighting. On 30 March, the 173rd Airborne flew to Bình Định Province to swap places with the 3rd Brigade, 4th Infantry Division, bringing all three brigades of the Division together for the first time in the war.

=== April ===
Beginning on 1 April and continuing for eight days, PAVN gunners fired some 400 mortar and recoilless rifle rounds into Firebase 14, which the 3/8th Infantry, had relinquished to the 1st Battalion, 35th Infantry Regiment. On 5 April, Companies A, B and C from the 35th Infantry Regiment encountered a battalion from the PAVN 320th Regiment west of the base and killed 48 PAVN before they broke contact; U.S. losses were one killed. On 9 April a unit of the 3rd Brigade found a weapons cache 13 miles (21 km) northwest of Kontum containing 14 individual weapons, five M72 LAWs, one 60 mm mortar and 65 60 mm mortar rounds and 3,000 rounds of small arms ammunition. On 15 April at 13:00 Company C, 1/35th Infantry was attacked by fire west of Firebase 14, the unit returned fire and was supported by artillery and airstrikes and reinforced by a unit of the 1st Brigade. The enemy withdrew leaving 12 dead; U.S. losses were nine killed.

The sudden spike in activity around Firebase 14 came into clearer focus on 20 April. A pair of PAVN deserters told their interrogators that the B3 Front was trying to strengthen its infiltration and supply routes that led from the tri-border area to the central plateau where the major cities were located. Stone responded to this report by establishing a second outpost a short distance to the west of Firebase 14 manned by elements of the 1st Battalion, 14th Infantry Regiment and the 1st Battalion, 22nd Infantry Regiment. Like Firebase 14, it was situated on a key piece of terrain that overlooked the surrounding area.

On 25 April at 08:00 a unit of the 2nd Brigade patrolling 22 miles (35 km) south-southwest of Đắk Tô killed two enemy snipers in trees, at 09:05 the unit was hit by mortar fire followed by small arms. The unit was reinforced by helicopter gunships and airstrikes which caused two secondary explosions. The enemy withdrew at 15:20 leaving eight dead; U.S. losses were two killed. On 27 April at 08:40 a 2nd Brigade patrol was attacked 25 miles (40 km) west of Kontum. An hour later another unit engaged an enemy bunkers complex in the area and contact continued until nightfall when the enemy withdrew leaving nine dead; U.S. losses were nine killed. On 28 April at 09:40 a Division unit engaged an entrenched enemy force 25 miles (40 km) west of Kontum, the unit withdrew and artillery and airstrikes were directed onto the bunkers, the unit continued to receive mortar fire until 19:05; U.S. losses were five killed. On 29 April the PAVN sent a battalion to attack the new firebase on 29 April, but the defenders, Company B of the 1/14th Infantry, turned back the assault and killed 46 PAVN; U.S. losses were two killed. As long as Stone controlled the high ground west of Kontum, the PAVN/VC would find it difficult to mass his forces to attack the provincial capital.

During April the PAVN 325C Division commanded by, Senior Colonel Chu Phuong Doi, minus its 29th Regiment, which it had left behind in northern Quảng Trị Province, arrived in Kontum province. Scout helicopters from the 7/17th Cavalry, noticed a rise in enemy activity around Dak To in early April as the 95C and the 101D Regiments moved into the area. In the meantime, the PAVN 1st Division shifted south toward the Kontum-Pleiku border where it was better positioned to threaten the respective provincial capitals.

Cumulative operational results to the end of April were 4,162 PAVN/VC killed and 845 individual and 135 crew-served weapons captured. U.S. losses were 601 killed.

=== May ===
On 2 May a helicopter from the 10th Cavalry Squadron landed to detain an enemy soldier 17 miles (27 km) east-southeast of Pleiku, on landing the helicopter was fired on and left the area and the aerorifle platoon was landed in the area and engaged 15 PAVN/VC in bunkers. The enemy withdrew at 15:40 leaving 12 dead; U.S. losses were one killed. On 5 May forces from the PAVN 174th Regiment ambushed a convoy on Highway 14 8 miles (13 km) south of Kontum. Tanks from the ARVN 3rd Armored Cavalry Regiment engaged the ambushers and were joined by mechanized infantry, Vietnamese Rangers and CIDG troops. The enemy withdrew at 14:30 leaving 121 dead; U.S. losses were 12 killed. On 10 May a firebase 9 miles (14 km) west of Đắk Tô was attacked, the enemy withdrew leaving 47 dead; U.S. losses were three killed. On 16 May near Landing Zone Brillo Pad Sergeant Anund C. Roark smothered the blast of an enemy hand grenade with his body an action for which he was posthumously awarded the Medal of Honor.

On 21 May Division engineers found a weapons cache 10 miles (16 km) west-northwest of Kontum containing 70 U.S. .45 cal submachine guns.On 22 May a unit of the 3rd Brigade supported by artillery and airstrikes engaged an enemy platoon 19 miles (31 km) west of Kontum killing ten. On 25 May a Division unit engaged an enemy force 8 miles (13 km) west-northwest of Đắk Tô killing 36; U.S. losses were two killed. On 26 May at midnight a 1st Brigade unit at a firebase 11 miles (18 km) west of Đắk Tô was attacked with the enemy penetrating the perimeter and seizing four bunkers. The unit counterattacked and recaptured the positions before the enemy withdrew leaving two captured from the 2nd Battalion, 101D Regiment, 325C Division and 51 individual weapons; U.S. losses were 14 killed. A Division unit found 11 PAVN/VC dead 8 miles west-northwest of Đắk Tô. On 31 May a unit of the 3rd Brigade found 14 PAVN/VC dead 19 miles west of Kontum all were killed by artillery or airstrikes. Landing Zone Brillo Pad was hit by mortar and recoilless rifle fire and a ground probe resulting in one PAVN/VC and three U.S. killed.

Cumulative operational results to the end of May were 4,719 PAVN/VC killed and 1,013 individual and 141 crew-served weapons captured. U.S. losses were 690 killed.

=== June ===
In June, Peers had given expression to MACV policy by ordering that all I FFV operations be given a Vietnamese name as well as an English name to emphasize the importance of combined activities. Thus, Operation MacArthur became Operation Binh Tay–MacArthur.

On 3 June between 20:45 and 22:25 a unit of the 1st Brigade in a night defensive position was hit by mortar and small arms fire resulting in three U.S. killed. On 4 June a convoy on Highway 14 to Đắk Tô was ambushed, the ARVN 3rd Armored Cavalry Regiment supported by helicopter gunships drove off the attackers killing 13 PAVN and capturing 31 individual weapons; U.S. losses were one killed. At 13:05 the convoy was attacked again 4 miles (6.4 km) north-northwest of Kontum and Division units reinforced forcing the PAVN to withdraw leaving 41 dead; U.S. losses were one killed. On 7 June during a firefight near Kontum Private first class Phill G. McDonald would be killed while evacuating wounded soldiers, actions for which he was posthumously awarded the Medal of Honor. On 13 June a Division unit in a night defensive position 28 miles (45 km) north-northwest of Đắk Tô was attacked resulting in 14 PAVN/VC killed.

Cumulative operational results to the end of June were 4,944 PAVN/VC killed and 1,101 individual and 147 crew-served weapons captured. U.S. losses were 728 killed.

=== July ===
On 29 July a unit from the 2nd Brigade and a unit of the Division’s air cavalry squadron engaged a PAVN company 9 miles (14 km) south-southwest of Ban Me Thuot killing 17 PAVN and capturing two individual weapons and two RPG-2 launchers; U.S. losses were two killed. Cumulative operational results to the end of July were 5,020 PAVN/VC killed and 1,119 individual and 166 crew-served weapons captured. U.S. losses were 749 killed.

=== August ===
On 21 August at 13:30 a unit of the air cavalry squadron engaged an enemy force 26 miles (42 km) east-northeast of Ban Me Thuot killing 22 and capturing three individual and one crew-served weapons. On 22 August at 17:15 Firebases 1 and 6 near Đắk Tô were hit by rocket and recoilless rifle fire. On 28 August at 14:00 an aircraft recovery unit supported by helicopter gunships killed 10 PAVN 12 miles (19 km) southwest of Ban Me Thuot; U.S. losses were one killed.

Cumulative operational results to the end of August were 5,176 PAVN/VC killed and 1,177 individual and 183 crew-served weapons captured. U.S. losses were 791 killed.

=== September ===
On 8 September at 09:15 during a road clearing operation 8 miles (13 km) northwest of Ban Me Thuot Regional Force (RF) troops engaged an enemy force. The RF troops were supported by a unit of the air cavalry squadron killing 47 PAVN/VC. On 13 September at 10:00 a unit of the 173rd Airborne Brigade engaged an enemy force 3 miles (4.8 km) north-northwest of Duc Lap Camp killing 14 PAVN/VC; U.S. losses were three killed. On 25 September at 09:30 a company from the 2nd Brigade patrolling 3 miles southwest of Duc Lap was attacked by an enemy company, the battle continued for an hour before the enemy withdrew leaving 35 dead and ten individual and two crew-served weapons; U.S. losses were three killed. On 27 September at 08:00 a unit of the 3rd Brigade engaged an enemy force 1 mile (1.6 km) southeast of Duc Lap, the enemy withdrew at 11:10 leaving 32 dead; U.S. losses were seven killed.

Cumulative operational results to the end of September were 5,402 PAVN/VC killed and 1,246 individual and 185 crew-served weapons captured. U.S. losses were 847 killed.

=== October ===
On 10 October at 11:30 a reconnaissance platoon from the 2nd Brigade found the graves of 15 PAVN 3 miles (4.8 km) southwest of Duc Lap. Later that day in the same area another unit found another eight graves, all had been killed by artillery fire two weeks previously. On 27 October at 11:50 helicopter gunships attacked a PAVN force leaving a village 19 miles (31 km) southwest of Pleiku. Air cavalry troops were landed in the area and found 11 PAVN dead. While sweeping the surrounding area the troops engaged a PAVN force and as the battle continued they were reinforced at 16:00 by a mechanized unit of the 2nd Brigade. At 16:45 an OH-6 Cayuse light observation helicopter was shot down. The PAVN withdrew at 18:45 leaving 37 dead and three individual and six drew-served weapons; U.S. losses were two killed.

Cumulative operational results to the end of October were 5,494 PAVN/VC killed and 1,261 individual and 194 crew-served weapons captured. U.S. losses were 888 killed.

=== November ===
On 2 November at 09:00 a unit of the air cavalry squadron, 17th Combat Aviation Group received fire from an enemy squad 9 miles (14 km) west of Plei Me camp and returned fire supported by artillery and airstrikes killing nine PAVN/VC; U.S. losses were one killed. At 17:00 a firebase located 11 miles (18 km) west of Đắk Tô was hit by 120 rounds of 120 mm mortar fire causing minimal damage. On 4 November at 20:00 a 1st Brigade firebase 9 miles northwest of Đắk Tô was hit by 15 122 mm rockets causing minimal damage. On 5 November airstrikes by United States Air Force A-1 Skyraiders and United States Navy aircraft from the USS Intrepid 15 miles (24 km) west of Đắk Tô caused 37 secondary explosions and fireballs rising to 8,000 feet (2,400 m). On 11 November at 21:00 a 1st Brigade firebase 9 miles (14 km) northwest of Đắk Tô received 125 rounds of mortar, recoilless rifle and artillery fire causing minimal damage. On 13 November at 02:25 Camp Holloway and its surrounding area were hit by 20 122 mm rockets causing minimal damage. Artillery, helicopter gunships and an AC-47 Spooky gunship fired on the firing position.

Cumulative operational results to the end of November were 5,574 PAVN/VC killed and 1,284 individual and 194 crew-served weapons captured. U.S. losses were 915 killed.

=== December ===
On 10 December at 13:00 a company from the 2nd Brigade engaged an enemy force 17 miles (27 km) northeast of Pleiku killing ten and capturing one individual weapon. On 20 December at 11:00 a unit of the 3rd Brigade engaged an enemy platoon 14 miles (23 km) east-southeast of Pleiku, the enemy withdrew into a cave and evaded the unit, but a search of the cave complex found a weapons cache containing seven individual weapons, 97 RPG-2 grenades 72 82 mm mortar rounds and one ton of rice. On 24 December at 18:15, shortly after the start of the Christmas ceasefire a Division team 13 miles (21 km) west of Đắk Tô heard enemy movement 300m west of their perimeter, the team withdrew to their extraction point supported by helicopter gunships and were lifted out at 20:15.

Cumulative operational results to the end of December were 5,612 PAVN/VC killed and 1,299 individual and 194 crew-served weapons captured. U.S. losses were 921 killed.

== Aftermath ==
The operation concluded on 31 January 1969. PAVN/VC losses were 5,731 killed and 1,383 individual and 194 crew-served weapons captured. U.S. losses were 955 killed.
