= Charles J. Watters =

US Army chaplain and Roman Catholic priest

Charles Joseph Watters
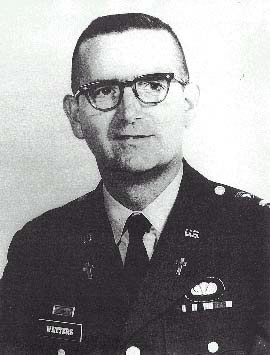
- Major Charles J. Watters
- Born: January 17, 1927; Jersey City, New Jersey, US
- Died: November 19, 1967 (aged 40) near Đắk Tô, Kontum Province, Republic of Vietnam
- Burial place: Arlington National Cemetery
- Military career
- Allegiance: United States of America
- Branch: Air National Guard United States Army
- Service years: 1962–1964 (ANG); 1964–1967 (USA)
- Rank: Major
- Units: Army Chaplain Corps; 173rd Support Battalion
- Conflicts: Vietnam War: Operation Junction City; Battle of Dak To †
- Awards: Medal of Honor; Bronze Star; Purple Heart; Air Medal

Charles Joseph Watters (January 17, 1927 – November 19, 1967) was a chaplain (major) in the United States Army and Roman Catholic priest. He was posthumously awarded the Medal of Honor for bravery exhibited while rescuing wounded men in the Vietnam War's Battle of Dak To.

Born in 1927, Watters joined the Air National Guard in 1962. He left the Guard in 1964 to join the Chaplain Corps, and embarked on his first tour in Vietnam, taking part in Operation Junction City and earning medals during the tour. On an extension of his tour, during the Battle of Dak To, Watters rescued many wounded men from enemy fire, but was killed by a friendly bomb strike from an American bomber.

== Biography ==
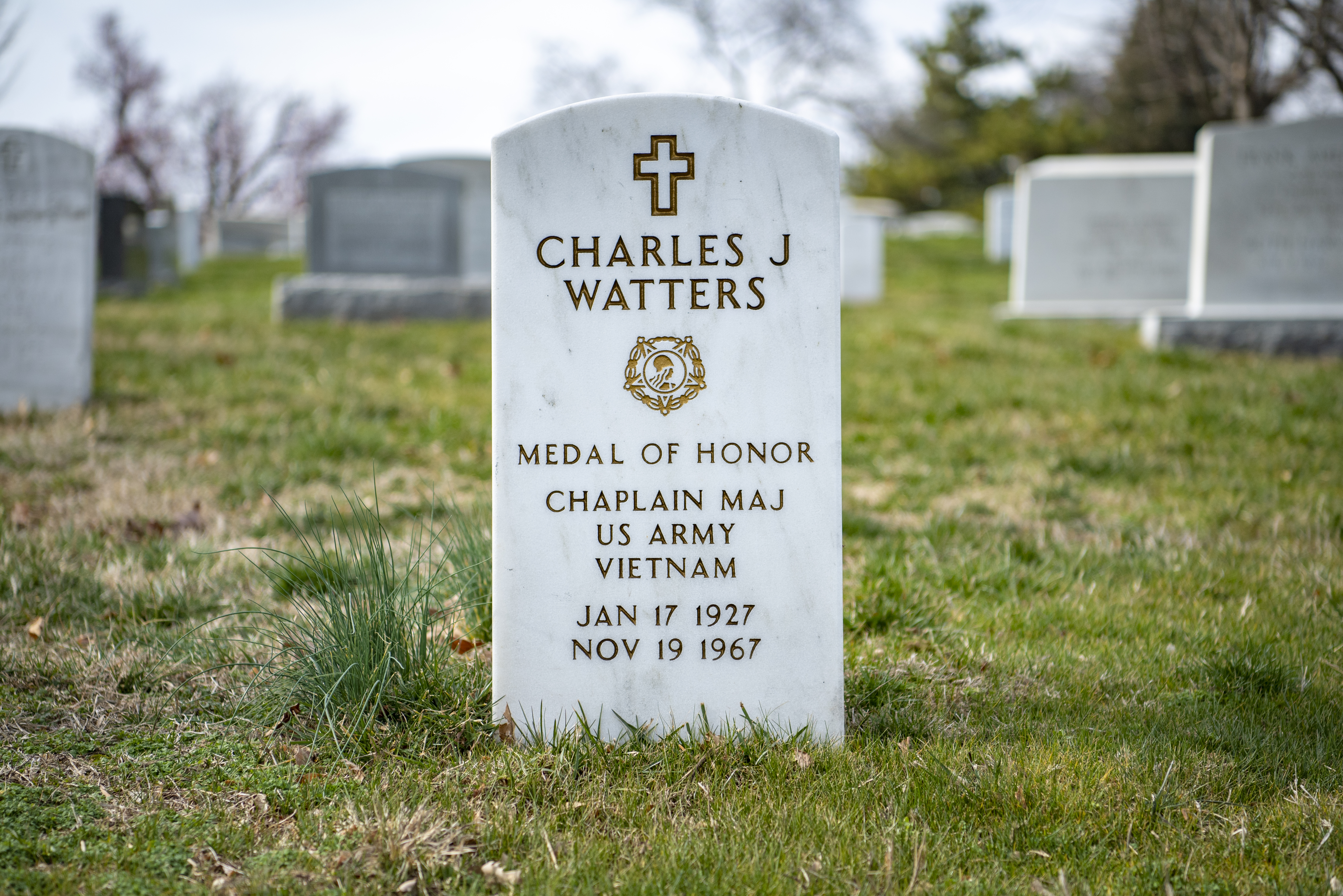
Grave at Arlington National Cemetery

Charles Joseph Watters was born on January 17, 1927, in Jersey City, New Jersey. Watters attended Seton Hall Preparatory School and went on to graduate from Seton Hall University. He was ordained as a priest in 1953 for the Roman Catholic Archdiocese of Newark and served in parishes in Jersey City, Rutherford, Paramus, and Cranford, New Jersey.

Watters was an active private pilot, flying small single-engine planes as far as Argentina. In 1962, Watters became a chaplain with the New Jersey Air National Guard. In 1964, he entered active duty as a chaplain with the U.S. Army. He began his first 12-month tour of duty in Vietnam on July 5, 1966. During his first tour, he was awarded the Air Medal and a Bronze Star for Valor. At the end of his first twelve months, in July 1967, he voluntarily extended his tour for an additional six months.

Chaplain Watters also made the parachute drop in Operation Junction City on 22 February 1967.

On November 19, 1967, Chaplain Watters' unit was involved in close combat with the enemy in the vicinity of Đắk Tô, in which he was ultimately killed by a friendly bomb strike from an American bomber. For his "conspicuous gallantry ... unyielding perseverance and selfless devotion to his comrades" on that day, Chaplain Watters was posthumously awarded the Medal of Honor by Vice President Spiro Agnew in a ceremony that also honored John Andrew Barnes III and Robert F. Stryker. Watters is buried in Arlington National Cemetery.

== Medal of Honor citation ==
The President of the United States in the name of The Congress takes pleasure in presenting the Medal of Honor to

MAJOR CHARLES JOSEPH WATTERS
United States Army

For conspicuous gallantry and intrepidity in action at the risk of his life above and beyond the call of duty. Chaplain Watters distinguished himself during an assault in the vicinity of Đắk Tô. Chaplain Watters was moving with one of the companies when it engaged a heavily armed enemy battalion. As the battle raged and the casualties mounted, Chaplain Watters, with complete disregard for his safety, rushed forward to the line of contact. Unarmed and completely exposed, he moved among, as well as in front of the advancing troops, giving aid to the wounded, assisting in their evacuation, giving words of encouragement, and administering the last rites to the dying. When a wounded paratrooper was standing in shock in front of the assaulting forces, Chaplain Watters ran forward, picked the man up on his shoulders and carried him to safety. As the troopers battled to the first enemy entrenchment, Chaplain Watters ran through the intense enemy fire to the front of the entrenchment to aid a fallen comrade. A short time later, the paratroopers pulled back in preparation for a second assault. Chaplain Watters exposed himself to both friendly and enemy fire between the two forces in order to recover two wounded soldiers. Later, when the battalion was forced to pull back into a perimeter, Chaplain Watters noticed that several wounded soldiers were lying outside the newly formed perimeter. Without hesitation and ignoring attempts to restrain him, Chaplain Watters left the perimeter three times in the face of small arms, automatic weapons, and mortar fire to carry and to assist the injured troopers to safety. Satisfied that all of the wounded were inside the perimeter, he began aiding the medics ... applying field bandages to open wounds, obtaining and serving food and water, giving spiritual and mental strength and comfort. During his ministering, he moved out to the perimeter from position to position redistributing food and water, and tending to the needs of his men. Chaplain Watters was giving aid to the wounded when he himself was mortally wounded. Chaplain Watters' unyielding perseverance and selfless devotion to his comrades was in keeping with the highest traditions of the U.S. Army.

== In memory ==
The name Charles Joseph Watters is inscribed on the Vietnam Veterans Memorial ("The Wall") on Panel 30E, Row 036.

The bridge on Route 3 in New Jersey spanning the Passaic River between Clifton and Rutherford has been named in honor of Chaplain Watters.

Public School No. 24 in Jersey City was named after him in the 1980s.

Chaplain Charles J Watters Center in Fort Campbell, Kentucky.

The Seton Hall University Army ROTC Ranger Challenge team is named the Charlie Watters Ranger Company.

At the Roman Catholic Church of the Epiphany in Cliffside Park, New Jersey, there is a rose garden dedicated in memory of Watters. There is a memorial plaque located in the center of the garden. It was organized and constructed in the late 1990s by classmate and friend, Fr. Thomas Olsen, then pastor of Epiphany Church.

Watters Chaplain Family Life Training Center on Fort Bragg, North Carolina.

There is a memorial located at St. Michael's Church in Cranford, NJ commemorating his service to the parish and receiving the Medal of Honor.

== Awards and decorations ==
During his service, Watters was awarded the following awards and decorations;

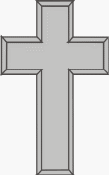

| Badge | Chaplain's Badge (Christian) | | |
| Badge | Basic Parachutist's Badge (not shown is one bronze star for his combat jump) | | |
| 1st row | Medal of Honor | | |
| 2nd row | Bronze Star Medal w/ "V" for valor | Purple Heart | Air Medal |
| 3rd row | National Defense Service Medal | Vietnam Service Medal w/ Arrowhead device and two bronze campaign stars | Vietnam Campaign Medal with Device (1960– ) |

He also earned the following unit awards;

| Presidential Unit Citation | Meritorious Unit Commendation | Gallantry Cross of South Vietnam |

== See also ==
- List of Chaplain Corps Medal of Honor recipients
- List of Medal of Honor recipients
- List of Medal of Honor recipients for the Vietnam War
- Chaplain Corps (United States Army)
- Roman Catholic Archdiocese for the Military Services, USA
