= Operation Bolling =

Part of the Vietnam War (1967–1969)

- Part of the Vietnam War
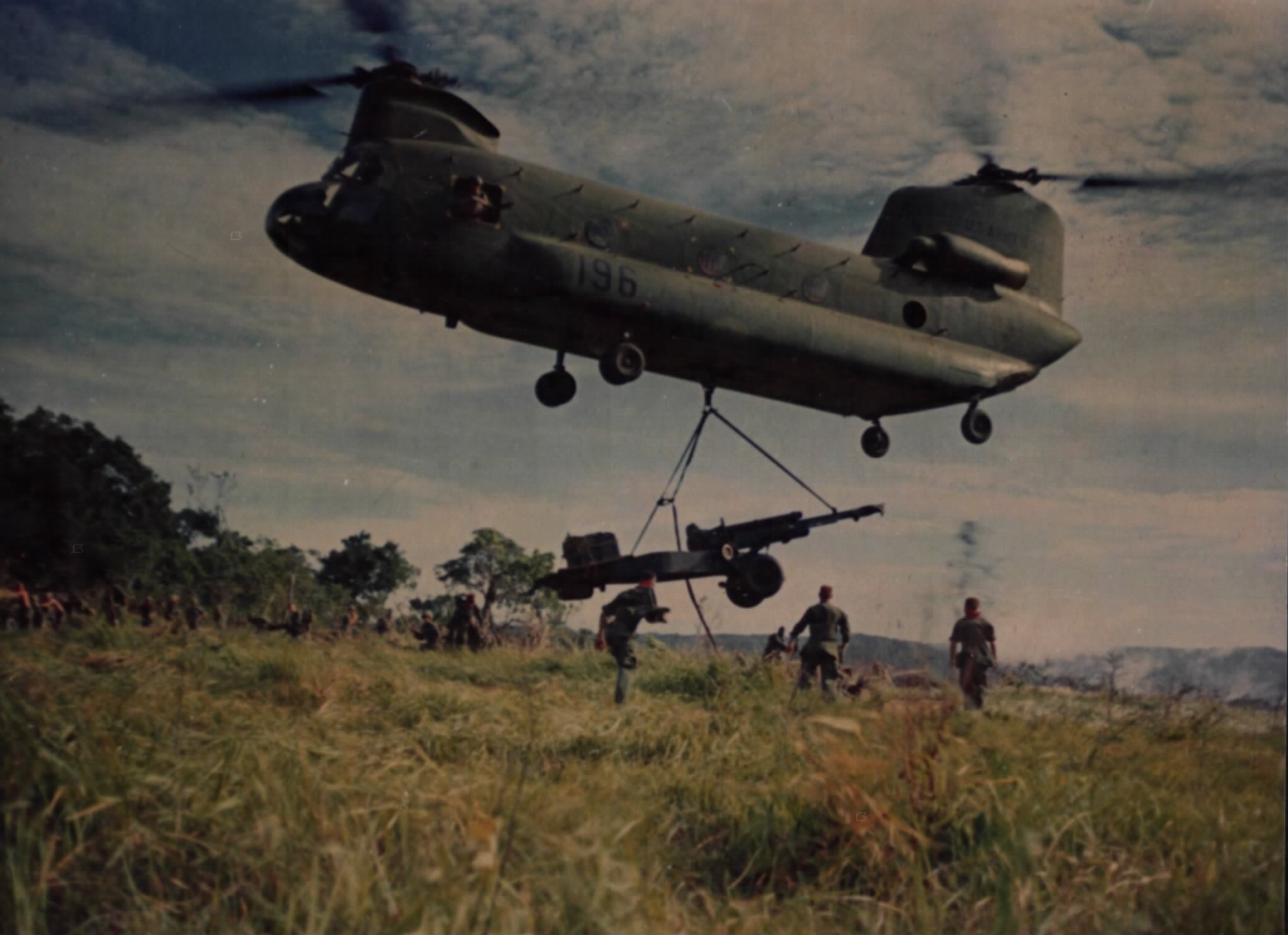
- A CH-47 lands a 105mm howitzer 20km northwest of Tuy Hoa, 19 September 1967
| Date | 19 September 1967 – 31 January 1969 |
| Location | Phú Yên Province, South Vietnam |

Belligerents
| United States | North Vietnam |

Commanders and leaders
| BG Leo H. Schweiter | |

Units involved
| 503rd Infantry Regiment | 95th Regiment |

Casualties and losses
| 67 killed 1 helicopter destroyed | 693 killed 59 captured 247 weapons recovered |
- 20,000 civilians displaced

Operation Bolling was a search and destroy and security operation conducted during the Vietnam War by the U.S. 503rd Infantry Regiment in Phú Yên Province, South Vietnam from 19 September 1967 to 31 January 1969.

== Background ==
Following the completion of Operation Greeley, in September 1967 General William B. Rosson instructed the commander of the 173rd Airborne Brigade, Brigadier General Leo H. Schweiter, to locate and destroy the People's Army of Vietnam (PAVN) 95th Regiment, which was believed to be located in a base area known as “The Hub” in the foothills northwest of Tuy Hòa in Phú Yên Province. When the Battle of Dak To intensified in early November, the 173rd Airborne Brigade was called back to the Đắk Tô area and responsibility for the operation fell to the newly arrived 3rd Battalion, 503rd Infantry Regiment.

== Operation ==
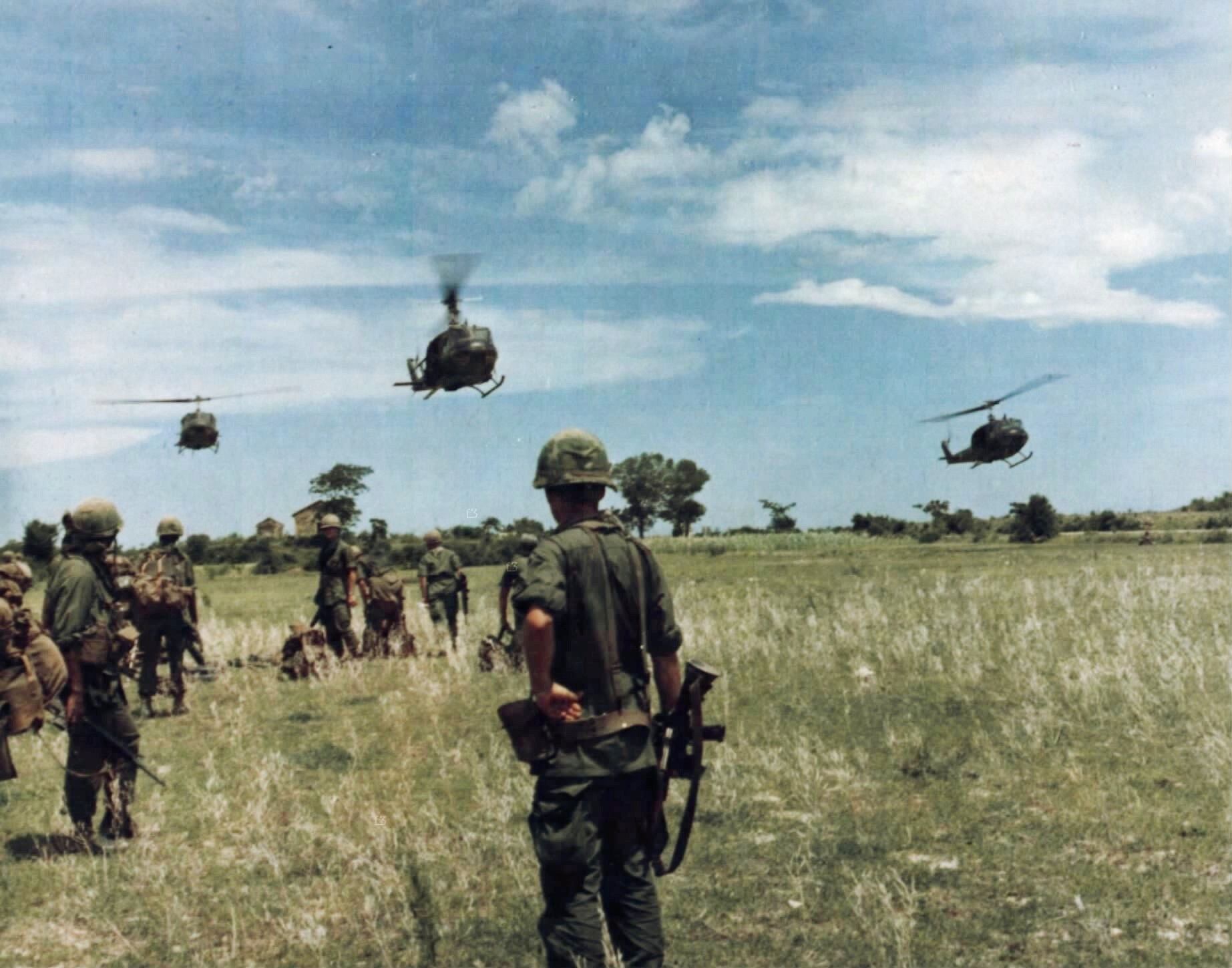
UH-1Ds landing near 17th Cavalry positions, 21 September 1967

The operation began uneventfully and in mid-December following the end of the Battle of Dak To, the Brigade headquarters and the 4th Battalion, 503rd Infantry, returned to join the operation.

In late December after Army of the Republic of Vietnam (ARVN) forces had been ambushed in the Ky Lo Valley, 45 kilometers northwest of Tuy Hòa, the commander of the 3/503rd Lt. Col. John R. D. Cleland landed a scout platoon there on 27 December. The platoon came under heavy fire after landing and Lt. Col. Cleland landed the remainder of his battalion in the area to engage the PAVN force. Company A landed near the hamlet of Xom Dap, 2km south of the initial contact area in a 200m by 50m landing zone surrounded by hedges and trees. PAVN forces in bunkers around the landing zone opened fire on the Company as soon as they touched down, killing or wounding numerous Americans and destroying one helicopter. Company A fought back and gradually began to destroy the PAVN bunkers. At approximately 15:30 the PAVN broke contact when a company from 4/503rd Infantry was landed nearby. 62 PAVN were killed for the loss of 12 Americans killed.

Operational results to the end of December were 693 PAVN/VC killed and 228 individual and 19 crew-served weapons captured. U.S. losses were 67 killed.

== Aftermath ==
The operation continued until 31 January 1969. US sources claim that PAVN losses in the operation were in excess of 693 killed and 59 captured. 103 PAVN structures and 177 bunkers were destroyed, but a further 4,000 civilian structures were also destroyed, displacing about 20,000 civilians.
