= Operation Greeley =

Part of the Vietnam War (1967)

- Part of Vietnam War
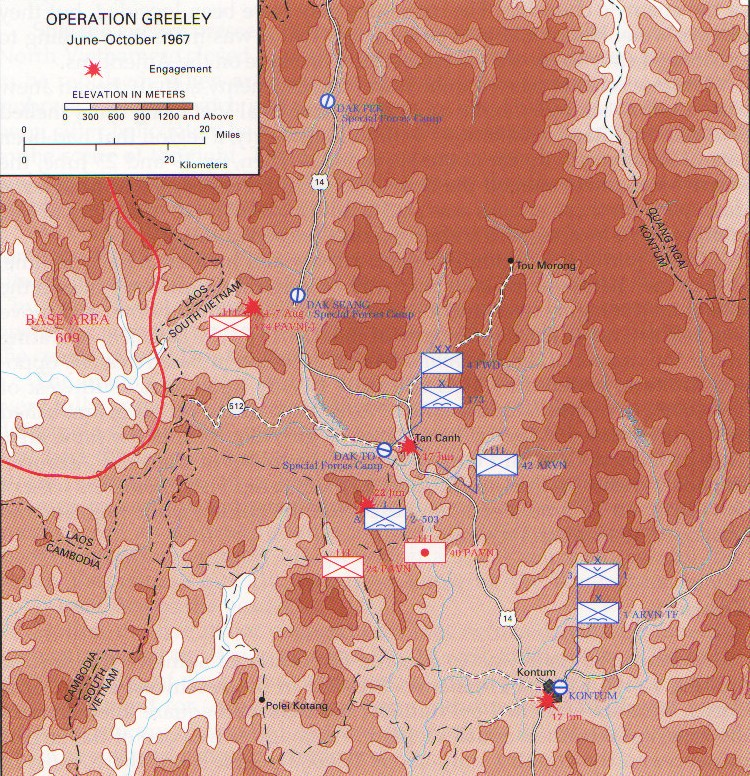
- Operation Greeley and the Dak To area
Date	17 June – 11 October 1967 (3 months, 3 weeks and 3 days)
Location	Kontum Province, South Vietnam
Result	Inconclusive

Belligerents
United States; South Vietnam	North Vietnam

Commanders and leaders
(United States) Stanley R. Larsen (United States) William R. Peers (United States) John R. Deane Jr.	Unknown

Units involved
(United States) 173rd Airborne Brigade (United States) 3rd Brigade, 1st Cavalry Division (South Vietnam) 42nd Regiment (South Vietnam) Republic of Vietnam Airborne Division	24th Infantry Regiment; 174th Infantry Regiment

Casualties and losses
(United States) killed (South Vietnam) killed	US body count: killed

Operation Greeley was a 173rd Airborne Brigade, 3rd Brigade, 1st Cavalry Division, Army of the Republic of Vietnam (ARVN) 22nd Division operation that took place in Kontum Province, South Vietnam, lasting from 17 June to 11 October 1967.

== Background ==
Nestled in the northwest corner of II Corps, Kontum Province stretched over almost 10,000 square kilometers of the roughest terrain in South Vietnam. Although it was one of the largest provinces in the country, only about 100,000 people lived there, most of them Montagnards.

Mahogany and other hardwood trees grew to 60 meters in height in the region south of Đăk Tô, forming a thick canopy that limited the effectiveness of air support and artillery fire. Below the canopy was a dense secondary growth of bamboo, vines, small trees, and scrub that reduced visibility on the ground and made movement through the highland forests a grueling task. Those few areas that appeared as clearings on military maps were often choked with bamboo, and in the jungle proper the air was still, the wildlife often watchful and mute, and nature's ability to regenerate astounding. Decay hastened by the constant moisture made the jungle floor an endlessly fermenting compost. Weather and topography had an impact as well. Steep and slippery spiny spurs, many uncharted, radiated downward from the high ridges into the narrow valleys, and movement through the higher, steeper elevations was always difficult. Mountains, ridges, and high hills also interfered with radio communications and aerial resupply, as did the weather. Regularly during the rainy season the region was beset by low-hanging clouds and fog that obscured the tops of ridges until late morning, while heavy showers often continued throughout the day.

The North Vietnamese put Kontum's isolation to good use. One spur of the Ho Chi Minh Trail emptied into Base Area 609, a supply depot near the junction of South Vietnam, Laos, and Cambodia, the so-called tri-border area. In 1967 Base Area 609 grew into a major binh tram, or military way station, on the Ho Chi Minh Trail. In the earliest days of American involvement, combat had centered on the string of Special Forces camps arrayed along the Laotian border. In mid-1966 the 1st Brigade of the 101st Airborne Division had battled the People's Army of Vietnam (PAVN) 24th Regiment which simply melted back into Laos to regroup.

In May 1967, as the rainy season began, intelligence believed that PAVN forces in the base area were growing in strength, hoping to draw the Americans back into the Central Highlands and to establish new infiltration routes to the coast. Early on 17 June a battalion of the 24th Regiment attacked the compound of the Army of the Republic of Vietnam (ARVN) 24th Special Tactical Zone at Kontum City with 50 rounds of mortar fire. Three hours later another battalion of the 24th, reinforced with a battalion of the 40th Artillery Regiment, struck the headquarters of the ARVN 42nd Regiment, 22nd Division at Tân Cảnh and the 5th Special Forces Group camp at Đăk Tô with mortars and rockets. Four of the 100 rounds that fell on Tân Cảnh were long-range 122-mm. rockets, and ten of the 60 rounds that hit Đăk Tô were 120-mm. mortar rounds, marking the first time the PAVN had employed such large caliber weapons in II Corps.

== Operation ==
On 17 June, Major General William Peers, the 4th Division commander, order two battalions (1st and 2nd Battalions, 503rd Airborne Infantry Regiment) of Brigadier general John R. Deane's 173rd Airborne Brigade to move into the Đắk Tô area to begin sweeping the jungle-covered mountains.

On 20 June, Company C, 2/503rd discovered the bodies of a CIDG unit that had been missing for four days on Hill 1338 (14.6°N 107.776°E), the dominant hill mass south of Đắk Tô. Supported by Company A, the Americans moved up the hill and set up for the night. At 06:58 the following morning, Company A began moving alone up a ridge finger and triggered an ambush by the PAVN 6th Battalion, 24th Regiment. Company C was ordered to go to support, but heavy vegetation and difficult terrain made movement extremely difficult. Artillery support was rendered ineffective by the limited range of visibility and the "belt-grabbing" - or "hugging" - tactics of the PAVN (PAVN/VC troops were instructed to open their actions or move as close to American forces as possible, thereby negating U.S. artillery, aerial, and helicopter gunship strikes, which demanded a safety margin for utilization – hence, "grabbing the enemy by the belt). Close air support was impossible for the same reasons. Company A managed to survive repeated attacks throughout the day and night, but the cost was heavy. On 23 June 2/503rd soldiers reached the Company A site and found four soldiers still alive, over half of the dead had head wounds inflicted at close range, which indicated that the PAVN had systematically executed the wounded. The losses in Company A totaled 79 dead and 23 wounded. Eighteen enemy bodies were located during the following days, with the final total 106 dead and 45 weapons captured.

U.S. headquarters press releases, made four days after the conclusion of what came to be called "The Battle of the Slopes", claimed that 475 PAVN had been killed while the 173rd's combat after action report claimed 513 enemy dead. The men of Company A estimated that only 50–75 PAVN troops had been killed during the entire action. Such losses among American troops could not go unpunished. The operations officer of the 4th Infantry went so far as to recommend that Deane be relieved of command. Such a drastic measure, however, would only provide more grist for what was becoming a public relations fiasco. In the end, the commander and junior officers of Company C (whose only crime was that of caution) were transferred to other units.

Concerned about the size of the battle and the U.S. losses, I Field Force commander General Stanley R. Larsen flew from his Nha Trang headquarters to meet with Peers at Đắk Tô. Although Peers had already approved reinforcing Deane with the 4th Battalion, 503d Infantry, the 173d's remaining battalion still operating in Pleiku Province, none of the senior commanders could say for certain that it would be enough. Based on conversations with the returning troops and air observers, Deane's staff believed that the Americans had bumped into the better part of a regiment. From other intelligence, the generals concluded that the airborne brigade might soon face up to three PAVN regiments in a region that greatly restricted air and artillery support.

Returning to Nha Trang, Larsen briefed COMUSMACV General William Westmoreland. At the time reinforcing with units of the 4th Division seemed like a bad idea, because Peers expected that such a move would only encourage a PAVN 1st Division offensive in Pleiku. Instead, Larsen proposed sending a brigade of the 1st Cavalry Division to Kontum Province: one battalion to reinforce Đắk Tô and the others to positions just north of Kontum City, where the 24th Regiment was thought to be lurking. Aerial resupply would be necessary at first, but Larsen asked the ARVN II Corps' command to secure the road from Pleiku to Tan Canh.

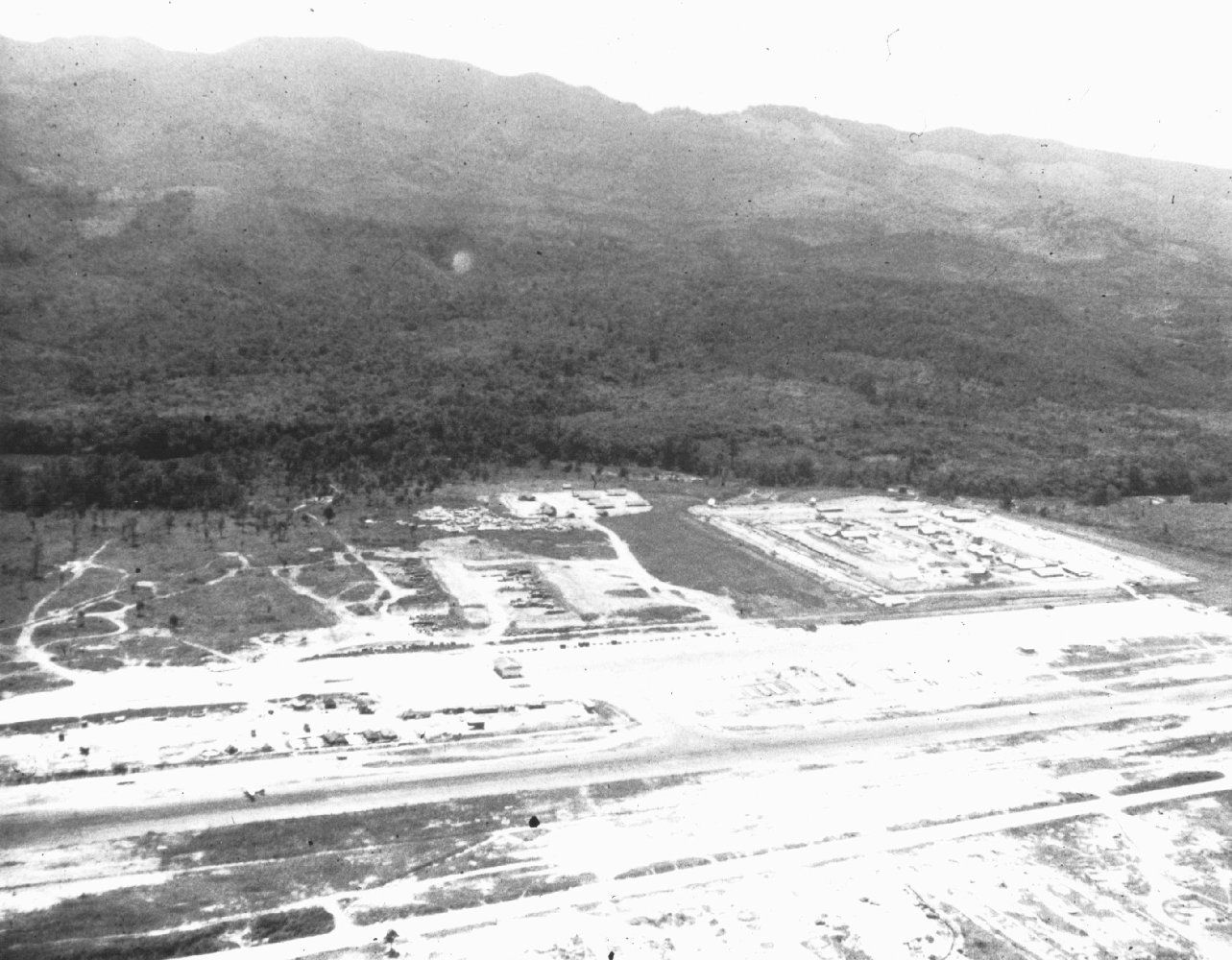
Aerial view of Đắk Tô Base Camp looking toward Laos

On 23 June Westmoreland approved Larsen's plan and arranged to have a two-battalion Airborne task force, part of the South Vietnamese general reserve, fly to Kontum City, where it would join forces with the reinforcing cavalry brigade. He also gave the Kontum battle area priority for tactical air support and placed the 1st Brigade, 101st Airborne Division, then with Task Force Oregon, on alert.

The arrival of a 1st Cavalry Division contingent at Đắk Tô on 23 June gave Deane four infantry battalions. Two of these units, the 2nd Battalion, 12th Cavalry and the 4th Battalion, 503rd Infantry, were sent to block the PAVN's withdrawal routes into Laos. On 28 June, the 4/503rd fought a PAVN company, many of whose soldiers were sporting American uniforms, M16 rifles, and M79 grenade launchers. After the PAVN fled that afternoon, the Americans found six dead and one wounded PAVN, who told them that the K-101D Battalion had obtained the equipment when it overran a Civilian Irregular Defense Group program (CIDG) unit earlier that month. Encouraged, Deane committed the 1/503rd west and southwest of Đắk Tô.

One week later, allied signal intelligence pinpointed a PAVN regimental headquarters 20 miles (32 km) southwest of Đắk Tô. After establishing Fire Support Base 4 on Hill 664, approximately 11 kilometers southwest of Đắk Tô, on 10 July the 4/503rd was moving in column near the crest of Hill 830 when machine guns opened up on the lead company. As the pointmen scrambled for cover, they saw that the fire was coming from concealed bunkers on a hilltop 35 meters away. While US artillery rounds rained down on the PAVN positions, a second company moved to outflank the enemy, only to be halted by small-arms fire. The third company went after the opposite flank, and it was also stopped by machine gun fire. The fight dragged on for several hours, until the PAVN withdrew during an afternoon storm. The 4/503rd suffered 22 dead and 62 wounded. When they entered the PAVN position the next day, they found an abandoned complex of mutually supporting bunkers, many with 2 feet (0.61 m) of overhead cover, and nine enemy bodies.

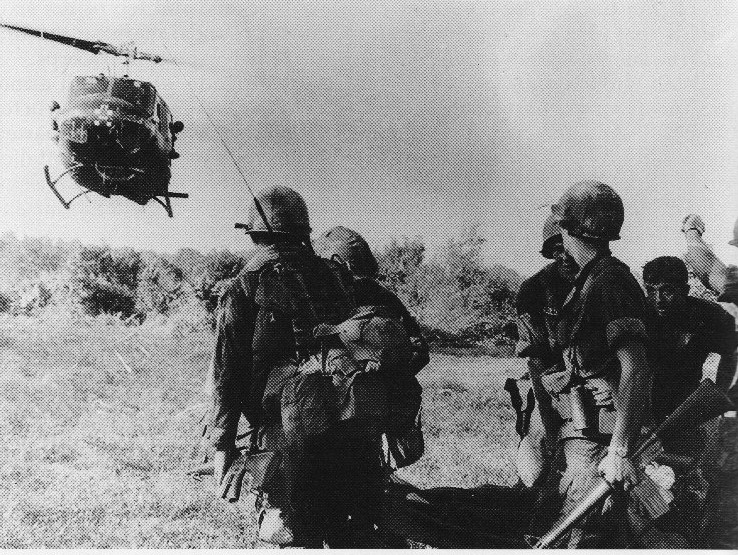
173rd Airborne troops during Operation Greeley

During the next two weeks the sweeps continued, but with few results. Deane's men ran into one PAVN platoon, killing 13, and found recently used trails and abandoned base camps, but conducted no major actions. According to one prisoner, the Doc Lop Regiment, an ad hoc unit composed of independent battalions, was operating against the Đắk Tô-Tan Canh area, but apparently had either departed or had simply found the noisy American troops easy to evade.

Other American operations stepped off north of Kontum City on 24 June. There, Brigadier general Glenn D. Walker, the senior assistant commander of the 4th Division, set up an advanced headquarters as the 3rd Brigade, 1st Cavalry Division and the South Vietnamese 1st Airborne Task Force arrived to conduct combined operations against the PAVN 24th Regiment, still thought to be somewhere in the Dak Akoi River Valley, 35km east of Đắk Tô.

On 26 June, in the wake of three B-52 raids, the South Vietnamese moved up Highway 14 for a drive east toward the valley. That same day the air cavalry brigade was ordered to conduct airmobile assaults into the valley proper and to serve as a blocking force. Although bad weather delayed the attack, the effort was in full swing by early July. As always, finding the enemy proved difficult. On 5 July a captured PAVN soldier claimed that the headquarters of the 24th was nearby, and Walker immediately reinforced with the 2/12th Cavalry. But they found no trace of the enemy, and on 25 July the cavalry brigade returned to the coast, while the Vietnamese task force stood down at Kontum, serving as a mobile reaction force.

The last major action of the operation happened in early August near the Dak Seang Camp. Prisoner interrogations indicated that the North Vietnamese had recently moved a new unit, the 174th Regiment, into the Dak Poko Valley with the intent of overrunning the Special Forces camps at Dak Pek and Dak Seang 45 and 20 kilometers north of Đắk Tô respectively. Both camps had endured harassing fire over the past few weeks, and when the PAVN ambushed a CIDG patrol within a kilometer of Dak Seang on 3 August it seemed clear that the predicted offensive was imminent.

The ARVN 24th Special Zone immediately airlifted a battalion of the 42nd Regiment and the entire 1st Airborne Task Force to the camp, adding a third airborne battalion soon after. As these forces pushed westward into the rugged hills overlooking Dak Seang, they met a strongly entrenched and reinforced battalion of the 174th Regiment. After a fight lasting four days, with heavy air support called in by U.S. advisers, the ARVN seized the position and drove the enemy into Laos. The ARVN found 189 enemy bodies, large quantities of ammunition and equipment, and a sophisticated regimental command post with training areas and an elaborate mock-up of the Dak Seang camp. The Vietnamese speculated that the regiment had probably planned to attack Dak Seang on the moonless night of 6 August.

By mid-August, contact with PAVN forces decreased, leading the Americans to conclude that they had withdrawn across the border. The 2/503rd remained at Đắk Tô along with the ARVN 3rd Airborne Battalion to carry out a sweep of the Toumarong Valley north of Đắk Tô and the suspected location of a PAVN regimental headquarters.

== Aftermath ==
The operation ended on 11 October. The 173rd Airborne Brigade redeloyed to Phú Yên Province. The bulk of the ARVN Airborne units were then returned to their bases around Saigon for rest and refitting.
