= Edward A. Partain =

United States Army general

- Born: 26 June 1929; Memphis, Tennessee, U.S.
- Died: 24 March 1996 (aged 66); Pinehurst, North Carolina, U.S.
- Burial place: West Point Cemetery
- Military career
- Allegiance: United States of America
- Branch: United States Army
- Service years: 1951–1985
- Rank: Lieutenant general
- Commands: Fifth United States Army; 1st Infantry Division
- Conflicts: Korean War; Vietnam War
- Awards: Distinguished Service Medal; Silver Star; Legion of Merit; Distinguished Flying Cross

Lieutenant general Edward Allen Partain (23 June 1929 – 24 March 1996) was a United States Army officer who served in the Korean War and the Vietnam War.

== Military career ==
He graduated from the United States Military Academy (West Point) in 1951.

In 1964 he assisted Colonel Clyde Russell in establishing Military Assistance Command, Vietnam – Studies and Observations Group.

In June 1967 he served as commander of the 2nd Battalion, 503rd Infantry Regiment, part of the 173rd Airborne Brigade during the Vietnam War and participated in the Battle of the Slopes.

He served as commanding general of the 1st Infantry Division from July 1980 to December 1982.

He served as commanding general, Fifth United States Army from January 1983 until his retirement from the Army in January 1985.
