= Anund C. Roark =

- Army Medal of Honor
- Born: February 17, 1948; Vallejo, California, U.S.
- Died: May 16, 1968 (aged 20) near Landing Zone Brillo Pad, Kontum Province, Republic of Vietnam
- Burial place: Fort Rosecrans National Cemetery, San Diego, California
- Military career
- Allegiance: United States of America
- Branch: United States Army
- Service years: 1966–1968
- Rank: Sergeant
- Units: Company C, 1st Battalion, 12th Infantry Regiment, 4th Infantry Division
- Conflicts: Vietnam War †
- Awards: Medal of Honor

Anund Charles Roark (February 17, 1948 – May 16, 1968) was a United States Army soldier and a recipient of the United States military's highest decoration—the Medal of Honor—for his actions in the Vietnam War.

== Biography ==
Roark joined the Army from Los Angeles, California, in 1966, and by May 16, 1968, was serving as a Sergeant in Company C, 1st Battalion, 12th Infantry Regiment, 4th Infantry Division. On that day, near Landing Zone Brillo Pad in Kontum Province, South Vietnam, during Operation MacArthur Roark smothered the blast of an enemy-thrown hand grenade with his body, protecting his fellow soldiers at the cost of his own life.

Roark, aged 20 at his death, was buried in Fort Rosecrans National Cemetery, San Diego, California.

== Medal of Honor citation ==
Sergeant Roark's official Medal of Honor citation reads:

For conspicuous gallantry and intrepidity in action at the risk of his life above and beyond the call of duty. Sgt. Roark distinguished himself by extraordinary gallantry while serving with Company C. Sgt. Roark was the point squad leader of a small force which had the mission of rescuing 11 men in a hilltop observation post under heavy attack by a company-size force, approximately 1,000 meters from the battalion perimeter. As lead elements of the relief force reached the besieged observation post, intense automatic weapons fire from enemy occupied bunkers halted their movement. Without hesitation, Sgt. Roark maneuvered his squad, repeatedly exposing himself to withering enemy fire to hurl grenades and direct the fire of his squad to gain fire superiority and cover the withdrawal of the outpost and evacuation of its casualties. Frustrated in their effort to overrun the position, the enemy swept the hilltop with small arms and volleys of grenades. Seeing a grenade land in the midst of his men, Sgt. Roark, with complete disregard for his safety, hurled himself upon the grenade, absorbing its blast with his body. Sgt. Roark's magnificent leadership and dauntless courage saved the lives of many of his comrades and were the inspiration for the successful relief of the outpost. His actions which culminated in the supreme sacrifice of his life were in keeping with the highest traditions of the military service, and reflect great credit on himself and the U.S. Army.

== See also ==
- List of Medal of Honor recipients for the Vietnam War
