= Battle of Dak To =

1967 battle of the Vietnam War

- Part of the Vietnam War
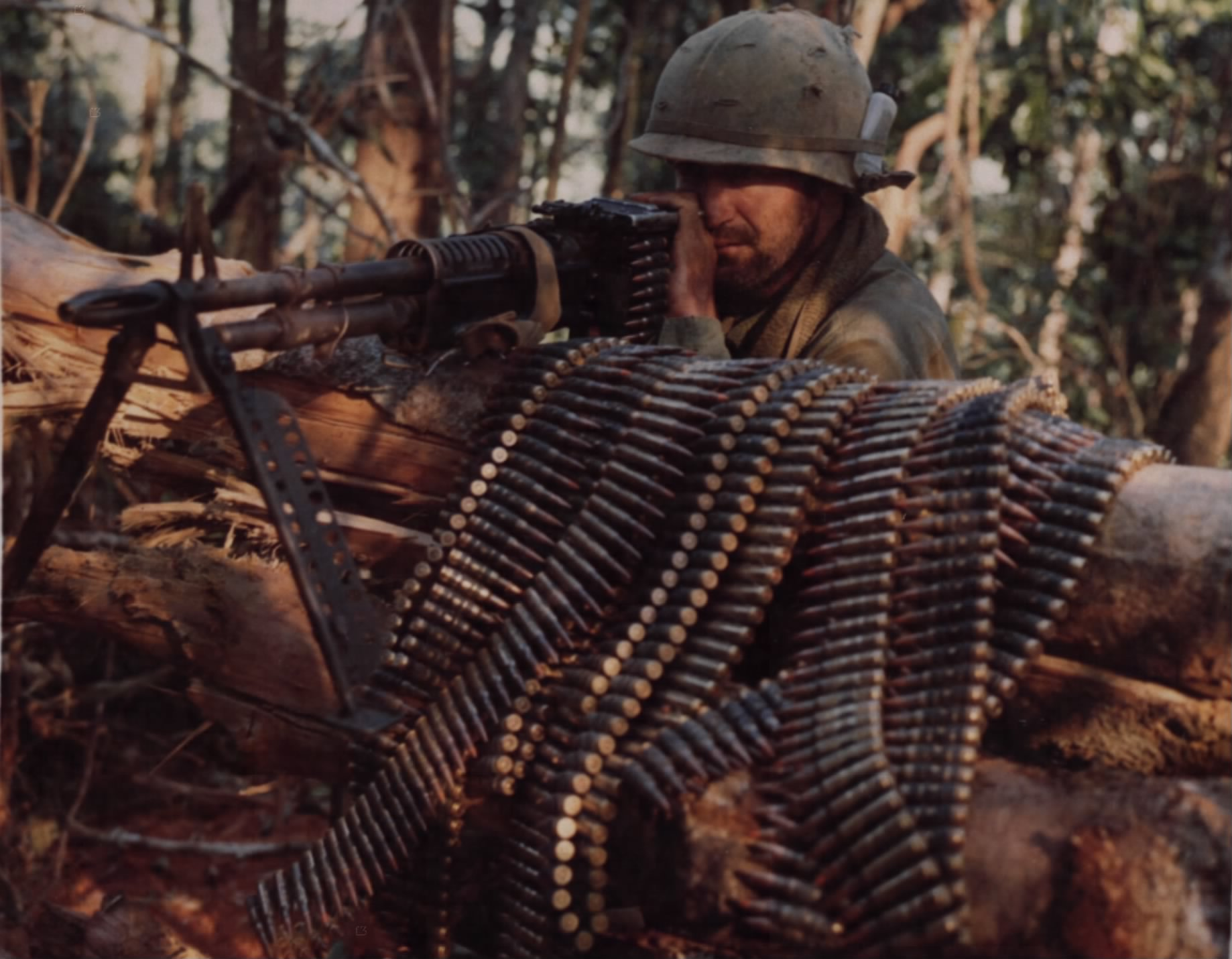
- Machinegunner of the 173rd Airborne Brigade on guard in preparation for the final assault on Hill 875, located 15 miles southwest of Dak To.
Date	3–23 November 1967
Location	Dak To, Kontum Province, South Vietnam 14°39′4″N 107°47′55″E
Result	See "Aftermath"

Belligerents
United States; South Vietnam	North Vietnam; Viet Cong

Commanders and leaders
MG William R. Peers; BG Leo H. Schweiter	Hoàng Minh Thảo (Military); Trần Thế Môn (Political)

Strength
16,000	~Four Regiments; ~6,000

Casualties and losses
(United States) 361 killed 15 missing 1,441 wounded 40 helicopters lost Two C-130 Hercules transport aircraft, one F-4C fighter lost (South Vietnam) 73 killed 18 missing 290 wounded Total: 434 killed 33 missing 1,771 wounded PAVN/VC claim: ~4,500 casualties 70 aircraft destroyed 52 vehicles destroyed 18 artillery pieces destroyed 104 guns captured	US body count: ~1,000–1,664 killed ~1,000–2,000 wounded 275 individual and 94 crew-served weapons recovered PAVN/VC’s report: ~450 killed 1,089 wounded

The Battle of Dak To (Vietnamese: Chiến dịch Đắk Tô - Tân Cảnh) in Vietnam was a series of major engagements of the Vietnam War that took place between 3 and 23 November 1967, in Kontum Province, in the Central Highlands of the Republic of Vietnam (South Vietnam). The action at Đắk Tô was one of a series of People's Army of Vietnam (PAVN) offensive initiatives that began during the second half of the year. PAVN attacks at Lộc Ninh (in Bình Long Province), Sông Bé (in Phước Long Province) and at Con Thien and Khe Sanh, (in Quảng Trị Province), were other actions which, combined with Đắk Tô, became known as "the border battles". The post hoc purported objective of the PAVN forces was to distract American and South Vietnamese forces away from cities towards the borders in preparation for the Tet Offensive.

During the summer of 1967, engagements with PAVN forces in the area prompted the launching of Operation Greeley, a combined search and destroy effort by elements of the U. S. 4th Infantry Division and 173rd Airborne Brigade, along with the Army of the Republic of Vietnam (ARVN) 42nd Infantry Regiment, 22nd Division and Airborne units. The fighting was intense and lasted into late 1967, when the PAVN seemingly withdrew.

By late October U.S. intelligence indicated that local communist units had been reinforced and combined into the PAVN 1st Division, which was to capture Đắk Tô and destroy a brigade-size U.S. unit. Information provided by a PAVN defector provided the allies a good indication of the locations of PAVN forces. This intelligence prompted the launching of Operation MacArthur and brought the units back to the area along with more reinforcements from the ARVN Airborne Division. The battles on the hill masses south and southeast of Đắk Tô became some of the hardest-fought and bloodiest battles of the Vietnam War.

== Background ==
=== Border outpost ===
During the early stages of the U.S. involvement in the Vietnam War, several U.S. Special Forces Civilian Irregular Defense Group (CIDG) camps were established along the borders of South Vietnam in order both to maintain surveillance of PAVN and Viet Cong (VC) infiltration and to provide support and training to isolated Montagnard villagers, who bore the brunt of the fighting in the area. One of these camps was built near the village and airstrip at Đắk Tô. After 1965, Đắk Tô was also utilized as a forward operations base by the highly classified MACV-SOG, which launched reconnaissance teams from there to gather intelligence on the Ho Chi Minh Trail across the border in Laos. In 1967, under the overall direction of commander of Special Forces in Vietnam, Colonel Jonathan Ladd, the camp began to take mortar fire. Ladd flew in, organized reconnaissance and identified the entrenched hill bunker complex as the source of the shelling. Journalist Neil Sheehan quoted Ladd as recommending, unsuccessfully, to Major General William R. Peers: "For God's sake, General, don't send our people in there .... That's what the bastards want us to do. They'll butcher our people. If they want to fight us, let them come down here where we can kill them."

Đắk Tô lies on a flat valley floor, surrounded by waves of ridgelines that rise into peaks (some as high as 4,000-foot (1,200 m)) that stretch westward and southwestward towards the tri-border region where South Vietnam, Laos and Cambodia meet. Western Kontum Province is covered by double- and triple-canopy rainforests, and the only open areas were filled in by bamboo groves whose stalks sometimes reached 8 inches (200 mm) in diameter. Landing zones (LZs) large enough for helicopters were few and far between, which meant that most troop movements could only be carried out on foot. Temperatures in the highlands could reach 95 degrees Fahrenheit (35 degrees Celsius) during the day and could drop to as low as 55 °F (13 °C) in the evening.

=== Operation Greeley ===
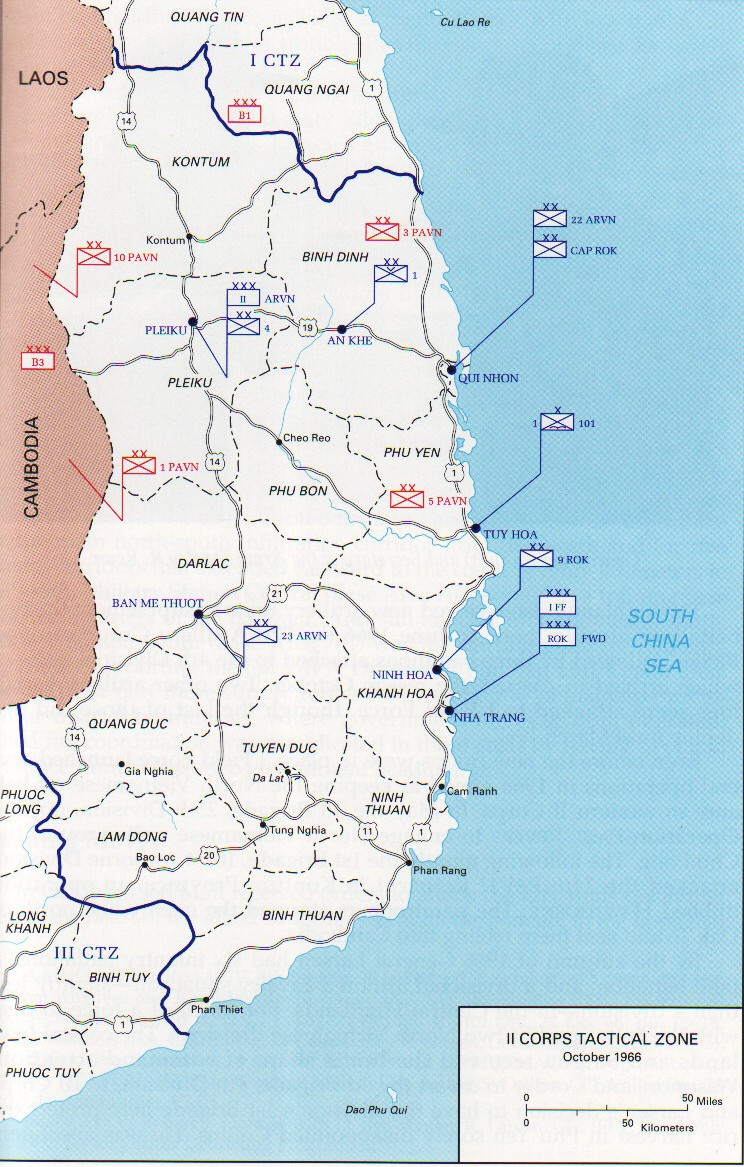
The II Corps Tactical Zone, the Central Highlands of South Vietnam

In January 1967, Peers had taken command of the 4th Infantry Division, which had responsibility for the defense of western Kontum Province. Prior to the onset of the summer monsoon, Peers set up blocking positions from the 4th Infantry Division's 1st Brigade base camp at Jackson Hole, west of Pleiku, and launched Operation Francis Marion on 17 May. The 4th had on hand its 1st and 2nd Brigades, while its 3rd Brigade operated with the 25th Infantry Division northwest of Saigon.

Throughout the middle of 1967, however, western Kontum Province became a magnet for several PAVN spoiling attacks and it appeared that the PAVN were paying an increasing amount of attention to the area. Immediately after taking command, Peers instituted guidelines for his units in order to prevent them from being isolated and overrun in the rugged terrain, which also did much to negate the U.S. superiority in firepower. Battalions were to act as single units instead of breaking down into individual companies in order to search for their enemy. If rifle companies had to act independently, they were not to operate more than one kilometer or one hour's march from one another. If contact with the enemy was made, the unit was to be immediately reinforced. These measures went far in reducing the 4th Infantry's casualties.

From 17 June to 11 October the 173rd Airborne Brigade, 4th Division units and ARVN units conducted Operation Greeley in and around the Dak To area.

== Prelude ==
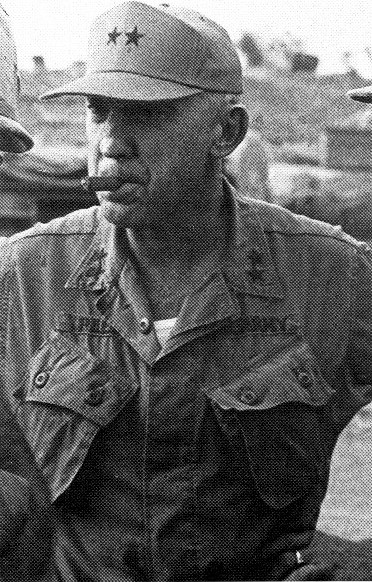
Major General William R. Peers, commander of the 4th Infantry Division and overall U.S. commander at Đắk Tô

Brigadier General Leo H. Schweiter, commander of the 173rd Airborne Brigade

By early October, U.S. intelligence reported that the North Vietnamese were withdrawing regiments from the Pleiku area to join those in Kontum Province, thereby dramatically increasing the strength of local forces to that of a full division. In response, the 4th Infantry began moving the 3rd Battalion, 12th Infantry and the 3rd Battalion, 8th Infantry into Đắk Tô to launch Operation MacArthur. On 29 October, the 4/503rd Airborne Infantry returned to the area as a reinforcement. The battalion was moved west of Đắk Tô to the Ben Het CIDG Camp to protect the construction of Fire Support Base 12 on 2 November. The PAVN's official history places the context for the PAVN/VC as a directive from the General Staff for battlefields groups increase operations to allow local forces and units to preserve strength, and for battlefields groups to conduct exercises and gain experience.

On 3 November, Sergeant Vu Hong, an artillery specialist with the PAVN 6th Regiment, defected to the South Vietnamese and was able to provide U.S. forces with detailed information on the disposition of PAVN forces and their objectives, both at Đắk Tô and at Ben Het, 18 kilometers to the west. The PAVN had fed approximately 6,000 troops into the area, most of which made up the 1st Division. The 66th Regiment was southwest of Đắk Tô preparing to launch the main attack, while the 32nd Regiment was moved south to prevent any counterattacks against the 66th. The independent 24th Regiment held positions northeast of Đắk Tô to prevent reinforcement of the base from that direction. The 174th Regiment was northwest of Đắk Tô, acting as a reserve or an offensive force as the situation dictated. In addition, the 1st Division was supported by the 40th Artillery Regiment. The goal of these units was the taking of Đắk Tô and the destruction of a brigade-size American unit.

The PAVN actions around Đắk Tô were part of an overall strategy devised by the Hanoi leadership, primarily that of General Nguyen Chi Thanh. The goal of operations in the area, according to a captured document from the B-3 Front Command, was "to annihilate a major U.S. element in order to force the enemy to deploy as many additional troops to the Central Highlands as possible." As the Americans quickly discovered, the area had been well prepared by the PAVN. The number and elaborateness of defensive preparations found by U.S. and ARVN troops indicated that some had been prepared as much as six months in advance. As General Peers noted:

Nearly every key terrain feature was heavily fortified with elaborate bunker and trench complexes. He had moved quantities of supplies and ammunition into the area. He was prepared to stay.

After contact with the PAVN forces on the 4th and 5th, Schweiter received orders to move the rest of his brigade back to Đắk Tô. Their immediate goal was first to establish a base of operations and bolster the defenses at Ben Het. They would then begin to search for the headquarters of the 66th Regiment, which U.S. intelligence believed to be in the valley stretching south of FSB 12. Simultaneously, most of the remaining elements of the 4th Infantry Division moved into the area around Đắk Tô. They were joined by two 1st Cavalry battalions (the 1/12th and 2/8th Cavalry) and ARVN forces consisting of the four battalions of the 42nd Regiment and the 2nd and 3rd Airborne Battalions. By this time, the village and airstrip had become a major logistical base, supporting an entire U.S. division and airborne brigade and six ARVN battalions. The stage was set for a major pitched battle.

== Battle ==
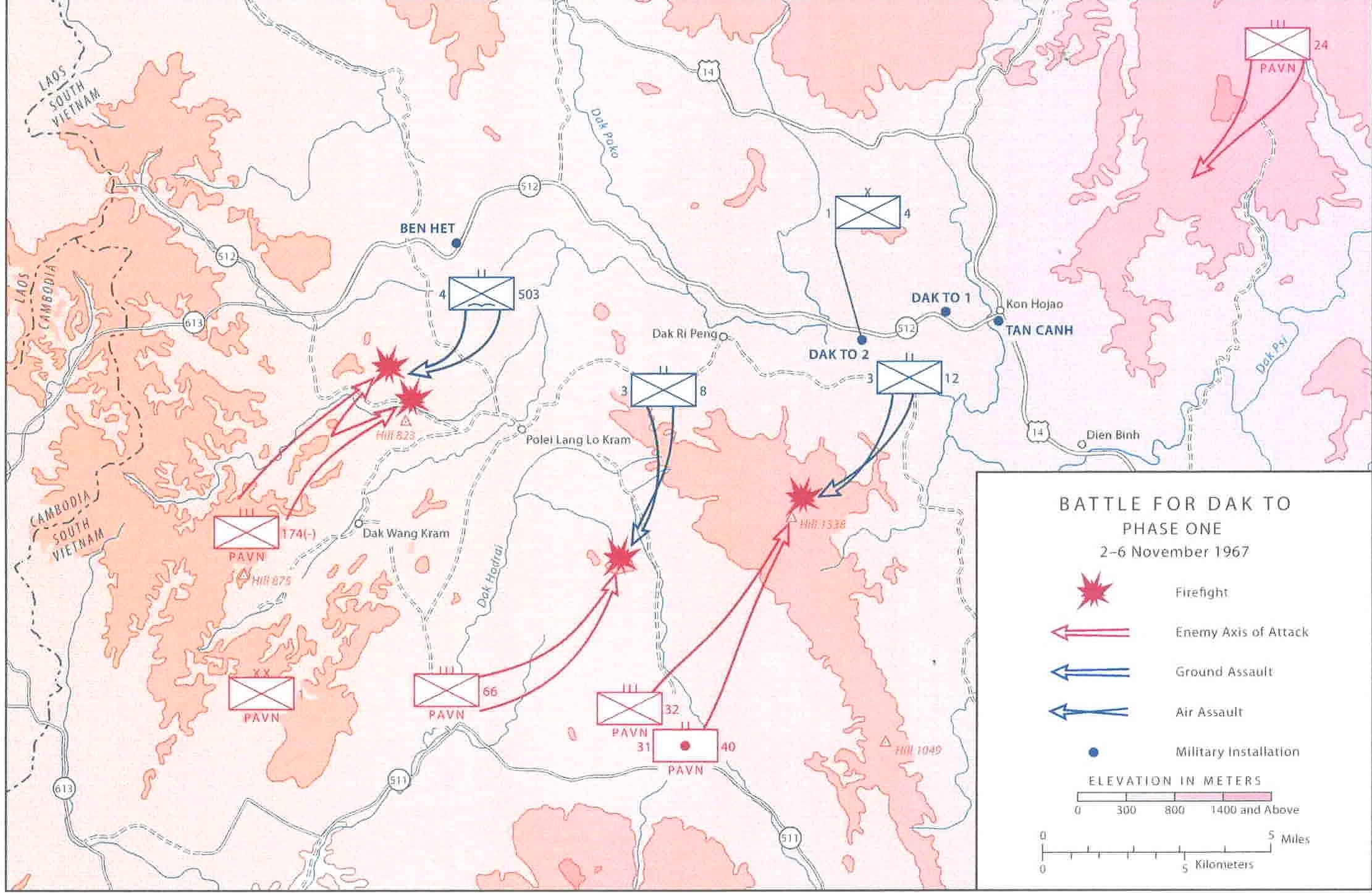
Phase one, 2–6 November 1967

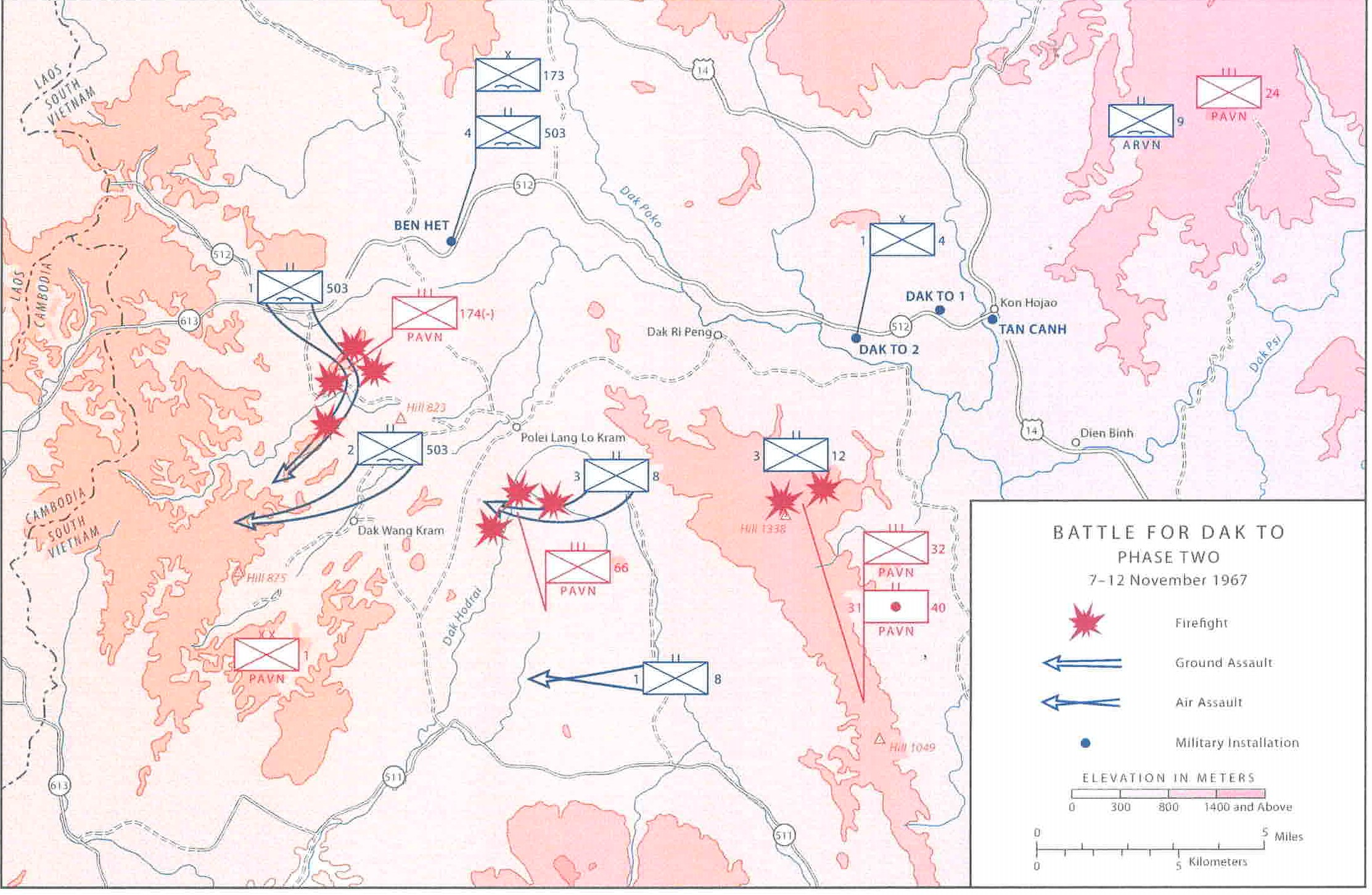
Phase two 7–12 November 1967

The first fighting of the new operation erupted on November 3rd 1967 when companies of the 4th Infantry came across PAVN defensive positions. The next day the same thing occurred to elements of the 173rd. The American and ARVN troops soon applied a methodical approach to combat in the highlands. They combed the hills on foot, ran into fixed PAVN hill-top defensive positions, applied massive firepower, and then launched ground attacks to force the PAVN off. In all of these instances, PAVN troops fought stubbornly, inflicted casualties on the Americans, and then withdrew.

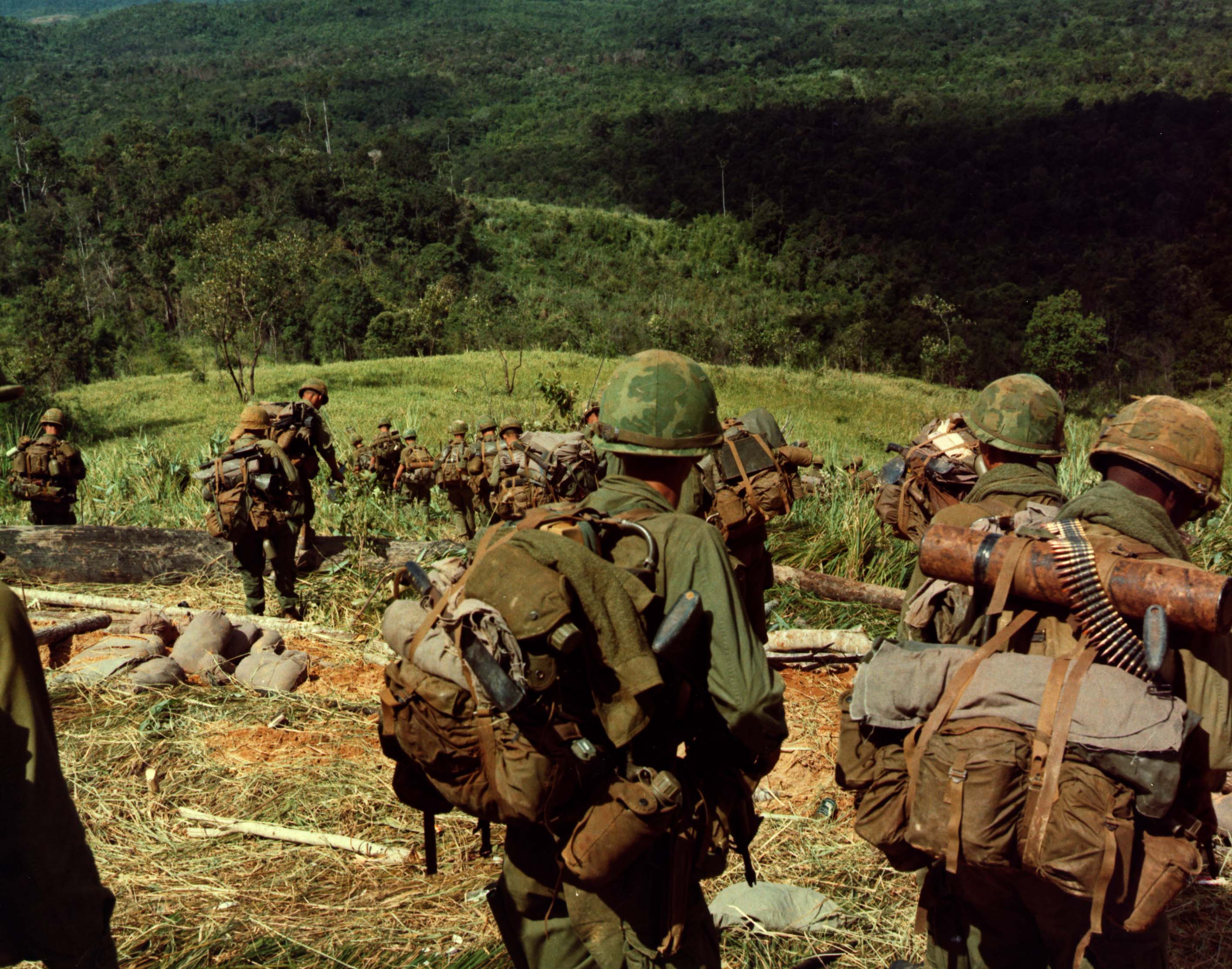
Members of Company C, 1st Battalion, 8th Infantry descend the side of Hill 742, located five miles northwest of Dak To. 14–17 November 1967

To expand the coverage of supporting artillery fire, the 4/503rd Airborne Infantry was ordered to occupy Hill 823 (14.626°N 107.648°E), south of Ben Het, for the construction of Fire Support Base 15. Since the rest of the battalion's companies were already deployed elsewhere, the 120 men of Company B would combat assault onto the hilltop by helicopter alone. After several attempts to denude the hilltop with airstrikes and artillery fire, Company B landed unopposed that afternoon, but the hill was not unoccupied. Fifteen minutes later, contact was made with the PAVN. The battle that ensued raged at close quarters until early the following morning when elements of the 66th Regiment withdrew, leaving behind more than 100 bodies. Nine men of Company B were killed and another 28 were wounded.

The following morning Company B was relieved by Lt. Col. David J. Schumacher's 1/503rd, which (against the admonitions of Colonel Livsey) was divided into two small Task Forces. Task Force Black consisted of Company C supported by two platoons of Company D and Task Force Blue which was composed of Company A and the remaining platoon of Company D. Task Force Black left Hill 823 to find the PAVN who had attacked Company B, 4/503rd. At 08:28 on 11 November, after leaving their overnight laager and following a PAVN communications wire, the force was ambushed by the 8th and 9th Battalions of the 66th Regiment and had to fight for its life. Task Force Blue and Company C, 4/503rd was sent to relieve the beleaguered Task Force Black. They encountered fire from all sides during the relief attempt, but they made it, reaching the trapped men at 15:37. U.S. losses were 20 killed, 154 wounded, and two missing.

The commanding officer of Task Force Black, Captain Thomas McElwain, reported a PAVN body count of 80, but was commanded by Schumacher (whose conduct of the action later came under severe criticism) to go out and count again. He then reported back that 175 PAVN soldiers had been killed. He later stated that "If you lost so many people killed and wounded, you had to have something to show for it." McElwain and Schumacher later clashed over McElwain's recommendation for a decoration for Private First Class John Andrew Barnes, III, who had leapt on a grenade and sacrificed his life to save wounded comrades during the action. Schumacher refused to endorse the recommendation, stating that he did not think medals were for "men who committed suicide." Barnes was later awarded the Medal of Honor.

The PAVN claim that during the battle against the 1/503rd from 8 to 11 November, they lost 32 killed or wounded.

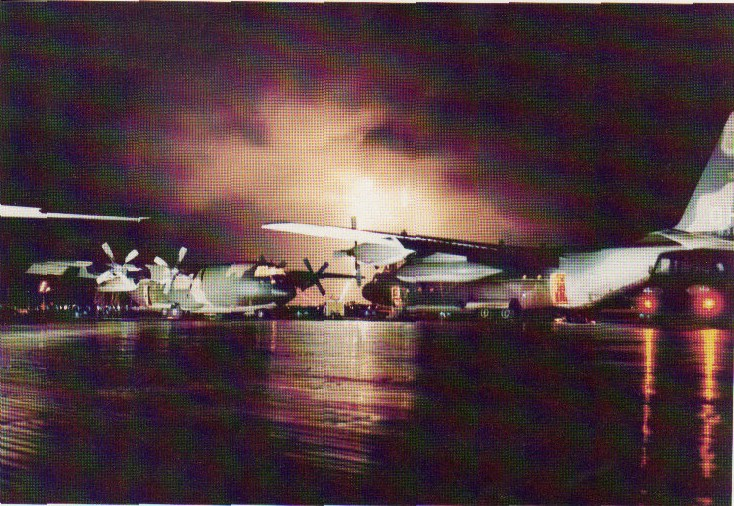
The build-up at Đắk Tô

The PAVN simultaneously attacked the three companies of the 3/8th Infantry on Hill 724 (14.593°N 107.691°E). Beginning at 13:07 and lasting for thirty minutes, a mortar barrage rained onto the battalion's laager site. PAVN troops then charged out of the jungle to the attack. By the time the action ended at 19:03, 18 Americans were dead and another 118 were wounded. The 4th Infantry claimed that 92 PAVN had died in the clash.

An Associated Press article from 12 November quoted the PAVN death toll to have risen above 500 with 67 US troops having also died.

On the night of 12 November, the PAVN launched the first of many rocket attacks against the Đắk Tô airfield, firing 44 missiles. By 08:00 on 15 November, three C-130 Hercules transport aircraft were in the turnaround area as a PAVN mortar barrage landed. Two of them were destroyed. The resulting fires and additional incoming mortars set the ammunition dump and fuel storage areas ablaze. Explosions continued all day and into the night. During that night's incoming shelling, a mortar round landed on two steel containers of C-4 plastic explosive. They detonated simultaneously, sending a fireball and mushroom cloud high above the valley and leaving two craters 40-foot (12 m) deep. This was said to be the largest explosion to occur in the Vietnam War, knocking men off their feet over a mile away. The explosion destroyed the entire 15th Light Equipment Company compound next to the ammunition dump although no one was killed. Engineer Lieutenant Fred Dyerson thought "it looked like Charlie had gotten hold of some nuclear weapons." Although more than 1,100 tons of ordnance were destroyed during the explosions and fires, this was as close as the PAVN would get to taking Đắk Tô. The rapid deployment of allied forces had upset the North Vietnamese offensive and had thrown them onto the defensive. Previous actions had battered the 66th and 33rd Regiments, and they began a southwesterly retreat, covered by the 174th Regiment. The Americans and the ARVN then began to run into tenacious rearguard actions.

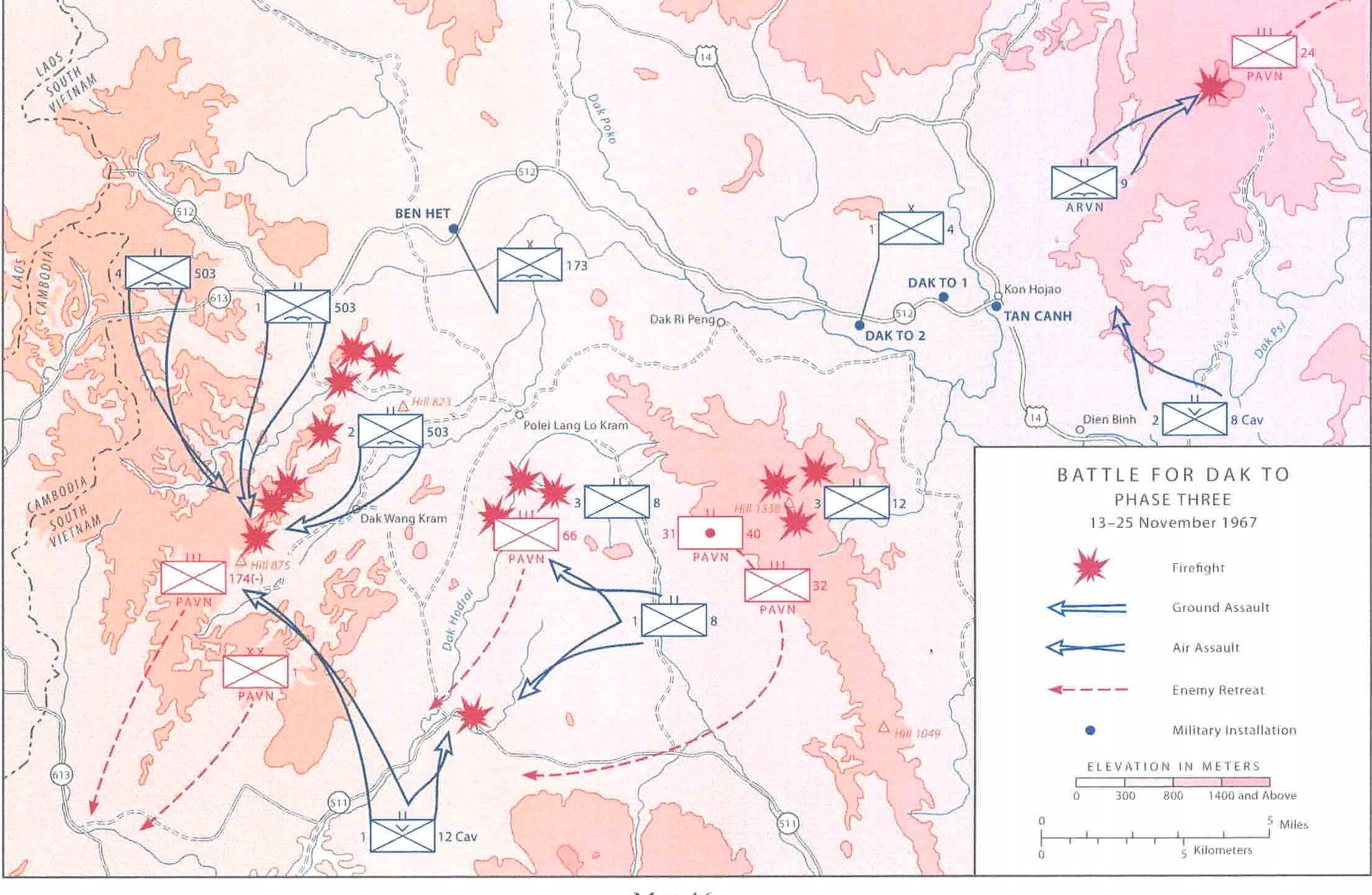
Phase three, 13–25 November 1967

To prevent a repetition of the artillery attack against its base camp, the 3/12th Infantry was ordered to take Hill 1338, which had an excellent overview of Đắk Tô, only six kilometers away. For two days, the Americans fought their way up the steep slope of the hill and into the most elaborate bunker complex yet discovered, all of the fortifications of which were connected by field telephones.

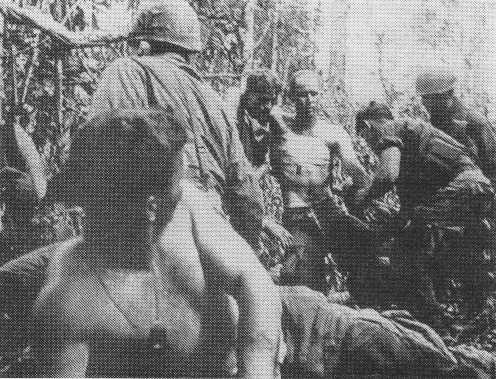
U.S. wounded being moved to an aid station during battle for Hill 882

After scouring the area of the PAVN who attacked Task Force Black, the three companies of 1/503rd moved southwest to occupy Hill 882. The force was accompanied by approximately a dozen civilian news correspondents. On the morning of 15 November, the lead company crested the hill and discovered bunkers connected by telephone wire. They were then attacked, and the rest of the Americans rushed to the hilltop to take defensive positions. PAVN troops poured small arms, machine gun, and mortar fire on the Americans and launched several ground attacks. The U.S. commander requested helicopter evacuation for the most seriously wounded, but this request was denied by Col. Schumacher, who demanded that the civilians be evacuated first. When the fighting ceased on 19 November the U.S. battalion had suffered seven killed and 34 wounded. The PAVN 66th Regiment left behind 51 dead.

While the action on Hill 882 was underway, Company D, 4/503rd was conducting road clearing operations around Ben Het while being accompanied by a CIDG Mike Force. While calling in an artillery fire mission, an error caused two rounds to fall on the company's position. Six Americans and three CIDG were killed outright and 15 paratroopers and 13 CIDG troops were wounded in the friendly fire incident.

ARVN units had also found plenty of action in the Đắk Tô area. On 18 November, on Hill 1416 (14.738°N 107.908°E) northeast of Tan Canh, the ARVN 3/42nd Infantry found the PAVN 24th Regiment in well-fortified defensive positions. The elite, all-volunteer ARVN 3rd and 9th Airborne Battalions joined the action, attacking the hill from another direction. The ARVN forces took the hill on 20 November after vicious close-quarters fighting that claimed 66 ARVN dead and another 290 wounded. The PAVN left behind 248 of their own.

U.S. intelligence indicated that the fresh 174th PAVN Regiment had slipped westward past Ben Het and had taken up positions on an 875-meter-high hill just six kilometers from the border. The 174th had done so in order to cover the withdrawal of the 66th and 32nd Regiments, which were moving toward their sanctuaries across the Cambodian frontier. On 19 November, BG Schweiter was informed that a Special Forces Mobile Strike Force company had run into heavy resistance while reconnoitering the area. He then ordered his 2nd Battalion to take the hill.

=== Hill 875 ===
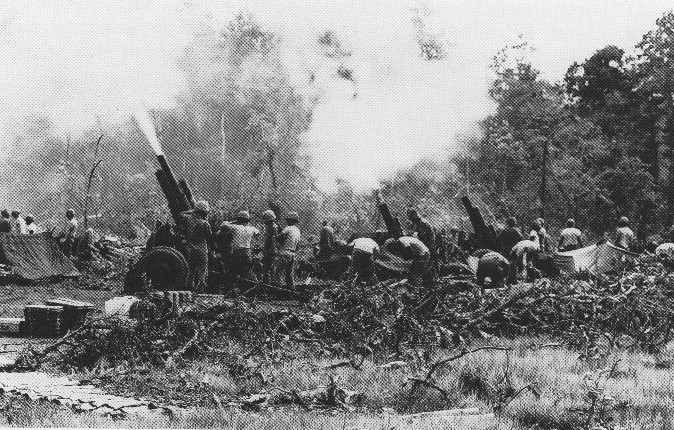
U.S. 105 mm artillery battery in action in the Central Highlands

At 09:43 on 19 November, the three companies (330 men) of 2/503rd moved into jumpoff positions from which to assault Hill 875 (14.579°N 107.595°E). Companies C and D moved up the slope followed by two platoons of Company A in the classic "two up one back" formation utilized since World War I. The Weapons Platoon of Company A remained behind at the bottom of the hill to cut out a landing zone. Instead of a frontal assault with massed troops, the unit would have been better served by advancing small teams to envelop possible PAVN positions and then calling in air and artillery support.

At 10:30, as the Americans moved to within 300 meters of the crest, PAVN machine gunners opened fire on the advancing paratroopers. Then B-40 rockets and 57mm recoilless rifle fire were unleashed upon them. The paratroopers attempted to continue the advance, but the PAVN, well concealed in interconnected bunkers and trenches, opened fire with small arms and grenades. The American advance was halted and the men went to ground, finding whatever cover they could. At 14:30 PAVN troops hidden at the bottom of the hill launched a massed assault on Company A. Unknown to the Americans, they had walked into a carefully prepared ambush by the 2nd Battalion of the 174th Regiment.

The men of Company A retreated up the slope, lest they be cut off from their comrades and annihilated. They were closely followed by the PAVN. Private First Class Carlos Lozada held the rear guard position for Company A with his M60 machine gun. As the PAVN advanced, Lozada mowed them down and refused to retreat until he was shot dead. For his actions that day, Lozada was awarded a posthumous Medal of Honor. Soon, U.S. air strikes and artillery fire were being called in, but they had little effect on the battle because of the dense foliage on the hillside. Resupply became a necessity because of high ammunition expenditures and lack of water, but it was also an impossibility. Six UH-1 helicopters were shot down or badly damaged that afternoon trying to get to 2/503rd.

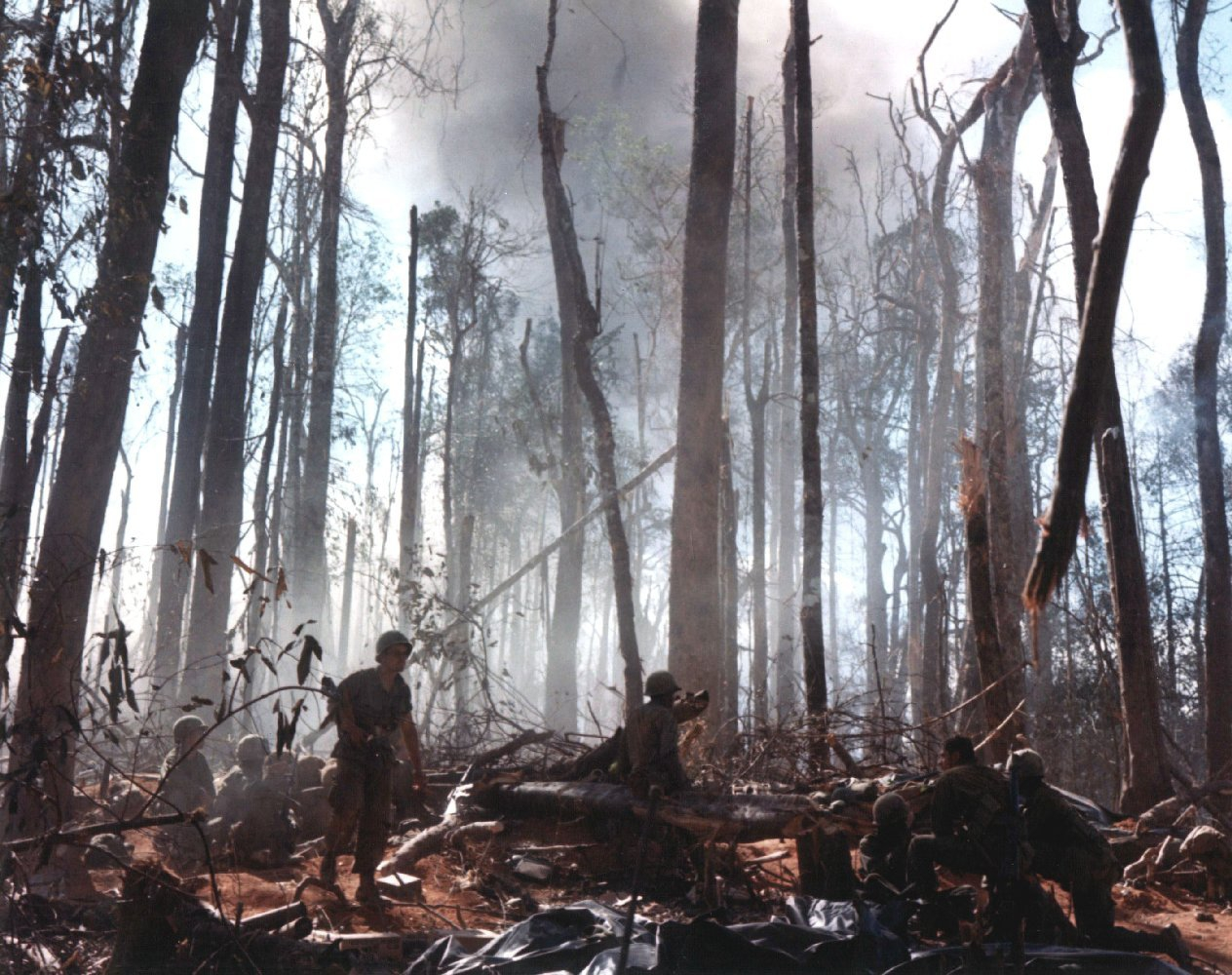
U.S. troops in combat on Hill 875

At 18:58 one of the worst friendly fire incidents of the Vietnam War occurred when a Marine Corps A-4 Skyhawk fighter-bomber, flown by LTC Richard Taber, the Commanding Officer of a Marine Air Group from Chu Lai Air Base, dropped two 250-pound Mark 81 Snakeye bombs into 2/503rd's perimeter. One of the bombs exploded, a tree burst above the center of the position, where the combined command groups, the wounded, and the medics were all located. It killed 42 men outright and wounded 45 more, including the overall on-scene commander, Captain Harold Kaufman. 1Lt. Bartholomew O'Leary, Company D Commander, was seriously wounded. (Company A's commander had been killed in the retreat up the slope). Chaplain (Major) Charles J. Watters, was killed in the blast while ministering to the wounded. For his gallantry in repeatedly exposing himself to enemy fire to retrieve the wounded on Hill 875, he was awarded a posthumous Medal of Honor.

The next morning, the three companies of 4/503rd were chosen to set out and relieve the men on Hill 875. Because of intense PAVN sniper and mortar fire (and the terrain) it took until nightfall for the relief force to reach the beleaguered battalion. On the afternoon of 21 November, both battalions moved out to take the crest. During fierce, close-quarters fighting, some of the paratroopers made it into the PAVN trenchline but were ordered to pull back as darkness fell. At approximately 23:00, the 4th Division's 1/12th Infantry was ordered to withdraw from an offensive operations in the southern Central Highlands and redeploy to Đắk Tô. In a night-time air redeployment, the entire battalion redeployed and took up positions around the main fire support base at Đắk Tô in less than 12 hours.

The following day was spent in launching airstrikes and a heavy artillery bombardment against the hilltop, totally denuding it of cover. On 23 November, the 2nd and 4th Battalions of the 503rd were ordered to renew their assault while the 1/12th Infantry assaulted 875 from the south. This time the Americans gained the crest, but the PAVN had already abandoned their positions, leaving only a few dozen charred bodies and weapons.

The battle of Hill 875 had cost 2/503rd 87 killed, 130 wounded, and three missing. 4/503rd suffered 28 killed 123 wounded, and four missing. Combined with noncombatant losses, this represented one-fifth of the 173rd Airborne Brigade's total strength. For its combined actions during operations around Đắk Tô, the 173rd Airborne Brigade was awarded the Presidential Unit Citation.

== Aftermath ==
By the end of November, the PAVN withdrew back into their sanctuaries in Cambodia and Laos, failing to wipe out a major American unit, yet forcing the U.S. Army to pay a high price. 376 U.S. troops had been killed or listed as missing-presumed dead and another 1,441 were wounded, in the fighting around Đắk Tô. The fighting had also taken a toll on the ARVN with 73 soldiers killed. U.S. munitions expenditures attested to the ferocity of the fighting: 151,000 artillery rounds, 2,096 tactical air sorties, 257 B-52 strikes. 2,101 Army helicopter sorties were flown, and 40 helicopters were lost. The U.S. Army claimed that 1,644 PAVN troops had been killed by body count, but this figure quickly became a source of contention due to allegations of body count inflation. During the battle, one company commander alleges after losing 78 men while finding 10 enemy bodies, the "enemy body count" figures were deliberately re-written as 475 by General William Westmoreland and released as official operational reports.

Another figure of some significant contention was the claim from the Vietnam News Agency quoted in an Associated Press report that 2,800 U.S. soldiers and 700 ARVN had perished in the fighting.

In his memoirs, General William C. Westmoreland, U.S. commander in Vietnam, mentioned 1,400 PAVN casualties, while MG William B. Rosson, the MACV deputy commander, estimated that the PAVN lost between 1,000 and 1,400 men. Not all American commanders were happy with the friendly to enemy loss ratio. U.S. Marine Corps General John Chaisson questioned "Is it a victory when you lose 362 friendlies in three weeks and by your own spurious body count you only get 1,200?" Major General Charles P. Stone, who succeeded Peers as commander of the 4th Infantry Division on 4 January 1968, later described the methods that U.S. commanders had previously used in the highlands as "stupid." Stone was particularly critical of Schweiter and his performance at Dak To. "I had the damnest time (after my arrival in Vietnam) getting anybody to show me where Hill 875 was," he told interviewers following the war. "It had absolutely no importance in the war thereafter. None. It had no strategic value... It made no difference... that the enemy held all those mountains along the border because they controlled no people, no resources, no real growing areas and suffered a horrible malaria rate. Why... go out there and fight them where all the advantages were on... [their] side."

Exhausted soldiers of the 173rd Airborne after campaigning in the Central Highlands

MACV asserted that three of the four PAVN regiments that participated in the fighting had been so battered that they played no part in the next phase of their winter-spring offensive. Only the 24th Regiment took the field during the Tet Offensive of January 1968. The 173rd Airborne Brigade and two battalions of the 4th Infantry Division were in no better shape. Westmoreland claimed that "we had soundly defeated the enemy without unduly sacrificing operations in other areas. The enemy's return was nil." But Westmoreland's claim may have missed the point. The border battles fought that fall and winter had indeed cost the PAVN dearly, but they had achieved their objective. By January 1968, one-half of all U.S. maneuver battalions in South Vietnam had been drawn away from the cities and lowlands and into the border areas. The official, post-war, PAVN history is more sanguine, viewing their results as the infliction of casualties on a brigade, two battalions and six companies of US forces.

Operations in and around the Central Highlands including previous battles at Hill 1338 had rendered the 173rd Airborne combat ineffective, and they were ordered to Tuy Hòa to repair and refit. The 173rd was transferred to Camp Radcliff in An Khê and Bong Son areas during 1968, seeing very little action while the combat ineffective elements of the brigade were rebuilt.

Several members of Westmoreland's staff began to see an eerie resemblance to the Viet Minh campaign of 1953, when seemingly peripheral actions had led up to the climactic Battle of Dien Bien Phu. General Giap even laid claim to such a strategy in an announcement in September, but to the Americans it all seemed a bit too contrived. Yet, no understandable analysis seemed to explain Hanoi's almost suicidal military actions. They could only be explained if a situation akin to Dien Bien Phu came into being. Then, almost overnight, one emerged. In the western corner of Quảng Trị Province, an isolated Marine outpost at Khe Sanh, came under siege by PAVN forces that would eventually number three divisions.

Three members of the 173rd Airborne Brigade (Major Charles J. Watters, Pfc. John A. Barnes III and Pfc. Carlos Lozada) all posthumously received the Medal of Honor for their actions during the battle.

== Bibliography ==
Published government documents

- Brewer, Maj. Robert R. and Sp5 Roger E. Hester, Vietnam: The Third Year – 173rd Airborne Brigade. Japan, 1968.

Memoirs

- Ketwig, John, "...and a hard rain fell: A GI's True Story of the War in Vietnam". Illinois: Sourcebooks, Inc, 2002.
- Clodfelter, Micheal., "Mad Minutes and Vietnam Months". McFarland, 1988
- Arthurs, Ted G., "LAND WITH NO SUN: A Year in Vietnam With the 173rd Airborne (Stackpole Military History Series)". Stackpole Books, 2006.

Secondary sources

- Garland, Albert N., A Distant Challenge: The U.S. Infantryman in Vietnam, 1967–1972. Nashville TN: The Battery Press, 1983.
- Maitland, Terrence, Peter McInerney, et al., A Contagion of War. Boston: Boston Publishing Company, 1983.

Further reading

- Cash, John A.; Albright, John; Sandstrum, Allan W. (1985). "5. Three Companies at Dak To". Seven Firefights in Vietnam. Washington, D.C.: United States Army Center of Military History. Archived from the original on 5 November 2013.
- Okendo, Lawrence D. (1988). Sky soldier : battles of Dak-To. [S.l.]: L.D. Okendo. ISBN 0962033308.
- Carat, Paul (2011). Pris en otage par les Viet-cong : journal de captivité d'un missionnaire durant les combats de Dak-Tô : extraits du carnet de note de l'année 1972 de Paul Carat, prêtre des missions étrangères de Paris (in French). Valence: Peuple libre. ISBN 9782907655644.
