= Landing Zone Brillo Pad =

Site information
- Type: Army Base

Location
- Coordinates: 14.3286°N 107.742°E

Site history
- Built: 1968
- In use: 1968-9
- Battles/wars: Vietnam War

Garrison information
- Occupants: 4th Infantry Division

Landing Zone Brillo Pad (also known as LZ Brillo Pad) is a former U.S. Army base west of Kontum in the Central Highlands of Vietnam.

== History ==
The base was first established in 1968 approximately 28 km west of Kontum and 36 km southwest of Đắk Tô.

The base was occupied by the 1st Battalion, 14th Infantry.

On 16 May 1968 People's Army of Vietnam (PAVN) forces attacked an 11-man Long-range reconnaissance patrol observation post approximately 1 km from Brillo Pad. Three U.S. soldiers were killed, including Sergeant Anund C. Roark who would be posthumously awarded the Medal of Honor for his actions. On the same day a 122mm rocket killed one U.S. soldier at Brillo Pad.

Starting on 26 May 1968 the base was hit by PAVN mortar and rocket fire over a four-day period killing 12 U.S. and wounded 41, this was followed by a ground assault, resulting in 41 PAVN killed.

The base was abandoned by U.S. forces in early 1969.

== Current use ==
The base is abandoned and largely turned over to housing and farmland.
