= Leo H. Schweiter =

United States Army general (1917–1972)

Leo Henry Schweiter
- BG Schweiter in 1967
- Born: April 16, 1917; Wichita, Kansas, U.S.
- Died: August 23, 1972 (aged 55); Carlisle Barracks, Pennsylvania, U.S.
- Burial place: Arlington National Cemetery
- Spouse: Virginia Van Pflaum (m. 1954)
- Children: 4
- Military career
- Allegiance: United States of America
- Branch: United States Army
- Service years: 1938–1972
- Rank: Major General
- Commands: 173rd Airborne Brigade
- Conflicts: World War II; Normandy airborne landings; Operation Market Garden; Siege of Bastogne; Korean War; Battle of Inchon; Blockade of Wonsan; Vietnam War; Operation Bolling; Battle of Dak To
- Awards: Distinguished Service Medal; Silver Star; Distinguished Flying Cross; Bronze Star

Leo Henry Schweiter (April 16, 1917 – August 23, 1972) was a United States Army Major General who served as commander of the 173rd Airborne Brigade during the Vietnam War.

== Early life and education ==
He attended Kansas State College.

== Military service ==
=== World War II ===
He enlisted in the United States Army Air Corps in 1941. He then transferred to the 101st Airborne Division and while serving as a Captain and assistant G-2 (Intelligence Officer) took part in the Normandy airborne landings on 6 June 1944. He was knocked unconscious by a German grenade blast and captured, but was released the following day when the Germans withdrew. He later took part in Operation Market Garden and the Siege of Bastogne. In late January 1945, as the Germans launched a counterattack at Haguenau Major Schweiter stated "What the hell are you so worried about? The 101st alone can lick five German divisions simultaneously. We just did."

=== Korean War ===
He served in the 7th Infantry Division and took part in the Battle of Inchon and the later landings at Wonsan. He was given command the 32nd Infantry Regiment.

=== Post Korean War ===
In 1959 he was named chief of staff of the 8th Infantry Division.

He later was assistant chief of staff, G2, headquarters, XVIII Airborne Corps.

Col. Schweiter served as the first commanding officer of the 5th Special Forces Group from September 1961 to July 1962.

From 1962 to 1964 he served in the office of special assistant for counterinsurgency and special activities for the Joint Chiefs of Staff.

He served as assistant division commander of the 101st Airborne Division at Fort Campbell.

=== Vietnam War ===
On 23 August 1967 BG Schweiter took command of the 173rd Airborne Brigade.

BG Schweiter led the Brigade in the costly Battle of Dak To in November 1967, following which it was withdrawn to lower intensity areas, while its constituent units were rebuilt. The Brigade returned to participate in Operation Bolling in December 1967. Schweiter handed over command of the Brigade to BG Richard J. Allen on 20 March 1968.

He served as chief of staff United States Army Vietnam until May 1972.

== Later life ==
He retired from the Army due to ill health in May 1972 and died at Dunham Army Hospital, Carlisle Barracks, Pennsylvania on 23 August 1972.

== Personal life ==
He married his wife, Virginia Van Pflaum, on July 24, 1954. They had three daughters and a son.
