= John R. Deane Jr. =

United States Army general

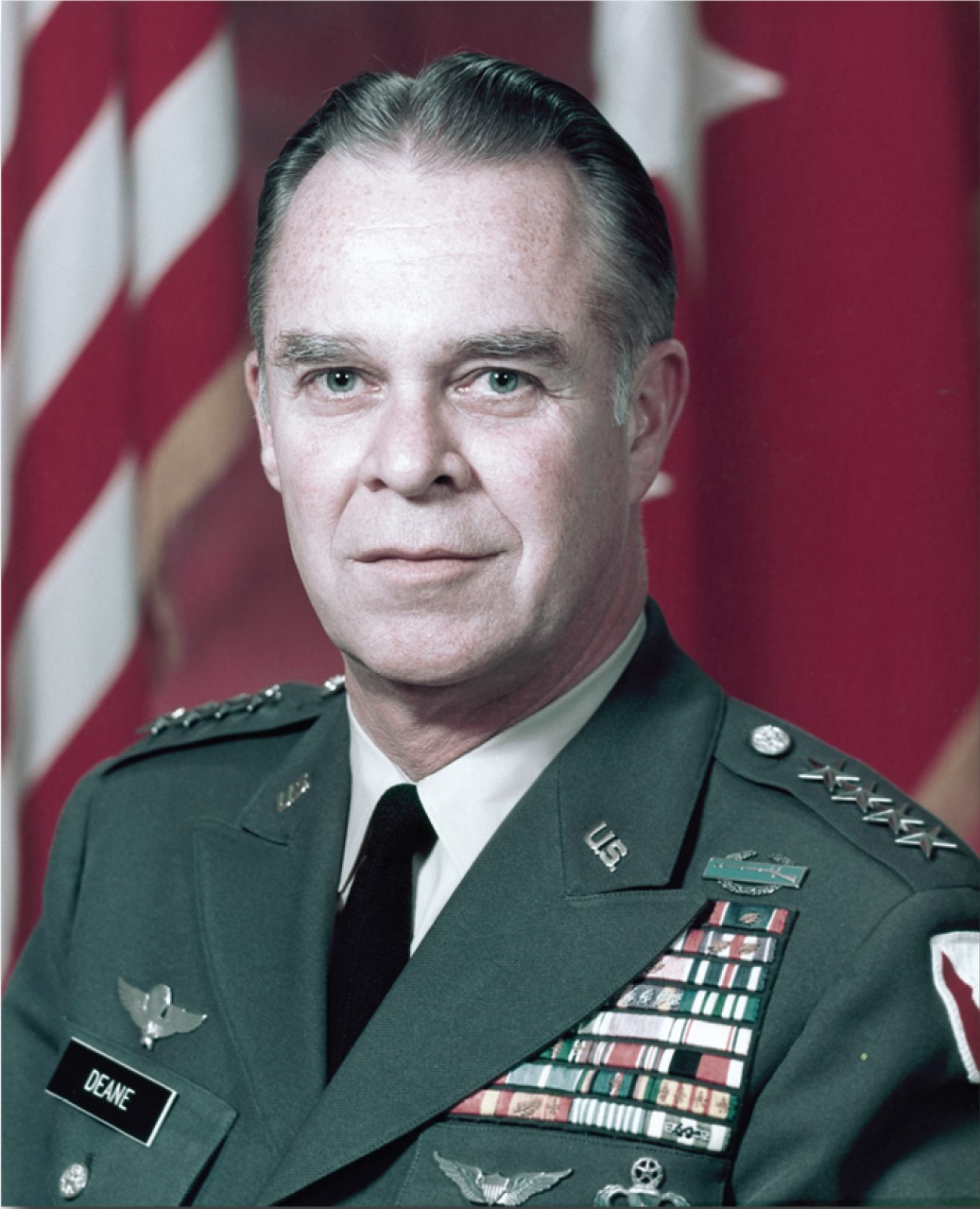
- General John R. Deane Jr.
- Born: June 8, 1919; San Francisco, California, U.S.
- Died: July 18, 2013 (aged 94); Bangor, Maine, U.S.
- Relatives: Major General John R. Deane (father)
- Military career
- Allegiance: United States
- Branch: United States Army
- Service years: 1942–1977
- Rank: General
- Service number: 0-24835
- Commands: United States Army Materiel Command; 82nd Airborne Division; 173rd Airborne Brigade
- Conflicts: World War II; Korean War; Vietnam War
- Awards: Distinguished Service Cross (2); Army Distinguished Service Medal (3); Silver Star (3); Legion of Merit (2); Distinguished Flying Cross; Bronze Star Medal; Purple Heart

John Russell Deane Jr. (8 June 1919 – 18 July 2013) was a highly decorated United States Army officer who rose to the rank of general and served as commander of the United States Army Materiel Command.

== Early life ==
Deane was born in San Francisco, California, as the son of career army officer, future Major general John R. Deane.

== United States Army service ==
In 1937, Deane enlisted in the 16th Infantry. After one year, he entered the United States Military Academy. Upon graduation from the academy in 1942, he joined the 104th Infantry Division as a platoon leader and, by the end of World War II, he had become a battalion commander.

Deane held the position of intelligence officer in Europe from 1945 to 1947 and then returned to Washington, D.C., to work in the Joint War Plans Division, HQDA. In 1951, he became executive assistant to the Secretary of the Army. From this post, he went to the Command and General Staff College, Fort Leavenworth, in 1952. Upon graduation, he served as chief of plans in the Military Armistice Commission until 1954.

Returning to the United States in late 1954, he attended the Armed Forces Staff College. Upon graduation, he became chief of programs and budget in the office of the chief, research and development, HQDA. From 1958 to 1959, he attended the National War College. He then became assistant to the chief of staff, United States Army Europe, Heidelberg, Germany. From February 1961 to June 1962, he was commander of the 2nd Battle Group in Berlin. In December 1962, he returned to Washington as assistant to the director of defense research and engineering, where he served as executive assistant to the assistant secretary of defense (deputy director, defense research and engineering). During this time, he attended Harvard Business School's six-week advanced management program. On 16 August 1965, he became the assistant division commander, 82nd Airborne Division, Fort Bragg, North Carolina.

Deane received the assignment of chief of staff, field forces in Vietnam in February 1966. In July 1966, he became assistant division commander, 1st Infantry Division, Vietnam. In December 1966, he was assigned as commanding general, 173rd Airborne Brigade in Vietnam. He earned two Distinguished Service Crosses in Vietnam.

From October 1967 to September 1968, Deane served as director of doctrine in the office of the assistant chief of staff for force development, United States Army. From October 1968 to July 1970, he was the commanding general of the 82nd Airborne Division, Fort Bragg, North Carolina. In July 1972, he was appointed the deputy assistant chief of staff for force development, U.S. Army, where he served until August 1972, when he became the deputy director of the Defense Intelligence Agency. He was promoted to full general and assumed command of the United States Army Materiel Development and Readiness Command on 12 February 1975. Deane retired from active service on 31 January 1977.

Deane died on 18 July 2013, in Bangor, Maine.

== Decorations ==

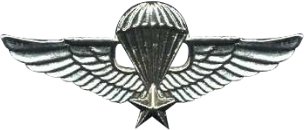
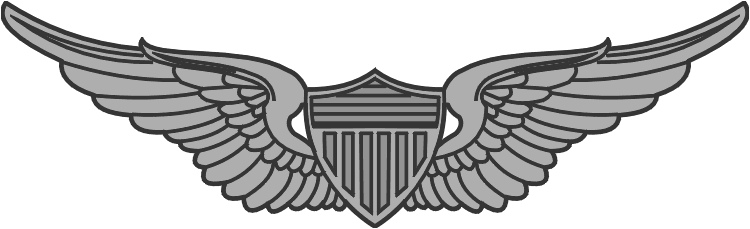

Master Parachutist Badge
Combat Infantryman Badge
| 1st Row | Distinguished Service Cross with Oak Leaf Cluster | | Army Distinguished Service Medal with two Oak Leaf Clusters | Silver Star with two Oak Leaf Clusters |
| 2nd Row | Legion of Merit with Oak Leaf Cluster | Distinguished Flying Cross | Bronze Star with "V" Device | Purple Heart |
| 3rd Row | Air Medal (25 awards) | Joint Service Commendation Medal | Army Commendation Medal | American Defense Service Medal |
| 4th Row | American Campaign Medal | European-African-Middle Eastern Campaign Medal with three service stars | World War II Victory Medal | Army of Occupation Medal |
| 5th Row | National Defense Service Medal with one service star | Korean Service Medal | Armed Forces Expeditionary Medal with one service star | Vietnam Service Medal with three service stars and Arrowhead device |
| 6th Row | National Order of Vietnam, 5th Class | Vietnam Gallantry Cross with Palm | United Nations Korea Medal | Vietnam Campaign Medal |
| Republic of Vietnam Parachutist Badge | | | Army Aviator Badge | |

== Dates of rank ==
| Insignia | Rank | Component | Date | Reference |
|---|---|---|---|---|
| | Second lieutenant | Infantry | 29 May 1942 | |
| | First lieutenant | Army of the United States | 19 November 1942 | |
| | Captain | Army of the United States | 14 July 1943 | |
| | Major | Army of the United States | 22 May 1944 | |
| | Lieutenant colonel | Army of the United States | 12 April 1945 | |
| | First lieutenant | Infantry | 29 May 1945 | |
| | Captain | Infantry | 1 July 1948 | |
| | Major | Infantry | 6 July 1954 | |
| | Lieutenant colonel | Infantry | 29 May 1962 | |
| | Colonel | Infantry (temporary) | 6 December 1955 | |
| | Brigadier general | Regular Army | 1 August 1965 | |
| | Colonel | Infantry | 29 May 1967 | |
| | Major general | Regular Army | 1 November 1967 | |
| | Brigadier general | Regular Army | 20 November 1968 | |
| | Major general | Regular Army | 30 June 1948 | |
| | Lieutenant general | Regular Army | 22 September 1972 | |
| | General | Regular Army | 12 February 1975 | |
