= Charles P. Stone =

United States Army general (1915–2012)

- Born: 17 June 1915
- Died: 6 February 2012 (aged 96)
- Burial place: Arlington National Cemetery
- Military career
- Allegiance: United States
- Branch: United States Army
- Service years: 1937–1972
- Rank: Major general
- Commands: 4th Infantry Division
- Conflicts: World War II; Vietnam War

Charles Peter Stone (June 17, 1915 – February 6, 2012), was a career United States Army officer during the middle of the 20th century. After serving in World War II, in 1968 Major General Stone commanded the U.S. Army's 4th Infantry Division in Vietnam, leading his division to success during the Tet Offensive.

== Early life ==
Stone grew up in Queens, New York and he attended the City College of New York.

== Military career ==
He joined the Reserve Officers Training Corps (ROTC) and then competed for a Regular Army commission under the federal Thomason Act. This legislation enabled a thousand top ROTC graduates to compete for 50 commissions during a year of active duty. For 1937-38, 41 were selected, including Stone.

He served in North Africa and Sicily in World War II.

=== Vietnam War ===
==== High self-regard ====
Stone was known for high self-regard. "I suppose I'm probably the most confident commander in Vietnam, but I think in the Highlands we are beating the hell out of the enemy," he told a war correspondent in 1968. He also said later,"I was the best division commander in Vietnam."

His division had a three-week advance notice of the Tet Offensive attacks thanks to its capture in early January 1968 of "a five-page plan of movement and attack for Pleiku Province." Units were placed on alert and tanks in Pleiku were positioned "as a reaction force against the invaders." Stone also briefed American officers and the area Vietnamese commander before the North Vietnamese attack. During the Tet Offensive, according to one account, "the highest kill ratio registered was in the three highland provinces of the Cambodian border . . . where the enemy lost nearly 3000 troops, the United States fewer than fifty, and the ARVN [Army of the Republic of Vietnam] about 145." Stone's division operated in these provinces. Before departing his command of the 4th Infantry Division, he had a caustic farewell message printed in Vietnamese on leaflets and air-dropped to enemy troops. The message read, in part: "I also take with me sad memories. I recall seeing thousands of North Vietnamese sent to their death by the stupid tactics of your leaders . . . If your leaders continue their wasteful practice and stupid tactics, my successor will also have a successful tour . . ."

==== "Salute or shoot" ====
Despite his combat successes, Stone's tour in Vietnam was marred by controversy over his order that soldiers at the division base camp cited for failing to salute "will be immediately transferred to the forward area." The order had taken effect after Stone had assumed command of the 4th Division in January 1968, but only appeared in print in September in a daily divisional bulletin. The order garnered media attention in America and Stone said in an interview the Defense Department told him "the country is aroused over your saluting policy" so he withdrew it. According to The New York Times, Stone "said he had also rescinded similar orders that sent to forward areas soldiers who had their driver's licenses revoked or who violated off-limits and curfew regulations." The general also noted, with apparent bitterness, that unlike in World War II, where soldiers could be sent to a distinct front, "Here the front is all around us. Where is the front? There is no front."

In retirement, Stone said the Pentagon should have addressed "the basic misconception" in the controversy. As he put it, (as a division commander) "Stone is responsible for the lives of 22,000 men, twenty-four hours a day. . . . Permissiveness in the army, much less insolence and recalcitrance, cannot be tolerated. The military virtues are obedience and discipline at all times so that they can be counted on when absolutely necessary for the security of army units and the success of their missions."

== Personal life and retirement ==
He was married and had a daughter. He was an active outdoorsman and spent most of his retirement on a farm in Mathews, Virginia.
