= Đăk Tô =

Đăk Tô Xã Đăk Tô
- Commune
- Đăk Tô commune
- Location within Vietnam
- Coordinates: 14°39′39″N 107°50′19″E
- Country: Vietnam
- Region: Central Highlands
- Province: Quảng Ngãi
- Time zone: UTC+7 (UTC + 7)

Đăk Tô is a commune (xã) of Quảng Ngãi Province, Vietnam. A battle during the Vietnam War occurred nearby, known for being one of the bloodiest of the war.
