= Operation Francis Marion =

Part of the Vietnam War (1967)

- Part of Vietnam War
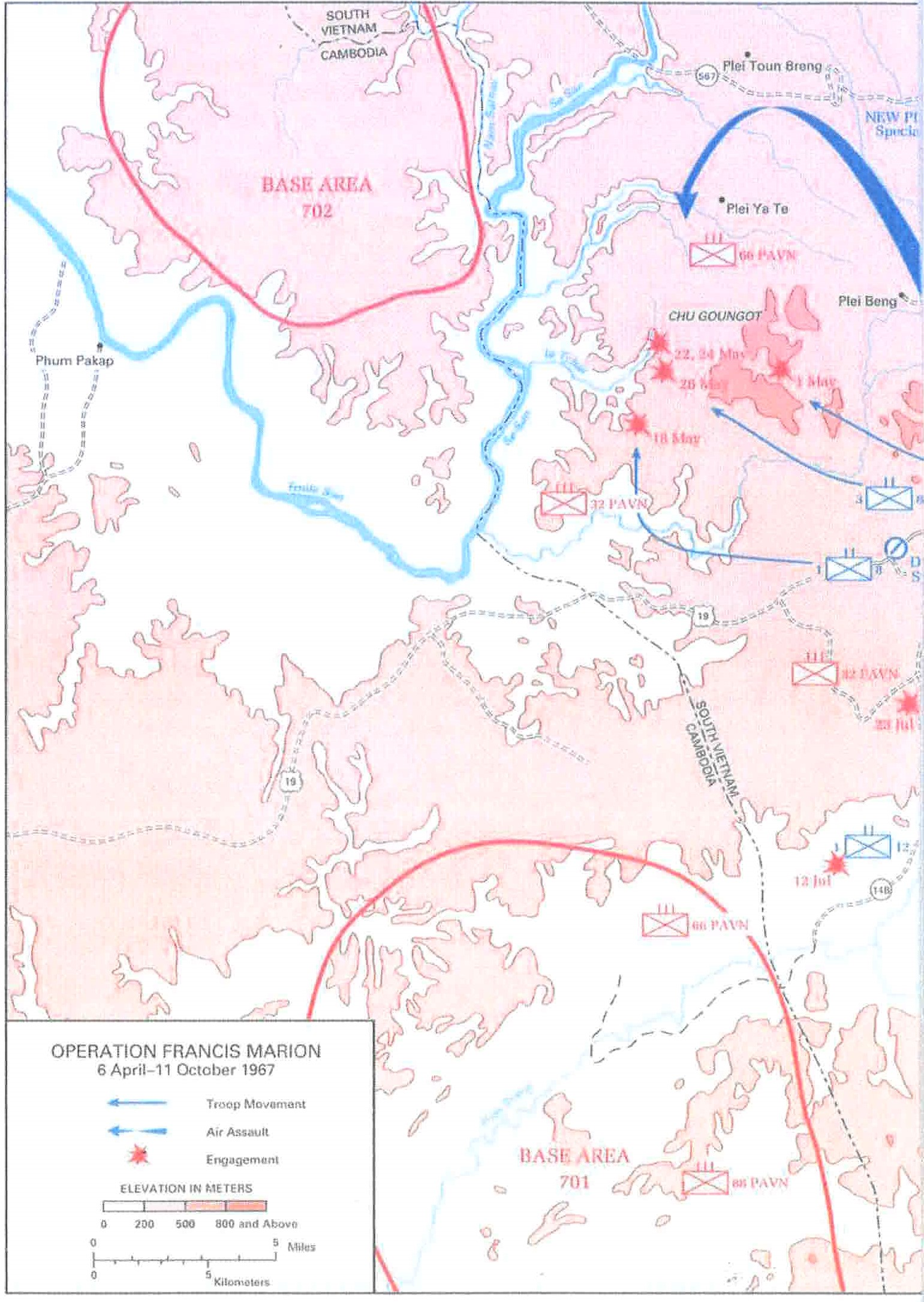
- Operation Francis Marion, 6 April - 11 October 1967
Date	6 April – 11 October 1967
Location	Pleiku, Darlac and Kon Tum Provinces, South Vietnam
Result	Inconclusive

Belligerents
United States; South Vietnam	North Vietnam

Commanders and leaders
(United States) Major general William R. Peers	Unknown

Units involved
(United States) 4th Infantry Division (United States) 173rd Airborne Brigade (South Vietnam) 42nd Regiment	32nd Regiment; 66th Regiment; 95B Regiment; 174th Regiment; K101D Battalion

Strength
Unknown	8,000 (US estimate)

Casualties and losses
(United States) 300 killed (South Vietnam) 100 killed	US body count: 1,204 killed and 122 captured 359 weapons recovered

Operation Francis Marion was a 4th Infantry Division and 173rd Airborne Brigade operation that took place in Pleiku, Darlac and Kon Tum Provinces, South Vietnam, lasting from 6 April to 11 October 1967.

== Background ==
The operation was a continuation of the recently concluded Operation Sam Houston in the same general area. 4th Infantry Division commander Major general William R. Peers planned a defense in depth against People's Army of Vietnam (PAVN) incursions from Base Areas 701 and 702 across the Cambodian border.

== Operation ==
Operation Francis Marion commenced on 6 April. The 1st Brigade, 4th Infantry Division deployed in an arc 20 km east of the Cambodian border along Highway 14B and the north-south line of U.S. Special Forces camps at Plei Djereng, Đức Cơ and Plei Me, with the 2nd Brigade held as a reserve force. Special Forces, CIDG units and the 4th Division's long-range reconnaissance teams would search the area west of this line to the Cambodian border. The Army of the Republic of Vietnam (ARVN) 23rd Division extended the screen south into Darlac Province and the 42nd Regiment of the 22nd Division extended it north into Kon Tum Province, split between Kon Tum city and Tân Cảnh Base Camp.

The operation saw isolated skirmishes in its first two weeks, then in mid-April Special Forces teams reported engaging a PAVN battalion in northern Darlac Province and several days later they reported sighting two PAVN companies 70 km south of Plei Me. In response to these reports on 24 April Peers sent a 1st Brigade battalion task force into northern Darlac Province.

On 28 April, the 2nd Battalion, 8th Infantry Regiment patrolling north of Plei Me ambushed a group of PAVN killing 13 and the remainder fled into a fortified base camp. The 2/8th Infantry were unable to break through the PAVN defenses despite air and artillery strikes. The following morning, supported by two tanks and M113s, they entered the camp but found it deserted. The force continued to advance, finding another base camp which was soon overrun by the tanks firing canister rounds, by mid-afternoon the battle was over, 138 PAVN soldiers from the 95B Regiment had been killed for the loss of one U.S. killed. On searching the base, the 2/8th Infantry found 42 weapons, supplies and ammunition and a notebook detailing PAVN objectives for the rainy season offensive, including the 2nd Brigade base at Landing Zone Oasis and the Special Forces camps at Plei Djereng, Đức Cơ and Plei Me.

On 1 May, a U.S. company repulsed a battalion-size attack near Đức Cơ. A prisoner revealed that two battalions of the 66th Regiment had recently arrived in the area around Đức Cơ and they planned to attack the Special Forces on 6 June, before attacking Plei Me.

Following four B-52 strikes southwest of Đức Cơ Camp, Peers sent the 1st Battalion, 8th Infantry in to search the area but they found no sign of PAVN activity. On 13 May, following a further B-52 strike 15 km northwest of Đức Cơ Camp, the 1/8th Infantry went in to search the area ending at Landing Zone Jackson Hole (13.838°N 107.684°E), the 1st Brigade base on Highway 14B, with the 3rd Battalion, 12th Infantry Regiment moving parallel to it. On the morning of 18 May, Company B 1/8th Infantry patrolling in the densely jungled Ia Tchar Valley near the Cambodian border saw and pursued a lone PAVN soldier. The pursuit led the Company into an ambush by a large PAVN force and they formed a defensive perimeter while calling in air and artillery support, however the thick jungle canopy prevented aerial observation and absorbed much of the force of the incoming fire. The Battalion commander sent Company A to assist but the thick jungle delayed their progress. Company B's 4th platoon radioed that they were being overrun and called in artillery fire directly on their position. Company A was then moved by helicopter to Company B's position arriving just before sunset. The following morning Company A located Company B's 4th platoon, which had lost 19 killed, one missing and seven wounded. The survivors said that after the PAVN overran the position they played dead while the PAVN executed those who moved. The rest of Company B lost had 10 killed and 24 wounded, while sweeps turned up 119 PAVN bodies. The PAVN were identified as being from the 32nd Regiment, which had last been seen in March 1967. Sergeant first class Bruce Alan Grandstaff would be posthumously awarded the Medal of Honor for his actions during this attack.

On 18 May, a U.S. unit set up a night defensive position in an abandoned PAVN base camp. Shortly after dark, the PAVN began mortaring the position and then sent three assault waves against the position. The attack continued for several hours before the PAVN withdrew, leaving 38 dead and eight weapons, while U.S. losses were 10 killed. Four B-52 strikes were made on the surrounding area in the next 24 hours to deter any further attacks. Private first class Leslie Allen Bellrichard and Staff sergeant Ferenc Zoltán Molnár would each be posthumously awarded the Medal of Honor for their actions during this attack.

Peers moved the 3/12th Infantry into the Ia Tchar Valley to support the 1/8th Infantry and arranged for the 173rd Airborne Brigade to be moved in as reinforcements. On the morning of 24 May, two companies of the 3/12th Infantry were about to break camp when they were hit by mortar fire and then attacked by a battalion-sized force. After two hours of fighting, low cloud in the area cleared allowing air support to break up the attack. U.S. losses were 10 killed while PAVN losses were 79 killed and four captured.

On 23 May, it was decided to replace the 1/8th Infantry with the 3/8th Infantry. On 24 May, as the 3/8th Infantry shuffled its companies, one understrength company was left alone to defend a hilltop landing zone when they were hit by a PAVN attack. Artillery fire was called in and a relief column sent and after an hour the PAVN withdrew leaving 37 dead, while U.S. losses were four killed.

On the morning of 26 May, Company C, 3/8th Infantry was moving through thick jungle when it was hit by sniper fire killing the company commander and then hitting every officer in the company with a Master Sergeant having to take command and form a defensive perimeter. Company B sent 3 platoons to support Company C, only one of which was able to reach them, the others being stopped by intense fire. The PAVN launched several assaults, coming within 10m of the U.S. lines but were unable to penetrate and were eventually driven back by artillery and gunship fire leaving 96 dead and two wounded behind.

PAVN tactics were similar to those seen during Operation Sam Houston; the PAVN usually controlled the place and timing of the fighting, launching surprise attacks on units moving through jungle or in overnight positions, attacking with large amounts of mortar and RPG-2 fire and then withdrawing when American pressure became too great. Most of the engagements occurred close to the Cambodian border so the PAVN could withdraw to their cross-border sanctuaries as needed.

On 27 May, Peers sent the 173rd Airborne Brigade into the Ia Drang Valley, but despite now having three brigades operating near the border, the PAVN were still able to mortar Đức Cơ Camp on 19 and 23 June. In Kon Tum Province on 13 June, the PAVN K101D Battalion attacked a CIDG unit 20 km southwest of Tan Canh and on 15 June they destroyed a Special Forces mobile guerilla force nearby. On 17 June, Peers ordered the 173rd Airborne Brigade to reinforce Đắk Tô Base Camp. This would mark the beginning of Operation Greeley, which would culminate in the Battle of Dak To in November 1967.

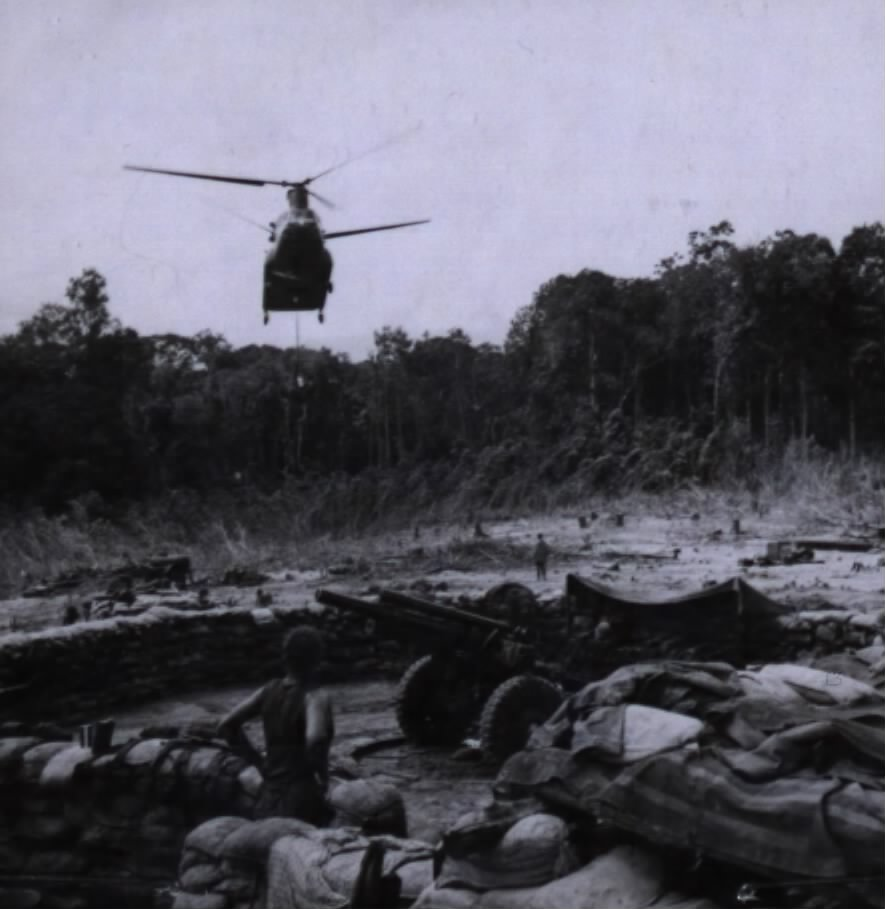
A CH-47 Chinook flies over a 105mm howitzer gun emplacement during resupply operations for elements of the 1st Battalion, 12th Regiment, 9 July

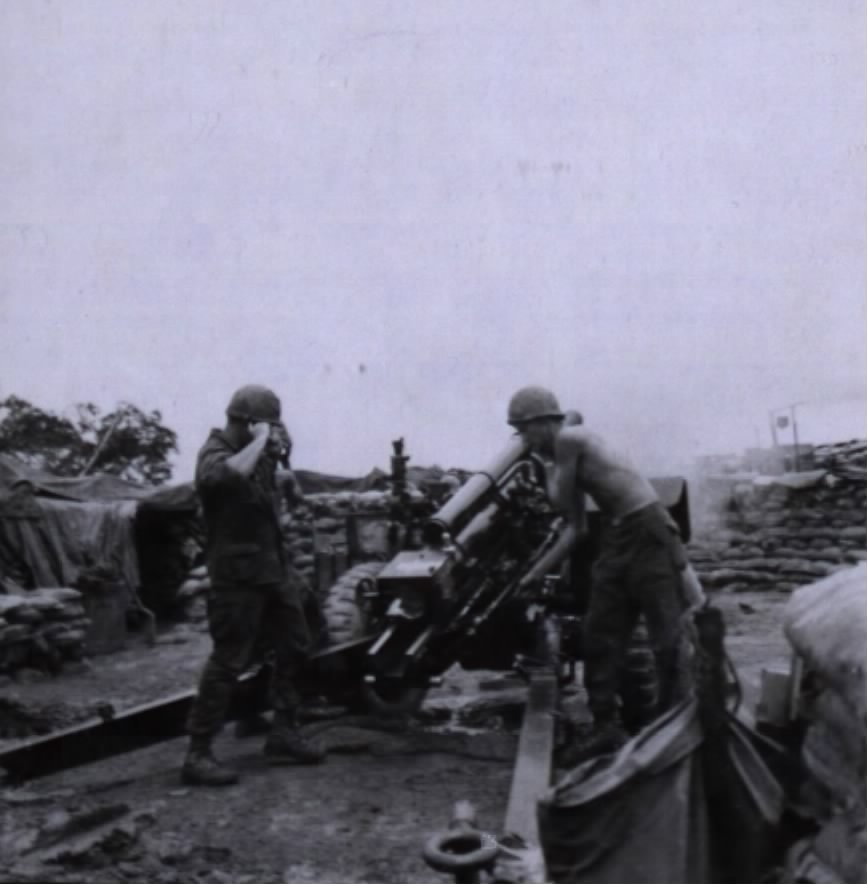
Battery "B", 42nd Artillery Regiment fire an M2A2 105mm howitzer, 9 July

On 10 July, two B-52 strikes took place between the Ia Drang Valley and Đức Cơ within 5 km of the Cambodian border and on 11 July the 1/12th Infantry was deployed to conduct bomb damage assessment of the area. The unit found no evidence of PAVN and moved 1 km east to set up two night defensive positions. On the morning of 12 July, a patrolling platoon from Company C engaged a PAVN force, killing three. Thirty minutes later, Company C saw a larger PAVN force and called in artillery fire. Company C ordered its patrol platoon to move to Company B's position, however the platoon then ran into another PAVN force and was soon surrounded. A platoon from Company B was sent to assist the Company C platoon and was similarly surrounded. Fog and low cloud prevented aerial observation and support until 11:00 and the isolated platoon relied on artillery support to avoid being overrun. Companies B and C were ordered to move to assist their beleaguered platoons but mortar fire hit the Company B command group killing the commander. Air and artillery support and reinforcements eventually forced the PAVN to abandon their attacks leaving 142 dead, U.S. losses were 31 dead and seven missing (six of whom became POWs and were returned in 1973) most of them from the Company B platoon.

On 23 July, Companies B and C 3/8th Infantry were manning positions south of Đức Cơ, 10 km east of the Cambodian border. Each Company's 3 platoons were ordered to patrol the area to the west. At midday, a platoon from Company C fired on two PAVN and was met by return fire from all directions, a second platoon was ordered to assist and was similarly pinned down. The PAVN then attacked the Company C command post, but this was beaten back by helicopter gunships and reinforcement by Company B. The remainder of Company C, backed by Company B, Company A and other reinforcements with strong air and artillery support, then set out to rescue the two platoons, driving the PAVN 32nd Regiment back towards Cambodia. U.S. losses in the five hour battle were 18 killed, while PAVN losses were 184 killed by body count and 63 weapons captured.

On 3 August, the PAVN ambushed a CIDG patrol 1 km from Dak Seang Camp and prisoner interrogations revealed that the newly arrived PAVN 174th Regiment planned to attack both Dak Seang and Dak Pek Camp. The ARVN airlifted a battalion of the 42nd Regiment and the 1st Airborne Task Force to Dak Seang and this force patrolled west from Dak Seang, where they encountered an entrenched battalion of the 174th Regiment. After a four-day battle and with heavy air support, the ARVN overran the position forcing the surviving defenders to flee into Laos. In the base were 189 PAVN dead, ammunition and equipment and a command post with a mock-up of the Dak Seang camp, which the PAVN apparently planned to attack on the night of 6 August.

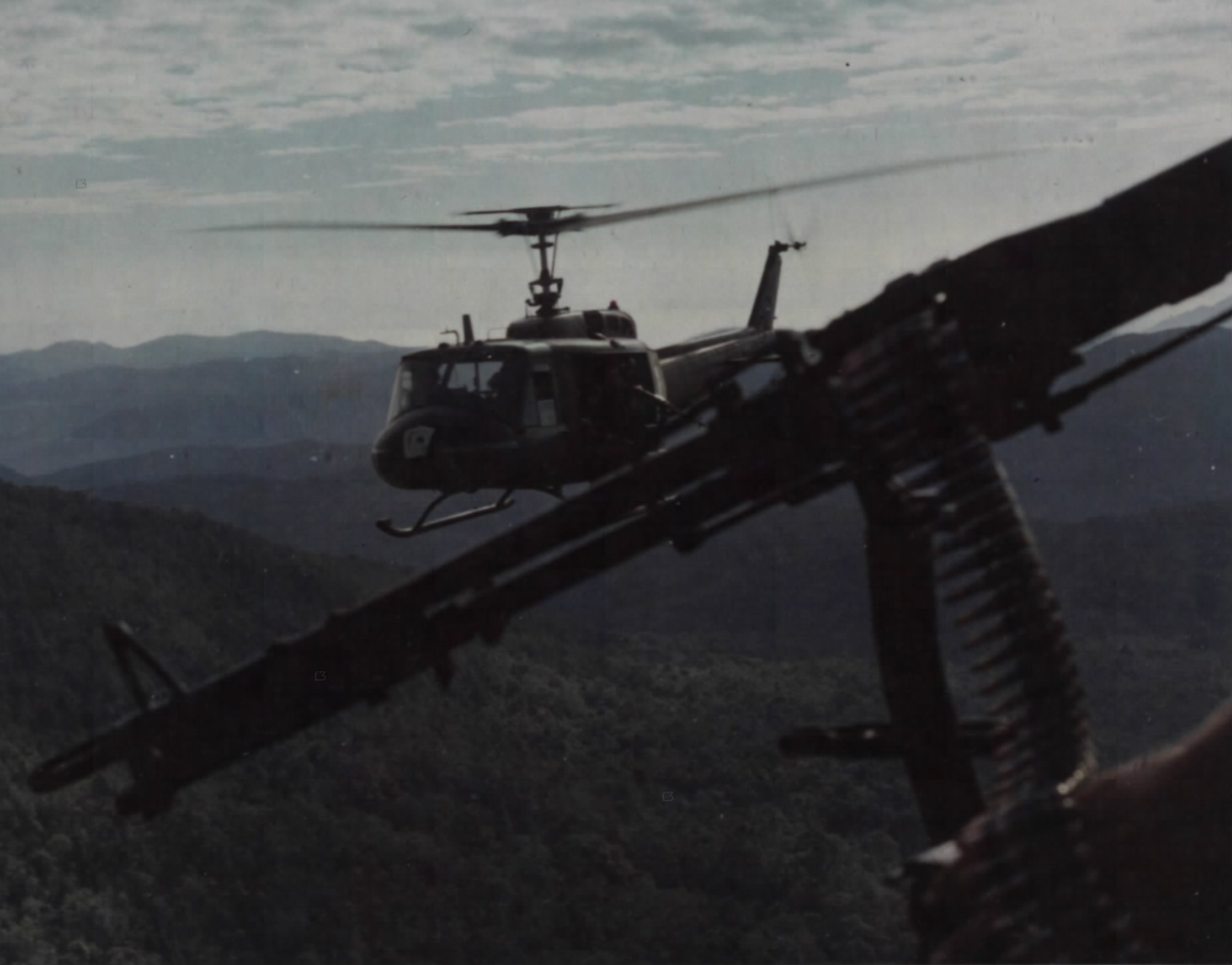
UH-1Ds during the operation, 20 October

Between 24 September and 10 October, Peers deployed the 2nd Brigade to interdict PAVN infiltration through the Dak Payau Valley, southeast of Pleiku. On 1 October, helicopter gunships and tactical air support engaged a PAVN force moving along a trail, killing 49 by body count and taking two prisoners from the 95B Regiment.

== Aftermath ==
The operation finally concluded on 11 October 1967. US forces claimed that PAVN losses were 1,204 killed and 122 captured, while U.S. losses were 300 killed and ARVN losses were 100 killed. The 1st Brigade, 4th Infantry Division continued to screen the border in western Pleiku Province, while 2nd Brigade continued east into Phu Bon Province to interdict PAVN infiltration.
