= Grandstaff =

Grandstaff is a surname. Notable people with the surname include:

- Bruce Alan Grandstaff (1934–1967), American Vietnam War veteran
- Olive Kathryn Grandstaff, later known as Kathryn Crosby (1933–2024), American actress
- Tracy Grandstaff (born 1963), American actress, writer and production assistant
