= Leslie Allen Bellrichard =

- Born: December 4, 1941; Janesville, Wisconsin, US
- Died: May 20, 1967 (aged 25); Kon Tum Province, Republic of Vietnam
- Burial place: Oak Hill Cemetery Janesville, Wisconsin
- Military career
- Allegiance: United States of America
- Branch: United States Army
- Service years: 1966–1967
- Rank: Private First Class
- Units: C Company, 1st Battalion, 8th Infantry Regiment, 4th Infantry Division
- Conflicts: Vietnam War (DOW)
- Awards: Medal of Honor; Purple Heart

Leslie Allen Bellrichard (December 4, 1941 – May 20, 1967) was a United States Army soldier and a recipient of the United States military's highest decoration—the Medal of Honor—for his actions in the Vietnam War.

== Biography ==
Bellrichard joined the Army from Oakland, California in 1966, and by May 20, 1967, was serving as a private first class in Company C, 1st Battalion, 8th Infantry Regiment, 4th Infantry Division. During a firefight on that day during Operation Francis Marion in Kontum Province, South Vietnam, he was preparing to throw a hand grenade when a nearby explosion caused him to drop the activated device. Bellrichard smothered the blast of the grenade with his body, sacrificing himself to protect those around him.

Bellrichard, aged 25 at his death, was buried in Oakhill Cemetery in his birth city of Janesville, Wisconsin.

In 2004 the city of Janesville renamed the Crosby-Willard Bridge over the Rock River the Bellrichard Bridge.

== Medal of Honor citation ==
Private Bellrichard's official Medal of Honor citation reads:

For conspicuous gallantry and intrepidity in action at the risk of his life above and beyond the call of duty. Acting as a fire team leader with Company C, during combat operations Pfc. Bellrichard was with 4 fellow soldiers in a foxhole on their unit's perimeter when the position came under a massive enemy attack. Following a 30-minute mortar barrage, the enemy launched a strong ground assault. Pfc. Bellrichard rose in face of a group of charging enemy soldiers and threw hand grenades into their midst, eliminating several of the foe and forcing the remainder to withdraw. Failing in their initial attack, the enemy repeated the mortar and rocket bombardment of the friendly perimeter, then once again charged against the defenders in a concerted effort to overrun the position. Pfc. Bellrichard resumed throwing hand grenades at the onrushing attackers. As he was about to hurl a grenade, a mortar round exploded just in front of his position, knocking him into the foxhole and causing him to lose his grip on the already armed grenade. Recovering instantly, Pfc. Bellrichard recognized the threat to the lives of his 4 comrades and threw himself upon the grenade, shielding his companions from the blast that followed. Although severely wounded, Pfc. Bellrichard struggled into an upright position in the foxhole and fired his rifle at the enemy until he succumbed to his wounds. His selfless heroism contributed greatly to the successful defense of the position, and he was directly responsible for saving the lives of several of his comrades. His acts are in keeping with the highest traditions of the military service and reflect great credit upon himself and the U.S. Army.

== See also ==
- List of Medal of Honor recipients for the Vietnam War
