= Ferenc Zoltán Molnár =

American soldier and Medal of Honor recipient

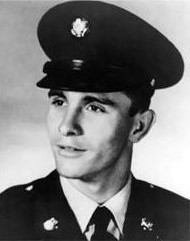
- Born: February 14, 1943; Logan, West Virginia, US
- Died: May 20, 1967 (aged 24); Kontum Province, Republic of Vietnam
- Burial place: Highland Memory Gardens, Godby Heights, West Virginia
- Military career
- Allegiance: United States of America
- Branch: United States Army
- Service years: 1962–1967
- Rank: Staff Sergeant
- Nicknames: Frankie, Zoly
- Units: Company B, 1st Battalion, 8th Infantry Regiment, 4th Infantry Division
- Conflicts: Vietnam War †
- Awards: Medal of Honor; Bronze Star; Purple Heart

Ferenc "Frankie" Zoltán Molnár (February 14, 1943 – May 20, 1967) was a United States Army soldier of Hungarian descent and a recipient of the United States military's highest decoration—the Medal of Honor—for his actions in the Vietnam War. Frankie and Zoli are nicknames of Ferenc and Zoltán, respectively.

== Biography ==
Molnár joined the Army from Fresno, California in 1962, and by May 20, 1967, was serving as a staff sergeant in Company B, 1st Battalion, 8th Infantry Regiment, 4th Infantry Division. During an enemy assault on that day during Operation Francis Marion in Kontum Province, South Vietnam, Molnár organized his squad's defense and, when a grenade landed among them, smothered the blast with his body at the expense of his life.

Molnár, aged 24 at his death, was buried in Highland Memory Gardens, Godby Heights, West Virginia.

== Medal of Honor citation ==
Staff Sergeant Molnár's official Medal of Honor citation reads:

For conspicuous gallantry and intrepidity in action at the risk of his life above and beyond the call of duty. S/Sgt. Molnár distinguished himself while serving as a squad leader with Company B, during combat operations. Shortly after the battalion's defensive perimeter was established, it was hit by intense mortar fire as the prelude to a massive enemy night attack. S/Sgt. Molnár immediately left his sheltered location to insure the readiness of his squad to meet the attack. As he crawled through the position, he discovered a group of enemy soldiers closing in on his squad area. His accurate rifle fire killed 5 of the enemy and forced the remainder to flee. When the mortar fire stopped, the enemy attacked in a human wave supported by grenades, rockets, automatic weapons, and small-arms fire. After assisting to repel the first enemy assault, S/Sgt. Molnár found that his squad's ammunition and grenade supply was nearly expended. Again leaving the relative safety of his position, he crawled through intense enemy fire to secure additional ammunition and distribute it to his squad. He rejoined his men to beat back the renewed enemy onslaught, and he moved about his area providing medical aid and assisting in the evacuation of the wounded. With the help of several men, he was preparing to move a severely wounded soldier when an enemy hand grenade was thrown into the group. The first to see the grenade, S/Sgt. Molnár threw himself on it and absorbed the deadly blast to save his comrades. His demonstrated selflessness and inspirational leadership on the battlefield were a major factor in the successful defense of the American position and are in keeping with the finest traditions of the U.S. Army. S/Sgt. Molnár's actions reflect great credit upon himself, his unit, and the U.S. Army.

== See also ==
- List of Medal of Honor recipients for the Vietnam War
