= 4th Infantry Division (United States) =

Active US Army formation

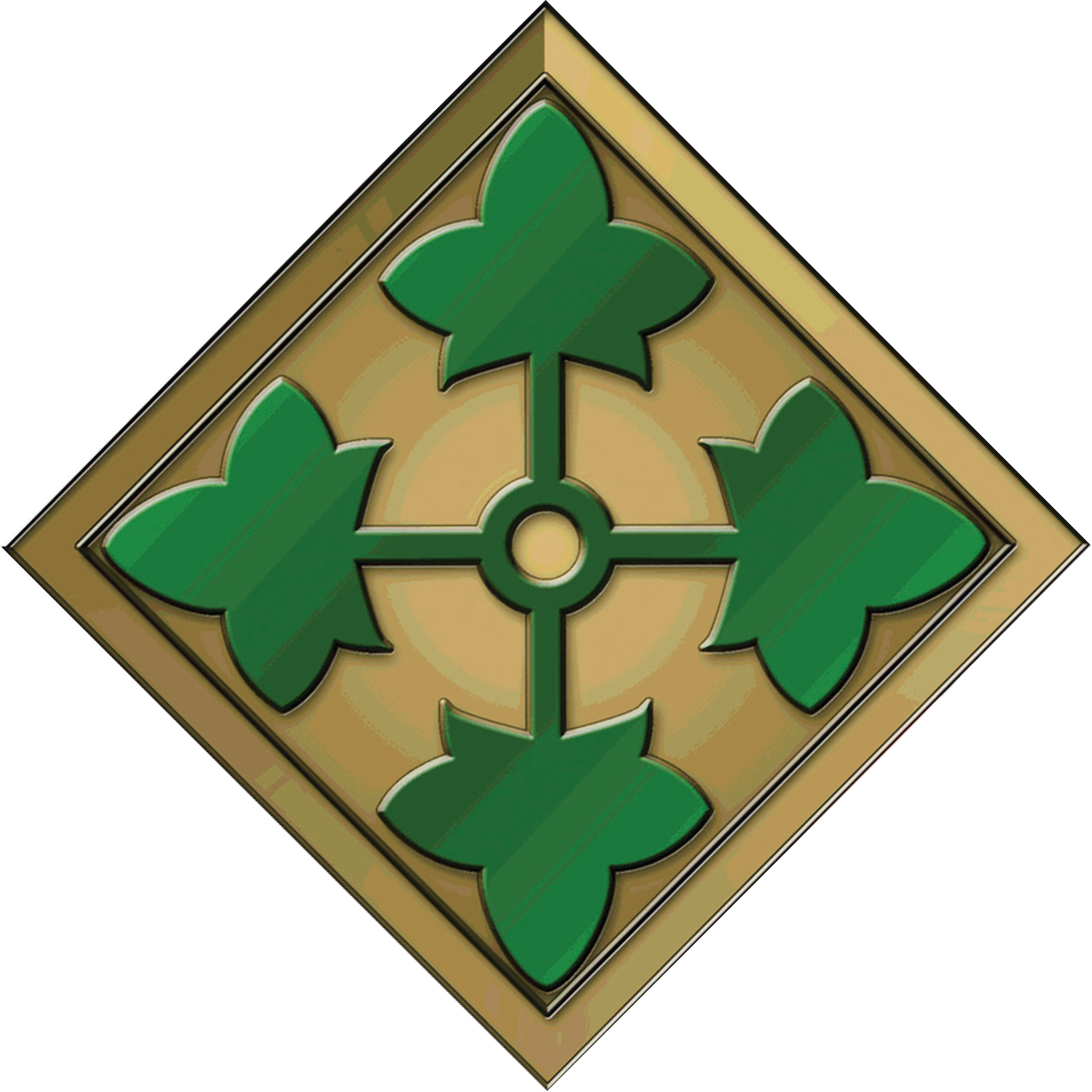
- Insignia of the 4th Infantry Division
- Active: 19 November 1917–21 September 1921; 1 June 1940–12 March 1946; 15 July 1947–present
- Country: United States of America
- Branch: United States Army
- Type: Stryker Infantry; Light Infantry; Combined Arms
- Role: Headquarters
- Size: Division
- Part of: I Corps (United States)
- Garrison/HQ: Fort Carson, Colorado
- Nicknames: "Ivy Division", "Iron Horse", "Ivy"
- Mottos: Steadfast and Loyal
- Engagements: World War I; Aisne-Marne; St. Mihiel; Meuse-Argonne; Champagne 1918; Lorraine 1918; World War II; Normandy; Northern France; Rhineland; Ardennes-Alsace; Central Europe; Vietnam War; War on terror; Afghanistan; Iraq; Operation Inherent Resolve

Commanders
- Current commander: MG Patrick J. Ellis
- Notable commanders: Full list of commanders

Insignia
- Distinctive unit insignia

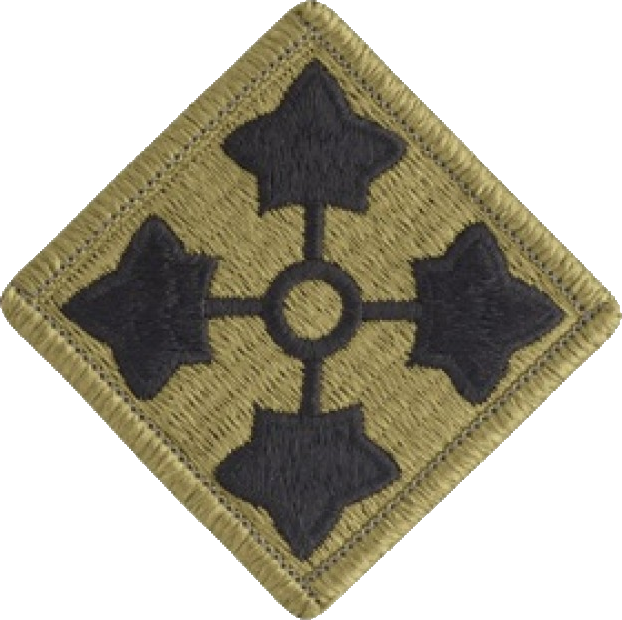
- Subdued shoulder sleeve insignia worn on OCP-ACU

- Combat service identification badge

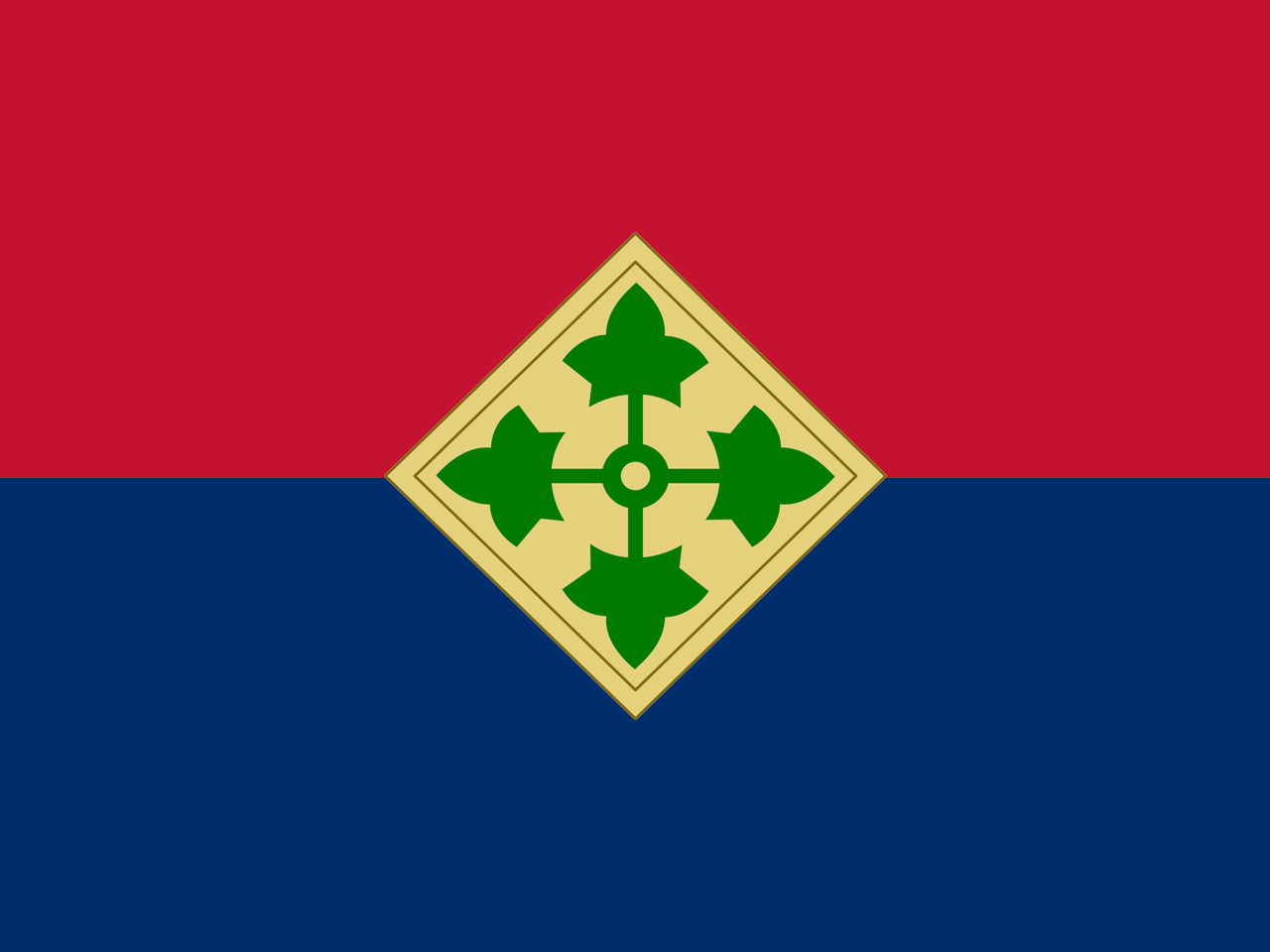
- Flag of the United States Army 4th Infantry Division

The 4th Infantry Division is a division of the United States Army based at Fort Carson, Colorado. It is composed of a division headquarters battalion, three Stryker brigade combat teams, a combat aviation brigade, a division sustainment brigade, and a division artillery.

The 4th Infantry Division's official nickname, "Ivy", is a play on words of the Roman numeral IV or 4. Ivy leaves symbolize tenacity and fidelity which is the basis of the division's motto: "Steadfast and Loyal". The second nickname, "Iron Horse", has been adopted to underscore the speed and power of the division and its soldiers.

== History ==
=== World War I ===
On 19 November 1917, about seven months after American entry into World War I on 6 April 1917, the War Department directed the organization of the 4th Division at Camp Greene, North Carolina, around a cadre of Regular Army troops that had been stationed at Camp Greene, the Presidio of Monterey, California, Vancouver Barracks, Washington, and other posts. It was at Camp Greene where the division originally adopted its distinctive insignia of four ivy leaves. The ivy leaf came from the Roman numerals for four (IV) and signified their motto "Steadfast and Loyal."

On 10 December 1917, Major General George H. Cameron assumed command. At the end of December, with 13,000 men, systematic training began. During and subsequent to the latter part of February 1918, men who had been inducted from all sections of the United States are sent to the division, while from 1–21 March, drafts aggregating 10,000 men from Camps Custer, Michigan, Camp Grant, Illinois, Camp Lewis, Washington, Camp Pike, Arkansas, and Camp Travis, Texas, completed the division. The division sailed overseas from late April to early June 1918.

==== Organization ====
- Headquarters, 4th Division
- 7th Infantry Brigade
  - 39th Infantry Regiment (formed with a cadre from the 30th Infantry)
  - 47th Infantry Regiment (formed with a cadre from the 9th Infantry)
  - 11th Machine Gun Battalion
- 8th Infantry Brigade
  - 58th Infantry Regiment (formed with a cadre from the 4th Infantry)
  - 59th Infantry Regiment (formed with a cadre from the 4th Infantry)
  - 12th Machine Gun Battalion
- 4th Field Artillery Brigade
  - 13th Field Artillery Regiment (155 mm) (formed with a cadre from the 5th Field Artillery)
  - 16th Field Artillery Regiment (75 mm) (formed with a cadre from the 8th Field Artillery)
  - 77th Field Artillery Regiment (75 mm) (formed from the 19th Cavalry)
  - 4th Trench Mortar Battery
- 4th Engineer Regiment
- 10th Machine Gun Battalion
- 8th Field Signal Battalion
- Headquarters Troop, 4th Division
- 4th Train Headquarters and Military Police
  - 4th Ammunition Train
  - 4th Supply Train
  - 4th Engineer Train
  - 4th Sanitary Train
    - 19th, 21st, 28th, and 33rd Ambulance Companies and Field Hospitals

==== St. Mihiel Offensive ====
For the Battle of Saint-Mihiel, the division moved into an area south of Verdun as part of the First United States Army. General John Pershing, commander of the American Expeditionary Force (AEF) on the Western Front, had gotten the French and British to agree that the AEF would fight under its own organizational elements. One of the first missions assigned to the AEF was the reduction of the Saint-Mihiel salient. The 4th Division, assigned to V Corps, was on the western face of the salient. The plan was for V Corps to push generally southeast and to meet IV Corps who was pushing northwest, thereby trapping the Germans in the St. Mihiel area.

The 59th Infantry Regiment moved into an area previously occupied by the French, deploying along a nine kilometer front. On 12 September, the first patrols were sent forward by the 59th. The 4th Division attack began on 14 September with the 8th Brigade capturing the town of Manheulles. All along the front, the American forces pressed forward and closed the St. Mihiel salient.

==== Occupation duty ====
Under the terms of the Armistice, Germany was to evacuate all territory west of the Rhine. American troops were to relocate to the center section of this previously German-occupied area all the way to the Koblenz bridgehead on the Rhine. The 4th marched into Germany, covering 330 miles in 15 days where it was widely dispersed over an area with Bad Bertrich as division headquarters. The division established training for the men as well as sports and educational activities. In April 1919 the division moved to a new occupation area further north on the Rhine.

The division went north to Ahrweiler, Germany, in the Rheinland-Pfalz area. In July the division returned to France and the last detachment sailed for the United States on 31 July 1919.

=== Interwar period ===
The 4th Division arrived at Camp Merritt, New Jersey, on 1 August 1919, after completing 8 months of occupation duty near and in Bad Bertrich and Bad Breisig, Germany. Emergency period personnel were discharged from the service at Camp Merritt after arrival. The division proceeded to Camp Dodge, Iowa, and arrived 8 August. The division took up temporary station until January 1920, when it was transferred to Camp Lewis, Washington, for permanent station.

As a part of the War Department's decision to maintain only three fully-active stateside infantry divisions, the 4th Division was inactivated on 21 September 1921, less the 8th Infantry Brigade and several other divisional elements. The remaining division personnel and equipment were transferred to the 3rd Division. Concurrently, the inactive units were assigned to "active associate" units for mobilization purposes; the active associate units would provide the cadre from which the inactive units would be formed in the event of war. For mobilization responsibility, the division was allotted to the Fourth Corps Area and assigned to the IV Corps. Camp McClellan, Alabama, was designated as the mobilization and training station for the division upon reactivation. During the period 1921–39, the 4th Division was represented by the 8th Infantry Brigade and other assorted active elements, which formed the base force from which the division would be reactivated in the event of war. In 1926, the War Department abandoned the active associate concept and authorized the manning of inactive Regular Army units with Organized Reserve personnel. The division headquarters was organized by June 1927 as a "Regular Army Inactive" (RAI) unit at Fort McPherson, Georgia, and many of the inactive elements of the division were also organized as such after mid-1927.

The RAI units generally trained with the active elements of the division during summer training camps. Several units, such as the 4th Signal Company, 4th Engineer Regiment, and the 39th Infantry Regiment, were affiliated with various colleges and universities the sponsored the Reserve Officers Training Corps and organized as RAI units with the Regular Army cadre and commissionees from the schools’ programs. The active elements of the division also maintained habitual training relationships with many Organized Reserve units in the Fourth Corps Area, including the IV Corps, XIV Corps, and the 81st, 82nd, and 87th Divisions. The training of the Reserve units was usually conducted at Camp McClellan, and frequently, at the regimental home stations of 4th Division units. The 8th and 22nd Infantry Regiments also supported the Reserve units’ conduct of the Citizens Military Training Camps held at Camp McClellan and Fort McPherson. The 8th Infantry Brigade, reinforced by the active elements of the 4th Tank Company, 83rd Field Artillery Regiment, and 4th Engineer Regiment held annual maneuvers at Fort Benning, Georgia.

The division headquarters was occasionally formed in a provisional status during summer camps or command post exercises (CPXs) to train Regular and Reserve officers in division-level command and control procedures. It was provisionally formed on 5 September 1936 for the Third Army CPX held that month at Camp Bullis, Texas. The division headquarters was also provisionally formed for the August 1938 Third Army Maneuvers in the DeSoto National Forest in Mississippi. For that maneuver, the division (8th Infantry Brigade as the nucleus) was reinforced by the 17th Ordnance Company, a detachment of the 51st Signal Battalion, and the Georgia National Guard’s 122nd Infantry Regiment, in addition to the active divisional elements.

=== World War II ===
The 4th Division was reactivated on 1 June 1940 at Fort Benning, Georgia, under the command of Major General Walter Prosser. The division was brought to full strength first by voluntary enlistments, and after the passage of the Selective Training and Service Act, the assignment of 5,300 draftees in February and March 1941, who primarily hailed from New York, New Jersey, and Delaware. Commencing in the summer of 1941, the formation was reorganized as a motorized division for the upcoming Louisiana Maneuvers, and assigned (along with the 2nd Armored Division) to I Armored Corps. It was first given its motorized title in parenthesized style, and then as the “4th Motorized Division” effective 11 July 1941. The division participated in the Louisiana Maneuvers held during August–September 1941 and then in the Carolina Maneuvers of October–November 1941, after which it returned to Fort Benning. The division transferred to Camp Gordon, Georgia, in December 1941, the month America entered World War II, and rehearsed training at the Carolina Maneuver Area during the summer of 1942.

The division, now under the command of Major General Raymond O. Barton, then moved on 12 April 1943 to Fort Dix, New Jersey, where it reorganized as a standard infantry division and was redesignated the 4th Infantry Division on 4 August of that year. The division participated in battlefield maneuvers and instruction in Florida starting in September and after this fall training exercise arrived at Camp Jackson, South Carolina, on 1 December 1943. At this station the division was alerted for overseas movement and staged at Camp Kilmer, New Jersey, beginning 4 January 1944 prior to departing the New York Port of Embarkation on 18 January 1944. The 4th Infantry Division sailed to England where it arrived on 26 January 1944.

==== Division organization ====
The 4th Infantry Division consisted of the following units:

4th Infantry Division organization (click to enlarge)

- 4th Infantry Division
  - 4th Infantry Division Headquarters
  - 4th Cavalry Reconnaissance Troop (Mechanized) (M3 scout cars and then M8 Greyhound armored cars)
  - 8th Infantry Regiment
    - Headquarters and Headquarters Company
    - 3× Infantry battalions
      - each battalion consists of: 1× Headquarters and Headquarters Company, 3× Rifle companies, 1× Heavy Weapons Company
    - Cannon Company (T12 Gun Motor Carriages and T19 Howitzer Motor Carriages, later replaced by either M3 105mm towed howitzers or M7 Priest self propelled howitzers)
    - Anti-Tank Company (M3 37mm anti-tank guns, which were replaced by 1944 with M1 57mm anti-tank guns)
    - Service Company
  - 12th Infantry Regiment
    - same organization as 8th Infantry Regiment
  - 22nd Infantry Regiment
    - same organization as 8th Infantry Regiment
  - 4th Infantry Division Artillery
    - Headquarters and Headquarters Battery
    - 20th Field Artillery Battalion
      - Headquarters and Headquarters Battery
      - 3× Batteries (M1 155mm towed howitzers)
      - Service Battery
    - 29th Field Artillery Battalion
      - Headquarters and Headquarters Battery
      - 3× Batteries (M2 105mm towed howitzers)
      - Service Battery
    - 42nd Field Artillery Battalion
      - same organization as 29th Field Artillery Battalion
    - 44th Field Artillery Battalion
      - same organization as 29th Field Artillery Battalion
  - Headquarters Special Troops
    - Headquarters Company, 4th Infantry Division
    - 4th Signal Company
    - 4th Quartermaster Company
    - 704th Ordnance Light Maintenance Company
    - 4th Military Police Platoon
    - 4th Infantry Division Band (attached)
  - 4th Engineer Combat Battalion
    - Headquarters and Headquarters and Service Company
    - 3× Engineer combat companies
  - 4th Medical Battalion
    - Headquarters and Headquarters Detachment
    - 3× Collecting companies
    - Clearing Company

==== Training in the United Kingdom ====
Once in the United Kingdom, the division became absorbed in "an incredible degree of rugged and realistic training" for the amphibious assault on continental Europe. Soldiers rehearsed every step of the coming invasion in detail, starting with small-unit exercises and working up to the scale of the entire Utah force, including the 4th and numerous attachments. It was during this final dress rehearsal for the D-Day landings, Exercise Tiger, that the division would actually suffer its greatest losses in connection with the D-Day landings. German E-boats infiltrated the exercise area and torpedoed several of the landing ships, killing at least 749 of the force. The incident was little acknowledged until long after the war.

==== France ====
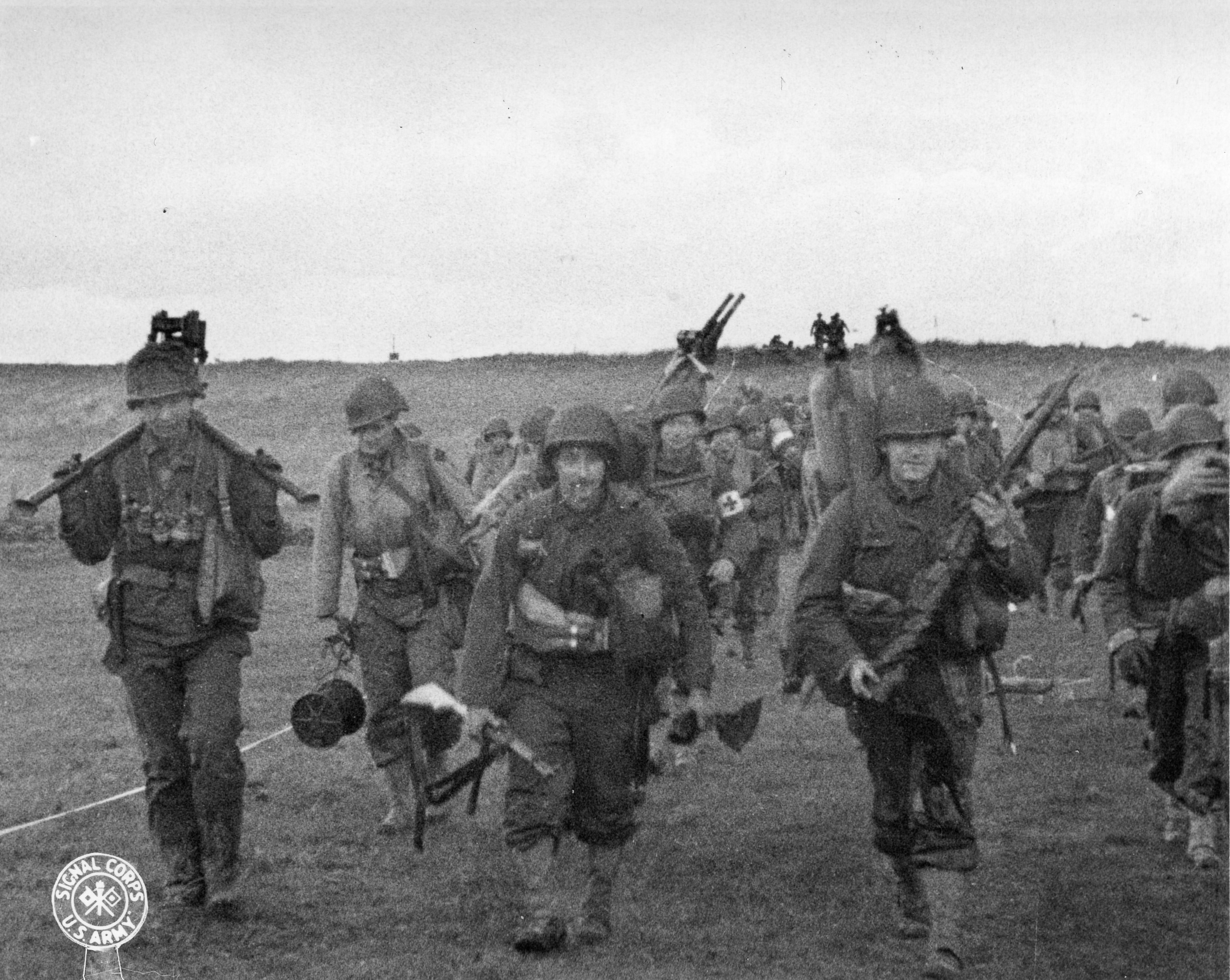
American assault troops of Colonel James Van Fleet's 8th Infantry Regiment, 4th Infantry Division, with full equipment after just landing in Northern France, June 9, 1944.

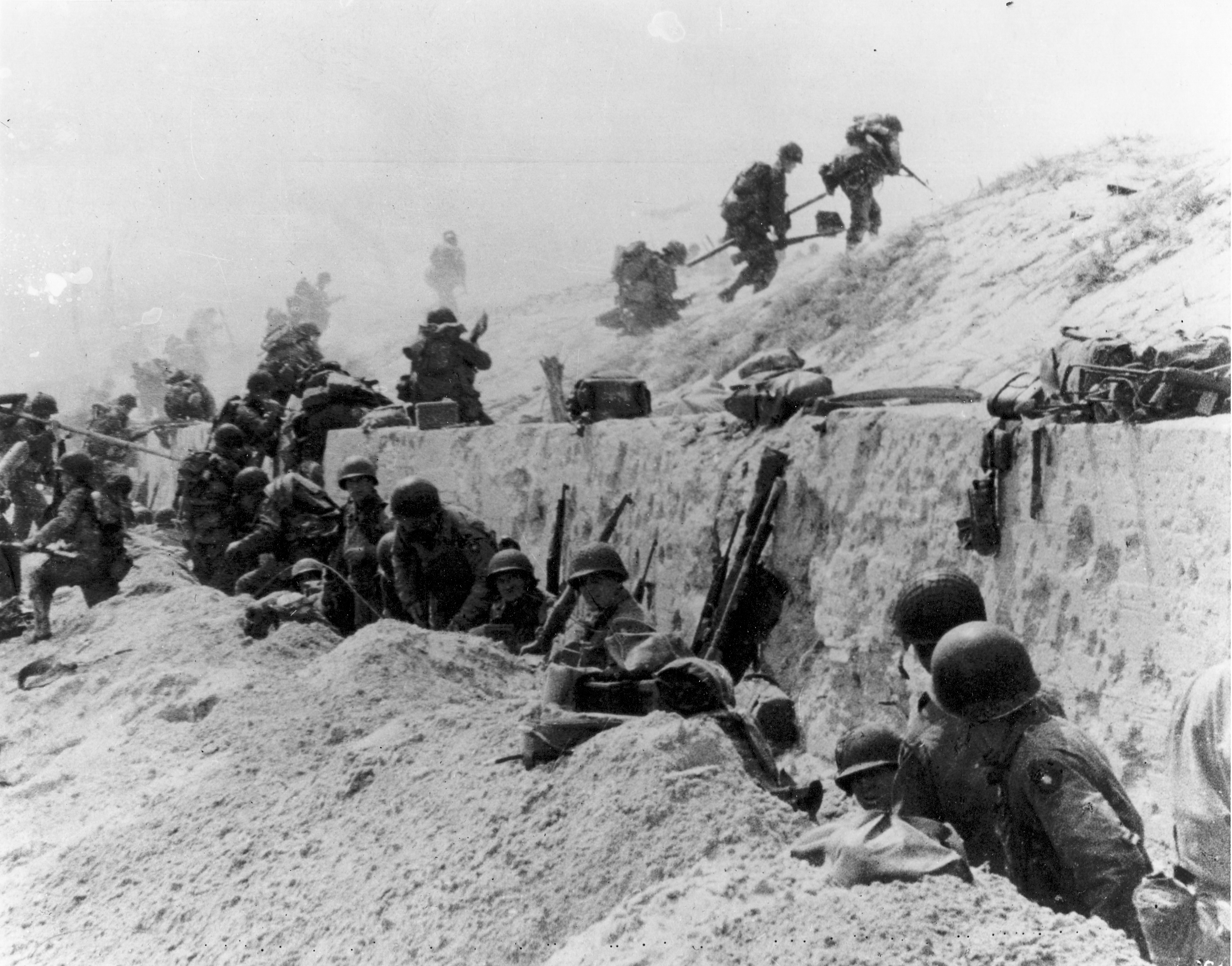
Men of the 4th Infantry Division move off the Utah Beachhead on D-Day.

The 4th Infantry Division assaulted the northern coast of German-held France during the Normandy landings, landing at Utah Beach, 6 June 1944. The 8th Infantry Regiment of the 4th Infantry Division claimed being the first surface-borne Allied unit (as opposed to the parachutist formations that were air-dropped earlier) to hit the beaches at Normandy on D-Day, 6 June 1944. Before daylight assault troops of B, C, E and F companies had descended their rope ladders and loaded onto their 20 LCVPs and were circling near the transports until the step-off time. Before 0900 the 1st and 2nd Battalions, 8th Infantry had destroyed all resistance of a two mile long stretch of Utah Beach.

Moving inland and relieving the isolated 82nd Airborne Division at Sainte-Mère-Église, the 4th then cleared the Cotentin Peninsula and took part in the capture of Cherbourg on 25 June. After taking part in the fighting near Periers, 6–12 July, the division broke through the left flank of the German 7th Army, helping to stem the German drive toward Avranches.

By the end of August the division had moved to Paris, and gave French forces the first place in the liberation of their capital. During the liberation of Paris, Ernest Hemingway took on a self-appointed role as a civilian scout in the city of Paris for his friends in the 4 ID. He was with the 22nd Infantry Regiment when it advanced from Paris, northeast through Belgium, and into Germany. J. D. Salinger, who met Hemingway during the liberation of Paris, was with the 12th Infantry Regiment.

==== Belgium, Luxembourg, and Germany ====
The 4th then moved into Belgium through Houffalize to attack the Siegfried Line at Schnee Eifel on 14 September, and made several penetrations. Slow progress into Germany continued in October, and by 6 November the division entered the Battle of Hurtgen Forest, where it was engaged in heavy fighting until early December. It then shifted to Luxembourg, only to meet the German Army's winter Ardennes Offensive head-on (in the Battle of the Bulge) starting on 16 December 1944. Although its lines were dented, it managed to hold the Germans at Dickweiler and Osweiler, and, counterattacking in January across the Sauer, overran German positions in Fouhren and Vianden.

Halted at the Prüm River in February by heavy enemy resistance, the division finally crossed on 28 February near Olzheim, and raced on across the Kyll on 7 March. After a short rest, the 4th moved across the Rhine on 29 March at Worms, attacked and secured Würzburg and by 3 April had established a bridgehead across the Main at Ochsenfurt. Speeding southeast across Bavaria, the division had reached Miesbach on the Isar on 2 May 1945, when it was relieved and placed on occupation duty. Writer J. D. Salinger served with the division from 1942–1945.

==== Casualties ====
The 4th Infantry Division suffered the highest number of battle casualties of any U.S. infantry division that was only engaged in one campaign or theater of World War II.

- Total battle casualties: 22,660
- Killed in action: 4,097
- Wounded in action: 17,371
- Missing in action: 461
- Prisoner of war: 731
- Days of combat: 299

=== Post War/Early Cold War ===
The division returned to the United States in July 1945 and was stationed at Camp Butner North Carolina, preparing for deployment to the Pacific. After the war ended it was deactivated on 5 March 1946. It was reactivated as a training division at Fort Ord, California on 15 July 1947.

On 1 October 1950, it was redesignated a combat division, training at Fort Benning, Georgia. In May 1951 it deployed to Germany as the first of four United States divisions committed to the North Atlantic Treaty Organization during the early years of the Cold War. The division headquarters was at Frankfurt. After a five-year tour in Germany, the division redeployed to Fort Lewis, Washington in May 1956.

The division was replaced in Germany by the 3rd Armored Division as part of an Operation Gyroscope deployment. The division was reduced to zero strength, the colors were transferred to Fort Lewis, Washington, and the division was reestablished by reflagging the 71st Infantry Division (which itself had just returned from Alaska) on 15 September 1956.

On 1 April 1957, the division was reorganized as a Pentomic Division. The division's three infantry regiments (the 8th, 12th and 22nd) were inactivated, with their elements reorganized into five infantry battle groups (the 1-8 IN, 1-12 IN, 1-22 IN, 2-39 IN and the 2-47 IN).

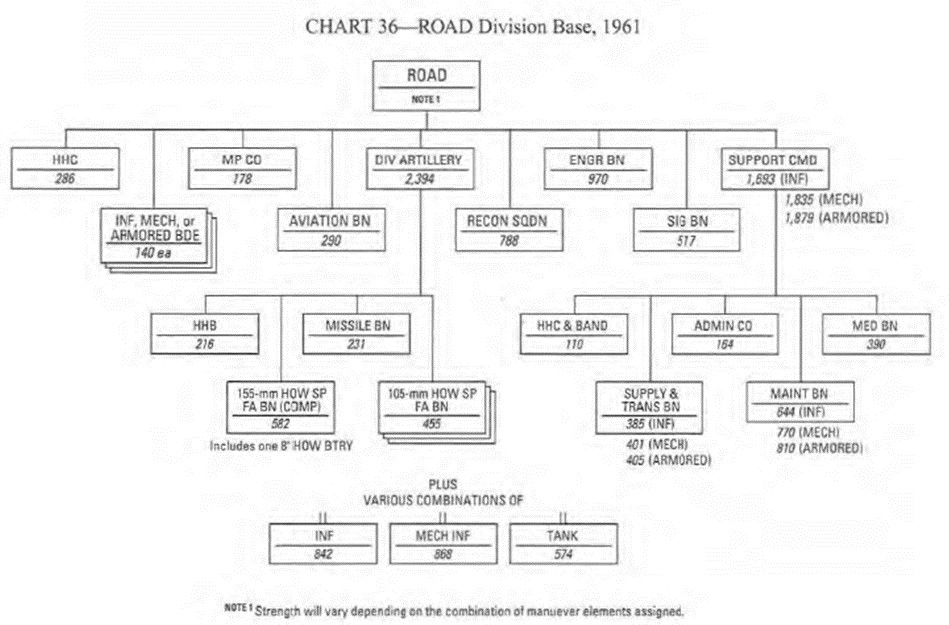
The standard organization chart for a ROAD division

On 1 October 1963, the division was reorganized as a Reorganization Objective Army Division (ROAD). Three Brigade Headquarters were activated and Infantry units were reorganized into battalions.

The 6th Tank Battalion of the 2d Armored Division, Fort Hood, Texas, was sent to Korea during the war to serve with the 24th Infantry Division. The lineages of the tank companies within the battalion are perpetuated by battalions of today's 66th and 67th Armor Regiments in the 4th Infantry Division.

=== Vietnam War ===
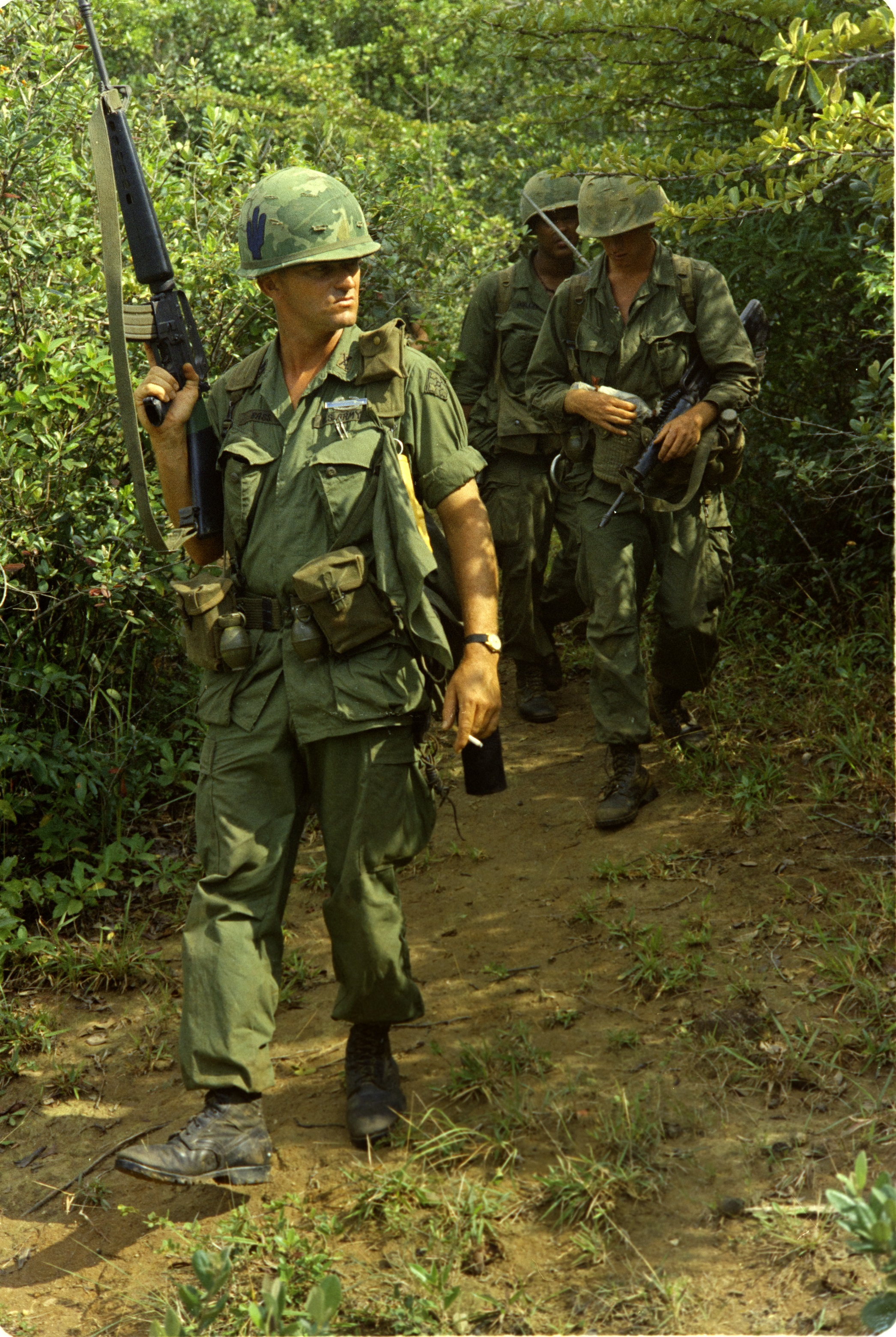
Soldiers from the 2nd Battalion, 35th Infantry Regiment in Quang Ngai Province during October 1967

The 4th Infantry Division deployed from Fort Lewis to Camp Enari, Pleiku, Vietnam on 25 September 1966 (The 2nd Brigade actually deployed on 21 July and arrived in Vietnam on August 2nd aboard the Nelson M Walker and was flown to Pleiku) and served more than four years, returning to Fort Carson, Colorado on 8 December 1970. Two brigades operated in the Central Highlands/II Corps Zone, but its 3rd Brigade, including the division's armor battalion, was sent to Tây Ninh Province northwest of Saigon to take part in Operation Attleboro (September to November 1966), and later Operation Junction City (February to May 1967), both in War Zone C. After nearly a year of combat, the 3rd Brigade's battalions officially became part of the 25th Infantry Division in exchange for the battalions of the 25th's 3rd Brigade, then in Quảng Ngãi Province as part of the division-sized Task Force Oregon.

==== Deployment table 1966–1970 ====
Location	Start	Finish
Pleiku & Tuy Hoa	Aug 1966	FEB 1968
Dak To	MAR 1968	APR 1968
Pleiku	APR 1968	FEB 1970
An Khe/Pleiku	APR 1970	APR 1970
An Khe	APR 1970	DEC 1970

Throughout its service in Vietnam the division conducted combat operations ranging from the western Central Highlands along the border between Cambodia and Vietnam to Qui Nhơn on the South China Sea. The division experienced intense combat against People's Army of Vietnam regular forces in the mountains surrounding Kontum in the autumn of 1967. The division's 3rd Brigade was withdrawn from Vietnam in April 1970 and inactivated at Fort Lewis.

In May the remainder of the division conducted cross-border operations during the Cambodian Incursion. The division then moved to An Khe. The "Ivy Division" returned from Vietnam on 7 December 1970, and was rejoined in Fort Carson by its former 3rd Brigade from Hawaii, where it had re-deployed as part of the withdrawal of the 25th Infantry Division. One battalion remained in Vietnam as a separate organization until January 1972.

==== Order of battle ====
- Division Headquarters and Headquarters Company (HHC)
- Division Support Command
  - Support Command HHC and Band
  - 4th Supply and Transportation Battalion
  - 4th Administration Company
  - 704th Maintenance Battalion
  - 4th Medical Battalion
  - 4th Infantry Division Band
- 1st Brigade
  - 1st Battalion, 8th Infantry ("Bullets")
  - 3rd Battalion, 8th Infantry ("Dragoons")
  - 3rd Battalion, 12th Infantry ("Braves")
- 2nd Brigade
  - 1st Battalion, 12th Infantry ("Red Warriors")
  - 1st Battalion, 22nd Infantry ("Regulars") (Separate from November 1970–January 1972)
  - 2nd Battalion, 8th Infantry ("Panthers") (Mechanized)
- 3rd Brigade (from 25th Infantry Division)
  - 1st Battalion, 14th Infantry ("Golden Dragons") (from 25th Infantry Division, August 1967–December 1970)
  - 1st Battalion, 35th Infantry ("Cacti Green") (from 25th Infantry Division, August 1967–April 1970)
  - 2nd Battalion, 35th Infantry ("Cacti Blue") (from 25th Infantry Division, August 1967–December 1970)
  - 1st Battalion, 69th Armor ("Black Panthers") (from 25th Infantry Division, August 1967–April 1970)
- 3rd Brigade (to 25th Infantry Division)
  - 2nd Battalion, 12th Infantry ("Lethal Warriors") (to 25th Infantry Division, August 1967–April 1971)
  - 2nd Battalion, 22nd Infantry (to 25th Infantry Division, August 1967–December 1970)
  - 3rd Battalion, 22nd Infantry (to 25th Infantry Division, August 1967–December 1970)
  - 2nd Battalion, 34th Armor ("Dreadnaughts") (to 25th Infantry Division, August 1967 – December 1970)
- Division Artillery
  - Headquarters and Headquarters Battery
  - 6th Battalion, 29th Artillery (105 mm) (1st Brigade)
  - 4th Battalion, 42nd Artillery (105 mm) (2nd Brigade)
  - 2nd Battalion, 9th Artillery (105 mm) (August 1967–April 1970) (from 3rd Brigade, 25th Infantry Division)
  - 2nd Battalion, 77th Artillery (105 mm) (to 25th Infantry Division, August 1967–December 1970)
  - 5th Battalion, 16th Artillery (155 mm/8 inch) (General support)
- 4th Military Police Company
- 4th Aviation Battalion
- 1st Squadron, 10th Cavalry Regiment ("Buffalo Soldiers")
- 4th Engineer Battalion
- 124th Signal Battalion

Attached units:

- 2nd Squadron, 1st Cavalry Regiment ("Blackhawks")
- 7th Squadron, 17th Cavalry Regiment ("Ruthless Riders")
- Company E, 20th Infantry (Long Range Patrol)
- Company E, 58th Infantry (Long Range Patrol)
- Company K (Ranger), 75th Infantry (Airborne)
- 43rd Chemical Detachment
- 374th Army Security Agency Company (In Vietnam as the 374th Radio Research Company)

==== Casualties ====
- 2,531 killed in action
- 15,229 wounded in action

=== Fort Carson, 1970 onwards ===
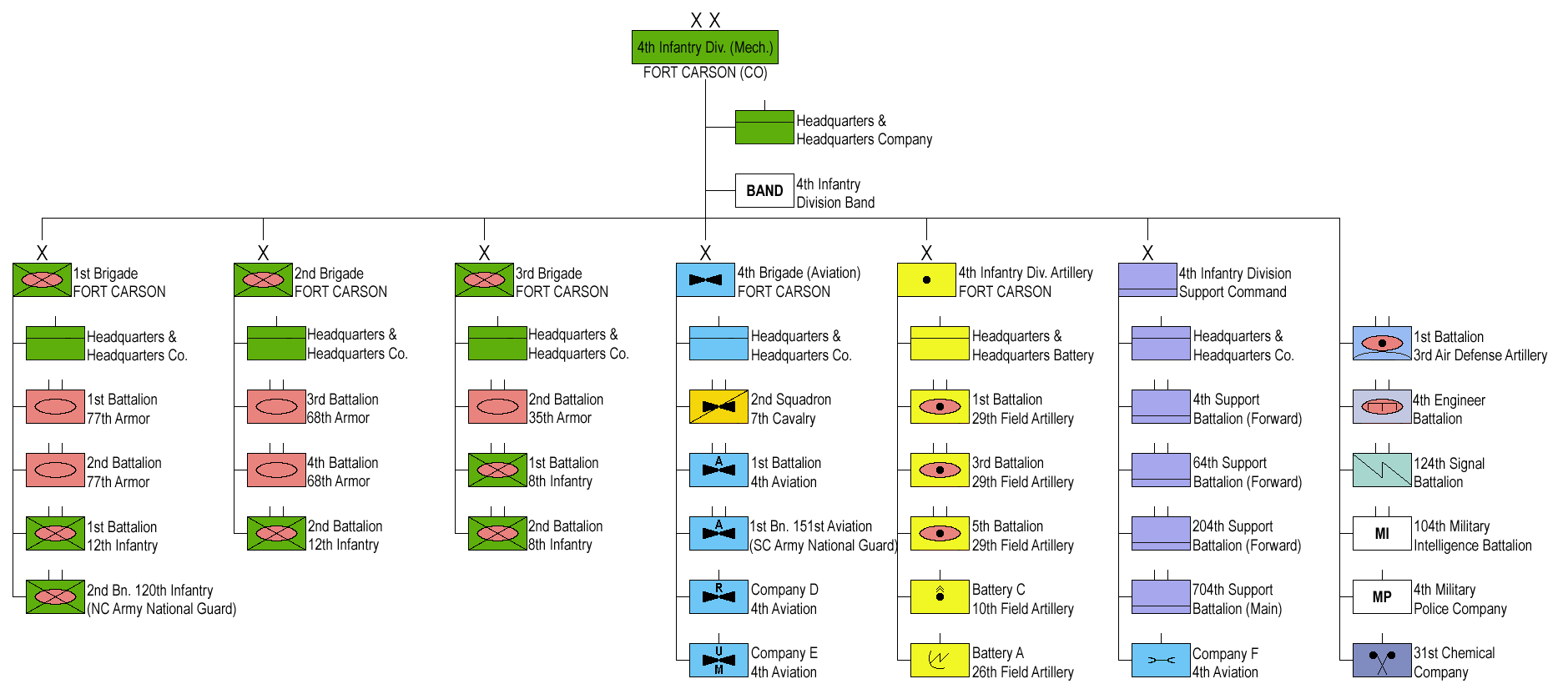
4th Infantry Division (Mechanized) structure 1989

In 1970, the division returned to the United States, (reflagged from the 5th Infantry Division) and resumed training and Cold War missions stationed at Fort Carson, Colorado through 1995. During this period, the division was converted to a mechanized infantry division, and frequently sent constituent units to Europe to participate in the annual REFORGER exercises to deterring Soviet/Warsaw Pact threats. In 1976 the division's 4th Brigade was established and permanently stationed forward at Wiesbaden, West Germany as Brigade 76. It was during their time in Fort Carson that the division assumed the nickname, "Ironhorse".

The 4th Brigade at Wiesbaden was deactivated in 1984 as part of the Army of Excellence Reorganization in United States Army Europe. Reassigning the personnel of the inactivated brigade meant that the remaining forces in Europe could be filled out, and reorganized in accordance with the "Division 86" table of organization and equipment. The process was expected to begin in April 1984, and, in the event, the brigade was inactivated in a ceremony at Wiesbaden Air Base on July 6, 1984.

=== Force XXI ===
In December 1995, the Ivy Division was reflagged at Ft Hood, Tx when the 2nd Armored Division was deactivated as part of the downsizing of the Army. One of the brigades remained at Ft Carson as 3rd Brigade 4th Infantry Division stationed at Ft Carson. The division became an experimental division of the Army, as it had been in the early 1940s. Until completing the mission in October 2001, 4ID led the Army into the 21st century under Force XXI, the Army's modernization program. The division tested and fielded state-of-the-art digital communications equipment, night fighting gear, advanced weaponry, organization, and doctrine to prepare the Army for the future.

From 1989 to 1996 the 116th Cavalry Brigade of the Idaho and Oregon Army National Guard served as roundout brigade of the division.

=== Iraq War ===
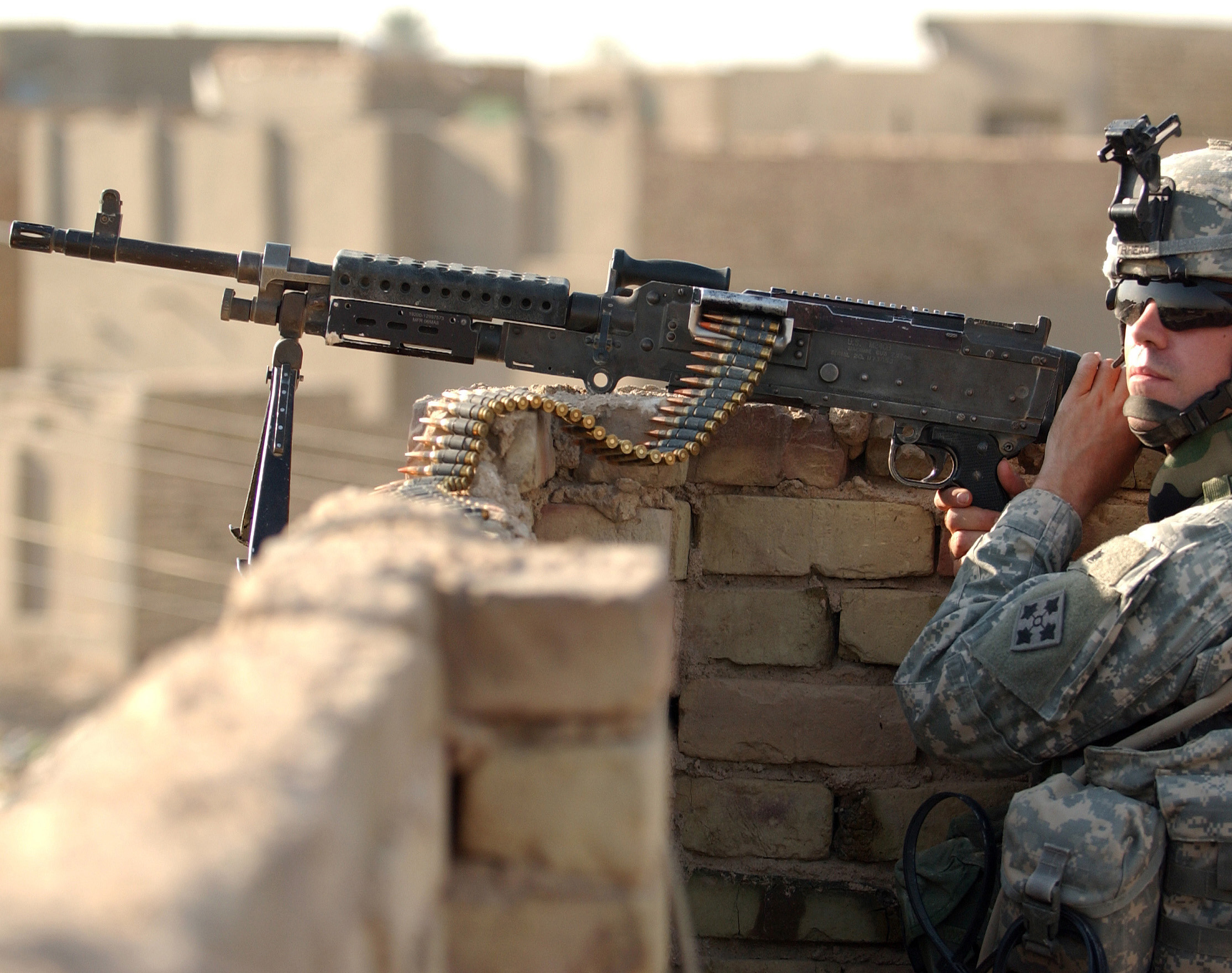
A 4th Infantry Division soldier manning an M240 machine gun in Iraq.

Alerted on 19 January 2003, the 4th Infantry Division was scheduled to take part in the Iraq War in the spring of 2003 by spearheading an advance from Turkey into northern Iraq. The deployment was going to involve over 80,000 troops. The Turkish Parliament refused to grant permission for the operation and the division's equipment remained offshore on ships during the buildup for the war. Its original mission, holding 13 Iraqi divisions along the "Green Line" in northern Iraq, was executed by joint Task Force Viking.

Order of battle ìn Iraq War:

1st Brigade (Raider)

1st Battalion, 8th Infantry Regiment (Mech) – Detached From 3rd Brigade
1st Battalion, 22nd Infantry Regiment (Mech)
1st Battalion, 66th Armor Regiment
3rd Battalion, 66th Armor Regiment
4th Battalion, 42nd Field Artillery Regiment (155SP)

2nd Brigade (WarHorse)

2nd Battalion, 8th Infantry Regiment (Mech)
1st Battalion, 67th Armor Regiment
3rd Battalion, 67th Armor Regiment
3rd Battalion, 16th Field Artillery Regiment (155SP)
1st Squadron, 10th Cavalry Regiment

3rd Brigade (Iron)

1st Battalion, 12th Infantry Regiment (Mech)
1st Battalion, 68th Armor Regiment
3rd Battalion, 29th Field Artillery Regiment (155SP)
4th Engineer Battalion
64th Forward Support Battalion

4th Infantry Division Artillery (DIVARTY)
1st Battalion, 44th Air Defense Artillery Regiment
2nd Battalion, 20th Field Artillery Regiment (MLRS)

The Turkish refusal to allow entrance to Turkey kept the division from participating in the invasion as originally planned, instead joining the fight as a follow-on force. After quickly organizing materiel and manpower at ports in Kuwait, the division moved to positions around Baghdad in April 2003. After all divisional assets were established in Iraq, the brigade combat teams attacked selected areas. The main avenues of attack for the division pushed north through Tikrit and Mosul. Headquartered in Saddam Hussein's former palaces, the 4th ID was deployed in the northern area of the Sunni Triangle. The 4th Infantry Division was spread all over Northern Iraq from Kirkuk to the Iranian border and as far south as Al Wihda, southeast of Baghdad.

The division headquarters was located at FOB Ironhorse in the old Saddam Presidential Complex in Tikrit, while the 1st Brigade Combat Team headquarters was at FOB Raider south of the city. To the south in the volatile Diyala Province was the 2nd Brigade Combat Team headquarters at FOB Warhorse just northeast of Baqubah. The 3rd Brigade Combat Team was at FOB Anaconda at the Balad Air Base northwest of Khalis and DIVARTY, along with elements of the 1st Battalion, 44th Air Defense Artillery Regiment at FOB Gunner, Al Taji airfield. To the far north stationed at an air field just on the outskirts of the city of Kirkuk were elements of the division's 4th Artillery Brigade and attached units, until mid-September when it was moved back to Tikrit. The 4th Infantry Division also disarmed the MEK warriors in Northern Iraq in July–August 2003.

On 13 December 2003, elements of the 1st Brigade Combat Team participated in Operation Red Dawn with United States special operations forces, who captured Saddam Hussein, former President of Iraq.

The division rotated out of Iraq in the spring of 2004, and was relieved by the 1st Infantry Division.

Some have been critical of the division under its then-commander Maj. Gen. Raymond T. Odierno, calling its stance belligerent during their initial entry into Iraq after the ground war had ceased and arguing that the unit's lack of a 'hearts and minds' approach was ineffective in quelling the insurgency. In his unit's defense, Odierno and others have argued that enemy activity in the 4th ID's area of operations was higher than in any other area of the country because of the region's high concentration of Sunni resistance groups still loyal to Saddam Hussein's regime. His unit was headquartered in Hussein's hometown and this environment necessitated a different approach from those of units located in the more peaceful regions in the south and the north of the country.

==== Significant OIF I operations ====
M109A6 Paladin howitzer artillery crews assigned to Alpha Battery, 3rd Battalion, 29th Field Artillery Regiment, 3rd ABCT, 4th ID, perform live fire training at Forward Operating Site Ādaži, Latvia, July 26, 2022

- Operation Planet X (15 May 2003)
- Operation Peninsula Strike (9 June 2003 – 12 June 2003)
- Operation Desert Scorpion (15 June 2003 – 29 June 2003)
- Operation Sidewinder (29 June 2003 – 7 July 2003)
- Operation Soda Mountain (12 July 2003 – 17 July 2003)
- Operation Ivy Serpent (12 July 2003 – 21 July 2003)
- Operation Ivy Lightning (12 August 2003)
- Operation Ivy Needle (26 August 2003)
- Operation Industrial Sweep (October 2003)
- Operation Ivy Cyclone (7 November 2003)
- Operation Ivy Cyclone II (17 November 2003)
- Operation Red Dawn (13 December 2003)
- Operation Ivy Blizzard (17 December 2003)
- Operation Arrowhead Blizzard (17 December 2003)
- Operation Rifles Fury (21 December 2003)

==== Subsequent Iraq Deployments ====
The division's second deployment to Iraq began in the fall of 2005. The division headquarters replaced the 3rd Infantry Division, which had been directing security operations as the headquarters for Multi-National Division – Baghdad. The 4th ID assumed responsibility on 7 January 2006 for four provinces in central and southern Iraq: Baghdad, Karbala, An-Najaf and Babil. On 7 January 2006, MND-Baghdad also assumed responsibility for training Iraqi security forces and conducting security operations in the four provinces.

During the second deployment, 3rd Brigade of the 4th Infantry Division area of operation (AO) was Saladin and Diala provinces and was assigned to conduct security and training operations under the command of Task Force Band of Brothers, led initially by the 101st Airborne Division (Air Assault) and later 25th Infantry Division Headquartered out of FOB Warhorse. Later during the third deployment the unit was involved in the 2008 Battle of Sadr City.

In March 2008 the 1st Brigade Combat Team deployed to Iraq and was stationed in Baghdad. The 1st Battalion, 66th Armor Regiment was detached from the brigade and attached to the 4th Brigade, 10th Mountain Division which was stationed at FOB Rustamiyah in Al Amin, Baghdad. The brigade returned home to Fort Hood, Texas in March 2009 and immediately began preparing for reassignment to Fort Carson, Colorado.

In these three deployments to Iraq:

- 84 4ID/Task Force Ironhorse soldiers were killed in 2003–2004
- 235 4ID/Multi-National Division – Baghdad soldiers lost their lives in 2005–2006
- 113 4ID/Multi-National Division – Baghdad soldiers were killed in 2007–2009

July 2009 saw another division change of command as MG David Perkins took command to become the 56th Commanding General of the 4th Infantry Division. With this change of command, even more significant events happened as the 4ID completed 14 years calling Fort Hood, TX home and returned to Fort Carson, CO, where they had served from late 1970 through late 1995. It was at this time that the 4th Division headquarters and the 1st Brigade Combat Team transferred to Fort Carson, Colorado. The 2nd, and 4th Brigades had already relocated and 3rd Brigade was already at Fort Carson having never moved to Fort Hood and the 4th Infantry Division's Aviation Brigade stayed at Fort Hood, Texas.

The 3rd Brigade of the 4th Infantry Division deployed to southern Iraq from March 2010 to March 2011 in support of Operations Iraqi Freedom and New Dawn in an “Advise and Assist” role. 3rd Brigade Soldiers served alongside 50,000+ other U.S. service members under the command of United States Forces- Iraq. Soldiers from the brigade assisted in the training and preparation of Iraqi forces tasked with taking over responsibility of the southern sector of Iraq after U.S. forces were expected to withdraw from the area. 3rd Brigade Soldiers were re-flagged from being designated as a “Brigade Combat Team” and instead were reassigned as an “Advise and Assist” Brigade. The brigade fought Iraqi insurgents in the southern sector Area Of Operation (A.O.) in Iraq. The 3rd Brigade returned to Fort Carson in March 2011.

=== War in Afghanistan ===
In May 2009 the 4th Brigade Combat Team deployed in support of Operation Enduring Freedom X for a 12-month combat rotation. The 1st Battalion 12th Infantry Regiment deployed to Regional Command South. Task Force 1-12 operated in Maiwand district and Zhari district, namely the Arghandab River Valley, west of Kandahar City. Referred to as "The Heart of Darkness" for its notoriety as the birthplace of the Taliban, the soldiers of Task Force 1-12 operated in a very complex combat environment.

Much of the fighting was conducted in notoriously dense grape fields, which insurgent forces used as cover and concealment for a variety of complex attacks on coalition forces. The 2nd Battalion 12th Infantry Regiment deployed in to Regional Command East and was based in the Pech River Valley, Kunar Province, home to the Korangal Valley, Waygal, Shuriak, and Wata Pour Valleys. During its rotation, the 2nd Battalion saw heavy combat throughout the area.

The 3rd Squadron 61st Cavalry Regiment was also deployed to Regional Command East and served during its rotation in Kunar and Nuristan Provinces. Task Force Destroyer saw intense combat, namely the Battle of Kamdesh in which a combat outpost was attacked by over 300 insurgents in a complex attack 20 miles from the Pakistan border. For their bravery, on October 3, 2009, Bravo Troop 3-61 Cavalry became the most decorated unit of the Afghanistan War. The Battle of Kamdesh was the first in 50 years in which the Medal of Honor was given to two living servicemen.

Some reports indicate that the US soldiers of 4th ID did not maintain their efforts in the fight and withdrew inside of buildings to wait for QRF to arrive from elements of 10th Mountain Division. In May 2010, elements of the 4th Brigade Combat Team began to redeploy to Fort Carson and immediately began assisting and training sister units for future contingency operations, as well as training for its own future combat deployments. 38 soldiers from the brigade died during the deployment. For its actions 4th Brigade Combat Team was awarded the Valorous Unit Award, the second highest unit decoration awarded to United States Army units.

Upon 4BCT redeploying to Fort Carson, the rest of the division was set to deploy to Afghanistan. The 1st and 2nd Brigade Combat Teams also served in Afghanistan building on the efforts that were initiated by 4BCT. The 4th BCT has once again deployed in an advise and assist capacity, fulfilling the mission of training and preparing the Afghan Security Forces for the handover of all combat operations in the upcoming years.

The 1st and 2nd Brigade Combat Teams deployed to Afghanistan in support of Operation Freedom's Sentinel in 2017.

=== Operation Inherent Resolve ===
Soldiers assigned to the 4th Infantry Division completed a nine-month deployment to Iraq in 2015, in support of Operation Inherent Resolve. This operation supported the military intervention against the Islamic State of Iraq and the Levant.

In February 2015, troops from the division's 3rd Armored Brigade Combat Team were deployed to Southwest Asia in support of Operation Inherent Resolve in Iraq and Syria.

In September 2021, troops from the division's 1st Stryker Brigade Combat Team deployed to Erbil Air Base in Iraq following base closures for Operation Inherent Resolve.

=== Operation Freedom's Sentinel ===
In October 2015, the US Army announced that 1,000 troops from 4th Infantry Division's Combat Aviation Brigade would be sent to Afghanistan sometime in winter, with another 1,800 soldiers from the 4th ID's 2nd Infantry Brigade Combat Team deploying to Afghanistan in the spring 2016. On 12 August 2016, a U.S. Soldier from 1st Battalion, 12th Infantry Regiment, 2nd Brigade Combat Team, 4th ID died from a noncombat-related injury in Kandahar.

=== Operation Atlantic Resolve ===
On 3 November 2016, the U.S. Army deployed some 4,000 soldiers from 3rd Armored Brigade Combat Team to Europe in winter in support of Operation Atlantic Resolve - to help deter possible Russian aggression. The brigade will arrive in Poland and will fan out across the continent, one battalion with M1 Abrams tanks will cover the Baltic region of Estonia and Latvia, while another will operate in Germany. A mechanized infantry battalion with M2 Bradley troop carriers and M1 Abrams tanks will have a foothold in the Romanian and Bulgarian region, whilst brigade headquarters will remain in Poland, along with an armored cavalry unit and a field artillery battalion wielding self-propelled M109 Paladin howitzers.

On December 5, 2025, the Department of the Army announced the reassignment of the division from the III Armored Corps to I Corps. While the division headquarters and its brigades remain stationed at Fort Carson, Colorado, the division now falls under the control of I Corps at Joint Base Lewis-McChord in Washington State, to support U.S. Army operations in the Indo-Pacific theater.

== Division organization ==
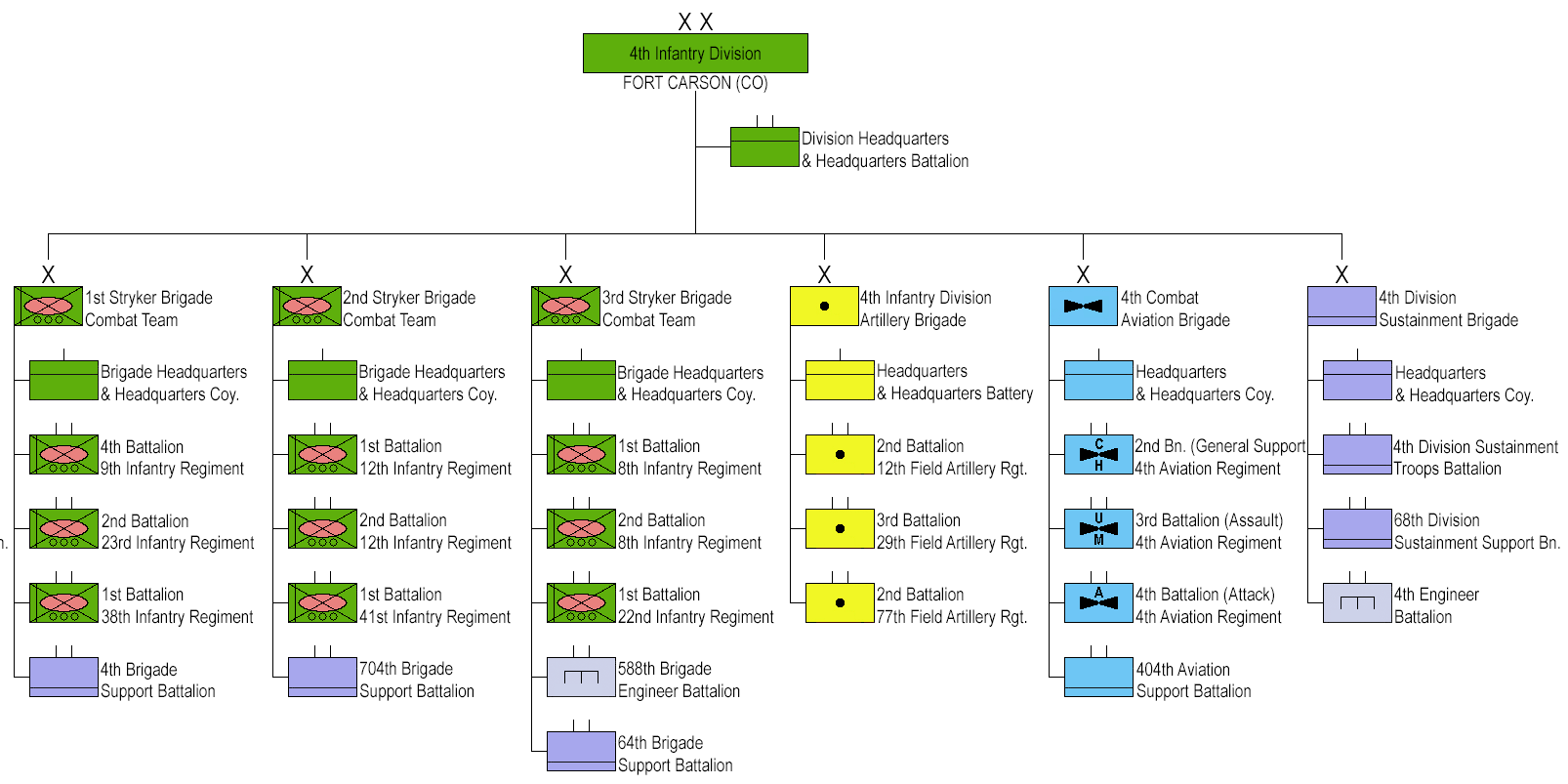
4th Infantry Division organization as of October 2026

The 4th Infantry Division consists of a division headquarters battalion, three brigade combat teams, a division artillery, a combat aviation brigade, and a division sustainment brigade:

- 4th Infantry Division, at Fort Carson, Colorado
  - Division Headquarters and Headquarters Battalion
  - 1st Stryker Brigade Combat Team (Raiders)
    - Headquarters and Headquarters Company
    - 4th Battalion, 9th Infantry Regiment (Manchu)
    - 2nd Battalion, 23rd Infantry Regiment (Tomahawks)
    - 1st Battalion, 38th Infantry Regiment (Rock of the Marne)
    - 4th Brigade Support Battalion (Packhorse)
  - 2nd Stryker Brigade Combat Team (Mountain Warrior)
    - Headquarters and Headquarters Company (Mountain GOAT)
    - 1st Battalion, 12th Infantry Regiment (Red Warriors)
    - 2nd Battalion, 12th Infantry Regiment (Lethal Warriors)
    - 1st Battalion, 41st Infantry Regiment (Straight and Stalwart)
    - 704th Brigade Support Battalion (Blacksmiths)
  - 3rd Stryker Brigade Combat Team
    - Headquarters and Headquarters Company
    - 1st Battalion, 8th Infantry Regiment
    - 2nd Battalion, 8th Infantry Regiment
    - 1st Battalion, 22nd Infantry Regiment
    - 64th Brigade Support Battalion (Mountaineers)
  - 4th Infantry Division Artillery
    - Headquarters and Headquarters Battery, 4th Division Artillery
    - 2nd Battalion, 12th Field Artillery Regiment (Viking)
    - 3rd Battalion, 29th Field Artillery Regiment (Pacesetters)
    - 2nd Battalion, 77th Field Artillery Regiment (Steel)
  - 4th Combat Aviation Brigade (Ivy Eagles)
    - Headquarters and Headquarters Company
    - 2nd Battalion (General Support), 4th Aviation Regiment
    - 3rd Battalion (Assault), 4th Aviation Regiment
    - 4th Battalion (Attack), 4th Aviation Regiment
    - 404th Aviation Support Battalion
  - 4th Infantry Division Sustainment Brigade
    - 4th Division Sustainment Troops Battalion
    - 68th Division Sustainment Support Battalion
    - 4th Engineer Battalion

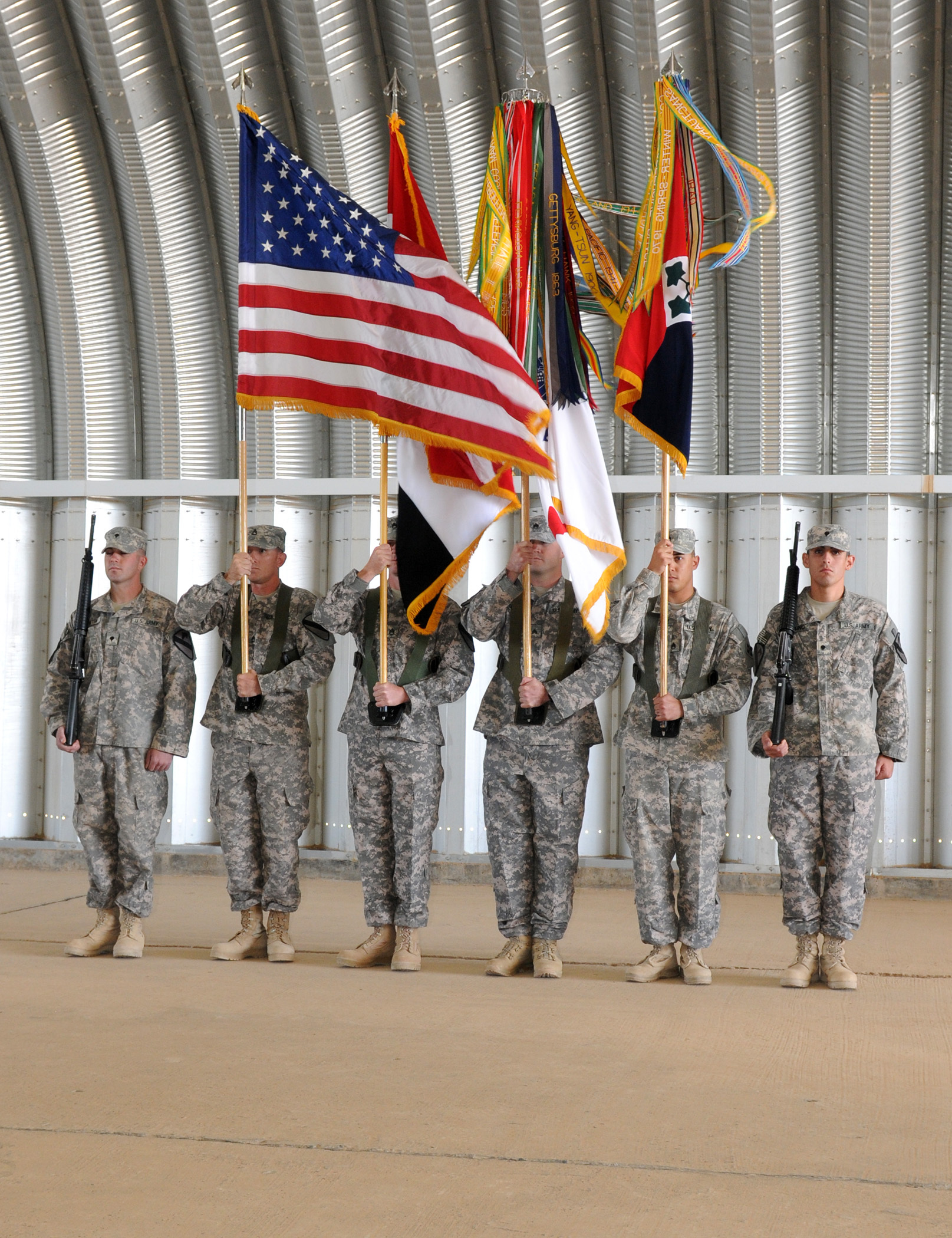
A color guard of the 4th Infantry Division preparing to post the colors.

== Honors ==
=== Campaign participation credit ===
- World War I:
1. Aisne-Marne;
2. Saint-Mihiel;
3. Meuse-Argonne;
4. Champagne 1918;
5. Lorraine 1918
- World War II:
1. Normandy (with arrowhead) (Except 3rd Brigade);
2. Northern France (Except 3rd Brigade);
3. Rhineland (Except 3rd Brigade);
4. Ardennes-Alsace (Except 3rd Brigade);
5. Central Europe (Except 3rd Brigade);
- Vietnam:
1. Counteroffensive, Phase II;
2. Counteroffensive, Phase III;
3. Tet Counteroffensive;
4. Counteroffensive, Phase IV;
5. Counteroffensive, Phase V;
6. Counteroffensive, Phase VI;
7. Tet 69/Counteroffensive;
8. Summer-Fall 1969;
9. Winter-Spring 1970;
10. Sanctuary Counteroffensive (Except 3rd Brigade);
11. Counteroffensive, Phase VII (Except 3rd Brigade).
- Operation Iraqi Freedom:
1. Liberation of Iraq – 19 March 2003 to 1 May 2003.
2. Transition of Iraq – 2 May 2003 to 28 June 2004.
3. Iraqi Governance – 29 June 2004 to 15 December 2005.
4. National Resolution – 16 December 2005 to 9 January 2007.
5. Iraqi Surge - 10 January 2007 to 18 December 2008.
6. Iraqi Sovereignty – 1 January 2009 to 31 August 2010.
7. Operation New Dawn – 1 September 2010 to 31 December 2011.
- Operation Enduring Freedom (Afghanistan):
1. Consolidation II – 1 October 2006 to 30 November 2009.
2. Consolidation III – 1 December 2009 to 30 June 2011.
3. Transition I – 1 July 2011 to 31 December 2014.
- Operation Inherent Resolve – 15 June 2014 - TBD.

=== Decorations ===
1. Presidential Unit Citation (Army) for PLEIKU PROVINCE (1st Brigade Only)
2. Presidential Unit Citation (Army) for DAK TO DISTRICT (1st Brigade Only)
3. Presidential Unit Citation (Army) for SUOI TRE (3rd Brigade Only)
4. Meritorious Unit Award (Army) for IRAQ 2013-14 (Division HQ)
5. Meritorious Unit Award (Army) for IRAQ 2010-11 (Division HQ)
6. Meritorious Unit Award (Army) for IRAQ 2007-09 (Division HQ)
7. Meritorious Unit Award (Army) for IRAQ 2005-06 (Division HQ)
8. Army Superior Unit Award (Selected Units) for Force XXI Test and Evaluation (1995–1996)
9. Belgian Fourragere 1940
10. Cited in the Order of the Day of the Belgian Army for action in BELGIUM
11. Cited in the Order of the Day of the Belgian Army for action in the ARDENNES
12. Republic of Vietnam Cross of Gallantry with Palm for VIETNAM 1966–1969
13. Republic of Vietnam Cross of Gallantry with Palm for VIETNAM 1969–1970
14. Republic of Vietnam Civil Action Honor Medal, First Class for VIETNAM 1966–1969

=== Medal of Honor recipients ===
==== World War I ====
- William Shemin (posthumously in 2015)

==== World War II ====
- Pedro Cano (posthumously)
- Marcario Garcia
- George L. Mabry, Jr.
- Bernard J. Ray (posthumously)
- Theodore Roosevelt Jr. (posthumously)

==== Vietnam War ====
- Leslie Allen Bellrichard (posthumously)
- Thomas W. Bennett (posthumously)
- Donald W. Evans, Jr. (posthumously)
- Bruce Alan Grandstaff (posthumously)
- Dwight H. Johnson
- Phill G. McDonald (posthumously)
- David H. McNerney
- Ferenc Zoltán Molnár (posthumously)
- Anund C. Roark (posthumously)
- Elmelindo R. Smith (posthumously)
- Louis E. Willett (posthumously)

==== Afghanistan War ====
- Clinton L. Romesha
- Ty Carter
- Florent A. Groberg

== In popular culture ==
- 4th Infantry Division's shoulder patch—the Ivy Patch, is worn as a combat patch by two characters in the 1986 Vietnam War movie Platoon, by Sgt. Warren, portrayed by Tony Todd, and by Capt. Harris, portrayed by Dale Dye.
- 4th Infantry Division has been mentioned in The Last of Us: Left Behind.
- 4th Infantry Division was featured in the film, The Longest Day.
- 4th Infantry Division soldiers appear in the film Is Paris Burning.
- Detective Joss Carter on the CBS television action drama Person of Interest (TV series), is said to have been a senior military interrogator with the 4th Infantry Division while serving in Afghanistan. It is mentioned three times during the character's series run. Carter was portrayed by actress Taraji P. Henson.
- Some of the soldiers & National Guardsmen in the Walking Dead are implied to be in this unit.
