= Bruce Alan Grandstaff =

- Army Medal of Honor
- Born: June 2, 1934; Spokane, Washington, US
- Died: May 18, 1967 (aged 32); Pleiku Province, Republic of Vietnam
- Burial place: Greenwood Memorial Terrace, Spokane, Washington
- Military career
- Allegiance: United States of America
- Branch: United States Army
- Service years: 1954–1957; 1961-1967
- Rank: Sergeant First Class
- Units: Weapons Platoon, Company B, 1st Battalion, 8th Infantry Regiment, 4th Infantry Division
- Conflicts: Vietnam War †
- Awards: Medal of Honor; Silver Star; Purple Heart

Bruce Alan Grandstaff (June 2, 1934 – May 18, 1967) was a United States Army soldier and a recipient of the United States military's highest decoration—the Medal of Honor—for his actions in the Vietnam War.

== Biography ==
Born in Spokane, Washington, Grandstaff attended Garfield Grade School and graduated from North Central High School class of 1952. He first joined the Army in 1954, & was stationed in Fort Ord and Fort Lewis before being discharged in 1957. Afterwards, he returned to Spokane where he married & had two daughters.

But in November 1961, deciding to become a career soldier, he reenlisted and by May 18, 1967, was a Sergeant First Class serving as a platoon sergeant in Company B, 1st Battalion, 8th Infantry Regiment, 4th Infantry Division. During a firefight on that day during Operation Francis Marion in Pleiku Province, South Vietnam, Grandstaff showed conspicuous leadership before being fatally wounded. He was posthumously awarded the Medal of Honor on July 10, 1969 for his heroic actions.

Grandstaff, aged 32 at his death, was buried at Greenwood Memorial Terrace in his hometown of Spokane, Washington.

== Medal of Honor citation ==
Platoon Sergeant Grandstaff's official Medal of Honor citation reads:

For conspicuous gallantry and intrepidity in action at the risk of his life above and beyond the call of duty. P/Sgt. Grandstaff distinguished himself while leading the Weapons Platoon, Company B, on a reconnaissance mission near the Cambodian border. His platoon was advancing through intermittent enemy contact when it was struck by heavy small arms and automatic weapons fire from 3 sides surrounded by nearly 700 enemy forces. As he established a defensive perimeter, P/Sgt. Grandstaff noted that several of his men had been struck down. He raced 30 meters through the intense fire to aid them. Denied freedom to maneuver his unit by the intensity of the enemy onslaught, he adjusted artillery to within 45 meters of his position. When helicopter gunships arrived, he crawled outside the defensive position to mark the location with smoke grenades. Realizing his first marker was probably ineffective, he crawled to another location and threw his last smoke grenade but the smoke did not penetrate the triple canopy jungle foliage. Seriously wounded in the leg during this effort he returned to his radio and, refusing medical aid, adjusted the artillery even closer as the enemy advanced on his position. Recognizing the need for additional firepower, he again braved the enemy fusillade, crawled to the edge of his position and fired several magazines of tracer ammunition through the jungle canopy. He succeeded in designating the location to the gunships but this action again drew enemy fire and he was wounded in the other leg. Now enduring intense pain and bleeding profusely, he crawled to within 10 meters of an enemy machine gun which had caused many casualties among his men. He destroyed the position with hand grenades but received additional wounds. Rallying his remaining men to withstand the enemy assaults, he realized his position was being overrun and called for artillery directly on his location. The survivors recalled Grandstaff communicating ferociously back and forth with the enemy in close range combat before being mortally wounded by a rocket. The magnitude of his actions gave notice to Companies A and C of the large presence of enemy numbers in their midst. A rescue force the next day confirmed that Grandstaff’s platoon had suffered 22 dead and eight wounded. The survivors had played dead when the North Vietnamese regulars searched their bodies for souvenirs and weapons. Private First Class Clifford A. Roundtree (b. 1947) said that he lay with his face in the mud faking death as enemy soldiers emptied his pockets. Private First Class Roundtree and other survivors spoke of Platoon Sergeant Grandstaff as an inspiration and fearless leader. He was older than his troops and a father figure to them and in battle a soldier who refused to give up. Survivors attested to the indomitable spirit and exceptional courage of this outstanding combat leader who inspired his men to fight courageously against overwhelming odds and cost the enemy heavy casualties. P/Sgt. Grandstaff's selfless gallantry, above and beyond the call of duty, are in the highest traditions of the U.S. Army and reflect great credit upon himself and the Armed Forces of this country.

== Grandstaff Library ==
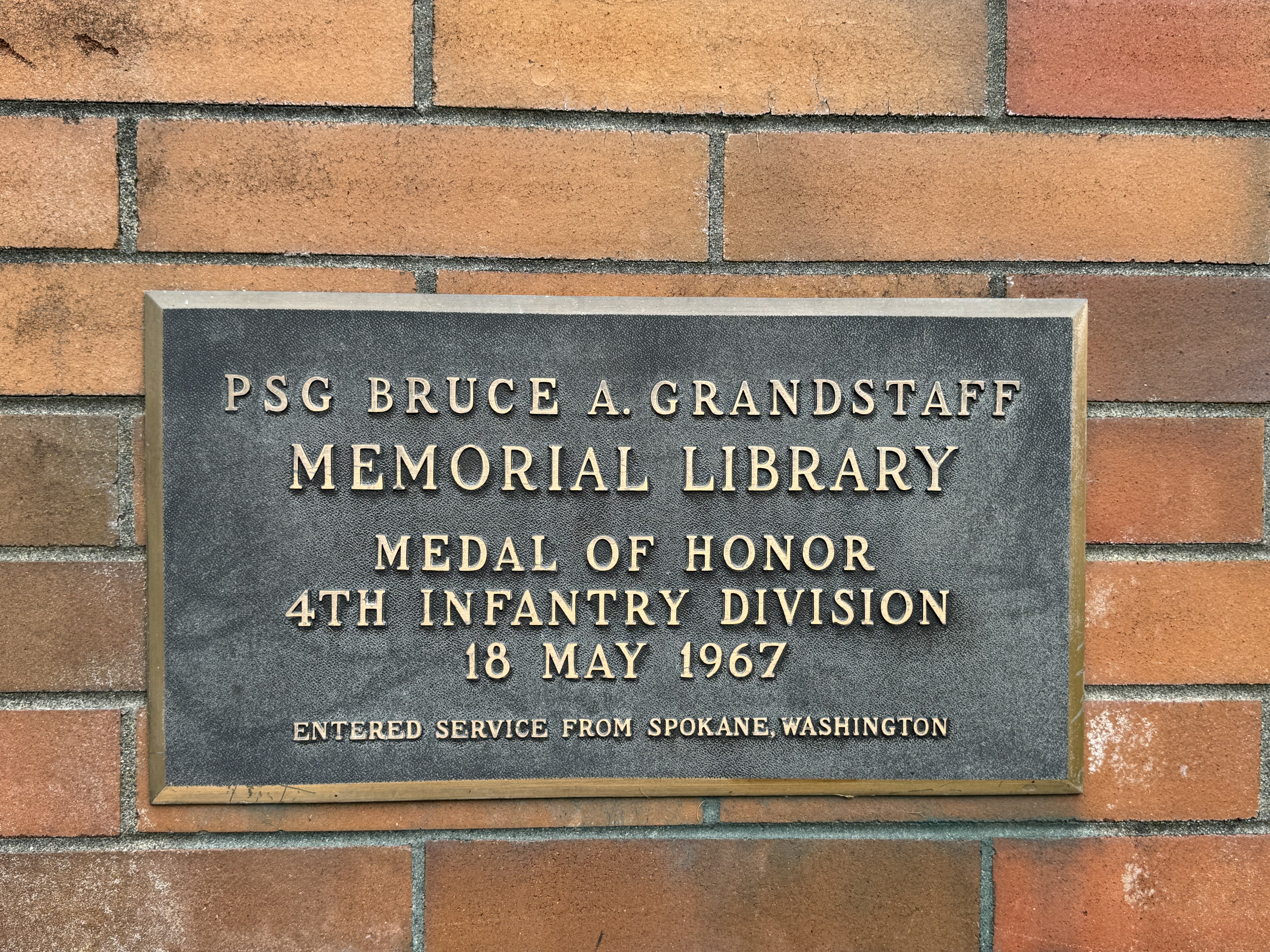
Plaque attached to Grandstaff Library dedicating the library to PSG Bruce A. Grandstaff

On October 7, 1971, the library at Fort Lewis (now Joint-Base Lewis McChord) was dedicated the PSG Bruce A. Grandstaff Memorial Library. In 2020, the library won the Federal Library/Information Center of the Year-Large award from the Federal Library and Information Network (FEDLINK) division of The Library of Congress.

== See also ==
- List of Medal of Honor recipients for the Vietnam War
