= Operation Coronado X =

Part of the Vietnam War (1968)

- Part of Tet Offensive, Vietnam War
Date	23 January – 12 February 1968
Location	Mỹ Tho and Vĩnh Long, South Vietnam
Result	Allied operational success

Belligerents
United States; South Vietnam	Viet Cong

Commanders and leaders
William B. Fulton; George S. Eckhardt; Burt A. David	Unknown

Units involved
3rd Battalion, 47th Infantry Regiment; 4th Battalion, 47th Infantry Regiment; 3rd Battalion, 60th Infantry Regiment	261st Battalion; 263rd Battalion; 306th Battalion; 308th Battalion; 514th Battalion; 857th Battalion; 207th Sapper Company; 530th District Company; 540th District Company

Casualties and losses
12 killed	US body count: 269 killed

Operation Coronado X was the tenth of the Operation Coronado series of riverine military operations conducted by the U.S. Mobile Riverine Force (MRF) and units of the Army of the Republic of Vietnam (ARVN), originally planned as a sweep of western Dinh Tuong Province and eastern Kien Phong Province, however with the outbreak of the Tet Offensive on 31 January 1968 it instead became the MRF reaction to eject Vietcong (VC) forces from Mỹ Tho and Vĩnh Long. It ran from 23 January to 12 February 1968 and resulted in 269 VC killed for the loss of 12 U.S. killed.

== Background ==
Shortly before the beginning of the three-day cease-fire declared by the government of South Vietnam to celebrate Tết, the lunar new year, the MRF was ordered to the western portion of Dinh Tuong Province and the eastern part of Kien Phong Province to attack VC Base Area 470 and to prevent the VC from using communication routes running east and southeast through the area. There had been continuous and credible intelligence reports of VC activity within the area, which was readily accessible to assault craft. The MRF planned to establish bases along the waterways to provide fire support as it had done during Operation Coronado IX in the preceding November and December. The operation began with the movement north by stages of supporting artillery batteries: as each battery moved, an infantry unit was sent ahead to secure the next fire support base. Four bases were established, three of them north along the Rach Ruong Canal from the Mỹ Tho River to an agroville, one of the many agricultural resettlement areas established by former President Ngo Dinh Diem. Three CH-47 helicopters were used to set down the artillery on the agroville site and the battery was ready to fire by 18:00 on 29 January 1968, the beginning of the Tết truce. The fourth base was on Highway 4, about 2 km north of the river. The MRF elements met only sporadic sniper fire on the 29th although the CH-47s were fired upon with .51-caliber machine guns.

The brigade's two battalions, in addition to defending the firebases, actively patrolled the area of operations. Surveillance was aided by the radars mounted on the Assault Support Patrol Boats (ASPBs). At 21:00 on 29 January, 15 rounds of 82mm mortar fire were received at one fire support base without causing casualties or damage. No further VC activity occurred during the remainder of the evening of 29 January and the MRF dispersed to ambush positions to prevent major VC movement.

== Operation ==
On 25 January 1968, the senior adviser of IV Corps Major general George S. Eckhardt warned all subordinate elements in IV Corps that during the impending Tết holiday ceasefire period, the VC were expected to resupply and move into position for a post Tết offensive. The warning was based on past experience and recent intelligence reports. At about 10:00 on 30 January, the MRF was informed that the Military Assistance Command, Vietnam (MACV) had cancelled Tết truce because of VC attacks on towns and cities in the northern three Corps. The MRF was directed to resume offensive operations "with particular attention to the defense of the Headquarters complexes, logistical installations, airfields, population centers and billets." The MRF ordered an increased reconnaissance in force within the original area of operations, but the infantry was directed to operate close to the major waterways to make feasible a rapid move by watercraft towards the population centers. While two companies of the 3rd Battalion, 47th Infantry Regiment remained to provide security for the firebases, the rest of 3rd Battalion and the 3rd Battalion, 60th Infantry Regiment conducted saturation patrolling to the east towards Cái Bè District. At the end of the day, 40 suspects had been detained, 40 bunkers destroyed and several small caches found.

On 31 January the VC attacked 13 of the 16 provincial capitals in the Mekong Delta and captured large sections of Mỹ Tho, Cai Lậy, Bến Tre, Cái Bè and Vĩnh Long. The VC units involved at Mỹ Tho included the 261st, 263rd and 514th Battalions and the 207th Sapper Company, at Vĩnh Long the 306th, 308th and 857th Battalions and local forces, at Cái Bè and Cai Lậy the 261st Main Force Battalion supported by the 530th and 540th District Companies and local forces. The MRF had not found any VC in the populated area along the Rach Ruong, but when they moved to return to the Mỹ Tho River local VC attempted to prevent this. However, the MRF was able to return to their base by 02:20 on 1 February. After less than 4 hours rest, the MRF were ordered to conduct operations in the vicinity of Cái Bè.

When Eckhardt conferred with II Field Force, Vietnam commander Lieutenant general Frederick C. Weyand on the afternoon of 31 January they agreed that Mỹ Tho, Bến Tre and Vĩnh Long City needed urgent assistance. The other regional capitals were doing better. COMUSMACV General William Westmoreland directed Weyand to send whatever elements of the 9th Infantry Division in III Corps that he could spare to join Colonel Burt A. David's 2nd Brigade and the MRF without delay. Until the crisis passed, Westmoreland placed the augmented MRF under Eckhardt's tactical command.

Before the Cái Bè landing could be executed, orders were changed by Eckhardt and the MRF was diverted to Mỹ Tho where Allied forces were still heavily engaged. Elements of the two battalions were landed by water craft in Mỹ Tho at 15:20, 1 February. The five major ships of the Mobile Riverine Base moved from Vĩnh Long to Dong Tam Base Camp in order to be in a better position to support operations.

=== Mỹ Tho ===
At Mỹ Tho, an estimated 1,200 VC entered the city while another battalion stood in reserve on the outskirts. The only defenders in the city were a squadron of the Army of the Republic of Vietnam (ARVN) 6th Armored Cavalry and one battalion of the 11th Infantry Regiment both from the 7th Division, supplemented by Republic of Vietnam Navy River Assault Group (RAG) units and U.S. Navy personnel based in the city. As in most other Tết attacks, this one began with mortar and rocket fire followed by a ground assault led by the sapper company. Once inside Mỹ Tho, the VC vanguard linked up with guerrillas who had infiltrated the city in the days leading up to Tết. These infiltrators served as guides for the main force units, pointing out predetermined targets and fighting positions. Propaganda teams then came in and attempted to win over the local populace to the VC cause.

President Nguyễn Văn Thiệu was still at his family home in the middle of town, and presently unable to leave the city. A VC sapper team had broken into the home of General Nguyễn Viết Thanh, the commander of the ARVN 7th Division, who had spent the night at his headquarters. Thanh tried to recall several infantry battalions from nearby Revolutionary Development areas to mount a counterattack.

At approximately 15:00 on 1 February Company B, 3/47th Infantry was landed by helicopters on the waterfront just south of the Provincial headquarters. They then secured landing sites on the southwestern edge of the city for its parent battalion and were joined by Companies A and C. Once ashore, David and his battalion commanders received an update from the Province chief. The central part of the city, bordered by the Cung Canal on the west and the Bảo Định Canal to the east and north, was mostly under government control, but the western suburbs, a residential area sandwiched between the Cung Canal and the base camp of the ARVN 7th Division, remained in the hands of the 216A and 514th Local Force Battalions. The ARVN 32nd Ranger Battalion was still fighting at least two VC companies just north of the city, and at least one VC battalion was dug into the eastern suburbs of Mỹ Tho. Two battalions from the ARVN 7th Infantry Division were marching back to the city but would not arrive for another day. It would be up to the Americans to spearhead the counterattack.

With several hours of daylight still remaining, David ordered his two battalion commanders to begin clearing the western suburbs. As the troops began to move north into the city, they met heavy fire. With the 3/60th Infantry, moving on the west, both battalions advanced north through the western portion of the city, receiving small arms. automatic fire, and rocket fire. Fighting was intense as the city had to be cleared slowly and systematically; pockets of resistance had to be wiped out to prevent the VC from closing in behind allied troops. While advancing through the city. Company A, 3/47th Infantry, met heavy fire at 16:15 and Company E was ordered to reinforce. On the way the lead elements or Company E also met intense fire and were eventually pinned down at the western edge of Mỹ Tho. At this time both maneuver battalions were involved in pitched battles and were taking casualties. The 3/60th Infantry, continued its movement north advancing under heavy VC fire and air strikes were requested at 17:40 to assist the battalion's forward elements. Troops moved in and out of doorways, from house to house and from street to street. Artillery was employed against VC troops who were fleeing the city. At 19:55 a group of VC who had been in a previous engagement with troops of the ARVN 7th Division attempted to enter the streets where Company B, 3/60th Infantry, was fighting, but by 21:00 Company B had killed 15 VC.

Company A, 3/47th Infantry requested a helicopter light fire team to support its point element which had met intense resistance from small arms and rocket fire and had suffered several casualties. At 18:25 the light fire team arrived and was used to relieve the pressure on Companies A and E by firing on VC positions. The team made runs directly over Company A and placed fire within 25m of the company's lead elements. By 21:00 most of the firing had ceased and the VC began to withdraw under cover of darkness. Throughout the night sporadic sniper fire and occasional grenade attacks were directed against the Allied forces but no major engagements developed.

On 2 February the 2nd Brigade continued to attack VC strongholds within the city which was now encircled by Allied units. At 06:30 both US battalions continued a sweep to the north in the western portion of the city, encountering only light resistance. At 09:15 a VC force was engaged on the northern edge of the city. Tactical air strikes with Napalm were called in and dislodged VC holding a guard tower near a highway bridge. The resulting damage to the bridge was repaired under fire by the MRF's supporting engineer platoon. Upon completion of the sweep, the city was cleared of VC units and the MRF battalions loaded onto Armored Troop Carriers (ATCs) at 12:01 for redeployment to Cai Lậy District in Dinh Tuong Province.

By this time, the VC offensive had lost much of its original intensity in Dinh Tuong Province and the VC appeared to be withdrawing to the north and west. Base Area 170, where the MRF had taken up positions before Tết, was thought to be a likely location for the VC to regroup. The MRF therefore moved the 25 km from Mỹ Tho to the Cai Lậy area to cut off VC escape routes from eastern Dinh Tuong Province. There were no significant engagements during the following two days as the VC apparently remained close to Mỹ Tho and did not immediately withdraw to their normal base areas.

Overall, the VC lost over 115 soldiers and perhaps as many as 400 in Mỹ Tho. By comparison, the MRF lost three soldiers and the ARVN 25, while 64 civilians were killed. Over 4,939 homes were destroyed, mainly from Allied artillery and air strikes, but also from VC mortar rounds and rockets, as well as by fires started by tracer rounds used by both sides. This destruction displaced 5,674 families and created over 39,000 refugees in a district of 129,922 people.

=== Vĩnh Long ===
At 03:00 on 31 January, an estimated force of 1,200 VC launched attacks against Vĩnh Long and several surrounding military installations. Defending the city was a squadron of the ARVN 2nd Armored Cavalry Regiment of the 9th Division, the 43rd Ranger Battalion, sailors from the PBR/RAG base and a small contingent of MACV advisors, U.S. Army military police, and U.S. Army combat engineers.

Although the ARVN forces had wiped out a VC sapper team that had tried to seize the city jail, they failed to prevent the 306th Local Force Battalion and several district companies from occupying the southern part of the city. A second enemy battalion, the 308th Local Force Battalion, had tried to cross the river from its north bank, but Republic of Vietnam Navy patrol boats had sunk or turned away most of the VC sampans.

A VC mortar and sapper attack hit the Vĩnh Long Airfield which was defended by pilots and maintenance personnel from HA(L)-3, Detachment 3. The airfield commander, Lieutenant colonel Bernard Davis Thompson Jr., was killed by VC fire while leading the defense. The defenders held out until the morning when the ARVN 3rd Squadron, 2nd Armored Cavalry Regiment arrived and cleared the outer perimeter of the airfield. The ARVN unit then departed later that day to engage the VC in the center of Vĩnh Long. At 18:02 on the 31st, Company C, 3/47th Infantry inserted by helicopter into Vinh Long Airfield to shore up base defenses for the evening.

On the 31st, the ARVN 3rd Squadron, 2nd Armored Cavalry attempted to clear Vĩnh Long's main street but was stalled by machine-gun fire and Rocket-propelled grenades (RPGs). By evening it was forced to pull back to more secure areas. The next morning the 3rd Squadron again tried to recapture the main street, but made no progress due to lack of infantry support. That evening the ARVN 3rd Battalion, 15th Infantry arrived on boats to reinforce the 3d Squadron, and the next morning, 2 February, the two units again attempted to dislodge the VC defenders from the city's main thoroughfare, battling the VC house-to-house and through piles of rubble.

Late on 2 February at the direction of Eckhardt, the 3/47th Infantry and the 3/60th Infantry moved to Vĩnh Long to relieve continued VC pressure on South Vietnamese units. The two battalions were transported by helicopter and boat to positions south of Vĩnh Long and together with other Allied forces they established a cordon around the city. The Mobile Riverine Base relocated during the day to an anchorage on the Mekong River north of Vĩnh Long. The 3/60th Infantry, completed the first airlift by 16:55 with no opposition, but at 17:33, on the east bank of the Rach Ca Tre Company A began to receive sniper fire. At the same time Company E was attacked with small arms and automatic weapons fire. Company E returned fire and commenced movement against the VC while artillery was used against their position. Company A meanwhile came under intense fire as it moved to its assigned sector. At 20:30 Company E met a heavily armed VC company, and the fight was still in progress at 21:15, As a result of this engagement, the 3/47th Infantry sent Company C to reinforce the 3/60th Infantry.

The battalions were blocking VC movement from Vĩnh Long at several points. Boats of the river assault divisions conducted patrols on the Rach Long Ho and Song Co Chiem throughout the night, reporting only a few incidents, division boats received small arms and automatic weapons fire from the west and east banks of the Rach Long Ho which was suppressed with no casualties. During the remaining hours of darkness on 4 February the 3/60th Infantry, continued to engage the VC in a fight that subsided gradually, Companies A and C were low on ammunition and required resupply. At 02:00 a resupply helicopter was taken under fire and downed while attempting to land, but an infantry force secured the craft and its crew. Throughout the night the VC probed both battalion positions, but suffered a considerable number of casualties. At dawn both battalions conducted search operations within their immediate areas and confirmed VC losses of 29 killed for the loss of one US killed.

Operations south of Vĩnh Long continued until 5 February with Allied forces attempting to clear the area by pushing south against blocks of infantrymen inserted by helicopter. Intelligence indicated there was a VC battalion in the area. Company E, 3/60th Infantry, conducted airmobile search operations and Company A cleared the area near the Vĩnh Long Airfield. The 3/47th Infantry, operated east of the Rach Cai Cam River encountering several small VC units during the afternoon. Upon completion of the sweep, the infantry was loaded aboard ATCs and by 17:25 had returned to the Mobile Riverine Base after eight days and nights of continuous movement and combat. Company A, 3/60th Infantry, provided security for Vĩnh Long Airfield and Company C provided security for the Mobile Riverine Base and for the 3rd Battalion, 34th Artillery Regiment.

On 6 February, in response to intelligence reports that the VC had succeeded in moving large forces southwest through the cordon around Vĩnh Long, Company B, 3/60th Infantry, departed the Mobile Riverine Base by boat in the early morning in an attempt to overtake the VC. The area to be searched was west of Vĩnh Long Airfield and south of National Highway 4. Company B made its first landing just south of the Highway 4 bridge over the Rach Cai Cam at 08:10. Popular Forces troops at a nearby outpost revealed that a large VC unit was in the woods and along the stream approximately 500m south of the bridge. Re-embarking, Company B commenced reconnaissance along the banks of the Rach Cai Cam to the south of the bridge. At 11:00 the lead element of Monitors and ASPBs received fire from automatic weapons, recoilless rifles and RPGs on both banks of the river. Company B, supported by artillery, gunships and fire from the river craft assaulted the west bank of the Rach Cai Cam just north of the area of the ambush and swept south. No VC was found and the company reembarked on the ATCs and continued along the stream, landing patrols at irregular intervals.

When the VC opened fire at 11:00, Company E, 3/60th Infantry was dispatched by boat from the Mobile Riverine Base and arrived in the area at 14:30. Company B was again landed on the west bank of the Rach Cai Cam near the 11:00 firefight area, and Company E was beached at that time just opposite Company B on the east bank of the Rach Cai Cam. Almost immediately both companies came under heavy RPG, grenade and 60mm mortar fire. Company B charged the VC positions in its zone, killed the VC and captured 4 weapons, suffering two soldiers wounded. For his actions during the fighting on 6 February Company B Private first class Thomas James Kinsman would be awarded the Medal of Honor. Company E had 12 wounded in the first clash and was held up while the wounded were evacuated. By 15:10 the VC had withdrawn to the southwest. Company A, 3/60th Infantry, landed just south of the Regional Forces and was able to move rapidly south through the rice paddies and act as a blocking force to the west of Company B. Men of Company A observed 20 VC in the river to their west, apparently trying to escape and called in artillery fire that caused several secondary explosions. Shortly thereafter, at 17:00 all three companies received heavy automatic weapons and RPG fire from the wooded streamline in front of them and became heavily engaged. The battalion commander, having committed all of his available infantry, requested that the Brigade reserve force be committed in an attempt to encircle the VC positions. By nightfall however, VC forces had broken contact and the 3/60th infantry returned to the Mobile Riverine Base early on 7 February.

During the fighting between 2 and 6 February 1968, the U.S. Army suffered 4 killed and the Navy, 1 killed. Cumulative VC losses were 138 killed. In addition, 121 VC suspects were detained, 43 weapons captured, and 45 bunkers destroyed. Civilian losses in the province as a whole included 230 killed. Fighting in Vĩnh Long Province also created over 30,000 civilian refugees.

== Aftermath ==
From 8 through 12 February the MRF deployed to the northwest of Mỹ Tho and to Gia Định Province near Saigon and the operation ended on 12 February. From 29 January to 7 February, the VC lost 269 troops compared to 12 killed in action sustained by the MRF.

== See also ==
- Operation Coronado IX
- Operation Coronado XI
