= Operation Coronado II =

Part of the Vietnam War (1967)

- Part of Operation Coronado, Vietnam War
Date	27–31 July 1967
Location	Around Mỹ Tho, Mekong Delta, South Vietnam

Belligerents
United States; South Vietnam	Viet Cong

Commanders and leaders
MG George G. O'Connor	Unknown

Units involved
(United States) Mobile Riverine Force; 3rd Battalion, 39th Infantry Regiment; 3rd and 4th Battalions, 47th Infantry Regiment; 5th Battalion, 60th Infantry Regiment; 3rd Squadron, 5th Cavalry Regiment (South Vietnam) 3rd Marine Battalion; 44th Ranger Battalion	263rd Battalion; 514th Battalion

Casualties and losses
(United States) 9 killed	US body count: 73 killed 68 captured

Operation Coronado II was the second of eleven in the Operation Coronado series conducted by the U.S. Mobile Riverine Force (MRF) in conjunction with various units of the Army of the Republic of Vietnam (ARVN) in late July 1967 in an attempt to shut down Viet Cong (VC) strongholds in the Mekong Delta. Three battalions of American troops, along with two ARVN battalions, backed by helicopters and watercraft swept the area and waterways surrounding Mỹ Tho in search of VC forces. Two VC battalions were encountered and many captured, although both sides suffered numerous casualties. The Allied forces also cordoned off the area to search water traffic for VC supplies or suspects. The Americans credited the South Vietnamese 3rd Marine Battalion for the success of the operation.

== Background ==
The Mobile Riverine Force ended Operation Coronado I in Long An Province because of intelligence indicating communist buildup west of Mỹ Tho in Định Tường Province. The force received word on 25 July that the MRF Base would move on 27 July from the confluence of the Soài Rạp and Vàm Cỏ Rivers to the vicinity of Đồng Tâm. During the afternoon of 25 July ground forces were picked up by assault craft and returned to the MRF Base. At 02:00 on 27 July riverine assault craft began leaving the base for minesweeping and patrol stations along the route to Đồng Tâm. At 05:50 the last ship was proceeding south on the Soài Rạp River. Because of the slow speed of the towed APL moving against the tide the journey took almost 12 hours, but did not delay the commencement of the new operation in Định Tường Province on 28 July. In just over 48 hours the MRF was able to relocate a base supporting 3,900 men a distance of 96 km and to shift its area of operations a total of 136 km to the area west of Đồng Tâm.

The MRF was about to join the largest force with which it would co-operate in a single operation in its Vietnam experience. Intelligence indicated that a VC force of several battalions threatened Mỹ Tho and Đồng Tâm; the plan was to attack simultaneously three of the four VC base areas in Định Tường Province from which an attack might be staged.

== Operation ==
On 27 July the ARVN 7th Division initiated operations designed to sweep for VC from east to west, north of Highway 4. The search would cover the territory around the Ap Bac base area and in the eastern portion of the VC Base Area 470. On 28 July the MRF would move into the Cam Son base area; on 29 July one or more battalions of Vietnamese Marines would move into the Ban Long base area. The U.S. 9th Infantry Division was to place the 5th Battalion, 60th Infantry (Mechanized), under the operational control of the 2nd Brigade for the Cam Son operation, and was to hold the 3rd Battalion, 39th Infantry Regiment, on call at that battalion's Long An base camp. The 1st Brigade, 25th Infantry Division, was to arrive at Đồng Tâm on 28 July for commitment under the operational control of the 9th Division. The ARVN 7th Division was given the 44th Ranger Battalion by the commander of South Vietnam's IV Corps for insertion by helicopter into the northwestern portion of Cam Son on 28 July. The US Navy Task Force 116 (Game Warden) was to patrol the Mỹ Tho River from Mỹ Tho to Sa Đéc with 30 Patrol Boat, Rivers. To facilitate command and control, the 9th Division moved a forward command post to Đồng Tâm for the operation.

== 28 July ==
The MRF operation in Cam Son began during the evening of 28 July with the movement of the 5/60th Infantry, from its Long An base camp along Highway 4 to the town of Cai Lậy. A battalion command post was established there as the maneuver companies continued south into the Cam Son area. As the mechanized battalion moved into the area of operations from the northeast, the 3rd and 4th Battalions of the 47th Infantry Regiment moved by assault craft into the waterways in the southern portion of Cam Son.

Troop D, 3rd Squadron, 5th Cavalry Regiment, apart from its aerial rifle platoon, was operating with the MRF for the first time. The troop had a reconnaissance mission covering eastern Cam Son and western Ban Long on the brigade's flank. One rifle company of the 3/60th Infantry, was on call to the 2nd Brigade for airmobile employment from Đồng Tâm.

Two assault helicopter companies were available to the 2nd US Brigade from II Field Force. At 08:00 on 28 July they conducted feint landings at two landing zones just north of known VC fortifications in northern Cam Son to delay VC movement north until both the 5/60th Infantry and the 44th Ranger Battalion could move into blocking positions near the feint landing zones.

On 28 July troops of the ARVN 7th Division north of Highway 4 received a sporadic VC fire and the MRF encountered a few VC in Cam Son. Troop D detected a squad of VC in the Ban Long area and killed five of them with gunship fire. Throughout the late morning on 29 July both the 3rd and 4th Battalions, 47th Infantry Regiment, discovered widely dispersed small groups of VC. From their movements it was deduced that these groups were trying to retreat north into a fortified area. As the 3/47th Infantry moved companies into this area from the north and south on the east bank of the Rach Ba Rai, the VC resisted. Between the hours of 17:00 and 19:00, Company C of the 3/47th Infantry pressed north; small enemy groups moving northeast delayed the company's advance. During these two hours an Armored Troop Carrier (ATC) was hit by B-40 rockets and 57-mm. recoilless rifle fire; 25 American troops were wounded by fragments. The 5/60th Infantry fired upon individuals and small groups of VC during the late afternoon and evening. None of the MRF units were able to determine the VC position and by 19:30 contact was lost. Most of the VC dead were found when the Allied infantry moved into areas that had been attacked by artillery and helicopter gunships.

== 29 July ==
By the night of 29 July, the fact that the ARVN 7th Division north of Highway 4 had found few VC and that the VC in central Cam Son had evaded major battle prompted 9th Division commander General O'Connor and Marine commander Colonel Lan, to consider the probability that the VC were in the Ban Long area. Although the MRF intelligence gathered in central Cam Son was far from conclusive, the highly evasive VC tactics when encountered by the Allied forces was considered to be an indication that those VC encountered might be protecting the movement of larger units into Ban Long. This was in keeping with the pattern of movement in southern Định Tường Province, and while no VC were detected in Ban Long by D Troop on 29 July, a VC squad had been attacked there by gunships on 28 July.

At approximately 20:00 on 29 July Colonel Lan selected a landing zone for his 3rd Marine Battalion to begin landing by helicopter in Ban Long the next day. The area selected by Colonel Lan as a likely enemy position was near where D Troop had discovered the VC on 28 July.

== 30 July ==
When it landed on 30 July, the 3rd Marine Battalion met heavy resistance. They immediately attacked the VC, who were in a wooded area north of the landing zone. More Marines were airlifted into the landing zone under continuous VC fire. For five hours the Marines attacked prepared VC defensive positions, who fired light and heavy machine guns and mortars. In contrast, the Marines relied on helicopter gunships and artillery. The 3rd Marine Battalion fought the enemy throughout the afternoon, capturing some VC equipment.

Noting the long east–west belt of trees that could provide concealment for the VC, General O'Connor employed the 1st Brigade, 25th Division, east of the Marines' location to block any VC movement towards the east. In mid-afternoon General O'Connor directed Colonel William B. Fulton, commanding officer of the 2nd Brigade, to assist the 3rd Marine Battalion in evacuating casualties and preparing for an attack against the VC. Colonel Fulton directed Lieutenant Colonel Bruce E. Wallace, commander of the 3/47th Infantry, to establish a blocking position west of the battle area, facing east, which was accomplished by 20:00. The 4/47th Infantry, deployed in the field for three days, returned to the MRF Base with instructions to be prepared to deploy early on 31 July. The 5/60th Infantry, was detached to 9th Division at 12:30.

During the action on 29 July, several ATCs were hit with small arms, rocket, and recoilless rifle fire, none suffered major structural damage. Hits and minor damage were received by five craft, but the boats were able to remain in operation. At approximately 20:30 on 30 July, Colonel Lan requested illumination for a night attack against VC positions. The subsequent attack by the 3rd Marine Battalion silenced several VC 12.7-mm. machine guns. The attack was stopped by Colonel Lan because his own losses were also heavy. Illumination was maintained during the night; at approximately 04:30, 31 July, the VC counterattacked to the east, with heavy losses to both sides.

== 31 July ==
Later in the morning of 31 July, the 5/60th Infantry was again placed under the leadership of Colonel Fulton. At 08:35, the battalion went to the assistance of the ARVN 1st Cavalry Squadron and the 44th Ranger Battalion, which had met the VC while moving to assist the 3rd Marine Battalion. By 08:25 the 5/60th Infantry occupied a blocking position northeast of the 3/47th Infantry, where it remained for the day. During the morning of 31 July, the 3/39th Infantry was placed under the operational control of Colonel Fulton, bringing the MRF to four battalions and Troop D, 3/5th Cavalry. The 3/39th Infantry landed south of Vinh Kim and searched west.

Reports from the 44th Ranger Battalion and 3rd Marine Battalion indicated that the VC forces, identified as the 263rd Main Force Battalion, had dispersed during the pre-dawn counterattack and were moving south. Airborne reconnaissance by the 3/39th Infantry, revealed movement south towards the village of Ap Binh Thoi.

Colonel Fulton directed the 3/39th Infantry, to conduct reconnaissance using helicopters southeast of the battle area and moving west to Ap Binh Thoi. He directed Colonel Wallace to move his battalion southeast and to search the area as he moved on Ap Binh Thoi. This search was initiated in mid-morning and by 17:00 both American battalions were on the outskirts of Ap Binh Thoi. During that time VC were observed moving into the village in groups of 25–30.

The 4/47th Infantry and elements of an ARVN military police company landed by ATC and entered Ap Binh Thoi. One American company moved out to search northwest of the town while the rest of the battalion assisted the Vietnamese police in apprehending and interrogating people suspected of being VC. Several of the prisoners reported they were from the 263rd Main Force Battalion and elements of the 514th Local Force Battalion. Company C, 4/47th Infantry, captured four men northwest of Ap Binh Thoi, all of them members of the 263rd Main Force Battalion including the battalion's deputy commander. Of the more than 400 suspects detained by the Vietnamese police, 83 were from the 263rd Main Force Battalion. The cordon around Ap Binh Thoi was completed by nightfall on 31 July, and no more VC were sighted.

== Aftermath ==
The four-day operation caused heavy losses to the 263rd Battalion. The Americans said that this was "primarily because of the outstanding performance of the 3rd Marine Battalion...[who] destroyed major fortifications in the Cam Son base area, probably thwarted planned enemy operations against Đồng Tâm, and eased the pressure on Highway 4."

After this was done intelligence sources reported that the VC had attempted to organize boats for a crossing of the Mỹ Tho River into Kien Hoa Province but were blocked by the cordon at Ap Binh Thoi and the river patrols. During the five-day operation on the Mỹ Tho River, more than 50 patrol craft were employed; 283 Vietnamese watercraft were stopped and searched by US naval craft and the MRF in the most ambitious attempt to control river traffic during 1967.

== See also ==
- Operation Coronado
- Operation Coronado IV
- Operation Coronado V
- Operation Coronado IX
- Operation Coronado XI
