= Operation Coronado V =

Part of the Vietnam War (1967)

- Part of Operation Coronado, Vietnam War
Date	12 September – 7 October 1967
Location	Định Tường and Kiến Hòa Provinces, South Vietnam
Result	Allied victory

Belligerents
United States; South Vietnam	Viet Cong

Commanders and leaders
BG William B. Fulton	

Units involved
(United States) 3rd Battalion, 47th Infantry Regiment (United States) 60th Infantry Regiment (South Vietnam) Định Tường Province Regional Forces	263rd Battalion

Casualties and losses
23 killed	US body count: 376 killed

Operation Coronado V was a riverine military operation conducted by the U.S. Mobile Riverine Force (MRF) and elements of the Army of the Republic of Vietnam from 12 September to 5 October 1967 in an attempt to shut down Viet Cong (VC) strongholds in the Mekong Delta. The first part of the operation took place in Định Tường Province (now Tiền Giang Province). After receiving intelligence that the VC 263rd Main Force battalion had been seen in the region, three Allied battalions were brought in on 12 September by helicopters and boats. Immediately there was heavy contact, and although the Allies reported killing 134, the majority of the VC escaped. Sweeps of the area resulted in another major confrontation with the VC on 15 September. During the four-day period, U.S. and ARVN reported 213 VC killed. The Allied forces then moved into adjoining Kiến Hòa Province (now Bến Tre Province). From 5–7 October another encounter with the VC 263rd Battalion resulted and the Allies reported 163 VC killed while losing seven.

== Background ==
Brigadier General Nguyen Manh Thanh, commander of the ARVN 7th Division, was given information that the VC 263rd Main Force Battalion had been in the vicinity of Cam Son and Ban Long in the past 10–14 days. Although this was based mainly on possible double agents, the MRF had found it highly reliable in identifying enemy base areas. In Định Tường Province particularly the force repeatedly had found the VC in regions reported to be base areas.

== Operation ==
On 12 September, the MRF entered the Ban Long area with three battalions. The 3rd and 5th Battalions of the 60th Infantry Regiment, under the control of the 2nd Brigade, used helicopter and overland movement to access the major east–west forested portion of the Ban Long area. This was due to the fact that the assault craft of the force were unable to navigate the local waterways.

As the 3/60th Infantry, moved into the forest it found a VC force in well-prepared positions. Assisted by artillery and close air support, the Americans advanced to the east. Under the pressure of the American infantry advance and supporting fire, the VC attempted to evade to the north and northwest, exposing themselves along thinly vegetated rice paddy dikes. The 5/60th Infantry, northwest of the 3rd Battalion, engaged a platoon of the enemy; fire from M113 armored personnel carriers and mortars killed or dispersed the VC.

At approximately 14:30 a battalion of Định Tường Province Regional Forces was sent in by helicopter northeast of the 3/60th Infantry. The South Vietnamese battalion engaged the VC, who were on the run after the attacks by the 3rd and 5th Battalions, 60th Infantry. The MRF lost 9 killed and 23 wounded, all from the 3/60th Infantry. The three battalions killed 134 VC and captured 39. Although the bulk of the VC escaped on 12 September, the MRF continued to search the Ban Long area until they returned to base on 14 September.

After consulting with General William B. Fulton, Colonel David concluded that if an operation was launched around Cam Son on 15 September, the Americans might be able to find the 514th Local Force Battalion. The plan was to attack the area in central Cam Son; previous operations had yielded evidence that it was the location of the VC's heaviest fortifications. In order to not alert the VC and give them time to escape, David decided to withhold preparatory and reconnaissance fire until the American assault craft passed a wide curve in the Rach Ba Rai referred to as "Snoopy's Nose" (10.323°N 106.089°E). Helicopter flights over the area were to be limited until the assault craft passed Snoopy's Nose. The movement of the 5/60th Infantry by ground vehicles into the Cam Son area from Cai Lậy was to be delayed until the 3/60th Infantry, and 3rd Battalion, 47th Infantry Regiment, entered the Rach Ba Rai aboard Armored Troop Carriers (ATCs). Finally, to provide a higher degree of flexibility in case the VC was found, the 2/60th Infantry, 3rd Brigade, was designated a reserve force by the 9th Division. If required, this battalion would be deployed by helicopter, staging from Đồng Tâm after moving from the battalion's base in Long An Province.

Key elements of the maneuver were the landing of the 3/60th Infantry north of an eastward bend in the Rach Ba Rai and the movement of the 5/60th Infantry from the northeast. Both battalions would attack into a series of tree lines which the American planners believed had been used by the communists in the past to escape fighting.

As the 3/60th Infantry, moved up the Rach Ba Rai at approximately 07:15 on 15 September, fire was withheld, and the assault craft moved steadily around Snoopy's Nose. By 07:30 the lead boats were nearing Beach White Two where a company of Lt. Col. Mercer M. Doty's 3/60th Infantry, was to land when the flotilla came under heavy rocket, automatic, and small arms fire from both sides of the stream (10.376°N 106.088°E). Most VC fire came from the east, and the organic firepower of the American assault craft came primarily to the right flank of the force. In the smoke and confusion the assault craft maneuvered to fire weapons or to avoid other American craft temporarily out of control. One ATC proceeded north of the lead minesweepers and landed on Beach White Two with the company commander and one platoon of Company B, 3/60th Infantry.

During the 15–20 minutes following the beginning of hostilities, the flow of information through the American command and control communications net did little to reflect the situation. Colonel Doty, flying over the boats and observing the apparent mobility of all assault craft and the success of one ATC in arriving at Beach White Two, was convinced that his unit could proceed and land at the assigned beaches. Lieutenant Commander Francis E. Rhodes Jr., commanding the assault craft supporting Colonel Doty, issued an order at 07:58 for all boats to turn back and assemble in the vicinity of Beaches Red One and Two. Commander Rhodes' decision was based on casualties to boat crews and damage to minesweepers. The standing orders of Task Force 117 required that minesweepers precede troop-carrying ATCs, but he could not continue minesweeping to Beach White One. To act contrary to this procedure would constitute an action outside the "limits permitted by accepted tactical practices" of the Navy task force.

The boat captain who passed the minesweepers and landed his ATC at White Beach One was thought to have pressed on by the fact that the infantry company commander was on board. The successful movement of this one assault craft was not known to Rhodes at the time of his decision. Doty was firm in his belief that the convoy could and should continue. While the 3/60th Infantry, and River Assault Squadron 11 evacuated casualties, resupplied, and reorganized at the Red Beaches, the 5/60th Infantry, moved overland toward Beach White One from the northeast. The 3/47th Infantry, was held south of the congested area of Beach Red, and prepared to resume movement on order.

At approximately 10:00 3/60th Infantry began to move upstream, supported by artillery gunships and helicopters. The fire was as great as before but the convoy landed at Beaches White One and Two. Companies B and C had few wounded in this second run, but Company A had 18 men wounded in only one platoon. Both the assault craft and the infantry, who had responded to the VC fire, required resupply. Once ashore, the 3/60th Infantry, attacked south against heavy VC resistance. The 3/47th Infantry landed at Beaches Red One and Two and pushed north. The 5/60th Infantry moved close enough to see the 3/60th Infantry by early afternoon.

To encircle the VC south of 3/60th Infantry, the 2/60th Infantry was placed under the control of the 2d Brigade and landed by helicopter south of the 5/60th Infantry. By nightfall the 3/60th Infantry, unable to overcome the VC, was ordered back to improve its defensive position. One ARVN battalion was landed by helicopter at approximately 16:00, northwest of the 3/60th Infantry, and prepared to set up a position along the west bank of the Rach Ba Rai. The four American battalions were in an arc on the east side of the Rach Ba Rai. The stream was deemed a possible VC escape route to the west, although the 3/47th Infantry had seized a number of civilian boats just north of Route 212 during the late afternoon. Assault craft supporting the 3/47th Infantry, and 3/60th Infantry, were positioned to watch for VC and place fire along the stream; however, no U.S. boats were deployed into the stream unless U.S. were ashore.

During darkness, air and artillery illumination was maintained over the area and artillery fire was placed within the partially encircled area on suspected VC locations. Between 02:00 and 04:30, small groups of VC were observed and fired upon ahead of the 2/60th Infantry, and later the 3/47th Infantry. After 04:30 on 16 September no more VC were sighted. On 16 September the 5/60th Infantry, led a sweep into the area, followed by sweeps by the two southern battalions forward of their positions. Resistance was light as most of the VC encountered on 15 September had been killed or had slipped away during the night.

The operation ended on 16 September after four days of heavy fighting in which the U.S. lost 16 killed and 146 wounded and the VC suffered 213 dead.

== Aftermath ==
Following the Cam Son operation, the MRF moved into Kiến Hòa Province. Although operations during the remainder of September were widely dispersed in Ham Long, Giồng Trôm, and Huong My districts, interrogation of local civilians revealed that they had prior knowledge of the operations. In Giong Trom, locals said that a VC unit, believed to be part of the 516th Local Force Battalion, had been in the area, but had left the night before the MRF arrived. This experience was typical of MRF operations conducted in Kiến Hòa Province in late 1967. Operations usually involved VC RPG-2 and recoilless rifle teams who delayed the Americans but inflicted few losses. Helicopters became invaluable during movement to detect and attack small VC formations armed with anti-tank weapons. These operations in Kiến Hòa Province saw the first use of the long-awaited Assault Support Patrol Boats.

During the period 5–7 October, the MRF ended Coronado V with an operation around Ban Long alongside the ARVN 7th Division that resulted in a battle with the VC 263rd Battalion. The MRF lost 1 killed and 26 wounded, while the 7th Division suffered 6 dead and 36 wounded, while the VC lost 163 dead.

== See also ==
- Operation Coronado
- Operation Coronado II
- Operation Coronado IV
- Operation Coronado IX
- Operation Coronado XI
