= Operation Coronado XI =

Part of the Vietnam War (1968)

- Part of Operation Coronado, Vietnam War
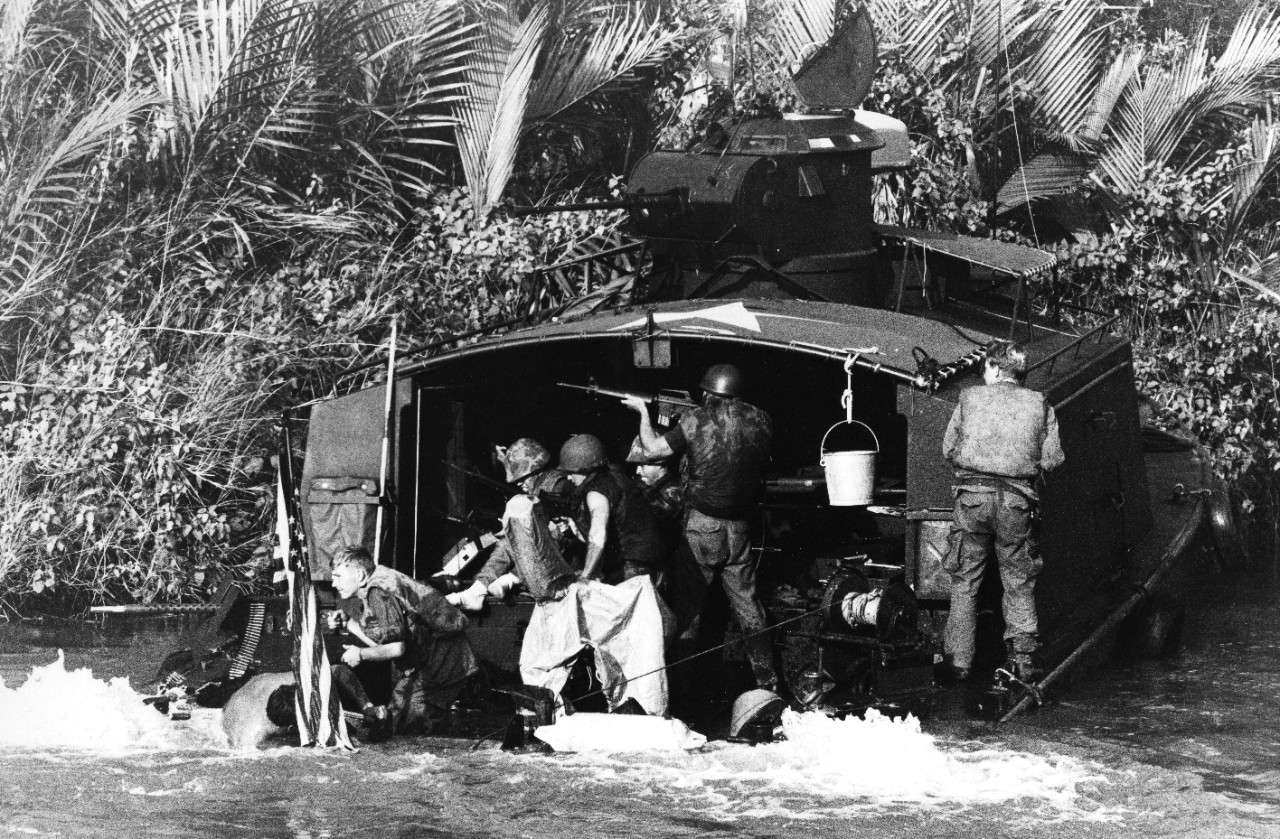
- An Assault Support Patrol Boat (ASPB) is damaged by Viet Cong fire
Date	12 February – 3 March 1968
Location	Cai Rang and Phung Hiep Districts near Can Tho, Phong Dinh Province, South Vietnam
Result	Allied operational success

Belligerents
United States; South Vietnam	Viet Cong

Commanders and leaders
BG William B. Fulton	Unknown

Units involved
3rd Battalion, 47th Infantry Regiment; 3rd Battalion, 60th Infantry Regiment	303rd Battalion; 307th Battalion; 309th Battalion; Tay Do Battalion

Casualties and losses
Unknown	297 killed

Operation Coronado XI was the eleventh of the Operation Coronado series of riverine military operations conducted by the U.S. Mobile Riverine Force (MRF) and units of the Army of the Republic of Vietnam (ARVN), designed to secure Cần Thơ in the aftermath of the Tet Offensive. It ran from 12 February to 3 March 1968.

== Background ==
The ARVN IV Corps commander, General Nguyễn Văn Mạnh requested U.S. assistance in ejecting the Viet Cong (VC) 303rd, 307th, 309th and Tay Do Battalions from the outskirts of Cần Thơ. The operational plan, as developed by the MRF in co-ordination with the senior US adviser for IV Corps, was to conduct riverine, air, and ground search operations in Cai Rang and Phung Hiep Districts of Phong Dinh Province, to locate and destroy Military Region III headquarters, and to conduct waterborne cordon and infantry search operations on the island of Cu Lao May in the Bassac River.

== Operation ==
=== Initial phase ===
Operation Coronado XI commenced on 12 February 1968, with the movement of the MRF from Đồng Tâm Base Camp to an anchorage in the vicinity of Cần Thơ. The force proceeded up the Mekong River through the waterway that connects the Mỹ Tho and Bassac Rivers, and down the Bassac to Cần Thơ. The force arrived shortly after 13:00 on 13 February, having completed a journey of 176 km from Đồng Tâm.

On 14 February the 3rd Battalion, 47th Infantry Regiment and the 3rd Battalion, 60th Infantry Regiment landed from boats and conducted sweeps north along the canals immediately south of Cần Thơ. Units of the ARVN 9th and 21st Divisions operated north of the city, sweeping to the southwest. Company A, 3/47th Infantry, found a VC cache which contained 460 B-40 rounds, 90 kg explosives, 89 120-mm. mortar rounds, and 225 kg of medical supplies.

During 15–19 February, the MRF conducted river and air operations west of Cần Thơ without encountering significant VC forces. When the Cần Thơ Army Airfield suffered a heavy VC rocket and mortar attack on 16 February, the main task of the MRF was to sweep the area around the airfield.

On 19 February, at the request of the senior U.S. adviser to IV Corps, General Eckhardt, MRF units initiated joint waterborne patrols with units of the Republic of Vietnam Navy River Assault Group along a 21 km stretch of the Cần Thơ River to halt all sampan traffic. At 22:17 an American Monitor was struck by B-40 rocket rounds that penetrated the 40-mm. turret. Although seven people, including a RVNN interpreter, were wounded, the Monitor was able to suppress the communist automatic weapons and small arms fire. The patrols continued throughout the night in an effort to prevent the escape of Vietcong units.

On 22 February the MRF and RVNN armed forces initiated a riverine and air operation in Phụng Hiệp District to locate the VC's Military Region III headquarters. The 3/47th Infantry, moved into position by the Saintenoy Canal. Fire support was provided by Battery C, 2nd Battalion, 35th Artillery Regiment and 3rd Battalion, 35th Artillery Regiment. For the boats to pass the low Phung Hiep Bridge, the ARVN engineers raised the center span of the bridge with jacks. As the assault boats proceeded west from Phụng Hiệp, sporadic VC sniper fire from the north bank of the canal wounded four US Navy personnel. The riverine movement beyond the bridge apparently caught the VC off-guard. When Companies B and C, 3/47th Infantry, beached along the Lai Hieu Canal, just northeast of Hiep Hung, the VC were in bunkers facing the opposite direction towards the rice paddies in anticipation of airmobile attacks. The VC ran into the open fields away from the canal where they suffered 66 killed at the hands of artillery and gunships. No US casualties occurred during this action.

On 23 February, the MRF withdrew from the area. Throughout the day there was no sight of the VC or their infrastructure, as the Americans penetrated the deepest into the Mekong Delta they had been.

== Second phase ==
On 24 February the MRF conducted a waterborne cordon and search operation on the island of Cu Lao May during which both infantry battalions conducted medical and dental civil action programs at enclosures where Vietnamese were detained for questioning in an attempt to win over the population. There was no military contact with the VC in this one-day operation.

On 25 February the 2nd Brigade and the MRF returned to Cần Thơ after a VC mortar attack hit the airfield there killing 2 U.S., damaging 2 aircraft and destroying an ammunition dump. The 2nd Brigade swept the mortar site and on the morning of 26 February, located an entrenched VC battalion 7 km northwest of Cần Thơ. Company B, 3/60th Infantry, landed under fire, suffering many wounded men and 12 damaged helicopters. Other elements of the MRF moved to support Company B; Company E was airlifted at 11:30 and landed approximately 800 m east of Company B and Company A followed at 14:05. At 15:45, more than five hours after the initial skirmish, Companies B and E were still heavily engaged and did not link up until 17:05, and because of the number of casualties sustained by Company B, it was placed under the control of Company E. Companies A, B, and E established a night defensive position and were resupplied by 22:00. The 3/47th Infantry, to the northwest encountered little fire throughout the day, and its scheme of maneuver was modified to allow it to provide additional support to the 3/60th Infantry.

Task Force 117 meanwhile had established patrols on the Cần Thơ River along the southern boundary of the operations area to prevent the communists from escaping. About 20:30 an Armored Troop Carrier (ATC) was hit in the port bow causing an explosion. An Assault Support Patrol Boat (ASPB) went to the aid of the ATC and was hit by VC automatic weapons fire. They returned fire was suppressed the VC position. Ten minutes later a second ATC was fired upon and missed by a recoilless rifle. The ATC immediately returned and suppressed the fire. There were no American casualties in either attack. The American units continued their patrols without incident until 02:15 when a major action occurred as a large VC force attempted to escape. An ASPB came under heavy fire from both banks and sustained several 13–40 rocket hits, causing heavy flooding and wounding two crewmen. Other river assault craft moved into the area and suppressed the VC fire, but one ASPB sank as it was being towed by a Monitor. All crew members were rescued, but the Monitor received several hits while moving to assist the disabled ASPB. During the same period, another ASPB, operating 4 km east of the first attack, was hit by heavy VC rocket and automatic weapons fire. The boat captain and radio men were killed and the three other crewmen were wounded but were able to beach the boat. The VC attack lasted 90 minutes, with four US assault craft involved in the battle. A light helicopter fire team was called in to help to cut down the enemy fire.

The VC were unable to escape south across the Cần Thơ River and continued to suffer casualties as the American blockade was maintained successfully throughout the battle. During the night the VC continued harassing the MRF battalions with probing attacks and sniper fire. On 27 February the area was swept again, confirming additional VC losses and discovering caches, including 5 crew-served weapons, 16 small arms, and assorted ammunition.

On 1 March, also, other elements of the MRF and three Vietnamese Ranger battalions operated around 5 km southwest of Cần Thơ. Heavy fighting developed in the afternoon and continued into the night. The VC slipped away before dawn and only scattered groups were found by the Americans the next day.

Within the Cần Thơ area, most movements by water were accomplished without significant opposition because the VC had not prepared fighting positions near the canals. However, had taken thorough defensive measures against airmobile operations conducted near open rice paddies. Bunkers were well constructed, with good overhead protection against artillery and air strikes.

The VC characteristically used an initial heavy volume of automatic weapons fire, followed by sporadic sniper fire. Sniper fire was directed especially at unit leaders and radio operators. The VC continued to fight until the late hours of the night, from 22:00 to 24:00, they then withdrew but continued to harass American positions with mortar and rocket fire. All American operations conducted in the Cần Thơ area used maximum naval and air assets.

Coronado XI ended on 3 March when the MRF left the Cần Thơ area for Đồng Tâm. From 4 to 6 March the force assumed the division reserve role while the 3/47th Infantry was replaced by the 4/47th Infantry in the rotation of battalions.

== Aftermath ==
VC losses were claimed by the US as 297 dead. The operation was regarded as a success because it had secured Cần Thơ and successfully penetrated areas of the Delta not previously attacked, threatening VC control of their previously secure base areas.

== See also ==
- Operation Coronado
- Operation Coronado II
- Operation Coronado IV
- Operation Coronado V
- Operation Coronado IX
