= Operation Coronado IV =

Part of the Vietnam War (1967)

- Part of Operation Coronado, Vietnam War
Date	19 August – 9 September 1967
Location	Mekong Delta, South Vietnam

Belligerents
United States	Viet Cong

Commanders and leaders
MG George G. O'Connor	Unknown

Units involved
(United States) Mobile Riverine Force; 3rd and 4th Battalions, 47th Infantry Regiment	506th Local Force Battalion

Casualties and losses
Unknown	59 killed 97 individual and 8 crew-served weapons recovered

Operation Coronado IV was the fourth of the Operation Coronado series of riverine military operations conducted by the U.S. Mobile Riverine Force (MRF), designed to shut down Viet Cong (VC) strongholds in the Mekong Delta. It ran from 19 August to 9 September 1967. It took place in Long An, Gò Công and Kiến Hòa Provinces (now Long An, Tien Giang and Bến Tre Provinces).

== Operation ==
On 20 August the MRF assault craft left the Soài Rạp and Vàm Cỏ river anchorage of the MRF's main base just after midnight and landed their troops at 09:04 in the target area north of Bến Lức on the Vàm Cỏ Dong (Vam Co East) River, after travelling more than 50 km. Because the waterways off the Vàm Cỏ Dong in the target area were not navigable by the vessels, the two infantry battalions were landed to move west and search the area on foot. Company C, 3rd Battalion, 47th Infantry Regiment remained at a pickup zone near the fire support base at Bến Lức as an airmobile reserve. To intercept VC forces, the 334th Aviation Company's supporting gunships maintained surveillance of the areas forward of the infantry battalions.

At 14:00 the movement of the 3/47th Infantry forced a VC platoon to retreat from a lightly fortified area. The gunships were then ordered by the battalion commander to open fire on VC attempting to evade contact with the ground troops, and the 3/47th Infantry, was brought in by helicopter to attack the VC, encountering mostly sniper fire and collateral damage from US helicopter fire. The Americans found 34 VC dead and documents that identified them as part of the 506th Local Force Battalion.

The Americans believed they had succeeded because of the surprise achieved by the ground troops in disembarking from the boats landing from the river, forcing the VC into open terrain where helicopters could attack them. During the phase of the operation at Ben Luc, which ended on 22 August, the MRF suffered six wounded and the VC 59 dead.

For the remainder of August and the first week of September, the MRF operated in Cần Giuộc District, encountering minor communist resistance. On 7 and 8 September the force operated in conjunction with the 1st Brigade, 9th Infantry Division, in the southeastern part of Nhơn Trạch District of Biên Hòa Province and the northeastern part of the Rung Sat Special Zone. They did not encounter many VC but a cache containing medical supplies, eight crew-served weapons, and 97 small arms was discovered. As the second week of September began, the force prepared to return to Định Tường Province in IV Corps further south.

== See also ==
- Operation Coronado
- Operation Coronado II
- Operation Coronado V
- Operation Coronado IX
- Operation Coronado XI
