= Operation Coronado IX =

Part of the Vietnam War (1967–1968)

- Part of Operation Coronado, Vietnam War
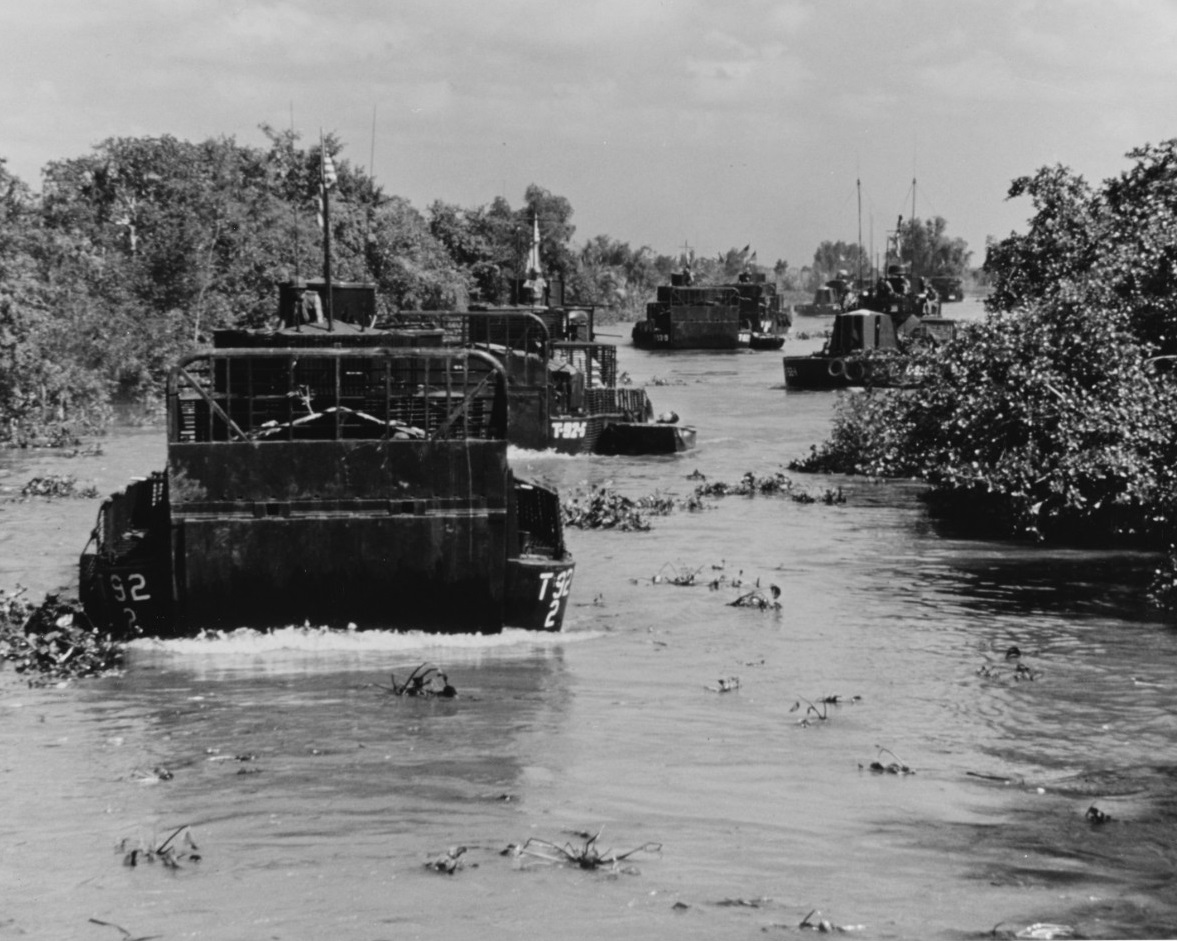
- ATCs move down a canal escorted by Monitors, November 1967
Date	1 November 1967– 22 January 1968
Location	Mekong Delta, South Vietnam
Result	Allied operational success

Belligerents
South Vietnam; United States	Viet Cong

Commanders and leaders
BG William B. Fulton; Col. Burt A. David	Unknown

Units involved
(United States) 3 battalions (South Vietnam) 2 battalions	263rd Battalion; 502nd Battalion

Casualties and losses
76 killed	434 killed

Operation Coronado IX was a riverine military operation conducted by the Mobile Riverine Force (MRF) of the United States and elements of the Army of the Republic of Vietnam (ARVN) from November 1967 to January 1968 in an attempt to destroy Viet Cong (VC) strongholds in the Mekong Delta. In the middle of November, clashes resulted in the capture of VC supplies and hideouts. During this period, the VC lost 178 men but killed only 26. For the next few weeks there was little contact, although some abandoned VC bunkers were destroyed and supplies captured. On 4 December, a large engagement occurred when a VC battalion encountered the South Vietnamese 5th Marine Battalion. 266 VC were killed, mostly by the Marines. The Marines lost 40 killed, while the Americans suffered 9 dead. Over the next month and the Christmas period, there was only sporadic skirmishes, but at the start of the new year, there were some medium size battles in which the Americans killed a few dozen VC. After this there was little contact.

== First phase ==
The operation began with the movement of the MRF from its late October anchorage off Vung Tau to an anchorage in the My Tho River near Đồng Tâm Base Camp. The series of actions in the operation was primarily conducted north of the Mỹ Tho River and directed against VC bases in Dinh Tuong Province.

The MRF arrived off Đồng Tâm on 1 November 1967 and during early November concentrated on equipment maintenance and preparations for coming operations. The 3rd Battalion, 60th Infantry Regiment disembarked and assumed the defense mission for Đồng Tâm Base. The battalion's waterborne replacement was the 3rd Battalion, 47th Infantry Regiment, which began tactical operations in the southeastern part of Giao Duc District in western Dinh Tuong Province at 15:00 on 2 November. During the nine-hour operation, the battalion destroyed 141 VC bunkers and evacuated 500 kg (1,100 lb) of rice and an assortment of engineering and medical materials from a cache. The evacuated materials were delivered to Dinh Tuong Province Headquarters for distribution within South Vietnamese government programs.

On 5 and 6 November, the two American battalions operated in Cam Son Secret Zone. Barge-mounted artillery supported infantry from a position on the north shore of the Mỹ Tho River. During this operation the MRF destroyed 34 bunkers, captured 360 kg (790 lb) of rice and 55 kg (121 lb) of salt, and killed five communists.

The Americans were joined by the 5th Battalion of the Republic of Vietnam Marine Corps at a shore camp near Mỹ Tho on 6 November. The Marine battalion had four rifle companies and a heavy weapons company, a strength equal to that of the two embarked American battalions. The Americans said that the South Vietnamese marines "brought a special esprit to the Mobile Riverine Force and fought extremely well throughout" the operation, under the leadership of a Major Nam, who joined the Americans in the planning of the operation. The US Navy assault craft, army artillery and Air Force planes supported three infantry battalions.

After a short time used for training and maintenance, the MRF and the South Vietnamese Marines resumed Coronado IX on 9 November, targeting the 263rd and 514th VC Battalions in the Cam Son area. While the 3/47th Infantry and the 5th Marine Battalion made beach assaults early on 9 November, the 4/47th Infantry, which had been moved by Armored Troop Carriers (ATCs) to the Đồng Tâm airstrip, and then in a series of helicopter lifts entered the area of operations. All landings were unopposed and they saw few VC.

On the second day the search for the VC shifted to the east; troops were moved by boat and helicopter into the Ban Long and the Ap Bac base areas. Only the South Vietnamese Marine battalion, which remained in its original location, saw action, killing 7 VC.

On 14 November, to increase security for Highway 4 and the Đồng Tâm Base area, a new operation began, with support from American artillery at Đồng Tâm. While the 3/47th Infantry, remained at the MRF Base, the other battalions were transported by boat and helicopter to the north along the Kinh Xang Canal east of Đồng Tâm Base. The 5th Marine Battalion and the 4/47th Infantry destroyed 63 bunkers and seized 900 kg (2,000 lb) of rice and 90 kg (200 lb) of salt. This operation continued through the night; platoon-sized ambush patrols were sent out along Highway 4 north of Đồng Tâm but could not intercept many VC.

On 16 November the MRF began operations with the 3rd Brigade, 9th Infantry Division and elements of both the ARVN 7th and 9th Divisions along the border of Kien Phong and Dinh Tuong Provinces. The Allied force targeted the VC 502nd Local Force and 267th Main Force Battalions, which IV Corps and II Field Force intelligence predicted were in Base Area 470. Troops of the 3rd Brigade were landed by helicopter in the northern part of the area along with the 3/47th Infantry, which was initially under the control of the 3rd Brigade. Since Base Area 470 lacked firm ground needed for artillery fire support bases, and artillery positioned along Highway 4 could not reach the area, experimental artillery firing platforms were used.

One platform accommodated an M102, 105 mm artillery piece, ammunition, and space for the crews to operate. The legs of the platform were adjustable to various heights and a large metal "foot" on the bottom of each leg, provided support in the muddy rice paddies. A CH-47 helicopter carried the platform, artillery piece, ammunition, and crew to their operational locations in four lifts. One battery of 105mm artillery was used throughout the operation. On the second night of the 3rd Brigade's operations, 17 November, the VC attacked one of the brigade's fire support bases. The attack was repulsed several hours before the MRF entered the operational area off the Mỹ Tho River on the Rach Ruong Canal. To allow the MRF to enter the operational area, IV Corps South Vietnamese engineers, who were accompanying the assault forces early on the morning of 18 November, had to remove the center span of the bridge on the Rach Ruong Canal.

Before the bridge span was removed, a barge-mounted artillery fire support base was set up so that the artillery could fire on any VC troops encountered by the engineers. A 155mm fire support base was also established on Highway 4, 6 km (3.7 mi) east of the bridge. For better control, the MRF Base was moved upstream from Đồng Tâm to an anchorage near Sa Dec. While the 5th Marine Battalion conducted riverine assaults in the southern portions of the area, the 4/47th Infantry landed troops by helicopter in the north.

The lack of contact in the two secret zones and new intelligence suggested that two VC battalions were located in Base Area 470 in western Dinh Tuong Province. The MRF and elements of the 3rd Brigade, 9th Infantry Division, together with ARVN units proceeded to launch Operation Kien Giang 9-1 against Base Area 470 on 15 November.

On 18 November Colonel David's force intercepted the VC 263rd Battalion as they retreated southeast following their attack on Firebase Cudgel. The MRF killed 45 VC, nearly half of these by helicopter gunships, and a large medical cache was uncovered. The MRF, in contrast, had only four injured. Total allied losses were 26 killed and 155 wounded, while the VC suffered 178 killed and 33 captured.

== Second phase ==
Following a period at Đồng Tâm for rest and maintenance, the force returned to Cam Son Base area on 23 November. After the first air attack, a B-52 bomber strike in the heavily populated Dinh Tuong Province, the three allied battalions entered the area by riverine assault craft. Few VC were found and eight were killed. Several caches were discovered.

During 27–30 November operations were conducted to clear VC from the Kinh Xang Canal, running northwest alongside Đồng Tâm. Company D, 15th Engineer Battalion, removed all water blocks along the canal while the maneuver battalions searched the Ap Bac Base area. Five VC were killed and two taken prisoner; four major blocks were removed from the canal and 62 bunkers were destroyed. The opening of the upper reaches of the canal permitted the MRF to use assault craft to attack the VC base in Ap Bac.

On 4 December the MRF Base moved to Sa Dec and the 3rd and 4th Battalions, 47th Infantry, along with the 5th Marine Battalion, began operations to find and destroy elements of the 267th Main Force and 502nd Local Force VC Battalions in western Dinh Tuong and eastern Kien Phong Provinces. The battle that ensued on 4–5 December was one of the biggest during the Operation Coronado series.

Early on 4 December a flotilla of ATCs carrying the 5th Marine Battalion came under fire 12 km (7.5 mi) east of Mỹ Tho from the VC 502nd Local Force Battalion in a fortified base on the west bank of the Rach Ruong Canal. The VC attacked the boats with rockets and automatic weapons and the Marines were landed north of the VC position and proceeded to overrun the position killing over 100 VC and scattering the rest. Shortly afterward the 3/47th Infantry landed south of the VC. The fighting was intense and Colonel David directed the 4/47th Infantry to land by helicopter west of the VC position. To the south the 3/47th Infantry, encountered resistance from scattered VC bunkers that prevented it from linking with the Vietnamese Marines. There were 266 VC killed in total, mostly by Marines. The Marines lost 40 killed and 107 wounded, while the Americans suffered 9 dead and 89 wounded.

The MRF was able to land the Marines with light casualties on 4 December mainly due to a flame thrower aboard one of the ATCs. A vehicle with a flame thrower had been driven aboard an ATC and fired on targets as required. The Americans believed that the flame thrower had a psychological effect on the entrenched VC. On 6 December the MRF moved to an anchorage on the Mekong River north of Vinh Long. After three days of local operations and maintenance work during which new fire support bases were established to support of forthcoming operations, the MRF undertook operations in the southern part of Cai Be District and in the western part of Dinh Tuong Province against local VC and their installations. Initial landings were made from ATCs but later in the first day of operations, troops were brought in by helicopter. Very few VC were found.

On 14 December the MRF again searched for the VC in Cam Son. The Americans made assaults by boat in the southern portion of the base, followed by helicopter landings by the 3/47th Infantry. It was not until the last day of the operation that the VC were discovered, and nine of them were killed.

On 17 December the MRF Base moved to Đồng Tâm to allow the MRF to land troops from the two barracks ships. By the afternoon of 18 December the American brigade and one battalion had moved ashore to Đồng Tâm. USS Colleton left South Vietnam to refit at Subic Bay in the Philippines and USS Benewah moved to Vung Tau on the coast near Saigon to refit. At this time, the 3/60th Infantry replaced the 4/47th Infantry, as part of the MRF, and the 4th Battalion assumed the Đồng Tâm defense mission.

On 19 December a two-battalion operation was initiated in northern Cai Lay District while a third battalion operated near Đồng Tâm. On the night of 19 December, two companies of the 3/47th Infantry, landed along the Kinh Xang Canal to set up ambushes. The other two battalions of the MRF were landed by assault craft in the northern Ap Bac area. Effective artillery coverage was provided by the barge-mounted artillery and Battery C, 2nd Battalion, 35th Artillery (155 mm self-propelled). This operation covered most of the north-central part of Dinh Tuong Province and used both helicopters and boats to bring in troops. The Americans found few VC, killing 11. Navigability of the Kinh Xang Canal was improved during the process when engineers removed a major canal obstruction. The operation was concluded late on 22 December and the MRF returned to base to conduct maintenance and prepare for Christmas truce operations.

== Christmas period ==
The MRF was instructed that only defensive actions should be taken during Christmas period and that they could fire on groups of VC who "seemed to be trying to breed contact" or who were more than "platoon-size" in number. The truce ran for 24 hours starting from 18:00 on 24 December. Prior to 18:00 on the 24th, one MRF battalion moved to each of the two areas where saturation patrols were to be conducted. The 3/47th Infantry, moved to Long Dinh District, while to the southeast the 3/60th Infantry, moved into northern Kien Hoa Province. During the truce period there was occasional sniper and harassing fire from the communists.

The MRF's next operation was in Cai Lay District of Dinh Tuong Province. On 28 December the 3/60th Infantry landed by aircraft and ATC approximately 11 km (6.8 mi) west of Đồng Tâm. It conducted operations directed westward toward Cai Be, with supporting fire from barge artillery batteries located to its south along the north shore of the Mỹ Tho River. Few VC were seen during the operation; Monitors and Assault Support Patrol Boats provided surveillance of inland waterways. On 29 December the 3/60th Infantry, continued operations to the west toward Cai Be, while the 4/47th Infantry, remained in the same area and destroyed 85 bunkers and captured 2 VC. During the day the 3/60th Infantry, found only a few VC and concluded its operations in Cai Lay District.

On 30 December the 4/47th Infantry, was moved from Kien Hoa north and across the Mỹ Tho River to assist the 3/60th Infantry to continue operations in Cai Be and Cai Lay Districts. Although troops were shifted by boat, the battalions could not find large groups of VC. On the following day both battalions went into positions where they stayed until the end of the New Year's truce at 06:00 on 1 January 1968. In groups of platoon and company size, the battalions were dispersed to prevent the VC from using important communication lines during the truce period. Following the truce period the units arrived in Đồng Tâm on the afternoon of 2 January.

== New year ==
The next major mission of the MRF was an outing in eastern Vinh Long Province. On 7 January the battalions landed by air and water but found no VC until mid-afternoon, when a company of the 3/60th Infantry, came under heavy automatic weapons and small arms fire from an estimated two platoons of VC. Artillery support and air strikes were called in on the VC, who were firing from well-prepared, concealed positions. By the end of the encounter, late on 7 January, two more companies of the 3/60th Infantry, were engaged. The Americans killed 28 VC and captured three weapons. The MRF concluded the operation on 8 January, killing two more VC, and returned to the riverine base late that afternoon.

The Americans then targeted the 261st Main Force Battalion in Cai Be District, in western Dinh Tuong Province. On 10 January ATCs and helicopters landed the 4/47th Infantry and 3/60th Infantry, and by mid-afternoon Company A, 3/60th Infantry, was in heavy combat, sustaining moderate casualties after being landed in a VC base area. Company E was flown in to support Company A as heavy fighting continued. The following day fighting was sporadic. Over the two days, the Americans killed 47 while losing 18 and suffering 50 wounded, most during the landing when they were caught out by the VC's well-prepared, camouflaged positions.

On 12 January an operation was conducted in conjunction with the 3d Brigade in Binh Phuoc District of Long An Province. The 3/60th Infantry and 4/47th Infantry, moved by boat along the Cho Cao Canal to assigned beaches. Upon landing, American troops met heavy VC rocket and automatic weapons fire but killed 7 VC. The rest quickly escaped and there was no further fighting during the two-day operation.

On 14 January the 2nd Brigade embarked on USS Benewah, and was followed aboard on 21–22 January by the rest of the MRF. A cordon was set up around the village of An Quoi, near Dong Tam, by the 3/47th Infantry, which had the day before relieved the 4/47th Infantry in the MRF. The cordon operation was unsuccessful in capturing or kill guerrillas, ending Operation Coronado IX.

== Aftermath ==
The operation was regarded as a success because the VC 263rd and 502nd Battalions had been rendered combat ineffective.

== See also ==
- Operation Coronado
- Operation Coronado II
- Operation Coronado IV
- Operation Coronado V
- Operation Coronado XI
