= Operation Coronado =

Series of U.S./ARVN military operations in the Vietnam War

Operation Coronado was a series of 11 operations conducted by the American Mobile Riverine Force in conjunction with various units of the Army of the Republic of Vietnam (South Vietnam) in the waterways of the Mekong Delta in the south of the country in an attempt to dismantle guerrilla forces and infrastructure of the Vietcong in the waterways of the Mekong, which had been a communist stronghold. The operations ran sequentially from June 1967 to July 1968.

The series was named after Coronado Naval Base in California. There the American military had staged planning conference before adopting their riverine military strategy.

== See also ==
- Operation Coronado II
- Operation Coronado IV
- Operation Coronado V
- Operation Coronado IX
- Operation Coronado X
- Operation Coronado XI
