= Operation Concordia (Vietnam War) =

Part of the Vietnam War (1967)

- Part of the Vietnam War
Date	19–21 June 1967
Location	Mekong Delta, South Vietnam 10.55°N 106.685°E
Result	Allies claim victory

Belligerents
United States; South Vietnam	Viet Cong

Units involved
(United States) 47th Infantry Regiment: 3rd Battalion; 4th Battalion; (United States) 60th Infantry Regiment: 2nd Battalion; (South Vietnam) 46th Infantry Regiment	5th Nha Be Battalion

Casualties and losses
(United States) 46 killed	255 killed

Operation Concordia was an operation conducted by the U.S. Mobile Riverine Force in conjunction with the Army of the Republic of Vietnam (ARVN) from 19–21 June 1967 against the Viet Cong (VC). It resulted in a US/ARVN victory.

== Background ==
Cần Giuộc District in Long An Province was a VC stronghold in the Mekong Delta. The operation plan called for the deployment of five Companies of the 3rd and 4th Battalions, 47th Infantry Regiment into the operations area by assault craft and sweep south towards the ARVN 2nd Battalion, 46th Infantry blocking positions near the town of Ap Bac in Tien Giang Province. Company C, 3/47th Infantry would act as reserve.

== Operation ==
On the morning of 19 June 3 Companies of the 4/47th Infantry were landed 4 km southeast of Cần Giuộc, two Companies of the 3/47th Infantry were landed 1.6 km south of Cần Giuộc while the ARVN 2/46th Infantry was landed near Ap Bac.

At 10:00 U.S. intelligence learned that a battalion size VC force was located east of the ARVN blocking position. Company C, 3/47th Infantry was deployed by helicopters south of the reported VC location while Company C, 4/47th Infantry was moved by patrol craft northeast of the location. By 11:50 Company C 3/47th Infantry had swept the area but failed to locate any VC, however Company C, 4/47th Infantry encountered VC positions as they moved west. At the same time Company A, 4/47th Infantry moving south towards Company C, 4/47th Infantry walked into an L-shaped ambush from well-entrenched VC; exposed on open rice paddies the Company sustained heavy casualties. Artillery and air support could not be used initially due to confusion over the location of the 4/47th Platoons, but from 12:00 helicopter gunship and artillery fire began to supplement the fire from small arms and nearby patrol craft.

Company B, 4/47th Infantry was moved behind Company A while Company C, 3/47th Infantry was deployed north and then began to assault towards the east joining up with Companies A and B approaching from the northwest. Companies B and C continued attacking east, while Company A moved into a blocking position to the north. By 20:00 darkness and enemy fire stopped the assault with Companies B and C, 3/47th Infantry, still some 600 meters west of the ambush site.

With nightfall the casualties of Company A, 4/47th Infantry were able to be evacuated, while most of the VC were able to escape through gaps in the U.S. positions. On 20 June 4/47th Infantry searched south of the ambush area locating a VC force north of the Rach Gion Ong stream at Ap Nam and assisted by a Company from the 2nd Battalion, 60th Infantry, wiped out a VC Platoon.

== Aftermath ==
The operation concluded on 21 June, U.S. casualties were 46 killed and 15 sailors wounded, while claiming VC losses of 255 killed. Due to its location east of a town called Ap Bac, the 19 June ambush is sometimes referred to as Second Ap Bac after the disastrous Battle of Ap Bac on 2 January 1963, however that battle took place approximately 40 km further west.
