= 47th Infantry Regiment (United States) =

Infantry regiment of the United States Army

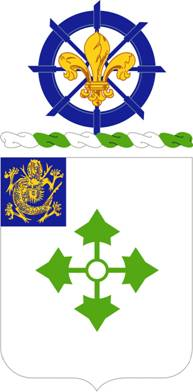
- Founded: 1917
- Country: United States
- Branch: United States Army
- Type: Infantry basic training
- Size: Regiment
- Garrison/HQ: Fort Benning
- Motto: Ex Virtute Honos (Honor Comes From Virtue)
- Engagements: World War I World War II; Vietnam War

Commanders
- Current commander: 2d Bn – LTC James I. Vansandt III; 3d Bn – LTC Mychajlo Eliaszewskyi
- Notable commanders: Alexander Patch; Edwin Randle; George W. Smythe

Insignia
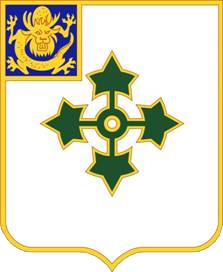
- Distinctive unit insignia

The 47th Infantry Regiment is an infantry regiment of the United States Army. Constituted in 1917 at Camp Syracuse, New York, the regiment fought in World War I, and was later inactivated in 1921. Remaining nominally inactive throughout the interwar period but composed of Organized Reserve personnel, the 47th Infantry was reactivated in 1940 and subsequently fought during World War II in North Africa, Sicily, and Western Europe, then was inactivated in 1946. During the Cold War, the regiment saw multiple activations and inactivations, with service both in the Regular Army and the Army Reserve; it fought in South Vietnam. Ultimately it was reactivated as a training regiment, and as of 1999, it has been assigned to Fort Benning and consists of two active battalions.

== History ==
=== The Great War ===
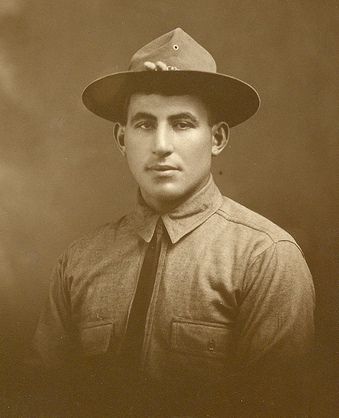
World War I Medal of Honor recipient Sergeant William Shemin of the regiment's Company G

The 47th Infantry Regiment was organized at Camp Syracuse, near Syracuse, New York, on 1 June 1917, almost two months after the American entry into World War I, with a cadre from the 9th Infantry Regiment; Initially assigned to Major General George H. Cameron's 4th Division; within the division the regiment was part of Brigadier General Benjamin A. Poore's 7th Infantry Brigade. By May 1918, the regiment arrived at Brest, France, training until July. In late July, the regiment along with the rest of the 7th Infantry Brigade, was briefly attached to the VII French Army Corps near Bois du Chitelet; it was then sent to bolster the beleaguered 42nd Division at Ourcq. In early August, the regiment fought near Bazoches-sur-Vesles during the Second Battle of the Marne. In September and October 1918, the regiment fought near Cuisy, Septsarges, and Brieulles-sur-Meuse; (Note: During the Meuse–Argonne offensive, a battalion of the regiment was commanded by Major James Stevens. During the battle the regimental surgeon, Major Harrison Webster, was killed.) during this period of time Colonel Troy H. Middleton took command of the regiment, having previously commanded the regiment's 1st Battalion. It ended the war near Fays, Vosges, and served in the Army of Occupation near Koblenz until July 1919.

=== Interwar period ===
The 47th Infantry Regiment arrived at the port of New York on 16 July 1919 on the troopship USS Mobile. Emergency period personnel were discharged from the service in New York, and the regiment was transferred 2 August 1919 to Camp Dodge, Iowa, and to Camp Lewis, Washington, on 2 August 1920. The 47th Infantry Regiment was inactivated on 22 September 1921 at Camp Lewis and along with the 4th Division, was allotted to the Fourth Corps Area for mobilization responsibility. On 27 July 1921, the 58th Infantry Regiment had been designated the 47th Infantry's "Active Associate," that would provide the personnel to reactivate the unit in the event of war. Upon inactivation of the 47th Infantry, the personnel were transferred to the 3rd Division's 7th Infantry Regiment at Camp Lewis.

The 58th Infantry Regiment was relieved as Active Associate on 17 July 1922, and the 22nd Infantry Regiment was designated as Active Associate. The 47th Infantry was organized on 25 July 1926 with Organized Reserve personnel as a "Regular Army Inactive" unit with headquarters at Starkville, Mississippi. The regiment was affiliated with the Agricultural and Mechanical College of Mississippi's ROTC program on 25 February 1927 and was organized, less the 3rd Battalion, at Starkville with Regular Army instructors assigned to the ROTC detachment and Reserve officers commissioned from the program. An Organized Reserve officer functioned as the day-to-day commander of the regiment, but the professor of military science and tactics at Mississippi A&M was designated the regimental commander for mobilization purposes. Concurrently, the 3rd Battalion was affiliated with the Louisiana State University ROTC program and organized at Baton Rouge, Louisiana. The 22nd Infantry was relieved on 30 June 1927 as Active Associate. The 47th Infantry was relieved from the 4th Division on 15 August 1927 and assigned to the 7th Division, and relieved from the 7th Division on 1 October 1933. It participated in the 1938 Third Army maneuvers in the De Soto National Forest in Mississippi by providing numerous Reserve officers as umpires. The regimental headquarters was transferred by 1939 to Baton Rouge. The regiment conducted summer training most years at Fort McPherson, Georgia, and some years at Fort Screven, Georgia. As an alternate form of summer training, the regiment conducted infantry Citizens Military Training Camps some years at Camp Beauregard, Louisiana. The 47th Infantry was assigned to the reactivated 9th Infantry Division on 1 August 1940, and activated on 10 August 1940, less Reserve personnel, at Fort Bragg, North Carolina. The regiment was briefly commanded by Colonel Alexander Patch in the summer of 1941; after the Japanese attack on Pearl Harbor, Patch was reassigned to the Pacific Theater of Operations.

=== World War II ===
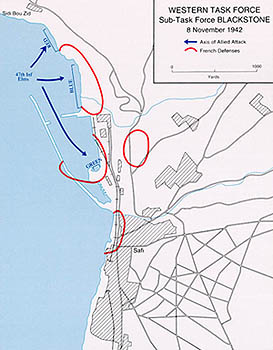
Map of landings of the regiment at Safi, Morocco

In November 1942, the regiment took part in Operation Blackstone in North Africa, where it fought against Vichy French forces during an amphibious landing; the regiment's Company K were the first American troops to land in French Morocco. At the time of the regiment was commanded by Colonel Edwin Randle. Following its actions during Operation Torch, of which Blackstone was a part, the regiment took part in divisional duties of monitor Spanish Morocco, which lasted into early 1943; during this time, the regiment conducted a foot march of more than 200 miles (320 km) from Safi to Port-Lyautey.

Still in North Africa, along with the rest of the 9th Infantry Division (United States), the regiment fought in the Battle of El Guettar, which resulted in a significant number of casualties; for actions during the battle, the regiment's commander, received the Distinguished Service Cross (he would later go on to be promoted to be the assistant division commander of the 77th Division). Following El Guettar, the regiment moved north, and fought in the Battle of Sedjenane, and soldiers of the regiment's 2d Battalion, were the first Allied soldiers in Bizerte. After Colonel Randle was promoted and parted ways with the regiment, Colonel George W. Smythe became the regiment's commander. Along with the rest of the 9th Infantry Division, the regiment was sent to Sicily, in 1943; in Sicily the regiment was tangentially involved during the Battle of Troina, which saw the 9th Infantry Division's other infantry regiments in significant combat.

Remaining in Sicily after the Axis forces retreated, the regiment received orders to move in November 1943, making its way to England; with the rest of the 9th Infantry Division, the regiment trained until June 1944. The division was garrisoned around Winchester and during this time a number of personnel married local women. While stationed around Alresford, the regiment adopted a dog as a mascot which died when struck by a vehicle in May 1944. The dog's marked grave is still in place in Alresford.

On 10 June, four days after D-Day, the 9th Infantry Division landed at Utah Beach. Assigned to VII Corps, it was allocated to the liberation of the Cotentin Peninsula and was the division that sealed off the peninsula to prevent additional German reinforcements from breaking through. Medical supplies for the regiment had been lost during its movement from England to Normandy, but were replaced and captured German vehicles were pressed into service by the regiment's medical detachment. By 14 June, the entire regiment had landed, and the following day the 47th began combat operations, fighting alongside regiments of the 82nd Airborne Division, attacking along a path which was near, or included, Orglandes, Hautteville-Bocage, and Ste. Colombe. The regiment reached Saint-Lô-d'Ourville, via Saint-Sauveur-le-Vicomte, Saint-Sauveur-de-Pierrepont, and Neuville-en-Beaumont, by 18 June.

Relieved by the 357th Infantry Regiment (of the 90th Infantry Division) along the English Channel, facing Jersey, the regiment moved to Saint-Jacques-de-Néhou where it began its push northward to Vasteville, via Bricquebec; on 20 June it began its push towards Cherbourg, but was initially halted near Sideville by stiff German prepared defenses around the outskirts of the port city. On 22 June, the attack on Cherbourg began, with the regiment errantly being attacked by aircraft of the IX Bomber Command, and the 39th Infantry Regiment following behind its advancement; by the 24th the regiment had broken through the enemy defenses, and along with the 39th, where fighting within the suburb of Octeville. The regiment continued to fight in the western portion of Cherbourg, and by the 26th it captured German General Karl-Wilhelm von Schlieben and Admiral Walter Hennecke. The city fell to the Allies by the next day; following the liberation of the port city, along with the 60th Infantry Regiment, the 47th fought the remaining German forces in Cap de la Hague, ultimately capturing over 6,000 Germans by 1 July.

By 10 July, the 9th Infantry Division was tasked to join the effort to liberate Saint-Lô; the next day it was attacked by the Panzer Lehr Division. On 11 July, wounded men and medical officers of the regiment's third battalion, were captured by German forces; one of the medical officers would later be killed by friendly fire and buried at Aisne-Marne American Cemetery and Memorial, while the other was liberated at Château-Thierry while taking care of wounded prisoners of war. In early August the regiment, along with the 60th Infantry Regiment, was fighting in the area of Gathemo. The liberation of Château-Thierry occurred on 27 August, while the 9th Infantry Division was following the wake of the movement of the 3d Armored Division.

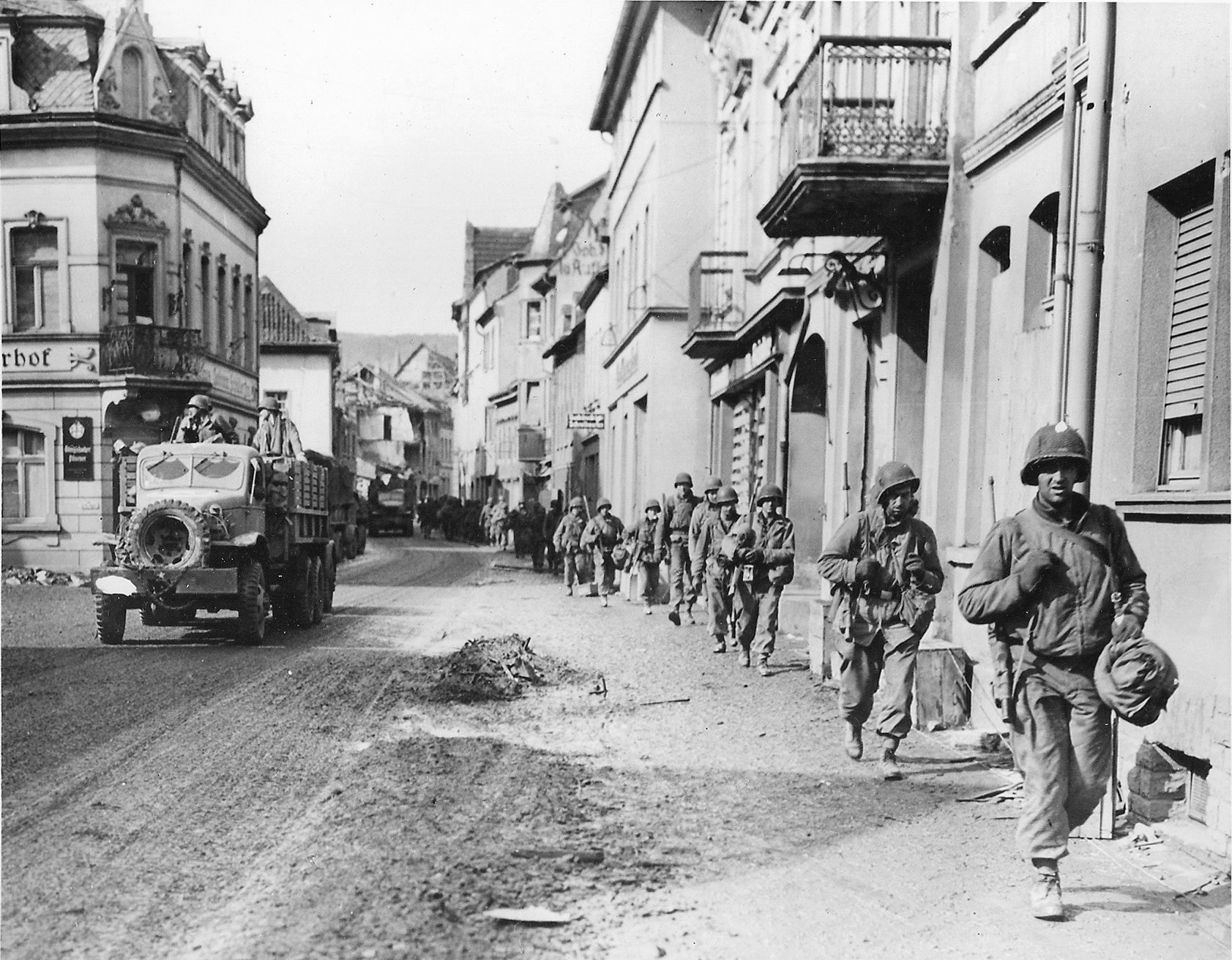
Soldiers of the 47th Infantry Regiment, march through Remagen, in March 1945

On 14 September, the regiment entered Germany, at or near, Roetgen; it was the first German city to fall to the Allies. The regiment penetrated the Siegfried Line near Schevenhütte on 16 September. This was followed by fighting in the Hürtgen Forest; during the battle the regiment captured Frenzerburg Castle. By 30 September, the regiment had lost 163 officers; one company alone lost 18 officers killed, leading to a loss of experienced leadership over time. During the Battle of the Bulge, the regiment served as a cornerstone of American resistance around Eupen. The regiment had the distinction of another first; on 8 March 1945, soldiers of the regiment became the first infantry troops to cross the Rhine River, doing so at Remagen; for its actions during the crossing of the Rhine, the regiment was awarded a Distinguished Unit Citation. During March the regiment experienced multiple changes in command, at the beginning of the month Colonel Smythe departed the regiment, leaving Lieutenant Colonel Herman A. Schmidt to act as the regiment's commanding officer, only to be succeeded by Colonel Peter O. Ward a week later.

By early April, the 9th Infantry Division was assigned to III Corps, and was part of the effort against the Ruhr Pocket; once again the Panzer Lehr Division attacked the 9th Infantry Division. For its actions in repelling the attack the regiment earned another Distinguished Unit Citation. By mid-April 1945, the 9th Infantry Division was reassigned to VII Corps, and fought against remaining German forces in the Harz Mountains; there they encountered concentration camps near Nordhausen. After the Germans surrendered, the regiment conducted occupation duty in Germany, which lasted until late 1946.

Part of the Regiment's postwar occupation duty included a stint at the Dachau Concentration Camp. Elements of the 47th were assigned guard and administrative duty from July, 1945. By this time Dachau had been converted to its postwar use as an internment camp that would intern former SS, Nazi functionaries, and officers of the German army.

In December 1946, the regiment was deactivated in Germany.

=== Cold War ===
In July 1947 the regiment was reactivated at Fort Dix. In 1957, the regiment was reorganized into the Combat Arms Regimental System. (Note: This occurred around the time of the Pentomic reorganization of the army.) In 1957, the regiment's 2d Battalion was relieved from the 9th Infantry Division, returning to assignment with the 4th Infantry Division. Also 1957, the regiment's 3d Battalion was inactivated and relieved from the 9th Infantry Division, and two years later allotted to the United States Army Reserves' 81st Infantry Division.

In 1961, the regiment's 2nd Battle Group (the redesignated 2d Battalion) was deployed to Germany. Stationed in Berlin, the regiment remained there for a year; the following year the regiment's 2d Battalion was inactivated at Fort Lewis, and the 3d Battalion was inactivated at Atlanta. In July 1963, the 1st Battalion was reactivated as a part of the 171st Infantry Brigade. In 1966, at Fort Riley, both the 2d and 3d Battalions were reactivated, with the 3d Battalion being reassigned to 9th Infantry Division.

==== Vietnam ====
In Vietnam, the regiment fought in the Mekong Delta, where it conducted riverine warfare. Along with other units assigned to the 9th Infantry Division, the regiment was based out of Đồng Tâm Base Camp; however, the regiment's 3d Battalion was based in Kiến Hòa province. In addition to riverine operations, the regiment also conducted air mobile operations.

During the conflict three of the regiment's battalions served; the 2d Battalion was deployed from January 1967 until October 1970, the 3d Battalion was deployed from January 1967 until July 1969, and the 4th Battalion was deployed January 1967 until July 1969. For the most part the regiment's battalions were assigned to the 9th Infantry Division's 2d Brigade, except for the 2d Battalion, which was temporarily assigned at various times in 1968 to the division's other two brigades. (Note: During 1967 and 1968, Chuck Hagel served in Vietnam as a sergeant within 2d Battalion's Company B. In fiction, Forrest Gump is shown to be a member of the regiment, wearing the regiment's distinctive unit insignia on his Class A Dress Green Uniform. In the film he is cast as a member of the 2d Battalion, 47th Infantry, then a unit of the 9th Infantry Division in the Vietnam War.) During its time in Vietnam, the regiment conducted joint operations with the United States Navy, during which its soldiers deployed from, and billeted aboard, naval vessels.

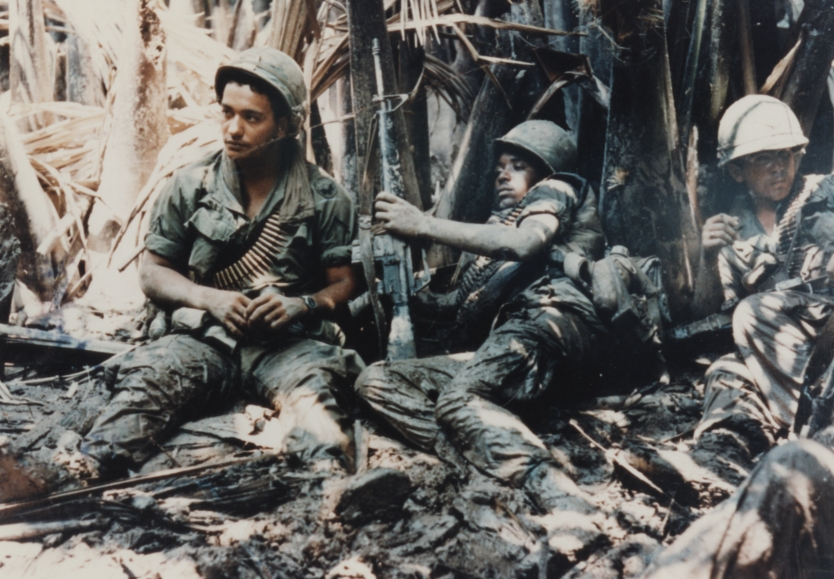
Soldiers of Company B, 3d Battalion, 47th Infantry, 9th Infantry Division at My Tho in April 1968

In 1966, upon learning of the regiment's upcoming riverine mission, the regiment's leadership worked with the Navy's Amphibious Training School, in Coronado, to gain the skills needed for the expected deployment. In January 1967, the regiment deployed from Fort Riley, by way of San Francisco, disembarking at Vũng Tàu. From mid-February to late-March 1967, the regiment's 3d Battalion conducted combat training, with the USS Whitfield County (LST-1169) and the 9th River Assault Squadron, in the Rung Sat Special Zone. In April and May 1967, the regiment's 4th Battalion conducted operations in the Rung Sat Special Zone.

Beginning in April 1967, the regiment's 3d Battalion deployed to the Mekong Delta proper. By May of that same year it began to conduct combat operations near Ap Bac; that same month, the regiment's 4th Battalion completed operations in Rung Sat and began operations in the Mekong Delta. On 19 May 1967, the 2d Brigade's headquarters came under attack on the banks of the Mỹ Tho River, and the regiment's 3d Battalion was heavily engaged in thwarting the attack. In June 1967, the regiment took part in Operation Concordia, with the USS Colleton (APB-36) providing medical support. In early July 1967, operations were conducted in the Gò Công Province; at the end of that month, the regiment moved to Can Guioc. In August, and early September, the regiment operated in the Long An Province, supporting units from the Republic of Vietnam Marine Division. From October 1967 until January 1968, the regiment was involved in Operations Coronado V & IX, which ended when the regiment embarked on the USS Benewah (APB-35).

During the Tet Offensive, in early February, the regiment fought heavily in and around Mỹ Tho in Operation Coronado X. (Note: Later-Major General William Matz served in the regiment's 3rd Battalion, being injured during the Tet Offensive.) From mid-February and into early March, the regiment took part in Operation Coronado XI. Following that operation, the regiment took part in Operation Truong Cong Dinh until April. Several helicopters were lost due to enemy fire, and two artillery barges sunk; the Benewah was struck by enemy fire, and one LCM was sunk. In July, the regiment's 4th Battalion conducted operations with the South Vietnamese Army's 9th Division. In October, two of the regiment's battalions conducted pacification operations in Kiến Hòa province.

=== Post-Vietnam and 21st century ===
Following the regiment's deployment to Vietnam, its battalions were progressively inactivated. The 3d Battalion was the first to be inactivated, doing so at Fort Riley in August 1969; this was followed by the 2d Battalion, which was inactivated at Fort Lewis in October 1970, and the 1st Battalion in November 1972. This period of inactivation was short lived, as the 2d Battalion was reactivated at Fort Lewis in November 1972, while the 3d Battalion was reactivated at the same base in March 1973. During the remainder of the 1970s and into the late 1980s, the 2d and 3d Battalions remained with the 9th Infantry Division. although, the regiment was withdrawn from the Combat Arms Regimental System and was reorganized into the United States Army Regimental System. Under then commander, LTC Stuart H. Watkins, the 2d Battalion was attached to the 4th Squadron, 9th Cavalry. This unique Infantry unit operating in an air brigade developed sling ops doctrine for highly mobile anti-tank platoons validated in a Yakima FTX defeating a national guard unit representing a soviet OPFOR armored brigade. This attachment continued until August 1988 when the 2d Battalion was inactivated again. In 1991, the 9th Infantry Division was inactivated; due to this the 3d Battalion was assigned to the 199th Infantry Brigade, but was later inactivated in January 1994 at Fort Polk.

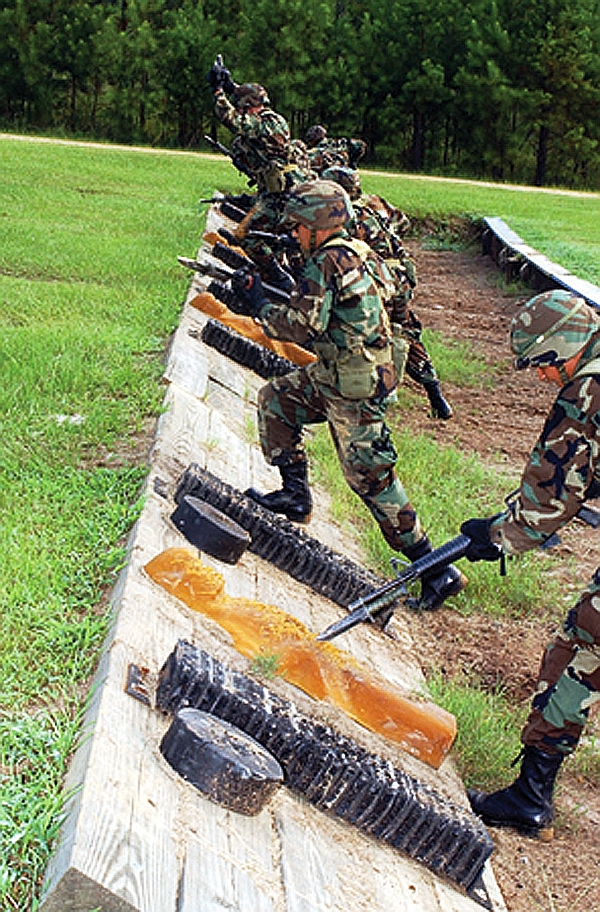
Soldiers of 3d Battalion at the bayonet assault course at Sand Hill in 2003.

In April 1996, the regiment was transferred to the United States Army Training and Doctrine Command. From the regiment's transfer to Training and Doctrine Command, until February 1999, the regiment was stationed at Fort Leonard Wood; beginning in March 1999 the regiment has been stationed at Fort Benning. As of December 2013, 2d Battalion, 47th Infantry Regiment is stationed at Sand Hill; the battalion falls under the 194th Armored Brigade, and Maneuver Center of Excellence. On 8 April 2013, an inactivation ceremony was held for the 3d Battalion, 47th Infantry Regiment, resulting in a reduction of 44 soldier and 27 civilian positions. On 4 March 2019, 3d Battalion was re-activated in the 198th Infantry Brigade for infantry one station unit training.

== Regimental lineage ==
The regiment's lineage is as follows:

- Constituted 15 May 1917 in the Regular Army as the 47th Infantry
- Organized 1 June 1917 at Syracuse, New York
- Assigned 19 November 1917 to the 4th Division
- Inactivated 22 September 1921 at Camp Lewis, Washington
- Relieved 15 August 1927 from assignment to the 4th Division and assigned to the 7th Division
- Relieved 1 October 1933 from assignment to the 7th Division
- Assigned 1 August 1940 to the 9th Division (later redesignated as the 9th Infantry Division)
- Activated 10 August 1940 at Fort Bragg, North Carolina
- Inactivated 31 December 1946 in Germany
- Activated 15 July 1947 at Fort Dix, New Jersey
- Relieved 1 December 1957 from assignment to the 9th Infantry Division and reorganized as a parent regiment under the Combat Arms Regimental System
- Withdrawn 16 June 1986 from the Combat Arms Regimental System and reorganized under the United States Army Regimental System
- Transferred 15 April 1996 to the United States Army Training and Doctrine Command

== Honors ==
The regiment's campaign participation credits, and decorations, are as follows:

=== Campaign participation credit ===
World War I: Aisne-Marne; St. Mihiel; Meuse-Argonne; Champagne 1918; Lorraine 1918

World War II: Algeria-French Morocco (with arrowhead); Tunisia; Sicily; Normandy; Northern France; Rhineland; Ardennes-Alsace; Central Europe

Vietnam: Counteroffensive, Phase II; Counteroffensive, Phase III; Tet Counteroffensive; Counteroffensive, Phase IV; Counteroffensive, Phase V; Counteroffensive, Phase VI; Tet 69/Counteroffensive; Summer-Fall 1969; Winter-Spring 1970; Sanctuary Counteroffensive; Counteroffensive, Phase VII

=== Decorations ===
- Presidential Unit Citation (Army) for Cherbourg
- Presidential Unit Citation (Army) for Hague Peninsula
- Presidential Unit Citation (Army) for Wilhelmshoe, Germany
- Presidential Unit Citation (Army) for Roetgen, Germany
- Presidential Unit Citation (Army) for Nothberg, Germany
- Presidential Unit Citation (Army) for Freuzenbeg Castle
- Presidential Unit Citation (Army) for Remagen, Germany
- Presidential Unit Citation (Army) for Oberkirchen, Germany
- Presidential Unit Citation (Army) for Mekong Delta
- Valorous Unit Award for Long Binh – Bien Hoa
- Valorous Unit Award for Saigon
- Valorous Unit Award for Fish Hook
- Meritorious Unit Commendation (Army) for Vietnam 1968
- French Croix de Guerre with Palm, World War II for Cherbourg
- Belgian Fourragere 1940
  - Cited in the Order of the Day of the Belgian Army for action at the Meuse River
  - Cited in the Order of the Day of the Belgian Army for action in the Ardennes

== See also ==
=== Medal of Honor recipients ===
- Specialist Four Edward A. DeVore Jr. Vietnam War
- Private First Class James W. Fous Vietnam War
- Specialist Four George C. Lang Vietnam War
- Sergeant William Shemin World War I
- Private First Class Carl V. Sheridan World War II
