= William Shemin =

US Army sergeant (1896–1973)

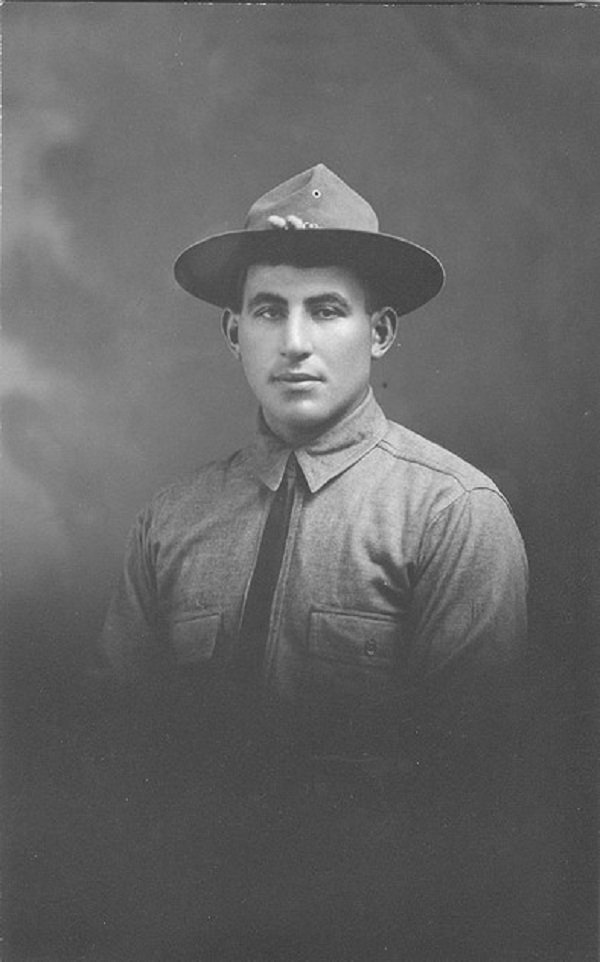
- Born: October 14, 1896; Bayonne, New Jersey
- Died: August 15, 1973 (aged 76); New York City
- Burial place: Baron Hirsch Cemetery
- Military career
- Allegiance: United States of America
- Branch: United States Army
- Service years: 1917 - 1919
- Rank: Sergeant
- Service number: 558173
- Units: Company G, 2nd Battalion, 47th Infantry Regiment, 4th Infantry Division
- Conflicts: World War I: Second Battle of the Marne
- Awards: Medal of Honor; Purple Heart

William Shemin (October 14, 1896 – August 15, 1973) was a Sergeant in the U.S. Army during World War I. He was awarded the Medal of Honor for bravery in action at Vesle River, near Bazoches, France. On June 2, 2015, William Shemin's daughters Elsie Shemin-Roth and Ina Bass accepted the nation's highest military award for valor on behalf of their father from President Barack Obama at the White House. Shemin was assigned to Company G, 47th Infantry Regiment, 4th Division, American Expeditionary Forces. The reason of the belated award is that in 2001, the U.S. Army began a review of all WWI awards to Jewish soldiers, and Shemin's previous Distinguished Service Cross was upgraded to the Medal of Honor.

== Biography ==
William "Bill" Shemin was born in Bayonne, New Jersey to Russian Jewish immigrants. During his teenage years, he played semi-pro baseball. He graduated from the New York State Ranger School in 1914, and went on to work as a forester in Bayonne. Shemin enlisted in the Army, October 2, 1917. Upon completion of basic training at Camp Greene, North Carolina, he was assigned as a rifleman to Company G, 47th Infantry Regiment, 4th Infantry Division, American Expeditionary Forces, in France.

While serving as a rifleman from August 7–9, 1918, Shemin left the cover of his platoon's trench and crossed open space, repeatedly exposing himself to heavy machine gun and rifle fire to rescue the wounded. After officers and senior non-commissioned officers had become casualties, Shemin took command of the platoon and displayed great initiative under fire, until he was wounded on August 9. It was for this action that Shemin was originally awarded the Distinguished Service Cross on December 19, 1919. Some 96 years later, this Distinguished Service Cross award would be upgraded to the Medal of Honor. Shemin was hospitalized for three months as a result of the wounds he suffered in this action which included those from shrapnel and a machine gun bullet that pierced his helmet and lodged behind his left ear. Following his recovery, he served on light duty as part of the Army occupation in Germany and Belgium until he completed his tour. Shemin received the Purple Heart for his combat wounds.

Shemin was honorably discharged in August 1919, and went on to get a degree from the New York State College of Forestry at Syracuse University. After graduation, he started a greenhouse and landscaping business in the Bronx, New York, where he raised three children. Shemin died in 1973.

With the most utter disregard for his own safety, (Shemin) sprang from his position in his platoon trench, dashed out across the open in full sight of the Germans, who opened and maintained a furious burst of machine gun and rifle fire.

— Capt. Rupert Purdon, one of Shemin's superiors.

== Medal of Honor citation ==
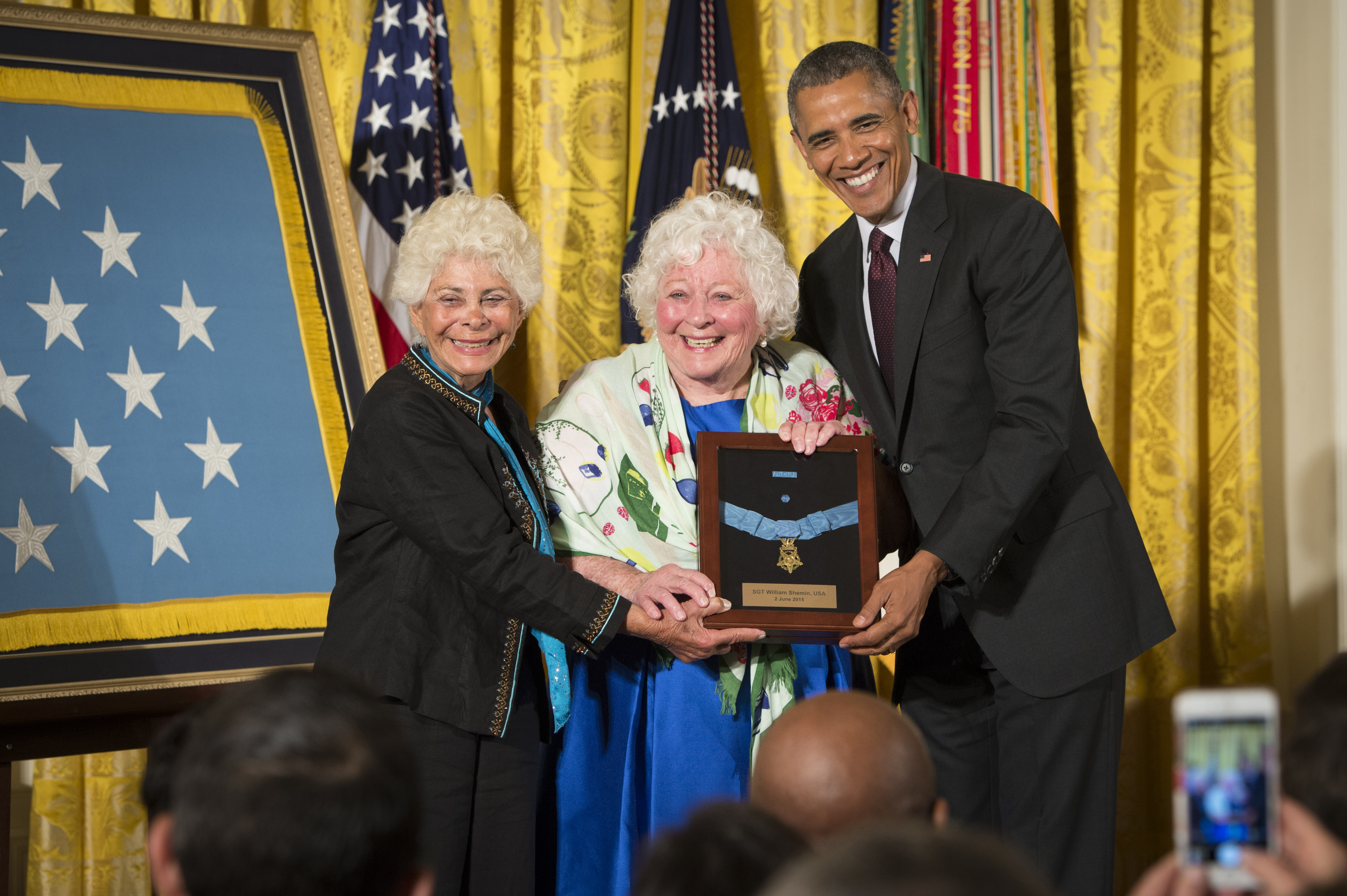
President Barack Obama awards the Medal of Honor to Shamin's daughters

The President of the United States of America, authorized by Act of Congress, March 3, 1863, has awarded in the name of Congress the Medal of Honor to:

SERGEANT WILLIAM SHEMIN
United States Army

For conspicuous gallantry and intrepidity at the risk of his life above and beyond the call of duty:

Sergeant Shemin distinguished himself by acts of gallantry and intrepidity above and beyond the call of duty while serving as a Rifleman with G Company, 2d Battalion, 47th Infantry Regiment, 4th Division, American Expeditionary Forces, in connection with combat operations against an armed enemy on the Vesle River, near Bazoches, France from August 7 to August 9, 1918. Sergeant Shemin left cover and crossed open space, repeatedly exposing himself to heavy machine-gun and rifle fire, to rescue wounded. After Officers and Senior Noncommissioned Officers had become casualties, Sergeant Shemin took command of the platoon and displayed great initiative under fire until wounded on August 9. Sergeant Shemin's extraordinary heroism and selflessness, above and beyond the call of duty, are in keeping with the highest traditions of the military service and reflect great credit upon himself, his unit, and the United States Army.

== Military awards ==
Shemin's military decorations and awards include:

1st row	Medal of Honor		
2nd row	Purple Heart	World War I Victory Medal w/two bronze service stars to denote credit for the Aisne-Marne and Defensive Sector battle clasps	Army of Occupation of Germany Medal

== See also ==
- List of Medal of Honor recipients
- List of Jewish Medal of Honor recipients
- List of Medal of Honor recipients for World War I
