= James W. Fous =

United States Army Medal of Honor recipient (1946–1968)

- Army Medal of Honor
- Born: October 14, 1946; Omaha, Nebraska, US
- Died: May 14, 1968 (aged 21); Kiến Hòa Province, Republic of Vietnam
- Military career
- Allegiance: United States
- Branch: United States Army
- Service years: 1967 - 1968
- Rank: Private First Class
- Units: 47th Infantry Regiment, 9th Infantry Division
- Conflicts: Vietnam War †
- Awards: Medal of Honor; Bronze Star; Purple Heart

James William Fous (October 14, 1946 – May 14, 1968) was a United States Army soldier and a recipient of the United States military's highest decoration—the Medal of Honor—for his actions in the Vietnam War.

== Biography ==
Fous was born in Omaha, Nebraska, on October 14, 1946, and graduated from that city's Central High School in 1964. He subsequently attended the University of Nebraska at Omaha, and joined the Army from his hometown in 1967.

By May 14, 1968, was serving as a Private First Class in Company E, 4th Battalion, 47th Infantry Regiment, 9th Infantry Division. On that day, in Kiến Hòa Province, Republic of Vietnam, Fous smothered the blast of an enemy-thrown hand grenade with his body, sacrificing his life to protect the soldiers around him.

== Medal of Honor citation ==
Private Fous' official Medal of Honor citation reads:

For conspicuous gallantry and intrepidity in action at the risk of his life above and beyond the call of duty. Pfc. Fous distinguished himself at the risk of his life while serving as a rifleman with Company E. Pfc. Fous was participating in a reconnaissance-in-force mission when his unit formed its perimeter defense for the night. Pfc. Fous, together with 3 other American soldiers, occupied a position in a thickly vegetated area facing a woodline. Pfc. Fous detected 3 Viet Cong maneuvering toward his position and, after alerting the other men, directed accurate fire upon the enemy soldiers, silencing 2 of them. The third Viet Cong soldier managed to escape in the thick vegetation after throwing a hand grenade into Pfc. Fous' position. Without hesitation, Pfc. Fous shouted a warning to his comrades and leaped upon the lethal explosive, absorbing the blast with his body to save the lives of the 3 men in the area at the sacrifice of his life. Pfc. Fous' extraordinary heroism at the cost of his life were in keeping with the highest traditions of the military service and reflect great credit upon himself, his unit, and the U.S. Army.

== See also ==
- List of Medal of Honor recipients for the Vietnam War
