= Thomas James Kinsman =

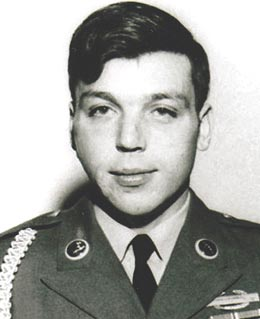
- Born: March 4, 1945; Renton, Washington, U.S.
- Died: May 15, 2017 (aged 72); Toledo, Washington, U.S.
- Burial place: Saint Francis Xavier Cemetery, Toledo, Washington
- Military career
- Allegiance: United States of America
- Branch: United States Army
- Service years: 1967 - 1970
- Rank: Specialist Four
- Units: Company B, 3rd Battalion, 60th Infantry Regiment, 9th Infantry Division
- Conflicts: Vietnam War
- Awards: Medal of Honor Purple Heart Vietnam Service Medal Vietnam Campaign Medal

Thomas James Kinsman (March 4, 1945 – May 15, 2017) was a United States Army soldier and a recipient of the United States military's highest decoration—the Medal of Honor—for his actions in the Vietnam War.

== Personal life ==
Kinsman was born in Renton, Washington on March 4, 1945, and attended high school in Onalaska, Washington before moving to Toledo, Washington. He married Deloris Binion in 1971 and with her had seven children. The couple resided in Toledo, Washington where he farmed. He died at the age of 72 in 2017.

== Military career ==
Kinsman joined the Army from Seattle, Washington in 1967, and by February 6, 1968, was serving as a Private First Class in Company B, 3rd Battalion, 60th Infantry Regiment, 9th Infantry Division. During a firefight on that day, near Vinh Long in the Republic of Vietnam during Operation Coronado X, Kinsman blocked a grenade blast with his body to protect those around him, suffering severe wounds in the process. He recovered from his wounds and was promoted to Specialist Four and awarded the Medal of Honor for his actions.

== Medal of Honor citation ==
Specialist Kinsman's official Medal of Honor citation reads:

For conspicuous gallantry and intrepidity in action at the risk of his life above and beyond the call of duty Sp4c. Kinsman (then Pfc.) distinguished himself in action in the afternoon while serving as a rifleman with Company B, on a reconnaissance-in-force mission. As his company was proceeding up a narrow canal in Armored Troop Carriers, it came under sudden and intense rocket, automatic weapons and small-arms fire from a well entrenched Viet Cong force. The company immediately beached and began assaulting the enemy bunker complex. Hampered by exceedingly dense undergrowth which limited visibility to 10 meters, a group of 8 men became cut off from the main body of the company. As they were moving through heavy enemy fire to effect a link-up, an enemy soldier in a concealed position hurled a grenade into their midst. Sp4c. Kinsman immediately alerted his comrades of the danger, then unhesitatingly threw himself on the grenade and blocked the explosion with his body. As a result of his courageous action, he received severe head and chest wounds. Through his indomitable courage, complete disregard for his personal safety and profound concern for his fellow soldiers, Sp4c. Kinsman averted loss of life and injury to the other 7 men of his element. Sp4c. Kinsman's extraordinary heroism at the risk of his life, above and beyond the call of duty, are in keeping with the highest traditions of the military service and reflect great credit upon himself, his unit, and the U.S. Army.

== See also ==
- List of Medal of Honor recipients
- List of Medal of Honor recipients for the Vietnam War
