= George C. Lang =

US Army Medal of Honor recipient (1947–2005)

- Army Medal of Honor
- Born: April 20, 1947; Flushing, New York, US
- Died: March 16, 2005 (aged 57); Seaford, New York, US
- Burial place: Cemetery of the Holy Rood, Westbury, New York
- Military career
- Allegiance: United States
- Branch: United States Army
- Rank: Specialist Four
- Units: 47th Infantry Regiment, 9th Infantry Division
- Conflicts: Vietnam War
- Awards: Medal of Honor

George Charles Lang (April 20, 1947 – March 16, 2005) was a United States Army soldier and a recipient of the United States military's highest decoration—the Medal of Honor—for his actions in the Vietnam War.

== Biography ==
Lang joined the Army from Brooklyn, New York, and by February 22, 1969, was serving as a Specialist Fourth Class in Company A, 4th Battalion, 47th Infantry Regiment, 9th Infantry Division. During a firefight on that day, in Kiến Hòa Province, Republic of Vietnam, Lang single-handedly assaulted three enemy emplacements before being seriously wounded. He recovered from his wounds and was awarded the Medal of Honor for his actions during the battle.

Lang died of cancer at age 57 and was buried in the Cemetery of the Holy Rood, Westbury, New York.

== Medal of Honor citation ==
Specialist Lang's official Medal of Honor citation reads:

For conspicuous gallantry and intrepidity in action at the risk of his life above and beyond the call of duty. Sp4 Lang, Company A, was serving as a squad leader when his unit, on a reconnaissance-in-force mission, encountered intense fire from a well fortified enemy bunker complex. Sp4 Lang observed an emplacement from which heavy fire was coming. Unhesitatingly, he assaulted the position and destroyed it with hand grenades and rifle fire. Observing another emplacement approximately 15 meters to his front, Sp4 Lang jumped across a canal, moved through heavy enemy fire to within a few feet of the position, and eliminated it, again using hand grenades and rifle fire. Nearby, he discovered a large cache of enemy ammunition. As he maneuvered his squad forward to secure the cache, they came under fire from yet a third bunker. Sp4 Lang immediately reacted, assaulted his position, and destroyed it with the remainder of his grenades. After returning to the area of the arms cache, his squad again came under heavy enemy rocket and automatic weapons fire from 3 sides and suffered 6 casualties. Sp4 Lang was 1 of those seriously wounded. Although immobilized and in great pain, he continued to direct his men until his evacuation was ordered over his protests. The sustained extraordinary courage and selflessness exhibited by this soldier over an extended period of time were an inspiration to his comrades and are in keeping with the highest traditions of the U.S. Army.

== See also ==
- List of Medal of Honor recipients for the Vietnam War
