= William B. Fulton (U.S. Army) =

William Bennison Fulton
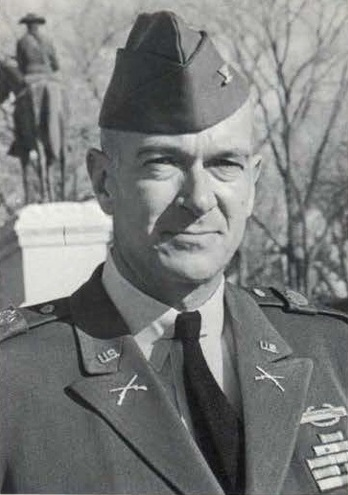
- Fulton as a colonel commanding 2nd Brigade, 9th Infantry Division in 1966
- Born: 31 October 1919; Berkeley, California
- Died: 20 January 2006 (aged 86); Arlington, Virginia
- Burial place: Mountain View Cemetery, Pocatello, Idaho
- Military career
- Allegiance: United States of America
- Branch: United States Army
- Service years: 1942–1977
- Rank: Lieutenant general
- Commands: United States Army Recruiting Command; 9th Infantry Division
- Conflicts: World War II; Korean War; Vietnam War
- Awards: Distinguished Service Cross; Distinguished Service Medal (2); Legion of Merit (3); Silver Star; Bronze Star; Purple Heart; Air Medal (14)

Lieutenant General William Bennison Fulton (31 October 1919 – 20 January 2006) was a United States Army officer who served in World War II, the Korean War and the Vietnam War.

== Early life ==
He was born in Berkeley, California on 31 October 1919 and graduated from the University of California in 1942.

== Career ==
He received his commission as a Second Lieutenant in 1942 and was assigned to an infantry replacement center in Oregon. He served in the 91st Infantry Division in the North African campaign. On 17 September 1944 as a Captain commanding a company of the 363rd Infantry Regiment during the Italian campaign, he led his unit in capturing German positions on the Monticelli Ridge of the Gothic Line for which he was awarded the Distinguished Service Cross.

After attending the Army Command and General Staff College at Fort Leavenworth, Kansas, he returned to Europe in 1946, where he served three years. He later taught at the Army Infantry School at Fort Benning, Georgia.

During the Korean War, he was on the planning staff, and later general staff, with Headquarters, Army Forces Far East Advanced, before joining the 4th Infantry Division as a battalion commander. He then served at Fort Lewis, Washington and at the special weapons directorate at The Pentagon. He was a faculty member at the Army War College in Carlisle, Pennsylvania for three years and studied at George Washington University earning a master's degree in international affairs in 1960.

He joined the 9th Infantry Division at Fort Riley and was appointed commander of the 2nd Brigade. The 9th Division was scheduled to be deployed to the Mekong Delta in South Vietnam. In July 1966 the plans and requirement for the Army's Mobile Afloat Force was sent to the 9th Division and was read by Fulton. In mid-September Fulton attended meetings at Coronado Naval Base to develop the training and doctrine of the Mobile Afloat Force. In October he accompanied the 9th Division commander General Eckhardt on an orientation tour to South Vietnam visiting the Đồng Tâm Base Camp which was then under construction. In January 1967 the 2nd Brigade command group attended a 10-day riverine course at Coronado and then flew into Bien Hoa Air Base on 15 January 1967 and then moved to Bearcat Base. The 2nd Brigade was formed into the Mobile Riverine Force with the United States Navy’s Task Force 117. In September 1967 he was promoted to brigadier general and became assistant division commander of the 9th Division. For his action in command of the 2nd Brigade, he was awarded the Distinguished Service Medal and the Silver Star. He would later author the Army study Riverine Operations, 1966-1969.

In 1970 he served as Director of Doctrine Evaluation and Command Systems in the Office of the Assistant Chief of Staff for Force Development and was also the Systems Manager for Surveillance, Target Acquisition and Night Observation (STANO) systems at the Pentagon. From 1972 to 1974, he was commanding general of the 9th Infantry Division at Fort Lewis and later served as commanding general of the U.S. Army Recruiting Command at Fort Sheridan, Illinois. While at Fort Sheridan he oversaw the Army's Project AHEAD, Army Help for Education And Development.

In 1975, he became director of the Army staff at the Pentagon on 1 September 1975 and was promoted to Lieutenant General. He served in that role until his retirement on 31 March 1977.

== Decorations ==
His decorations included the Distinguished Service Cross, Distinguished Service Medal (2), Silver Star, Legion of Merit (3), Bronze Star, Purple Heart and the Air Medal (14).
