= Đồng Tâm Base Camp =

Former U.S. military airfield in southern Vietnam

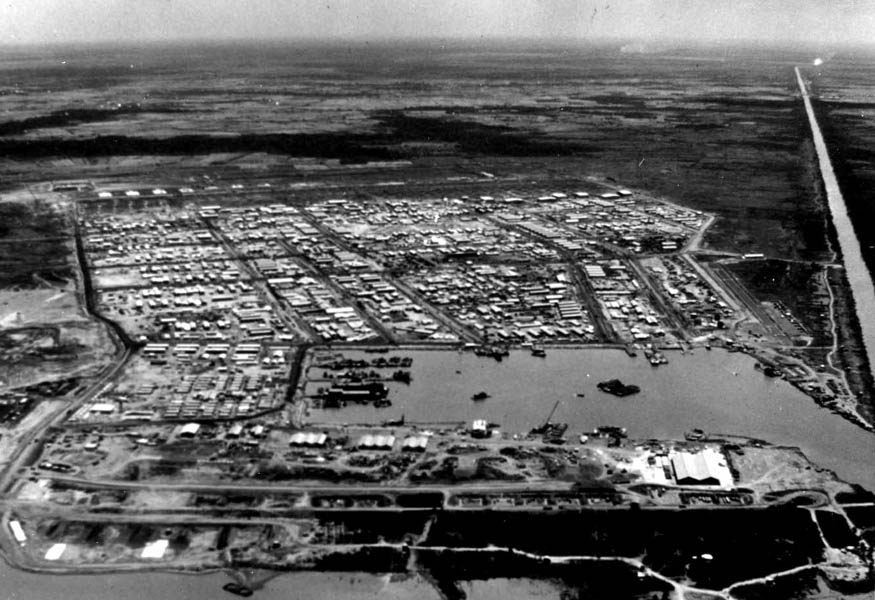

Site information
- Type: Army/Navy Base
- Condition: abandoned

Location
- Coordinates: 10.35°N 106.29°E

Site history
- Built: 1966
- In use: 1966–75
- Battles/wars: Vietnam War

Garrison information
- Occupants: 9th Infantry Division; ARVN 7th Division

Đồng Tâm Army Airfield
- IATA: none; ICAO: none

Summary
- Elevation AMSL: 5 ft (1.5 m)
- Interactive map of Đồng Tâm Army Airfield

Runways
Direction	Length		Surface
Direction	ft	m	Surface
	2,300	701	asphalt

Đồng Tâm Base Camp (also known as Đồng Tâm Army Airfield) is a former U.S. Army, U.S. Navy, and Army of the Republic of Vietnam (ARVN) base west of Mỹ Tho in the Mekong Delta, southern Vietnam.

== History ==
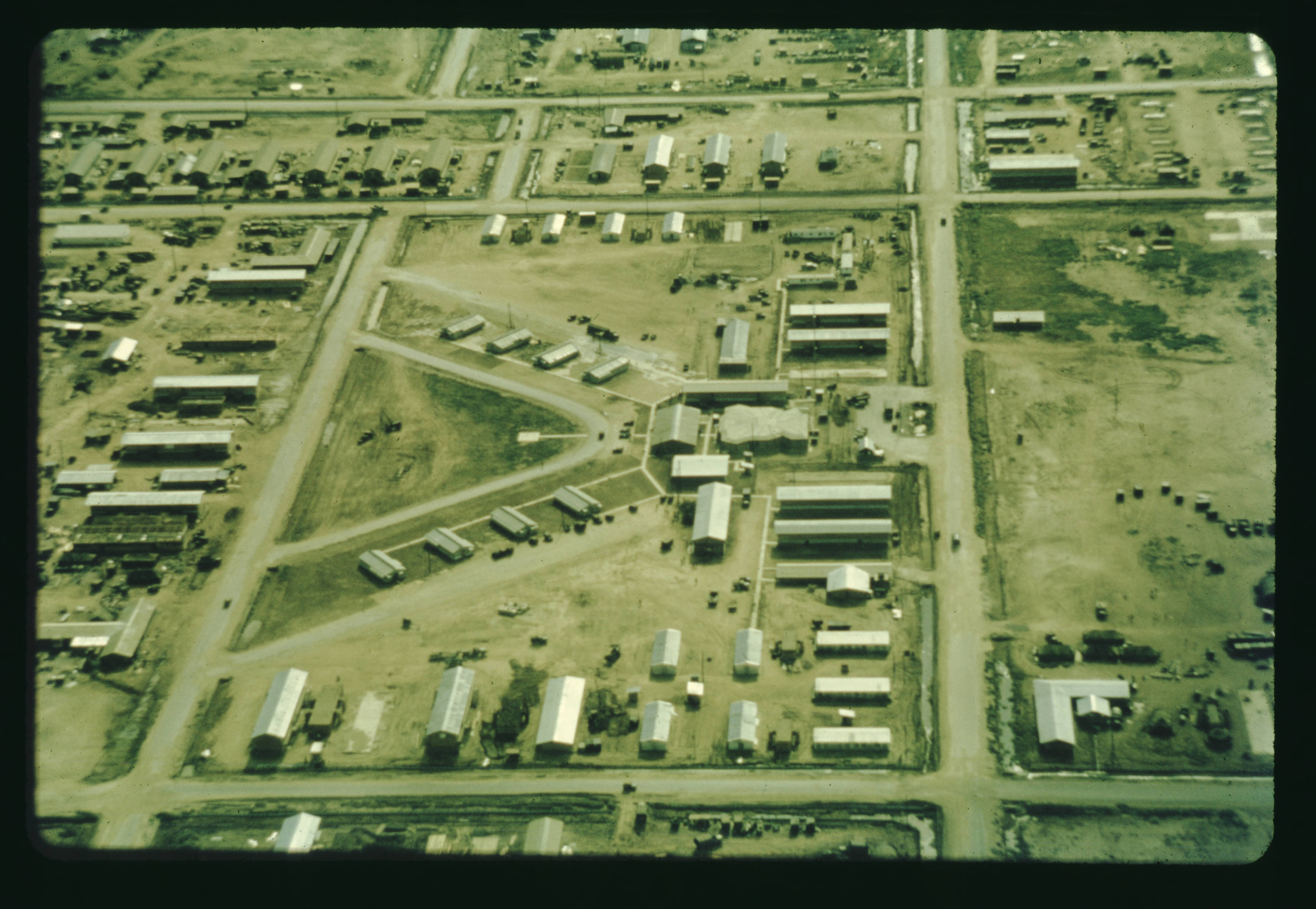
9th Infantry Division HQ, Dong Tam, 28 July 1968

=== 1966–9 ===
Đồng Tâm Base Camp was established on the northern bank of the Mekong River 7 km west of Mỹ Tho upon COMUSMACV General William Westmoreland's decision to gain full control over the upper Mekong Delta region. Westmoreland personally took part in site selection. Westmoreland chose the name Đồng Tâm meaning "united hearts and minds" or "singleness of mind, in thoughts, and actions" in Vietnamese. The total construction price for the Army and Navy ran close to $8,000,000.

Due to lack of available dry land, the base was created by dredging from the river. Dredging work to create the base commenced in August 1966 and involved the reclamation of 600 acres of swampland. The Vietcong attempted to sabotage the base construction sinking the dredgeship Jamaica Bay on 9 January 1967 with the loss of three crewmembers. In January 1967 the 3rd Battalion, 60th Infantry was deployed to Đồng Tâm to provide base and construction security followed in March by Headquarters, 2nd Brigade, 9th Infantry Division which moved from Bearcat Base. In April the US Navy River Assault Squadron 9 was deployed to Đồng Tâm to support operations.

On 1 June 1967, the Mobile Riverine Force (MRF) comprising the 2nd Brigade, 9th Infantry Division and the US Navy River Assault Squadrons 9 and 11 was established at Đồng Tâm. By this time the base occupied 12 square kilometres and included a 500m runway and a loading basin for boats.

From June–December 1967 base facilities grew providing improved support and rest and recreation for the MRF. The Vietcong regularly harassed the base with mortar fire.

Other units stationed at Đồng Tâm included:

- 1st Battalion, 11th Artillery (1968 – August 1969)
- 3rd Surgical Hospital (May 1967 – September 1969)

=== 1969–75 ===
On 1 September 1969 Đồng Tâm was turned over to the ARVN 7th Division which moved its headquarters there from Mỹ Tho.

When President Dương Văn Minh announced the unconditional surrender of South Vietnam on 30 April 1975, ARVN Brigadier General Trần Văn Hai committed suicide at the base.

== Current use ==
The base was abandoned and turned over to farmland and housing while the harbour area is used for fishing and transport vessels. As of 2018 the harbor is government controlled and leases facilities for civilian marine construction purposes. Access to the area requires government approval.
