= Mobile Riverine Force =

US naval force in Vietnam

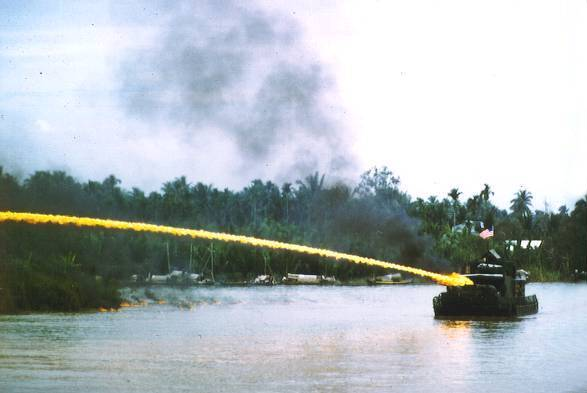
A Mobile Riverine Force monitor using napalm in the Vietnam War.

In the Vietnam War, the Mobile Riverine Force (MRF) (after May 1967), initially designated Mekong Delta Mobile Afloat Force, and later the Riverines, were a joint US Army and US Navy force that comprised a substantial part of the brown-water navy. It was modeled after lessons learned by the French experience in the First Indochina War of Dinassaut and had the task of both transport (of soldiers and equipment) and combat. The primary land base was at Đồng Tâm Base Camp, with a floating base which operated in the major rivers of the Mekong Delta. Soldiers and sailors went out in river boats from the floating base to assault the Viet Cong. During part of the 1968-69 period, there were two such mobile bases operating in different parts of the Delta, Mobile Riverine Groups Alpha and Bravo. The MRF played a key role in the Tet Offensive.

== Concept of operations ==
The Mekong Delta Mobile Afloat Force was originally conceived as providing an all weather "strike" capability in the Mekong Delta, to actively prosecute contact with Viet Cong units in the Vietnam War. A "strike" force was inherently and essentially different from the existing Navy interdiction and patrol forces (the River Patrol Boats of Operation Game Warden, and the coastal blockade of Operation Market Time). The Delta presented a classic venue appropriate to riverine operations such as had not been seen since the Union Navy in the (American Civil War) Mississippi Delta, and Sino-American operations in World War II. The Delta had a dearth of reliable roadways, all with predictable choke points at bridges, a literal myriad of creeks, streams, rivers, and canals, frequent monsoon conditions restricting air operations, and ground conditions that were often muddy.

== Historical experience ==
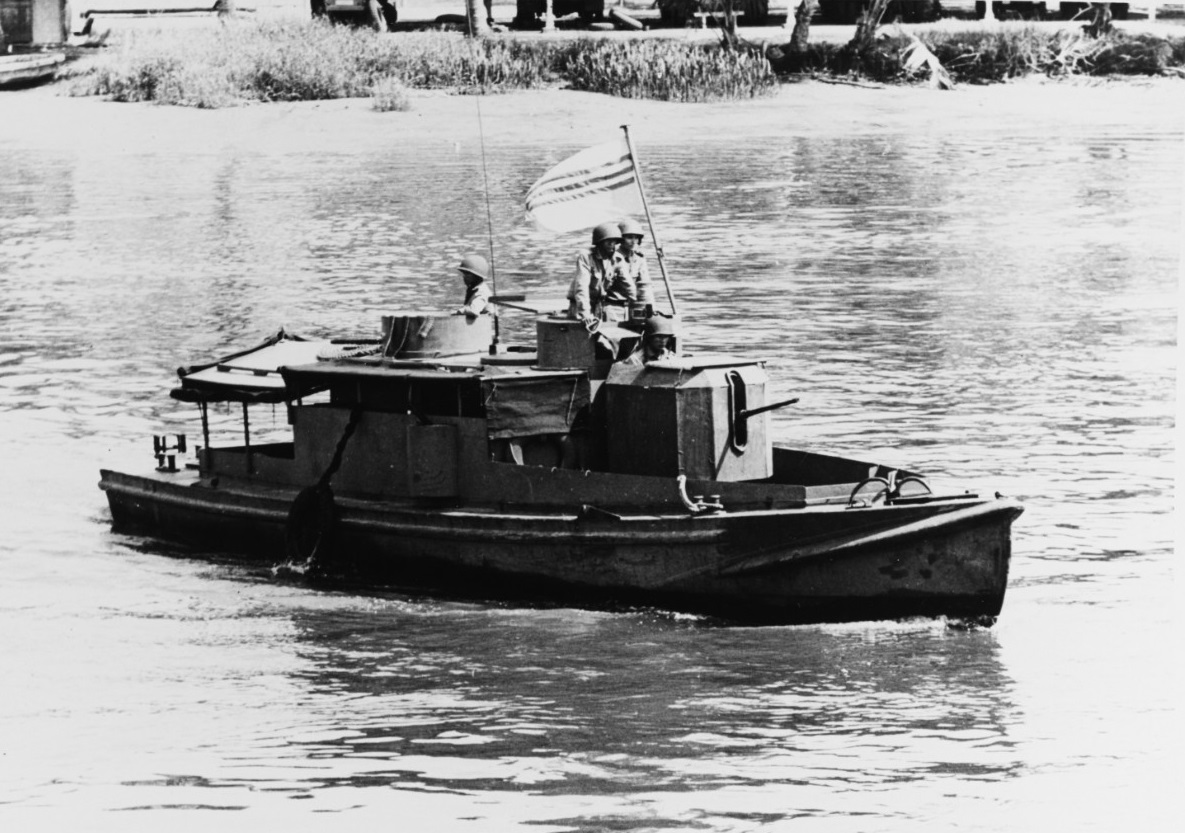
STCAN operated by the Republic of Vietnam Navy

A wide range of riverine craft were used by the allies, both before, and during the formalization of the US Navy Brown Water Navy, in 1964–1965. Foremost were the surplus World War II US naval craft; LCMs, LCVPs, LSMs, PGMs, LSSLs, etc., as well as post-war Nasty class patrol boats. One of the most popular riverine craft was the all-steel LCM converted into a naval Monitor, and was used by the French during the first Indochina war; and later by the US and South Vietnamese Navies. However, The French, during their war in Vietnam (1945–1954), had been heavily inspired by the US Navy LCVP, which they had received from the US, as part of the United States massive assistance program to fight communism. The French took the LCVP design and created an all new, and as it turned out, the only "original" or entirely new boat built for riverine warfare during the French Indochina war; the STCAN (a corruption of the acronym STCN, which stood for the French equivalent of the US Navy's BuShips, which read Service Technique de Construction Navale). The French STCAN was built of steel, approximately 40 feet (12 m) long, "V" hulled, with a shiplike bow, was armed with one .50 cal machine gun, three .30 cal machine guns, and eight crewmen.

== Creation of the Mobile Riverine Force ==
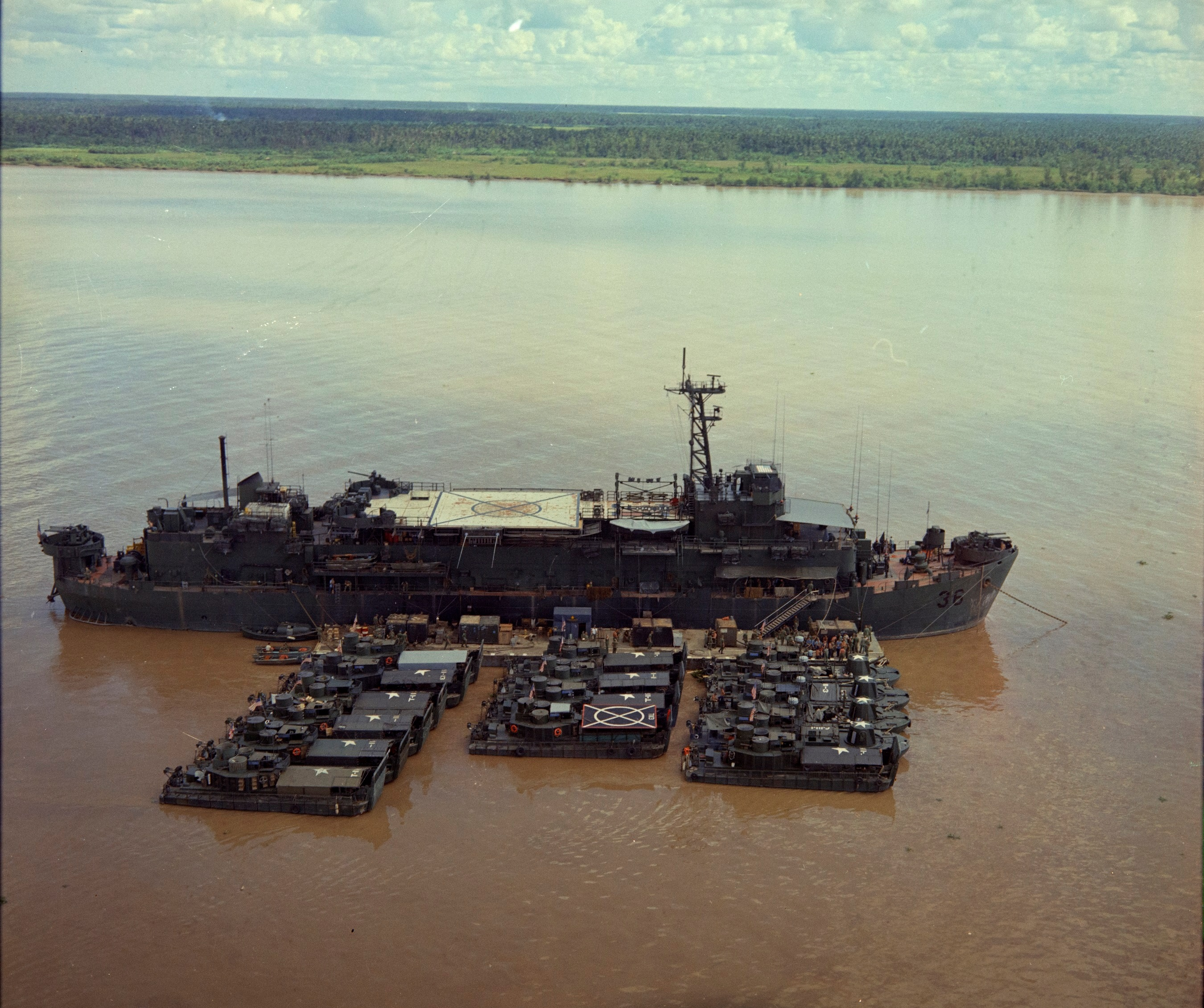
USS Benewah and MRF boats at My Tho, 1967

The Mekong Delta Mobile Riverine Force concept paired newly created assault boat units with a brigade of Army infantry. The force contained a U.S. Army reinforced brigade consisting of three infantry battalions, an artillery battalion, and other combat and combat service support.

The force would be based aboard U.S. Navy ships that would include 5 self-propelled barracks ships, 2 LSTs, 2 large harbor tugs, and 2 landing craft repair ships. In addition, two U.S. Navy river assault groups would provide tactical water mobility.

Each assault group would be capable of lifting the combat elements of one reinforced infantry battalion. A small salvage craft would be necessary to recover damaged ships or craft. The reinforced brigade would be organized under the current standard ROAD (Reorganization Objective Army Divisions) tables of organization and equipment, with limited augmentation. Certain equipment specified in the tables, such as tents, mess facilities, 106mm recoilless rifles, antitank wire-guided missiles, and all wheeled vehicles except artillery prime movers were to be deleted from the force requirements. The number of 90mm recoilless rifles in each rifle company was to be reduced from six to three to improve the mobility of the weapons squads. The 4.2-inch mortars would accompany the force and be moved by water or air to field positions as necessary. Radios would be either ship-mounted or man-portable.

Coxswains of plastic assault boats were to be designated in the proposed tables and trained upon arrival in Vietnam. Enough troops from each of the units afloat would be left at a land base to maintain equipment left in storage.

The plan provided for an augmentation of three counter-mortar radar sections, each manned by nine men, to operate and maintain ship-mounted counter-mortar radars.

A mobile Army surgical hospital team, U.S. Air Force Tactical Air Control Parties (TACPs) which included forward air controllers, Army of the Republic of Vietnam liaison troops, and additional AN/PRC-25 radios were to be furnished from sources outside the parent division of the brigade.

Each river assault group, later designated river assault squadron, was to consist of the following: 52 Armored Troop Carriers (ATCs or "Tangos"), 10 Monitors with 40mm cannon and 81mm mortar, 32 Assault Support Patrol Boats (ASPBs), 5 Monitors to serve as command and control boats and 2 LCM-6s to serve as refuelers. A salvage force would include: 2 2,000-ton heavy lift craft, 2 YTBs for salvage, 2 LCUs (Landing Craft, Utility), and 3 100-ton floating dry docks.

== Navy Assault Squadrons ==
Originally two, and ultimately four Navy Assault Squadrons were created: River Assault Squadrons 9, 11, 13 and 15. The 2nd (Riverine) Brigade of the U.S. 9th Infantry Division was assigned to work with these units. A fixed land base was created by dredging a portion of the Song Ham Luong near My Tho and was named "Đồng Tâm." This became the administrative headquarters of the MRF.

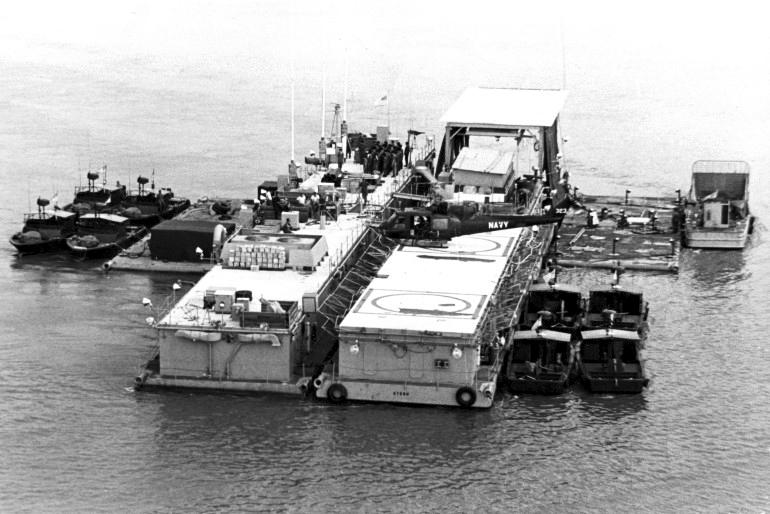
Mobile Riverine Base II with PBRs and UH-1B of HA(L)-3

Nonetheless, the Navy created a floating Mobile Riverine Base (MRB) by assigning barracks ships, and barrage barges (non-self propelled) to house both Army and Navy personnel, provide communications and staff support, mooring and support facilities on Ammi pontoons alongside, and refit, rearm and resupply stores. The MRB also included repair ships (ARLs) and supply ships (LSTs). The ships of the MRB also had helicopter landing capabilities, providing air resupply and medical air evacuation ("dust off") capability and had significant medical care facilities aboard. Thus, the entire force could move throughout the major rivers of the Delta, and launch troops, on boats, into assault operations deep into the narrowest rivulets and canals. Given the low limit speed of perhaps 6 knots (11 km/h) (or less if opposing the fierce lower Delta currents), this "MOBILE" capability made boat assault operations in the furthest reaches of the Delta feasible.

Eventually, the MRF included Army floating artillery and mortar barges, which could be moved throughout the Delta and positioned to support the planned area of each assault operation. Integral air support came from newly created Navy gunship helicopter squadron HAL 3 (Helicopter Attack, Light), the SEAWOLVES, based at Dong Tam a unit of CTF 116. This was additional to such air support, both troop insertion and gunfire ships, as the Army tasked to each operation, and air support from Air Force TAC air units on call.

== See also ==
- Dinassaut
- Khmer National Navy
- Republic of Vietnam Navy
- Royal Lao Navy
