= List of allied military operations of the Vietnam War (1968) =

This article is a list of known military operations of the Vietnam War in 1968, conducted by the armed forces of the Republic of Vietnam, the United States and their allies.

Date Duration	Operation Name	Unit(s) – Description	Location	VC–PAVN KIAs	Allied KIAs
68	Operation Keepout	USAF operation to sow anti-personnel mines	"Parrot's Beak" area Svay Rieng Province, Cambodia		
68	Operation Leap Frog	Systematic canvassing of the opinions of senior ARVN officers by U.S. military intelligence on likely Vietcong actions			
68 – 69	Operation Duck Hook	Nixon administration covert plan to coerce the North Vietnamese to make concessions at the Paris Peace Talks			
68 – 69	Operation Inferno	USAF operation to start fires by dropping bulk fuel from C-130s in concentrated areas. The operation was eventually deemed cost prohibitive			
Jan 1 – Feb 1973	Operation Igloo White	USAF electronic warfare program to interdict the Ho Chi Minh Trail	Ho Chi Minh Trail		
Jan 1 – Mar 1 1973	Operation Clearwater	US Navy operation to interdict enemy bases and lines of communications on inland waterways	I Corps		
Jan 5 – 25	Operation Sultan (1968)	Special Forces Project DELTA operation	Kon Tum Province		
Jan 5 – Apr 8	Operation Niagara	USAF bombing	around Khe Sanh Combat Base	unknown	
Jan 10 – 21	Operation Duntroon	2nd Battalion, Royal Australian Regiment, 7th Battalion, Royal Australian Regiment and 3rd Cavalry Regiment search and destroy operation in conjunction with 1st Brigade, 9th Infantry Division Operation Akron V	Phước Tuy Province		
Jan 11 – 21	Operation Akron V	1st Brigade, 9th Infantry Division search and destroy operation	Biên Hòa Province		
Jan 13 – 28	Operation Altoona	199th Infantry Brigade search and destroy operation	Biên Hòa Province		
Jan 13 – Feb 18	Operation Haverford	199th Infantry Brigade search and destroy operation	Gia Định and Long An Provinces		
Jan 14	Operation Gator	1st Battalion, 16th Infantry Regiment operation	IV Corps		
Jan 15 – Feb 9	Operation San Angelo	1st Brigade, 101st Airborne Division search and destroy operation	Quang Duc and Phước Long Provinces	63	12
Jan 18 – Feb 13	Operation Coronado X	MRF 2nd Brigade, 9th Infantry Division and US Navy Task Force 117 search and destroy operation	Ba Xuyen, Dinh Tuong, Kien Hoa, Phuoc Dinh and Vĩnh Long Provinces	344	
Jan 23 – 26	Operation Badger Catch	Operation Napoleon/Saline BLT 3rd Battalion, 1st Marines and HMM-165 search and destroy operation to clear the north and south banks of the Cua Viet River and prevent enemy interdiction of river traffic	Quảng Trị Province	10	12
Jan 20 – 27	Operation Atalla/Casey	1st Infantry Division, 2nd Brigade, 101st Airborne Division and 11th Armored Cavalry Regiment search and destroy operation	Bình Long Province		
Jan 20 – 31	Operation McLain	173rd Airborne Brigade, 3rd Brigade, 506th Airborne Infantry Regiment and 3rd Battalion, 69th Armor Regiment reconnaissance in force operation as continuation of Operation Byrd	Bình Thuận Province	1,042	
Jan 21 – 24	Operation Neosho II	2nd Battalion, 4th Marines and 1st Battalion, 9th Marines clearing operation to provide cover for the 1st Cavalry Division's arrival at Camp Evans	24 km northwest of Huế	1	
Jan 21 – Feb 16	Operation Osceola II	1st Battalion, 1st Marines and 1st Battalion, 3rd Marines search and destroy operation	Quảng Trị Province	24	2
Jan 21 – Nov 23	Operation Lancaster II	1st Battalion, 1st Marines, 1st Battalion, 3rd Marines, 2nd Battalion, 3rd Marines, 3rd Battalion, 3rd Marines, 1st Battalion, 4th Marines, 2nd Battalion, 4th Marines, 3rd Battalion, 4th Marines, 1st Battalion, 9th Marines, 2nd Battalion, 9th Marines, 3rd Battalion, 9th Marines and 2nd Battalion, 26th Marines search-and-clear operation to safeguard Route 9	between Cam Lo and Ca Lu	1801	359
Jan 22 – Feb 29	Operation Pershing II	2/1 Cavalry and 4th Infantry Division operation	Bình Định and Quảng Ngãi Provinces	614	156
Jan 22 – Mar 31	Operation Jeb Stuart I	1st Cavalry Division and 1st and 2nd Brigades, 101st Airborne Division operation	Quảng Trị Province	3,268	294
Jan 24 – Mar 1	Operation Coburg	2nd Battalion, Royal Australian Regiment, 3rd Battalion, Royal Australian Regiment and 7th Battalion, Royal Australian Regiment reconnaissance in force operation, which incidentally placed it in excellent response positions to several Tet Offensive trouble spots	Biên Hòa and Phước Tuy Provinces		
Jan 26 – Feb 29	Operation Saline	3rd Battalion, 1st Marines and 1st Amphibian Tractor Battalion search and destroy operation to keep the Cua Viet River supply line open. Combined with Operation Napoleon on 28 Feb 68	Cua Viet River		
Jan 31 – Mar 8	Operation Adairsville	11th Armored Cavalry Regiment operation to defend Long Binh	Biên Hòa Province		
Feb 1 – Mar 2	Operation Hue City	1st Marines and 5th Marines operation to drive PAVN/VC out of Huế (Battle of Huế) during Tet Offensive	Huế	5,113	668
Feb 1 – Mar 10	Operation Lam Son 68	2nd Brigade, 1st Infantry Division and ARVN 5th Division and 18th Division search and destroy operation	Biên Hòa and Bình Dương Provinces		
Feb 5 – 17	Operation Tran Hung Dao I	ARVN 1st, 3rd, 6th, 8th and 11th Airborne Brigades, VNMC 1st, 2nd, 3rd, 4th & 6th Brigades, 30th, 33rd, 35th, 38th & 41st Ranger Battalions, 3rd Battalion, 7th Infantry Regiment and 199th Infantry Brigade operation to defend the Saigon area during the Tet Offensive	Saigon	953	
Feb 10 – Mar 22	Operation Uniontown III	199th Light Infantry Brigade and 11th Armored Cavalry Regiment security operations	Long Binh	40	
Feb 13 – Mar 4	Operation Coronado XI	MRF 9th Infantry Division, 9th ARVN Division, ARVN 21st Division joint riverine, air and ground search operations to locate and destroy Vietcong MR 3 headquarters and to cordon and search Cu Lao May island in the Hậu River southwest of Cần Thơ. The operation was also to relieve enemy pressure on the city of Cần Thơ	Cai Rang and Phung Hiep Districts, Phong Binh Province		
Feb 15	Operation Oakleigh	2nd Battalion, Royal Australian Regiment and 7th Battalion, Royal Australian Regiment cordon and search operation	Hoa Long, Long Hải	9	
Feb 16 – Mar 1	Operation Mang Ho X	ROK Capital Division search and destroy operation	Bình Định Province	664	
Feb 17 – Mar 28	Operation Tran Hung Dao II	Continuation of Operation Tran Hung Dao I in the Saigon area with slightly reduced forces	Saigon	713	
Feb 18 – 19	Operation Dandenong	7th Battalion, Royal Australian Regiment cordon-and-search operation	Ap Soui Nghe		
Feb 20 – 21	Operation Clayton	2nd Battalion, Royal Australian Regiment and 7th Battalion, Royal Australian Regiment cordon-and search operation with support elements and South Vietnamese police and interpreters	Long Dien		
Feb 26 – Mar 3	Operation Tampa	1st Battalion, 7th Marines, 3rd Battalion, 7th Marines and 3rd Squadron, 5th Cavalry Regiment search and destroy operation	Quảng Nam Province		
Feb 26 – Sep 12	Operation Houston	5th Marine Regiment, 2nd Battalion, 3rd Marines, 1st Battalion, 327th Airborne Infantry, 2nd Battalion, 502nd Airborne Infantry, 1st Battalion, 26th Marines and 3rd Battalion, 26th Marines operation to reopen and secure Route 1, between Da Nang and Phu Bai	Thừa Thiên Province	702	117
Feb 27 – mid Apr	Operation Pinnaroo	2nd Battalion, Royal Australian Regiment and 3rd Battalion, Royal Australian Regiment operation to cordon off the entire Long Hải hills area to stop a number of VC groups trying to escape through the cordon; Australians' first successful foray into the traditional VC stronghold of the Minh Dam Secret Zone	Phước Tuy Province	21	
Feb 29 – Mar 1	Operation Reaction	1st Battalion, 20th Infantry Regiment search and destroy operation			
Feb 29 – Oct 31	Operation Napoleon/Saline	2nd Battalion, 1st Marines, 3rd Battalion, 1st Marines, 1st Battalion, 3rd Marines, 2nd Battalion, 3rd Marines, 3rd Battalion, 3rd Marines, 1st Battalion, 4th Marines, 2nd Battalion, 4th Marines, 1st Battalion, 9th Marines, 2nd Battalion, 9th Marines, 2nd Battalion, 26th Marines and 2/1 Cavalry operation	along Cua Viet River, Quảng Trị Province	3495	353
Mar 1 – 31	Operation Patrick	3rd Brigade 4th Infantry Division search and destroy and cordon and search operation	Bình Định Province		
Mar 1 – May 21	Operation Truong Cong Dinh	ARVN 7th Division and 9th Division and 1st and 2nd Brigades, 9th Infantry Division search and destroy operations	Dinh Tuong, Kien Hoa, Kien Tuong, Vĩnh Bình and Bình Long Provinces	1546	
Mar 3 – 7	Operation Mingo	1st Battalion, 1st Marines and 2nd Battalion 327th Infantry Regiment search and destroy operation along Route 527 towards the A Shau Valley	Quảng Trị Province	5	
Mar 4 – 6	Operation Coronado XII	MRF 9th Infantry Division, ARVN 9th Division, ARVN 21st Division search and destroy operation	Ba Xuyen and Phong Binh Provinces		
Mar 5 – 13	Operation Show Low	4th Battalion, 3rd Infantry Regiment and ARVN 2nd Division search and destroy operation	Quảng Ngãi Province		
Mar 6 – 10	Operation Rock	3rd Battalion, 7th Marines sweep on the peninsula formed by the Vu Gia and Thu Bồn Rivers, the so-called "Arizona Territory",	6 km northwest of An Hoa	35	3
Mar 7	Operation Harrisburg	199th Infantry Brigade, 3rd Brigade, 101st Airborne Division and 11th Armored Cavalry Regiment security operation	Biên Hòa Province		
Mar 7 – 16	Operation Valley Forge	199th Infantry Brigade, 3rd Brigade, 101st Airborne Division and 2nd Squadron, 11th Armored Cavalry Regiment search and destroy operation	Biên Hòa and Long Khánh Provinces		
Mar 8 – 31	Operation Carentan	1st and 3rd Brigades, 101st Airborne Division and ARVN 1st Division search and destroy, cordon and search, reconnaissance in force operation	lowlands of Quảng Trị and Thừa Thiên Provinces		
Mar 8 – Apr 7	Operation Wilderness	1st Brigade, 25th Infantry Division and 199th Infantry Brigade search and destroy operation	Tây Ninh Province		
Mar 11 – Apr 7	Operation Quyet Thang/Operation Resolve to Win	1st Infantry Division, 9th Infantry Division and 25th Infantry Division; ARVN 5th Division, 25th Division, Airborne Battalions, and Marines post-Tet Offensive clearing operation to mop up VC	Saigon area and 5 surrounding provinces	2658	79 US
Mar 12 – 26	Operation Worth	1st Battalion, 7th Marines, 2nd Battalion, 7th Marines and 3rd Squadron, 5th Cavalry Regiment search and destroy operation	24 km northwest of Da Nang, Quảng Nam Province	160	27
Mar 14 – 20	Operation Ford	2nd Battalion, 3rd Marines and 1st Battalion, 1st Marines sweep of the Phu Thu Peninsula to engage the VC 804th Main Force Battalion	east of Phu Bai	145	14
Mar 14 – 20	Operation Lam Son 194	ARVN 1st Division operation tying in with Operation Ford	east of Phu Bai		
Mar 16 – 17	Operation San Francisco	3rd Brigade, 1st Infantry Division search and destroy operation	III Corps		
Mar 16 – 28	Operation Box Springs	3rd Brigade, 101st Airborne Division and 173rd Airborne Brigade search and destroy operation	Bình Dương Province		
Mar 17 – Jan 31 1969	Operation Walker	3rd Battalion, 503rd Infantry Regiment 173rd Airborne Brigade and 1st Battalion, 69th Armor Regiment search and destroy and security operation	vicinity of An Khê, Pleiku Province		
Mar 17 – Jul 30	Operation Duong Cua Dan/Operation People's Road	9th Infantry Division security operation for repair of Route 4	between Cat Lay and Mỹ Tho	1357	93
Mar 21 – Apr 6	Operation Alcorn Grove	11th Armored Cavalry Regiment operation	Long Khánh Province		
Mar 23 – Apr 7	Operation Los Banos	3rd Brigade, 101st Airborne Division security operation	Biên Hòa Province		
Mar 25 – May 29	Operation Ashgrove Tram	2nd Battalion, Royal Australian Regiment/RNZIR (ANZAC) cordon-and-search operation	Long Hải village		
Mar 28 – 29	Operation Woolgoogla	7th Battalion, Royal Australian Regiment final operation as a company search in the Cay Den jungle	1 km southeast of Hoa Long	8	
Mar 30 – Jan 31 1969	Operation Cochise Green/Dan Sinh	173rd Airborne Brigade and 4th Infantry Division reconnaissance in force and pacification operation	Bình Định and Quảng Ngãi Provinces	929	114
Apr – Oct	Operation Duck Blind	Interim code name for Operation Igloo White			
Apr 1 – 15	Operation Pegasus/Operation Lam Son 207	1st Cavalry Division, 1st Battalion, 1st Marines, 2nd Battalion, 1st Marines, 2nd Battalion, 3rd Marines, 1st Battalion, 9th Marines 1st, 2nd and 3rd battalions, 26th Marines and ARVN 2nd Division resupply and relief operations along Route 9 to U.S. Marines besieged at Khe Sanh Combat Base	Quảng Trị Province	1100+ (est)	144
Apr 1 – 24	Operation Cooktown Orchid	2nd Battalion, Royal Australian Regiment security operation	area surrounding the Long Hải hills complex to the east of Đất Đỏ		
Apr 1 – May 17	Operation Carentan II	101st Airborne Division and 3rd Brigade 82nd Airborne Division operation	lowlands of Quảng Trị and Thừa Thiên Provinces	2,100	195
Apr 3 – 7	Operation Atlas I	1st Infantry Division security operation	Bình Dương Province		
Apr 3 – 7	Operation Carlisle	1st Infantry Division security operation	Phước Long Province		
Apr 3 – 7	Operation Waterford	1st Infantry Division security operation	Bình Long Province	13	
Apr 8 – 19	Operation Norfolk Victory	1st Battalion, 20th Infantry Regiment clear and search operation	Nghĩa Hành District, Quảng Ngãi Province	43	5
Apr 8 – May 31	Operation Toan Thang I	Allied reaction to the Tet Offensive, first of a series of massive operations combining the assets and operations of the ARVN's III Corps and the American II Field Force to maintain the post-Tet pressure on the enemy and to drive all remaining PAVN/VC troops from III Corps and the Saigon area. 3rd Brigade, 9th Infantry Division), 1st Infantry Division, 25th Infantry Division, 199th Infantry Brigade, 11th Armored Cavalry Regiment and 1st Battalion, Royal Australian Regiment participated		7,645	440
Apr 8 – Nov 11	Operation Burlington Trail	198th Infantry Brigade operation	border of Quảng Tín Province and Quảng Nam Provinces	1,931	212
Apr 10 – 14	Operation Jasper Square	3rd Battalion, 7th Marines operation	Go Noi, Quảng Nam Province	54	6
Apr 12 – 16	Operation Charlton	3rd Battalion, 1st Marines operation	Ba Long valley south of Cam Lo		
Apr 13	Operation No-Name 2	1st Battalion, 27th Marines operation	east of Huế	60	24
Apr 14 – 28	Operation Velvet Hammer	173rd Airborne Brigade cordon and search operation	Bình Định Province		
Apr 15 – 26	Operation Clifton Coral	11th Armored Cavalry Regiment reconnaissance in force	Bình Phước Province		
Apr 15 – Feb 28 1969	Operation Scotland II	1st Battalion, 1st Marines, 2nd Battalion, 1st Marines, 1st Battalion, 3rd Marines, 2nd Battalion, 3rd Marines, 3rd Battalion, 3rd Marines, 1st Battalion, 4th Marines, 2nd Battalion, 4th Marines, 3rd Battalion, 4th Marines, 1st Battalion, 9th Marines, 2nd Battalion, 9th Marines, 3rd Battalion, 9th Marines and 1st, 2nd and 3rd Battalions, 26th Marines continuing operations around Khe Sanh plateau upon termination of Operation Pegasus	Khe Sanh plateau	3,304	435
Apr 18 – May 17	Operation Rice	1st and 3rd Battalion 26th Marines and 3rd Squadron, 5th Cavalry Regiment operation	Quảng Trị and Thừa Thiên Provinces		21
Apr 19 – 26	Operation Baxter Garden/Lam Son 214	2nd Battalion, 5th Marines and 1st Tank Battalion rice denial operation	8 km east of Huế	55	13
Apr 19 – May 17	Operation Delaware	1st Marine Division, 1st Cavalry Division, 101st Airborne Division, 3rd Brigade 82nd Airborne Division and 196th Infantry Brigade, operation	A Shau Valley, Thừa Thiên Province	869	45
Apr 19 – May 17	Operation Lam Son 216	ARVN 1st Division and 3rd ARVN Airborne Task Force operation in conjunction with Operation Delaware	A Shau Valley		
Apr 30 – May 3	Operation Dai Do	US Navy River Assault Group, Battalion Landing Team 2nd Battalion, 4th Marines, B Company, 1st Battalion, 3rd Marines, 1st Battalion, 3rd Marines and 3rd Battalion, 21st Infantry Regiment operation against the 48th and 52nd Regiments of the PAVN 320th Division to eliminate the threat to the junction of the Bo Dieu and Cua Viet Rivers	Quảng Trị Province	1568	110
May 1 – Nov 20	Operation Kudzu	9th Infantry Division reconnaissance and security operation of Đồng Tâm Base Camp	Dinh Truong Province		
May 4 – Aug 24	Operation Allen Brook	1st Battalion, 7th Marines, 2nd Battalion, 7th Marines, 3rd Battalion, 7th Marines, 3rd Battalion, 5th Marines, 1st Battalion, 26th Marines, 1st, 2nd & 3rd Battalions, 27th Marines and 2nd Battalion, 13th Marines operation	Go Noi Island, southern Quảng Nam Province	1,017	240
May 9 – 16	Operation Concordia Square/Lam Son 224	2/1 Cavalry operation	Quảng Trị Province	349	19
May 10 – 12	Operation Golden Valley	2nd Battalion, 196th Infantry Brigade, Company A, 1st Battalion, 46th Infantry Regiment and Battery A, 3rd Battalion, 82nd Artillery Regiment relief and reinforcement of Kham Duc Special Forces Camp	Quảng Tín Province		
May 17 – Nov 3	Operation Jeb Stuart III	1st Cavalry Division operations	border of Quảng Trị and central Thừa Thiên Provinces	2114	212
May 17 – Feb 28 1969	Operation Nevada Eagle	101st Airborne Division, 1st Cavalry Division and 3rd Brigade, 82nd Airborne Division clear and search operation as follow-up to Operation Delaware	central Thừa Thiên Province	3,299	353
May 19 – Oct 23	Operation Mameluke Thrust	1st Battalion 7th Marines, 3rd Battalion 26th Marines, 1st Battalion 26th Marines, 3rd Battalion 5th Marines, A Troop, 1st Squadron, 9th Cavalry, 3rd Battalion 7th Marines and 2nd Battalion 7th Marines clear and search operations	central Quảng Nam Province	2728	269
May 21 – Aug 3	Operation Truong Cong Dinh	9th Infantry Division reconnaissance in force operation, superseded by Operation Quyet Chin	Dinh Tuong Province	1546	
May 24 – Jun 12	Operation Mathews	1st Brigade, 4th Infantry Division and 3rd Brigade, 101st Airborne Division search and destroy operation	Kon Tum Province	352	69
Jun	Operation Duel Blade	Interim code name for Operation Igloo White			
Jun 1 – Feb 16 1969	Operation Toan Thang II	1st Infantry Division, 1st Cavalry Division, 9th Infantry Division, 199th Infantry Brigade, 1st Battalion, Royal Australian Regiment, 3rd Battalion, Royal Australian Regiment and 4th Battalion, Royal Australian Regiment/Royal New Zealand Infantry Regiment (ANZAC) and ARVN operations for static defense of designated tactical areas of responsibility as well as limited reconnaissance operations to prevent PAVN rocket fire on Saigon	Saigon and surrounding provinces	25,428	1,798
Jun 2 – 19	Operation Robin	Task Force Hotel (consisting of 1st Battalion, 1st Marines, 2nd Battalion, 3rd Marines, 1st Battalion, 4th Marines, 2nd Battalion, 4th Marines, 3rd Battalion, 4th Marines and 3rd Battalion, 9th Marines) search and destroy operation using airmobile tactics to prevent an attack on Khe Sanh and northern Quảng Trị Province	Quảng Trị Province	635	65+
Jun 7 - 14	Operation Swift Saber	BLT 3rd Battalion, 1st Marines clear and search operation	Elephant Valley, 16 km north of Da Nang, Quảng Nam Province		
Jun 7 – 18	Operation Banjo Royce/Quang Trung 23/4	1st Brigade, 101st Airborne Division reconnaissance in force operation	Lâm Đồng and Tuyen Duc Provinces		
Jun 15 – 20	Operation Kosciusko	4th Battalion, Royal Australian Regiment/Royal New Zealand Infantry Regiment (ANZAC) reconnaissance in force operation	between Nui Thia Vai mountain and Nui Dinh mountain	2	
Jun 18 – Jul 1	Operation Harmon Green	1st and 3rd Battalions, 503rd Airborne Infantry Regiment reconnaissance in force operation	Binh Tuy, Lâm Đồng and Tuyen Duc Provinces		
Jun 19 – 29	Operation Norfolk Victory II	3rd Battalion, 1st Infantry Regiment and ARVN 2nd Division clear and search operation	Quảng Ngãi Province		
Jun 19 – 29	Operation Norwalk	1st Infantry Division security operation			
Jun 20 – 30	Operation Chattachoochee Swamp/Lien Ket 45	3rd Battalion, 11th Infantry Brigade and ARVN 2nd Division clear and search operation	Song Tea Khuc and Song Tam Rao valleys, Quảng Ngãi Province		
Jun 20 – Jul 2	Operation Vance Canyon	198th Infantry Brigade clear and search operation	Quảng Ngãi Province		
Jun 26 – 27	Operation Charger	1st Battalion, 12th Cavalry Regiment and ARVN 1st Regiment search and destroy operation	Quảng Trị Province		
Jul 1 – 7	Operation Thor	Combined arms bombardment	eastern DMZ	125	
Jul 5 – Aug 3	Operation Pocahontas Forest	196th Infantry Brigade, 5th Battalion, 46th Infantry Regiment, 1st Battalion, 26th Marines and ARVN 5th Regiment clear and search operation	Hiệp Đức Valley in Quảng Nam and Quảng Trị Provinces		
Jul 17 – Mar 4 1969	Operation Quyet Chien	ARVN 7th Division, 9th Division, 21st Division and US 9th Infantry Division operation	U Minh Forest, Kiên Giang Province	2,248	131
Jul 18 – 24	Operation Merino	3rd Battalion, Royal Australian Regiment reconnaissance in force operation	Biên Hòa Province		
Jul 20	Operation Cleansweep	4th Infantry Division operation	Pleiku Province		
Jul 23 – 30	Operation Swift Play	BLT 2nd Battalion, 7th Marines clear and search operation	Quảng Nam Province		
Jul 29 – Aug 13	Operation Platypus	1st Battalion, Royal Australian Regiment and 3rd Battalion, Royal Australian Regiment reconnaissance in force	Hat Dich area, Phước Tuy Province		
Aug 1 – 31	Operation Lyre Bird	4th Battalion, Royal Australian Regiment/Royal New Zealand Infantry Regiment (ANZAC) land-clearing operation	west of Nui Dat, Phước Tuy Province		
Aug 2 – Apr 24 1969	Operation Lam Son 245	ARVN 54th Regiment operation	Thừa Thiên Province	636	
Aug 4 – 20	Operation Somerset Plain/Operation Lam Son 246	101st Airborne Division, 1st Cavalry Division and ARVN 1st Regiment search and destroy operation	A Shau Valley, Thừa Thiên Province		
Aug 8 – Sep 6	Operation Nowra	1st Battalion, Royal Australian Regiment defence of Bà Rịa and Long Điền District	Phước Tuy Province		
Aug 12 – 16	Operation Dodge Valley	Elements of the 1st Marines, 7th Marines and 27th Marines clear and search operation	Quảng Nam Province		
Aug 22 – Dec 12	Operation Dan Sinh 22-6	173rd Airborne Brigade and ARVN 22nd Division reconnaissance in force	Bong Son Plains, Bình Định Province		
Aug 23 – 31	Operation Duc Lap	ARVN 23rd Division, 2nd and 5th Mobile Strike Force defence of Duc Lap CIDG base	Quang Duc Province		
Aug 24 – Sep 9	Operation Tien Ho	ARVN 23rd Division operation	Quang Duc Province	1091	
Aug 28 – 31	Operation Cranberry Bog	One of the first Joint Personnel Recovery Center operations as part of Operation Black Knight to rescue POW, 1LT James N. Rowe	Chuong Thien Province	2	
Aug 28 – Sep 5	Operation Diamantina	3rd Battalion, Royal Australian Regiment reconnaissance in force	north of Nui Dat, Phước Tuy Province		
Aug 29 – Sep 9	Operation Sussex Bay	2nd Battalion, 5th Marines, 3rd Battalion, 5th Marines and 3rd Battalion, 7th Marines clear and search operation	Quảng Nam Province		
Sep	Operation Homestead	MRF 9th Infantry Division search and destroy operation	Kien Hoa Province		
Sep 1 – 9	Operation Alice	196th Infantry Brigade security operation	Tây Ninh Province		
Sep 3 – 24	Operation Champaign Grove	23rd Infantry Division operation	Quảng Ngãi Province	378	15
Sep 7 – 12	Operation Innamincka	4th Battalion, Royal Australian Regiment/Royal New Zealand Infantry Regiment (ANZAC) and 104th Field Battery cordon and search and reconnaissance in force operation	Phước Tuy Province		
Sep 10 – 20	Operation Vinh Loc	2nd Brigade, 101st Airborne Division and ARVN 54th Regiment pacification operation	Vinh Loc Island, Thừa Thiên Province		
Sep 10 – Oct 3	Operation Commanche Falls I	1st Cavalry Division and ARVN 1st Division clear and search operation	Quảng Trị and Thừa Thiên Provinces		
Sep 11 – 25	Operation Eagle II/Operation Toan Thang 9-68	ARVN 2nd, 5th, 6th and 9th Airborne Battalions and 2nd, 3rd and 4th Battalions, VNMC operation	Tây Ninh Province		
Sep 11 – Apr 24 1969	Operation Lam Son 261	1st ARVN Regiment operation	Thừa Thiên and Quảng Trị Provinces	724	
Sep 12 – 24	Operation Hawkesbury	1st Battalion, Royal Australian Regiment and 4th Battalion, Royal Australian Regiment/Royal New Zealand Infantry Regiment (ANZAC) security operation	Bien Hoa–Long Khánh Province border		
Sep 13	Operation Sullivan	1st Brigade, 5th Infantry Division search and destroy operation	Quảng Trị Province		
Sep 16 – Oct 19	Operation Golden Sword	Movement of the 3rd Brigade, 101st Airborne Division to northern I Corps and the 3rd Brigade 82nd Airborne Division to III Corps			
Sep 19 – 25	Operation Crown	3rd Battalion, Royal Australian Regiment reconnaissance in force operation	Phước Tuy Province		
Sep 24 – Oct 4	Operation Pioneer	1st Battalion, 11th Infantry Regiment clear and search operation	Quảng Trị Province		
Sep 25 – Oct 14	Operation Owen Mesa	3rd Battalion, 26th Marines clear and search operation	Quảng Nam and Thừa Thiên Provinces		
Sep 26 – Nov 17	Operation Golden Fleece	2nd Battalion, 1st Infantry Division operation			
Sep 27 – 29	Operation Phu Vang I	1st and 2nd Brigades, 101st Airborne Division and ARVN 54th Regiment search and destroy operation	Thừa Thiên Province		
Sep 29 – Oct 6	Operation Sceptre	4th Battalion, Royal Australian Regiment/Royal New Zealand Infantry Regiment (ANZAC) reconnaissance in force operation	near Ap Sui Nghe, Phước Tuy Province		
Sep 29 – Oct 12	Operation Windsor	1st Battalion, Royal Australian Regiment reconnaissance in force	Biên Hòa Province		5
Sep 30 – Oct 5	Operation Talladega Canyon	2nd Battalion, 7th Marines clear and search operation	Quảng Nam Province		
Oct 1 – 8	Operation Dukes Glade	11th Infantry Brigade clear and search operation	Quảng Nam Province		
Oct 3 – Nov 2	Operation Commanche Falls II	1st Cavalry Division clear and search operation	Quảng Trị and Thừa Thiên Provinces		
Oct 6	Operation Hung Quang 174	282nd Assault Helicopter Company and ARVN 51st Regiment operation to relieve pressure on surrounded Special Forces camp	Thuong Duc, Quảng Nam Province		
Oct 6 – 19	Operation Maui Peak	1st Battalion, 1st Marines, 2nd Battalion, 5th Marines, 3rd Battalion, 5th Marines, 2nd Battalion, 7th Marines and 3rd Battalion, 7th Marines effort to relieve the Special Forces camp at Thường Ðức	Quảng Nam Province	353	28
Oct 7 – 12	Operation Logan Field	1st Battalion 20th Infantry, 11th Light Infantry Brigade and 23rd Infantry Division search and destroy operation	northeast of Quảng Ngãi City	14	13
Oct 8 – Apr 1 1971	Operation Sealords	US Navy and South Vietnamese Navy interdiction campaign in the Mekong Delta to disrupt PAVN/VC supply lines in and around the delta	Mekong Delta		
Oct 12 – 30	Operation Capital	3rd Battalion, Royal Australian Regiment and 4th Battalion, Royal Australian Regiment/Royal New Zealand Infantry Regiment (ANZAC) reconnaissance in force operation	15 km northeast of Nui Dat	2	26
Oct 15	Operation War Bonnet	Special Forces Detachment B-52, Project DELTA and 282nd Assault Helicopter Company reconnaissance operation	around An Hoa, Quảng Nam Province		
Oct 16 – Apr 24 1969	Operation Lam Son 271	ARVN 2nd Regiment operation	Quảng Trị Province	603	
Oct 18 – 19	Operation Dale Common	3rd Brigade, 1st Infantry Division, 11th Light Infantry Brigade, 23rd Infantry Division search and destroy operation	Mo Duc, Quảng Ngãi Province	23	
Oct 23 – 27	Operation Rich	1st Brigade, 5th Infantry Division combined arms assault near the Bến Hải River	DMZ, Quảng Trị Province	308	8
Oct 23 – Dec 6	Operation Henderson Hill	1st Battalion, 5th Marines, 2nd Battalion, 5th Marines and 3rd Battalion, 5th Marines search and clear operations as a continuation of Operation Mameluke Thrust	north-central Quảng Nam Province	700	110
Oct 24 – Nov 25	Operation Dawson River Afton	1st Battalion, 9th Marines, 2nd Battalion, 9th Marines and 3rd Battalion, 9th Marines clear and search operation	Đa Krông Valley, Quảng Trị Province		
Oct 25 – Nov 2	Operation Harvest	3rd Battalion, Royal Australian Regiment reconnaissance in force and interdiction operation	Phước Tuy Province		
Oct 25 – Nov 2	Operation Vernon Lake I	11th Infantry Brigade clear and search operation	west of Quảng Ngãi, Quảng Ngãi Province	455	35
Oct 25 – Nov 6	Operation Phu Vang III	2nd Brigade, 101st Airborne Division and ARVN 54th Regiment clear and search operation	Thừa Thiên Province		
Oct 25 – Nov 16	Operation Garrard Bay	2nd Battalion, 26th Marines clear and search operation	Quảng Nam Province	19	7
Oct 27 – Nov 1	Operation Sabine Draw	2nd Battalion, 7th Marines clear and search operation	Quảng Nam Province		
Oct 28 – Nov 20	Operation Liberty Canyon	Redeployment of the 1st Cavalry Division to III Corps			
Nov 1 – Feb 69	Operation Napoleon Saline II	3rd Marine Division, 1st Brigade, 5th Infantry Division strike operation in the vicinity of Quảng Trị City in coordination with ARVN forces including the 1st Regiment, 1st Division to support the pacification of Quảng Trị Province			
Nov 2 – 7	Operation Search Turn	US and Vietnamese Navy operation to interdict the waterways and canals in Kiên Giang Province along the Cambodian border and to secure the canals running between Ha Tien and Rạch Giá	Kien Giang Province	219	
Nov 2 – 15	Operation Commanche Falls III	1st Cavalry Division, 1st Brigade, 5th Infantry Division and ARVN 1st Division clear and search operation	southeast of Quảng Trị City		
Nov 2 – Feb 28 1969	Operation Vernon Lake II	11th Infantry Brigade operation	Song Re Valley, Quảng Ngãi Province	455	35
Nov 7 – 13	Operation Nicoliet Bay	1st Battalion, 13th Marines and 1st and 3rd Battalions, 26th Marines clear and search operation	Quảng Nam Province		
Nov 15 – Mar 1972	Operation Commando Hunt	USAF, US Navy, USMC and Royal Lao Air Force dry season phase of the air interdiction campaign to bomb the Ho Chi Minh Trail	eastern Laos		
Nov 16 – Mar 12 1969	Operation Sheridan Sabre	2/1 Cavalry, 3/1 Cavalry, 1st Squadron, 11th Armored Cavalry Regiment and ARVN 36th Regiment screening operation to prevent PAVN infiltration	Bình Long Province	2898	219
Nov 20 – Dec 9	Operation Meade River/Operation Hung Quang 1/81	1st Battalion, 1st Marines, 2nd Battalion, 1st Marines, 3rd Battalion, 1st Marines, 2nd Battalion, 5th Marines, 3rd Battalion, 5th Marines, 1st Battalion, 7th Marines, 2nd Battalion, 7th Marines and 2nd and 3rd Battalions, 26th Marines and ARVN 51st Regiment cordon and search operations in support of Accelerated Pacification Campaign	south of Da Nang	1023	108 US, 2 ARVN
Nov 20 – Dec 16	Operation Kudzu II	9th Infantry Division reconnaissance in force operation	Dinh Truong Province		
Nov 24 – 30	Operation Piedmont Swift	2nd Brigade, 25th Infantry Division clear and search operation	Hậu Nghĩa Province		
Nov 28 – Jan 26 1969	Operation Dawson River	1st Battalion, 9th Marines, 2nd Battalion, 9th Marines and 3rd Battalion, 9th Marines clear and search operation	vicinity of Khe Sanh, Quảng Trị Province		
Dec 68 – Jan 14 1969	Operation Blackhawk	1/7 Cavalry operation in the 44th Special Tactical Zone to place round-the-clock pressure on infiltration routes along the Cambodian border and keep a constant watch for VC movement	north of Vĩnh Long	30	29
Dec 1 – Feb 28 1969	Operation Hardin Falls	198th Infantry Brigade clear and search operation	Quảng Trị Province		
Dec 1 – May 11, 1969	Operation Speedy Express	9th Infantry Division and ARVN 7th Division operation to prevent VC units from interfering with pacification efforts, interdict lines of communication and deny them the use of base areas	Kien Hoa and Vĩnh Bình Provinces	10,889	40
Dec 3 – Feb 17 1969	Operation Goodwood	2nd Squadron SAS 9th Battalion, Royal Australian Regiment and 4th Battalion, Royal Australian Regiment/Royal New Zealand Infantry Regiment (ANZAC) security operation	Biên Hòa Province		
Dec 6	Operation Giant Slingshot	Third Sealords barrier established along the Vam Co Tay and Vam Co Dong rivers to interdict PAVN/VC supply routes leading from the Cambodian Parrot's Beak into the III Corps area of South Vietnam			
Dec 6 – Mar 9 1969	Operation Taylor Common	1st Battalion, 3rd Marines, 3rd Battalion, 3rd Marines, 1st Battalion, 5th Marines, 2nd Battalion, 5th Marines, 3rd Battalion, 5th Marines, 2nd Battalion, 7th Marines and 2nd and 3rd Battalions, 26th Marines operation to clear the An Hoa Basin, neutralize PAVN Base Area 112 and develop Fire Support Bases to interdict PAVN infiltration routes leading from the Laotian border	An Hoa Basin	1398	151
Dec 8 – Feb 10 1969	Operation Le Loi I	ARVN 1st Ranger Group operation	Quảng Nam Province	695	
Dec 9 – Feb 28 1969	Operation Marshall Mountain	1st Brigade, 5th Infantry Division and ARVN 1st Regiment clear and search operation	Quảng Trị Province	78	6
Dec 10 – 11	Operation King Hit	9th Battalion, Royal Australian Regiment cordon and search operation	An Nhut village, Phước Tuy Province		
Dec 11 – Jan 9 1969	Operation Phu Vang IV	2nd Brigade, 101st Airborne Division and ARVN 54th Regiment clear and search operation	Thừa Thiên Province		
Dec 15 – Jan 5 1969	Operation Valiant Hunt	BLT 2nd Battalion, 26th Marines and HMM-362 clear and search operation	Barrier Island, south of Hội An, Quảng Nam Province	33	3
Dec 15 – Feb 13 1969	Operation Navajo Warhorse I	1st Cavalry Division operation	Hậu Nghĩa Province		
Dec 15 – Feb 28 1969	Operation Fayette Canyon	196th Infantry Brigade clear and search operation	Quảng Nam Province	322	72
Dec 16 – 24	Operation Rawlings Valley	3rd Brigade, 101st Airborne Division clear and search operation	Thừa Thiên Province		
Dec 18 – 25	Operation Chicago Fire	US Army-VC prisoner release operation	Tây Ninh Province		
Dec 27 – 31	Operation Boundary Rider	9th Battalion, Royal Australian Regiment blocking and search operation	Phước Tuy Province		
Dec 30	Operation Clean Sweep II	2nd Brigade, 25th Infantry Division search and destroy operation	Hậu Nghĩa Province		
Dec 31 – Jan 13 1969	Operation Todd Forest	3rd Brigade, 101st Airborne Division reconnaissance in force operation with the 1st Battalion, 506th Airborne Infantry Regiment and the ARVN 1st Regiment	16 km south of Huế, Thừa Thiên Province	12	

== See also ==
- List of allied military operations of the Vietnam War (1969)
