= Easter Offensive in southern Cambodia and the Mekong Delta =

Part of the Vietnam War (1972)

- Part of the Vietnam War
Date	22 March – 31 August 1972
Location	Cambodia-South Vietnam border and Mekong Delta, South Vietnam
Result	Allied victory

Belligerents
South Vietnam; Khmer Republic; United States	North Vietnam; Viet Cong

Commanders and leaders
(South Vietnam) Nguyễn Vĩnh Nghi	Hoàng Văn Thái

Units involved
(South Vietnam) IV Corps; 7th Division; 9th Division; 21st Division; 44th Special Tactical Zone; Regional Forces; Popular Forces; (Khmer Republic) Khmer National Army (United States) U.S. MACV advisors: U.S. Air Force	B2 Front; 101D Regiment; 52nd Regiment (E46); E44 Regiment; Z15 Regiment; 18B Regiment; 95A Regiment; D1 Regiment; D2 Regiment; D3 Regiment; Dong Thap 1 Regt.; Viet Cong local forces

The Easter Offensive in southern Cambodia and the Mekong Delta was part of the People’s Army of Vietnam (PAVN)’s Easter Offensive of 1972 and saw PAVN and Viet Cong (VC) engage the Army of the Republic of Vietnam (ARVN) and Khmer National Armed Forces (FANK) supported by the United States along the southern Cambodian border with South Vietnam and in the Mekong Delta of South Vietnam. The offensive failed to seriously disrupt the vital South Vietnamese supply routes in the Delta or the pacification efforts there.

== Background ==
The Mekong Delta was the heartland of agricultural South Vietnam, it encompassed the fertile alluvial plains formed by the Mekong River and its main tributary, the Bassac River. With its sixteen provinces, the Delta contained about two-thirds of the nation's population and yielded the same proportion in rice production. The terrain of IV Corps differed radically from other regions. Flat and mostly uncovered, it consisted of mangrove swamps and ricefields crisscrossed by an interlocking system of canals, natural and artificial. Except for some isolated mountains to the west near the Cambodian border, few areas in the Delta had an elevation of more than 10 feet (3.0 m) above sea level. During the monsoon season, most of the swampy land north of Route QL-4, generally called the Plain of Reeds, was inundated, especially when alluvial waters raised the level of the Mekong River from July to October. Other undeveloped swampy areas along the coast had turned into havens that sheltered VC main force units just as the scattered bases inland offered good refuge for local guerrillas.

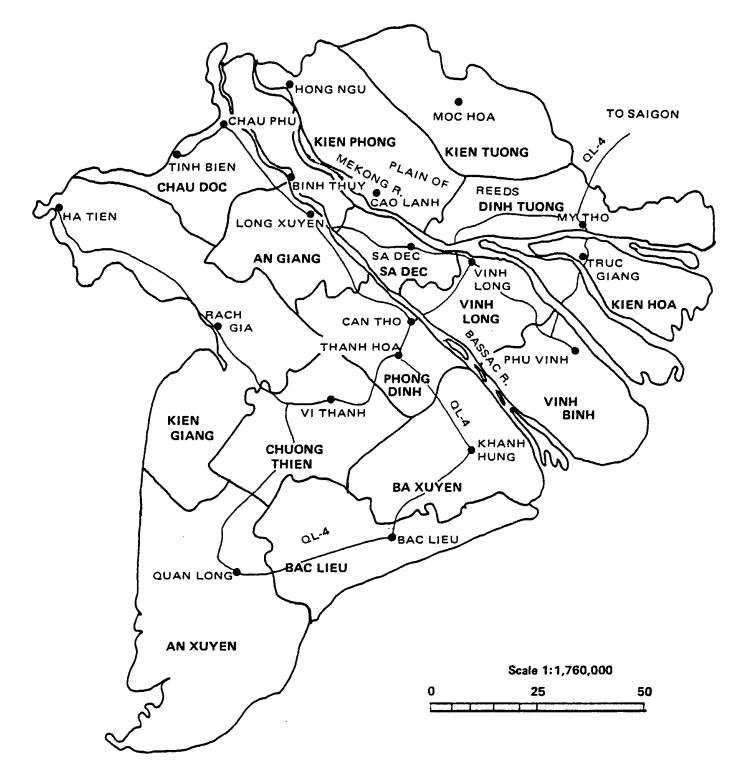
Mekong Delta - ARVN Military Region 4 in 1972

ARVN forces under the control of IV Corps consisted of three infantry divisions, two mobile and six Border Ranger groups. In addition, the Regional and Popular Forces of MR-4 totaled about 200,000, by far the most numerous among the four military regions. The ARVN 7th Division was headquartered at Đồng Tâm Base Camp in Định Tường Province; the 9th Division was located in Sa Đéc and the 21st Division usually operated in the Cà Mau Peninsula from its headquarters at Bạc Liêu. Despite the substantial combat support and significant advisory effort, both military and civilian, provided by the United States, primary responsibility for the combat effort in MR-4 had always been Vietnamese, even during the period when U.S. units operated in the Mekong Delta.

Central Office for South Vietnam (COSVN) emphasized the strategic importance of the Mekong Delta and conceived it as the principal battlefield where the outcome of the war in South Vietnam would be decided and in early 1970 it infiltrated the PAVN 1st Division Headquarters and its three regiments, the 88th, 95A and 101D into MR-4. This effort succeeded despite heavy losses. IV Corps forces were thrown off-balance and the pacification effort declined as a result of extensive PAVN attacks and shellings. Not until after the PAVN sanctuaries beyond the border had been destroyed during the Cambodian Campaign and their capability to resupply from the sea eliminated were these 1st Division forces compelled to break down into small elements and withdraw. Part of these elements fell back into mini-bases within MR-4; others retreated toward Cambodia.

IV Corps was therefore able to regain the initiative during 1971. Its efforts during the year consisted of continuing operations on Cambodian soil to assist the weaker Khmer National Armed Forces (FANK) and interdicting enemy supply routes into the Mekong Delta. Concurrently, it also emphasized the elimination of the PAVN/VC bases in the Delta. ARVN forces succeeded in penetrating and destroying most of these bases. In addition, they also established a new system of outposts to maintain South Vietnamese government control over what had been the PAVN/VC’s long-established base areas. The most significant achievements during this period were the neutralization of the extremely heavy enemy fortifications in the Bảy Núi area by the ARVN 9th Division, the continued destruction of PAVN/VC installations in the U Minh Forest by the 21st Division, the coordinated activities of the 7th Division and territorial forces in Base Area 470 on the boundary of Định Tường and Kien Phong Provinces, and finally, the successful pacification campaign in Kien Hoa Province, the cradle of VC insurgency.

As a result of these achievements by early 1972 about 95% of the Delta population lived in secure villages and hamlets. Rice production had increased substantially and education was available to every child of school age. Key South Vietnamese government programs such as Land-to-the-Tiller and Hamlet Self-Development were gaining momentum and in March 1972 the government initiated the four-year Community Defense and Local Development Plan.

Prior to the Easter Offensive PAVN/VC activities in the Delta were at a low level, consisting mostly of small-unit attacks, harassment of outposts and scattered road interdiction. The PAVN/VC seemed to be concentrating their effort on building up supplies in his base areas, particularly in the U Minh Forest and in Định Tường Province, preparing for future attacks. At that time, PAVN/VC forces in the Mekong Delta consisted primarily of six local force regiments, all implanted in their safe havens. The 18B and 95A Regiments were in the U Minh area; the D1 and D2 Regiments were reported southwest of Chương Thiện Province; the D3 Regiment was scattered along the common boundary of Vĩnh Long and Vĩnh Bình Provinces; and the Dong Thap 1 Regiment was located in an area south of Route QL-4 in Định Tường Province. Probable reinforcements from beyond the Cambodian border included the PAVN 1st Division which might be introduced into Châu Đốc and Kiên Giang Provinces and the Z15 Regiment north of Kiến Tường Province.

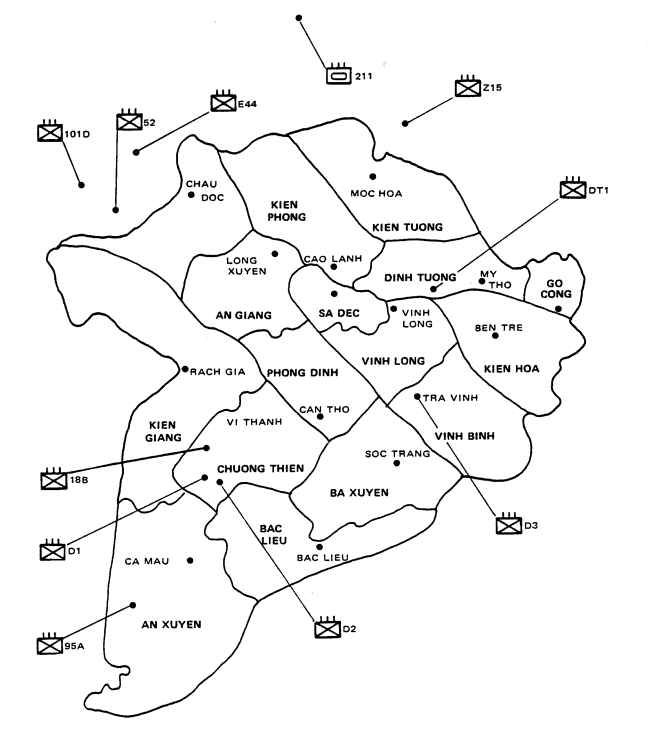
PAVN Regimental Dispositions in ARVN IV Corps in early April 1972

During this time, the defense of the border for MR-4 was assigned to the 44th Special Tactical Zone (STZ) whose Border Ranger and armor forces were deployed as a screen along the Cambodian border from the Parrot's Beak area to the Gulf of Thailand. In addition to its territorial defense responsibility inside MR-4, the 44th STZ also operationally controlled two major bases in Cambodia, Neak Loeung, at Highway 1 (Cambodia) ferry crossing of the Mekong River and Kompong Trach, some 20 km north of Hà Tiên. Both bases were secured by ARVN ranger forces. The 9th Division was then conducting operations in the upper U Minh area and in Chương Thiện Province while the 21st Division operated in the lower U Minh area and in the southern portion of the Cà Mau peninsula. Meanwhile, the 7th Division was responsible for the two contested areas of MR-4, Định Tường and Kien Hoa Provinces, and other provinces sandwiched between the Mekong and Bassac Rivers.

In mid-March, an ARVN intelligence report indicated that the entire PAVN 1st Division was moving southward in Kampot Province, Cambodia, to an area deeper south than where it had been in late 1970. Two other PAVN regiments, 18B and 95A, were also reported leaving the U Minh area and moving eastward in the direction of Chương Thiện Province. These movements undoubtedly presaged major actions in the Mekong Delta during the 1972 dry season.

== Offensive ==
=== Battle of Kompong Trach ===
Kompong Trach was a small Cambodian town located near a road intersection in a lightly forested area north of Hà Tiên, about 15 kilometers north of the border. IV Corps maintained an operational base there which controlled one of the PAVN/VC's major supply routes from Cambodia into the Mekong Delta.

The battle for Kompong Trach started on 22 March with an engagement between elements of the 42nd Ranger Group and the PAVN 101D Regiment and did not abate until the end of April. Apparently, it had not been the PAVN's choice to fight a major battle in this area at this time. The initial engagement, however, developed into a significant battle as reinforcements kept pouring in from both sides. On the ARVN side, a large force was committed which eventually consisted of four armored cavalry squadrons, including the 7th Division's organic squadron, deployed across the entire width of MR-4 from its easternmost corner over one hundred kilometers away, six Ranger battalions, artillery units and supporting engineer elements. The PAVN initially committed only the 101D Regiment and supporting elements of the 1st Division. Eventually, however, they were forced to throw in two additional regiments in rapid succession, the 52nd (aka E46) and E44, which were then on their way into MR-4.

In spite of heavy losses incurred by both sides and the fact that eventually the ARVN base at Kompong Trach had to be evacuated, the battle resulted in a major defeat for the PAVN. The 1st Division, which was the only division size unit committed to the Mekong Delta at that time, had been forced to exhaust its combat potential on Cambodian soil whereas it was apparently needed to conduct major actions inside MR-4 in concert with the Easter Offensive and their mission to destroy the pacification progress in IV Corps caused only minor disruption. Heavy losses were inflicted on the 1st Division by ARVN armor firepower and the devastating U.S. Air Force (USAF) and Republic of Vietnam Air Force (VNAF) airstrikes during massed infantry assaults.

=== Hậu Giang ===
While the battle at Kompong Trach was raging, the PAVN/VC initiated offensive activities in the Mekong Delta with a series of attacks on 7 April. Most of these attacks occurred in Chương Thiện Province. They were conducted by four local main force units, the 18B, 95A, D1 and D2 Regiments, which almost in unison endeavored to destroy all ARVN bases and outposts along the PAVN/VC communication routes. These routes originated in the large U Minh base area, ran through the provinces of Chương Thiện and Phong Dinh, then connected the Hậu Giang Province area (west of the Bassac River) with Tiền Giang Province (east of the Mekong River).

Elsewhere in the Delta, PAVN/VC main force and local units also surfaced to put pressure on RF/PF forces in an attempt to disrupt the South Vietnamese pacification program. Despite the fact that these attacks were spread over a large geographical area, the PAVN/VC offensive affected only remote outposts and territorial forces, almost to the exclusion of ARVN main force units. To help maintain tactical balance for MR-4, U.S. tactical air and B-52 strikes, which had not been used in the Delta since the beginning of 1972, resumed in support of ARVN forces at Kompong Trach and in other areas under contest throughout MR-4. This air support had a significant impact on the outcome of the PAVN/VC offensive. Without it, it is doubtful that the ARVN ground forces would have been able to defeat so decisively the large PAVN/VC forces engaged in these battle areas.

On 7 April, the day PAVN/VC attacks began in MR-4, the 21st Division was ordered to prepare for movement to MR-3. By 10 April the first elements of this division were already deployed along Route QL-13 north of Lai Khê. Then on 12 May, another MR-4 unit, the 15th Regiment, 9th Division, was deployed to MR-3 in the effort to relieve PAVN pressure on An Lộc. These redeployments resulted in voids which would affect the defense posture of MR-4. Consequently, IV Corps had to readjust the tactical areas of responsibility over the entire border area with its mobile and Border Ranger units, to include a Ranger group just released from its reinforcement mission in MR-1. The 9th Division took over responsibility for all the provinces in the Hậu Giang/Bassac area while the 7th Division was given responsibility for the Tiền Giang/Mekong area with the majority of its effort concentrated north of Route QL-4.

On 18 May, elements of the PAVN 52nd and 101D Regiments attacked Kiên Lương, a district town in northern Kiên Giang Province, some 20 km southeast of Hà Tiên. This was the first instance of significant PAVN re-infiltration into the Mekong Delta since the 1st Division was driven out of the Bảy Núi area in April 1971. The battle took place around the cement plant and in the town's market area. PAVN sappers initially succeeded in penetrating and holding the plant's personnel living quarters and a few blocks in town. They quickly organized these areas into solid defense positions. Fighting continued for ten days before ARVN Ranger and armor forces, in coordination with local RF and PF units, forced the PAVN troops from both areas. PAVN forces withdrew toward the Cambodian border, leaving behind hundreds of bodies scattered among the ruins.

After the battle, the situation in the provinces west of the Bassac River returned to normal. The four PAVN/VC local force regiments in this area were unable to renew any significant activity, battered as they were by successive B-52 strikes and constant attacks by ARVN forces. They managed only to harass isolated bases and outposts manned by the RF and PF.

In the meantime, indications were being obtained by ARVN-U.S. intelligence of a strong enemy buildup in the Parrot's Beak and Elephant's Foot (10.87°N 105.9°E) areas near the border in northern Kiến Tường Province. These reports pointed toward major actions in the Tiền Giang/Mekong area for which the 7th Division was responsible.

=== Tiền Giang ===
On 23 May, a small engagement took place between ARVN Ranger and armor forces of the 44th STZ and the PAVN 207th Regiment in an area on the Cambodian side of the border, some 15 kilometers north of Cai Cai, a district town located on the common boundary of Kiến Tường and Kiến Phong Provinces near the Cambodian border. During this battle, ARVN forces captured some PAVN documents which contained plans for the infiltration of PAVN units into northern Kiến Tường Province and subsequent attacks against Mộc Hóa, the provincial capital. Then on 10 June, prisoner sources disclosed that the PAVN 5th Division, which had failed in its earlier effort to take An Lộc in MR-3, was being redeployed to the Elephant's Foot area on Cambodian territory. Eventually, this unit was to move into Base Area 470 in the Plains of Reeds.

To the IV Corps commander, Major General Nguyễn Vĩnh Nghi, who had participated in MR-3 operations during the initial stage of the siege of An Lộc, it became evident that after being defeated there, the hungry 5th Division was trying to seek refuge in the food-rich Mekong Delta. Nghi was determined therefore to deny the PAVN this refuge. Actually, a new phase of the PAVN offensive was about to begin that would involve IV Corps forces in major battles not only in the Tiền Giang area but also in Cambodia.

Within 48 hours, General Nghi moved the 7th Division Headquarters and two regiments into the Elephant's Foot area north of Kiến Tường Province. Soon this division was joined by its remaining elements. At the same time, U.S. tactical air and B-52 strikes repeatedly pounded away at PAVN troop concentrations in the area. IV Corps's quick action was timely and effective, successfully stopping the PAVN effort to infiltrate major units into MR-4; it also afforded IV Corps more time to consolidate the defense of Dinh Tuong Province which from all indications had been the PAVN's choice for refuge and future actions.

Subsequently, several heavy engagements occurred in the Elephant's Foot area. The PAVN had brought along a powerful array of antiaircraft weapons to include the SA-7 Man-portable air-defense system which was used for the first time in the Delta. These weapons curtailed the activities of our helicopters and observation planes and inflicted extensive damage on VNAF aircraft but intercepted by the 7th Division forces while on the move, PAVN units were surprised and suffered heavy losses. After 20 days of combat, the 7th Division was in total control of the area. Following this victory on 30 June, the division commander, Brigadier General Nguyễn Khoa Nam, pushed his forces farther north with more success.

However, the PAVN seemed oblivious to the serious losses they had incurred, shifting their movement westward, pushing their regiments, two from the 5th Division and the 24th and Z18, deeper into the Tiền Giang area toward Base Area 470 where these units were to join forces with the Z15 and Dong Thap 1 Regiments. By early July, therefore, a total of six PAVN regiments were reported in northern Định Tường Province, about 65 km southwest of Saigon. Định Tường Province was about to become the area for a major contest, and perhaps this was the primary goal of the PAVN offensive in the Mekong Delta.

In the meantime, and in conjunction with PAVN efforts to infiltrate the Tiền Giang area, other units, probably elements of the 9th Division, began moving toward Kompong Trabek which they took in mid-June. With the support of local Khmer Rouge units, these PAVN forces were endeavoring to tighten control over Route QL-1 from the Parrot's Beak area to Neak Loeung on the Mekong River. By 2 July, only two towns remained under FANK control in this area, Neak Loeung and Svay Rieng.

Since the FANK forces were unable to dislodge the PAVN from Kompong Trabek, a combined FANK-ARVN operation was launched to retake the town. After 22 days of fighting, ARVN forces succeeded in recapturing Kompong Trabek and clearing Route QL-1 westward after a link-up with Neak Loeung. However, the PAVN were determined to keep this town under their control since it was located between two of their main supply lines. Consequently, as soon as ARVN units redeployed to the Delta, PAVN forces would return and occupy the town. This occurred not once but several times. Finally, PAVN pressure within MR-4 became so heavy that ARVN forces could no longer afford to recapture Kompong Trabek for the benefit of the FANK.

=== Định Tường ===
The PAVN/VC took advantage of the void left in Định Tường Province by the 7th Division, which was then conducting operations in Cambodia. The PAVN/VC launched a series of coordinated attacks against three district towns, Sam Giang, Cái Bè and Cai Lậy during the period from 17 May to 11 July. The attacking forces initially consisted of elements of the Dong Thap 1 and Z15 Regiments. All of these attacks were driven back by RF/PF forces with the strong support provided by U.S. tactical air and helicopter gunships. The PAVN/VC were finally forced to withdraw into Base Area 470 to refit and recover for future actions.

Despite initial setbacks, PAVN/VC pressure was also mounting at this time on Route QL-4, the vital supply line between the Delta's ricebowl and Saigon. Indications were that the PAVN/VC were bringing more troops into the area. As a result, IV Corps had to move the 7th Division back into its tactical area of responsibility, leaving behind only one regiment to form a screen along the border. By that time, the 15th Regiment, 9th Division had accomplished its mission south of An Lộc and was released by MR-3 for return to MR-4. It was immediately deployed to Định Tường at the same time as two Ranger groups and the Ranger Command of MR-4. To defeat the PAVN/VC effort against Route QL-4 in Định Tường, B-52 strikes were concentrated on PAVN/VC bases in the Delta whenever fighting became intense and profitable targets were detected.

In mid-August, as the situation in Bình Long Province became stabilized, the 21st Division was returned to MR-4 and reassigned the responsibility for the southern Hậu Giang area, its former territory. Elements of the 9th Division which formerly operated in this area were directed to the Tiền Giang area where they concentrated on Định Tường. These redeployments enabled the 7th Division to devote its effort to Kiến Tường Province in the north and the border area. The 44th STZ meanwhile was assigned the responsibility for the area west of the Mekong River and south of the Cambodian border, to include the eastern part of Kiến Phong Province. The 7th Division was assigned a similar area of responsibility east of the Mekong River, to include the entire province of Kiến Tường.

During this period the Ranger forces and 9th Division, which were occasionally reinforced with the 10th and 12th Regiments, 7th Division, fought many fierce battles in Định Tường Province and in Base Area 470. In early August, the Ranger forces under MR-4 Ranger Command fought a major battle in the Hau My area west-northwest of Mỹ Tho, and completely cleared this area of the PAVN/VC. This enabled IV Corps to rebuild a system of outposts along the Tháp Mười Canal and reestablish South Vietnamese government control over this area which had been subverted by the PAVN/VC since the beginning of the Easter Offensive. By the end of August, PAVN/VC activities in Định Tường Province had been seriously impeded by aggressive ARVN reactions on the ground and continuous pounding from the air by U.S. tactical air and B-52's.

In late August and early September, IV Corps shifted its effort toward the Bảy Núi area in Châu Đốc Province where intelligence reports strongly indicated reinfiltration by elements of the PAVN 1st Division In a quick move, IV Corps brought its forces westward into Châu Đốc and across the Cambodian border into an area west of Nui 0. At the same time, it moved the 44th STZ Headquarters back to Chi Lang with the mission of engaging the PAVN 1st Division, turning over Kiến Phong Province to the ARVN 7th Division.

== Aftermath ==
The official PAVN history claims that the PAVN/VC "eliminated more than 30,000 enemy troops from the battlefield, annihilated ten enemy battalions, attacked and crippled five regiments of the 7th and 9th Divisions, annihilated or forced 500 outposts to surrender, liberated 350,000 people and gained control of over 72 villages in Mỹ Tho Province and in parts of Bến Tre, Kiến Phong and Kiến Tường Provinces."

During September, the situation in the Delta remained relatively uneventful. Not until early October did PAVN/VC-initiated actions resume again at a high level. The increased effort appeared to have some connection with the ceasefire agreement which was being finalized in Paris. In this effort, the PAVN 1st Division sent two regiments, the 42nd and 101D, south into An Giang Province and concurrently west into the Ba Hon Mountain area near the coast in Hà Tiên Province. East of the Mekong River, elements of the PAVN 207th and E2 Regiments, which were operating in the area of Kompong Trabek and north of Cai Cai, also infiltrated into Kiến Phong Province. South of the Bassac River, the PAVN 18B, 95A, D1 and D2 Regiments simultaneously moved eastward, establishing blocking positions along lines of communication and among populous areas. This fanning-out pattern clearly indicated an attempt by the PAVN/VC to extend their presence over the Delta, undoubtedly in preparation for a ceasefire in place. However, by the end of October when the ceasefire agreement failed to materialize, these activities declined significantly.

In late October and early November, the ARVN 7th Division made several contacts with the PAVN/VC in Kiến Phong Province. During a battle in the Hồng Ngự District where the Mekong River crossed the border, elements of the Division, in coordination with RF/PF forces, annihilated a battalion of the PAVN 207th Regiment, taking 73 prisoners during eight days of engagement. Most of the prisoners were teenagers, ill-fed and ill-equipped, some without weapons or ammunition. They disclosed that they had been abandoned by their leaders who fled when the fighting became tough.

Along the common boundary of Kiến Tường and Kiến Phong Provinces, the ARVN 10th Regiment, 7th Division supported by United States Army Air Cavalry teams also had repeated success during contacts made with infiltrated elements of the PAVN E2 Regiment, 5th Division. A PAVN/VC scheme to attack Cao Lãnh, the provincial capital of Kiến Phong, was preempted by the quick deployment of the 11th and 12th Regiments, 7th Division into this area.

Meanwhile, farther west of the Bassac River, Ranger forces of the 44th STZ conducted successful operations in Hà Tiên Province and the Bảy Núi area. During these operations, they captured several supply caches, destroyed PAVN/VC installations and inflicted substantial losses to elements of the 52nd and 101D Regiments, 1st Division. A battalion commander of the 52nd NVA Regiment surrendered to the Rangers and he disclosed that his battalion had been so severely mauled by ARVN ambushes and airstrikes that only 30 men were left.

As of mid-December, the overall situation in the Mekong Delta returned to its pre-offensive quietness. IV Corps took advantage of this respite to readjust command and control, expanding the 7th Division's TAOR to include both Dinh Tuong and Gò Công Provinces as the first step. The 9th Division was then assigned responsibility for the provinces of Sa Đéc, Vĩnh Long, Vĩnh Bình and Kiến Hòa. This extension of ARVN forces brought about an improvement in territorial security, especially in those areas where PAVN/VC pressure was heavy and RF/PF forces needed ARVN support.

This quiet period lasted only for about two weeks through Christmas and New Year's Day. After that, PAVN/VC-initiated activities resumed at a fairly high level. However, despite their increased frequency, most of these activities were low-keyed and inconsequential. It was obvious then that the October pattern was repeating itself and the PAVN/VC were apparently more concerned with their omni-presence as a psychological and political ploy to influence the local population and stimulate the morale of their own troops than trying to obtain military gains. This was the situation throughout the Mekong Delta on the eve of the ceasefire.

In summary, in spite of multiple efforts and heavy sacrifices during the Easter Offensive, the PAVN/VC accomplished very little in the Mekong Delta. Route QL-4, which was one among the major objectives, remained open throughout his offensive save for brief periods of traffic interruption. They had failed to strangle this vital lifeline and had also failed to disrupt the pacification effort. No district town ever fell into enemy hands, even temporarily. Despite some ups and downs in the pacification effort, the PAVN/VC were unable to achieve any additional gains in population control. Although not as dramatic as the combat exploits achieved in An Lộc, Kontum or Quảng Trị, IV Corps won the battles in the Mekong Delta while sharing nearly half of its forces with MR-3 and MR-1.
