= Battle of Tri Phap =

Part of the Vietnam War (1974)

- Part of the Vietnam War
Date	12 February – 4 May 1974
Location	Tri Phap, Dinh Tuong Province, South Vietnam 10.535°N 105.942°E
Result	South Vietnamese victory

Belligerents
North Vietnam	South Vietnam

Commanders and leaders
	MGen Nguyễn Vĩnh Nghi

Units involved
Dong Thap 1 Regiment; E-24th Regiment; Z-15th Regiment; Z-18th Regiment	10th Infantry Regiment; 12th Infantry Regiment; 14th Infantry Regiment; 7th Ranger Group; Regional Forces

Casualties and losses
ARVN body count: 1,100+	~100
- 29 school children killed in North Vietnamese mortar attacks

The Battle of Tri Phap took place from 12 February to 4 May 1974 when South Vietnamese forces successfully launched a pre-emptive attack on a North Vietnamese base area in Dinh Tuong Province before North Vietnamese forces were scheduled to be moved to the area.

== Background ==
One of three principal People's Army of Vietnam (PAVN) infiltration routes, corridor 1-A crossed the Cambodian frontier near the border between Kien Phong and Kiến Tường Provinces, traversed the maze of canals through the Plain of Reeds and ended in the watery wasteland called the Tri Phap (known as Base Area 470 by Allied intelligence) where those provinces join Dinh Tuong Province. A branch of corridor 1-B from the Parrot's Beak of Svay Rieng Province entered the Tri Phap from the northeast. A Viet Minh base established during the First Indochina War, the Tri Phap was partly covered with brush, with little land suitable for cultivation, essentially a swamp that over the years had been laced with permanent fortifications and hidden storage areas. No Allied force had succeeded in occupying or inflicting any serious damage to the installations or forces in the Tri Phap. Immediately after the 28 January 1973 ceasefire, South Vietnamese units in Dinh Tuong were preoccupied with maintaining security in the central and northern reaches of the province and could not divert the forces necessary to clean out the Tri Phap, even though they were aware of increased PAVN activity there.

A document captured on 9 August 1973 disclosed that the Z-18 Regiment of PAVN Military Region 2 was moving into the Tri Phap from Cai Bay District in northern Dinh Tuong Province and that it would probably be replaced in Cai Bay by the Dong Thap 1 Regiment. Information in the document pertaining to planned attacks in northern Dinh Tuong was confirmed by attacks on several outposts on 8 August. Furthermore, aerial photography showed that fields north of the Tri Phap had been planted in rice, part of the PAVN's effort to become self-sustaining in the Mekong Delta. With pressure mounting along Highway 4, however, IV Corps could not then challenge the PAVN activities in and north of the Tri Phap. Nevertheless, the ARVN repulsed, with heavy losses to the PAVN, numerous battalion-sized attacks against outposts and firebases in Cay Bay, Cái Bè and Sam Giang Districts during July and August. In the first week of September alone, PAVN casualties in the region were 144 killed, while those of the ARVN were 17 killed.

The surge in PAVN attacks which continued through November, was motivated in part, by the rice harvest and marked by PAVN attempts to gather as much of it as possible. But beyond that, the PAVN objectives were to protect the installations in the Tri Phap, expand the base area there, and use the infiltration corridors from Cambodia without interference from the ARVN. Success in these ventures would force contractions of the ARVN defenses along Highway 4, demoralize the soldiers of the ARVN 7th Division charged with the responsibility and support the propaganda campaign among ARVN troops.

As the year wore on, ARVN units slowly wore down the four main force regiments in PAVN Military Region 2 - the Z-18th, Z-15th, E-24th and DT1. Despite receiving hundreds of fresh replacements from the north, these regiments gradually lost ground to aggressive attacks. The PAVN 207th Regiment, which had suffered so badly in its disastrous Hồng Ngự campaign, was required to provide soldiers to replace losses in the E-24th Regiment. These demoralized soldiers were intercepted en route to the Tri Phap area in September; their casualties were heavy and 14 were captured. The PAVN 6th Division was disbanded in late 1973 and its depleted regiments were assigned to PAVN Military Region 2. The South Vietnamese Joint Operations Center provided data on casualties in December 1973 that showed nearly 40 percent of all PAVN killed during the last half of 1973 died in the delta. Although the figures were estimations the ratio was probably very close to reality, supported as it was by weapons captured and corresponding ARVN casualties.

The South Vietnamese held the Kien Tuong Province capital of Mộc Hóa and a base at Long Khot (10.92°N 105.8357°E), both of which were well within 105 mm howitzer range of PAVN artillery in Svay Rieng, but there were great reaches of uncontrolled, unoccupied territory between the Cambodian border and the first major population concentration along Highway 4 through Mỹ Tho. The PAVN 5th Division operated out of Svay Rieng Province in both directions, through Tây Ninh Province to An Lộc and south toward Mỹ Tho. In early 1974, the 5th was north of Tây Ninh but available for operations into Kien Tuong and Hậu Nghĩa Provinces.

Although South Vietnamese forces were not strong enough to contain the PAVN in Svay Rieng, they could limit the PAVN's freedom of movement, make resupply of troops costly and difficult, and inflict high casualties. To do this much, the ARVN had to hold Mộc Hóa and Long Khot, seize the PAVN's logistical and operational base around Tri Phap and protect Highway 4 between Cai Lậy District and Mỹ Tho. In January 1974 intelligence became available to IV Corps commander Maj. Gen. Nguyễn Vĩnh Nghi, that elements of the PAVN 5th Division were being ordered to Dinh Tuong Province from Tây Ninh. Later in the month, advance elements of the division were detected in the division's Svay Rieng base.

Two PAVN soldiers captured on 27 January told their interrogators that a battalion of the division's 6th Regiment had been sent south to reinforce the understrength PAVN Z-18 Regiment in the Tri Phap area, Their testimony, along with that of four recent ralliers and captured documents, also indicated that the Dong Thap 1 Regiment, which traditionally operated in Dinh Tuong, was still badly understrength, though it had recently received 300 PAVN replacements following its December 1973 battles and would also probably receive more replacements from the 6th Regiment, 5th Division. The interrogators also learned that the Z-15 Regiment had just received about 200 replacements from the North but that it was short weapons and ammunition. Meanwhile, ARVN outposts, patrols, and air observers detected PAVN transportation elements moving past Tuyen Binh on infiltration Route 1A. Some of these were intercepted, and the ARVN captured large quantities of rice and ammunition, as well as a PAVN transportation company commander.

If the 5th Division were allowed to occupy the Tri Phap, it would be extremely difficult to dig out, and the threat to Highway 4 would become intolerable. The previous year's experience had shown General Nghi that his troops were capable of driving into and probably clearing the Tri Phap of the PAVN elements, particularly if he moved fast while the PAVN regiments were still reforming and receiving replacements. If he could establish a base of operations at Tri Phap, he could deny a vital logistical complex to the 5th Division, one that it would require for operations in Dinh Tuong.

== Battle ==
On 12 February, the ARVN 12th Infantry Regiment, 7th Division, reinforced with two battalions of the 10th Infantry and two troops of armored cavalry in personnel carriers, attacked through Tri Phap from the east and advanced to the Kien Phong-Dien Tuong Province boundary. Three days later, the 14th Infantry Regiment, 9th Division, reinforced with one battalion of the 16th Infantry and two troops of armored cavalry, attacked east from My An District town and linked up with the 12th Infantry on the western edge or the Tri Phap. This two-pronged attack was followed on the 19th by an attack by the 10th Infantry Regiment, minus the two battalions attached to the 12th, from Hau My village in northern Cái Bè District, north to clear the southern edge of the Tri Phap. Completely enveloped, the PAVN in the Tri Phap suffered heavy losses in men and supplies. Elements of the Z-15 and Z-18 were identified in the battle, but most PAVN casualties were among rear service troops. Another element of the PAVN 5th Division, the 6th Battalion, 174th Infantry, was also identified in the heavy fighting around My An on the western edge or the Tri Phap, indicating that earlier intelligence concerning probable deployment of elements of the 5th from Tây Ninh was valid. PAVN casualties were heavy that first week or the Tri Phap campaign; over 500 were killed, and the ARVN captured tons of ammunition and nearly 200 weapons. ARVN casualties were light in comparison.

Fighting flared through most of Kien Tuong and Dinh Tuong Provinces for the rest or February and until the last week of March. The center of action remained in the Tri Phap where the PAVN again reinforced, this time with the Dong Thap 1 Regiment which was sent north to join the Z-18. The ARVN kept up the pressure, and in successive weeks killed another 250 PAVN, capturing as many weapons. Meanwhile, COSVN directed PAVN Military Region 3 (the southern delta command) to launch widespread attacks to take the pressure off Kien Tuong and Dinh Tuong. Replacements, up to 3,000 according to two ARVN soldiers who escaped from captivity in Cambodia, were being readied for assignment to units in Svay Rieng Province.

Unable to counter ARVN advances on the battlefields, the PAVN resorted to an increased terror campaign throughout the delta. On 9 March they fired an 82 mm mortar shell into the primary schoolyard at Cai Lậy while the children were lined up waiting to enter their classes. Twenty-three children died instantly; 46 others were badly wounded. Farther south, in Bạc Lieu, Vietcong tossed a grenade into a religious service killing nine and wounding 16.

ARVN operations on the My An front, on the western edge of the Tri Phap area, were being supported out of Cao Lãnh, with supplies coming up from Giao Duc on interprovincial Route 30. The forces on the eastern edge of the Tri Phap and those fighting north around Moe Hoa were being supported along Interprovincial Route 29 out of Cai Lậy. The ARVN successfully countered PAVN attempts to cut these two routes.

The first phase or the Tri Phap campaign slowly wound down during the last part or March. The Dong Thap 1 Regiment picked up 150 replacements, freshly arrived from North Vietnam, and PAVN Military Region 2, whose regiments were being battered in the Tri Phap fighting, received 200 replacements who had been previously destined for Military Region 3. Reinforcing success in the last week or March, General Nghi sent the 7th Ranger Group against the Dong Thap 1 Regiment in the Tri Phap, where the Rangers killed over 30 and captured more weapons.

By the end of March, more than 1,100 PAVN had been killed in the Tri Phap campaign, while the ARVN had fewer than 100 killed. Nearly 5,000 tons of rice were captured, along with over 600 weapons, eight tons of ammunition and a large haul of weapon accessories, radios and other military equipment. Three PAVN regiments, the Z-15, Z-18 and Dong Thap 1, had been severely mauled, and the Tri Phap base area was denied to the PAVN 5th Division.

Work began immediately on the construction of fortified positions in the Tri Phap, enough to provide for posting an ARVN regiment there. The PAVN Z-15 Regiment meanwhile was recuperating in southwestern Dinh Tuong Province, attacking ARVN outposts and preparing to return to the Tri Phap. On 26 April two PAVN battalions attacked the Regional Force (RF) battalion base at the village of Tri Phap. In a complementary attack farther south on the Kien Phong-Dinh Tuong Province boundary, the Dong Thap 1 Regiment struck another RF outpost. Although temporarily successful, the PAVN soon faced the ARVN's 14th Regiment and a troop of the 2nd Armored Cavalry and was routed with heavy casualties. Meanwhile, the 11th Infantry counterattacked in the Tri Phap and restored the lost position. The ARVN, by the first week in May. was therefore in firm control in the Tri Phap, with four RF battalions holding strong positions there. PAVN forces in the area were weakened and demoralised, but elsewhere in the delta they kept up their campaign of terror and the slow deterioration of local security continued. Although abductions and assassinations were predominant, the PAVN attacked another school. On 4 May, eight rounds of 82 mm mortar shells fell on the school at Song Phu, in Vĩnh Long Province, six children were killed and 28 wounded.

== Aftermath ==
The ARVN had successfully prevented the PAVN 5th Division from establishing a base from which to extend its operations southward into Dinh Tuong Province and westward toward Saigon through Long An Province. Denied this approach, the 5th Division built up their forces on the periphery of the Parrot's Beak, threatening the district headquarters at Mộc Hóa, but, more seriously, preparing to occupy the narrow strip of marshland between the Svay Rieng border and the Yam Co Dong River, the last real barrier between the Cambodian border and Saigon, only 48 km away. PAVN success would have strangled Tây Ninh Province, since the seizure of Go Dau Ha would end all land and water communications between Saigon and Tây Ninh. The ARVN dealt with this threat by launching an armored thrust against PAVN base areas in Svay Rieng starting in late March.
