= 9th Division (South Vietnam) =

9th Infantry Division
- Sư đoàn 9
- 9th Division SSI
- Active: 1961–1975
- Country: South Vietnam
- Branch: ARVN
- Type: Division
- Part of: IV Corps
- Garrison/HQ: Cần Thơ, Sa Dec
- Engagements: Vietnam War: Operation Kien Giang 9-1; Tet Offensive; Battle of An Lộc; Battle of Hồng Ngự; Battle of Tri Phap

Commanders
- Notable commanders: Bui Dzinh; Lam Quang Thi; Tran Ba Di; Huynh Van Lac

Insignia
- Division flag

The 9th Infantry Division (Vietnamese: Sư đoàn 9; Chữ Hán: 師團9) was a division of the Army of the Republic of Vietnam (ARVN) that existed from 1961 to 1975. It was part of the IV Corps that oversaw the southernmost region of South Vietnam, the Mekong Delta. The 9th Infantry Division was based in Sa Dec from 1962 to 1972, and Vinh Long 1972 from 1975 during the war.

== History ==
In March 1961 the newly formed Division began a 22-week training programme. The first commander of the 9th Bo Binh Division was Colonel Bui Dzinh (1961–1963).

=== 1964 ===
On 21 June elements of the Division and the 7th Division massed eight battalions - five infantry, two airborne, and one Civil Guard, a battery of 105mm howitzers and two platoons of 155mm howitzers to encircle an area 15km in diameter centered on the village of My Thien in western Định Tường province. Inside were an estimated 1,000 VC regulars of the 261st, the 502nd, and 514th Battalions, plus two additional companies. The operation began inauspiciously when a Republic of Vietnam Air Force (RVNAF) A-1H fighter-bomber mistakenly attacked the 2nd Battalion, 15th Infantry, causing nine casualties. The major fighting started in the afternoon as the 3rd Airborne Battalion approached the hamlet of Bang Lang. The unit commander decided not to wait for artillery support and led his men in a bayonet charge across 137 meters of muddy paddy into the teeth of entrenched VC machine guns. The battle raged until dark, with fixed-wing aircraft conducting 14 strikes. VC gunners downed four US helicopters. The VC successfully eluded capture that night and two additional days of searching achieved little. The South Vietnamese lost 29 dead and 85 wounded, VC dead numbered almost 100.

On 26 June the 14th Infantry encircled the VC Cuu Long I Battalion near Ap Long Hoi, 14km south of the provincial capital of Trà Vinh. After an infantry battalion had taken up a position to the south and two companies of Civil Guard had deployed to the west, the 43rd Ranger Battalion was landed by helicopters north of the target area. The rangers then advanced southward, split on either side of a canal and engaged the entrenched VC. US Army helicopter gunships and RVNAF fighter-bombers continuously hammered the VC, with the VC shooting down one of each. After four hours the VC disengaged leaving 51 dead, one mortar and 34 weapons. ARVN losses were 20 killed and 19 wounded.

On 11 October the 14th Infantry pushed a VC company into a confined area in Vĩnh Bình province where it was hit by aircraft and artillery. The ARVN commander refused an order from his superior to advance to block the VC escape. The operation continued into the following day, with the ARVN losing four dead and 16 wounded and the VC losing 21 dead, one prisoner, and three weapons.

=== 1965 ===
After the division's intelligence staff located a VC company on the Rach Muong Khai canal in Đức Thành District, an infantry battalion and four territorial companies supported by the 23rd River Assault Group engaged them in an all-day operation. VC losses were 47 killed and 33 weapons captured. ARVN losses were two dead and three wounded.

On 29 May Colonel Lam Quang Thi assumed command of the division. By the end of 1965 the US advisers to the Division regarded Thi as "fair" but lacking in "confidence and aggressiveness." The division had suffered over 1800 desertions in the last six months of the year and morale was low.

On 4 June the Division mounted an operation to reestablish government control in Vĩnh Long province's Cai Nhum District. One Regional Forces battalion and three army battalions advanced along canals from the south, while a fourth army battalion proceeded likewise from the north. The 23rd River Assault Group, with a fifth infantry battalion aboard, blocked potential escape routes. At 13:30, the 1st Battalion, 14th Infantry, which was advancing from the north, encountered a strong VC position near a hamlet. After airstrikes by four USAF B–57s followed by US Army helicopter gunships, the soldiers fixed bayonets and charged the VC, capturing the position. The battalion then surrounded the hamlet overnight. VC losses were 46 killed and seven captured and 31 weapons. The ARVN estimated the VC had carried off another 53 casualties during the night. ARVN losses were four dead and five wounded.

=== 1966–1971 ===
From 15 to 19 November 1967 the division participated in Operation Kien Giang 9-1 with the 7th Division and the 5th Marine Battalion and the US Mobile Riverine Force against the VC 263rd Battalion's Base Area 470 in western Định Tường Province. The operation rendered the 263rd Battalion combat ineffective.

In January 1970 John Paul Vann at the request of Ambassador Ellsworth Bunker produced his own evaluations of IV Corps' commanders which differed markedly from the official judgments of MACV. Vann recommended all three division commanders and the special zone commander for relief, however only the 7th Division commander was replaced.

In 1970 IV Corps commander Nguyễn Viết Thanh withdrew the Division from its area security missions and began using it as the Corps' reaction force.

During 1971 the Division focused on destruction of People's Army of Vietnam (PAVN) and VC Base Area 400 in the That Son (Seven Mountains) region.

=== 1972–1974 ===
By the end of 1972 the Division was responsible for Sa Đéc, Vĩnh Long, Vĩnh Bình and Kien Hoa Provinces. The Division was opposed by only one main force regiment, the D3 under the command of VC Military Region 3. One of only two main force regiments in South Vietnam still considered to be predominantly VC the D3 Regiment was probably operating in southeastern Vinh Long.

During the Battle of An Lộc, on 15 May 1972 a task force of the 15th Regiment which was redeployed from the Mekong Delta to reinforce ARVN forces and the 9th Armored Cavalry Squadron, 21st Division moved north, east of Route 13 bypassing the PAVN 209th Regiment, 7th Division roadblock at Tau O (11.514°N 106.614°E) to establish a fire support base at Tan Khai (11.55°N 106.616°E) 10 km south of An Lộc. On 20 May the PAVN 141st Regiment attacked the base at Tan Khai and continued attacking unsuccessfully for 3 days against a determined defense before withdrawing.

With its 15th Regiment and the 21st Division engaged at An Lộc the remainder of the Division and the 7th Division and Regional and Popular Forces were left to defend against the PAVN/VC Easter Offensive in southern Cambodia and the Mekong Delta. While stretched thin these forces prevented the PAVN/VC from achieving their objectives in the Delta.

In March 1973 during the Battle of Hồng Ngự the PAVN concentrated the 174th and 207th Regiments, 6th Division, the 272nd Regiment (detached from the 9th Division) and elements of the 75th Artillery Group in Base Area 704 in Prey Veng Province, Cambodia northwest of Hồng Ngự. With the 207th leading, supported by artillery, the PAVN attacked from Base Area 704 towards Hồng Ngự in an attempt to cut the South Vietnamese supply convoys up the Mekong River into Cambodia. Not only did they meet immediate heavy resistance, but their rear area was pounded by USAF B-52's and tactical bombers. While US forces had disengaged from Vietnam on 28 January 1973 in accordance with the terms of the Paris Peace Accords, US military operations in Cambodia and Laos would continue until 15 August 1973 and the USAF was heavily engaged in support of the Khmer National Armed Forces campaign to clear the banks of the Mekong from the Vietnam border to Phnom Penh. One B-52 strike on 23 April 1973 north of the border between the Mekong and the Hồng Ngự stream caught a large portion of the attacking force with survivors reported seeing impressed civilians carrying the bodies or more than 100 PAVN from the area. In mid-April the 15th Infantry Regiment, the 2nd Armored Cavalry Squadron and a Regional Forces Group counterattacked against the PAVN. Although casualties were heavy, RVNAF and Navy support helped enable the ARVN troops to clear the east bank of the Mekong from Hồng Ngự to the Cambodian frontier. The attack inflicted heavy casualties on the PAVN and dealt a damaging blow to their morale. By the end of May, one battalion of the 207th Regiment had only 100 men.

In late 1973 Brigadier general Huynh Van Lac replaced Major general Tran Ba Di as commander of the Division. A reorganization of IV Corps drew all Rangers out of the Corps and eliminated the 44th Special Tactical Zone. This change required the Division to assume responsibility for Châu Đốc and northern Kiên Giang Provinces as well as Kien Phong Province. It turned over its two southern provinces of Vĩnh Long and Vĩnh Bình to the 7th Division, recovered its 14th Regiment, which had been under the operational control of the 7th Division, and released its 15th Regiment to the operational control of the 21st Division in Chuong Thien Province. Thus with two infantry regiments, General Lac replaced the equivalent of three Ranger regiments in the northern districts of the border provinces. It was feasible only because the enemy main force in the area had been so severely damaged in the Battle of Hồng Ngự.

From 15 February to 14 May 1974 the 14th Regiment and one battalion from the 16th Regiment together with units from the 7th Division participated in the Battle of Tri Phap attacking a PAVN base area in Định Tường province before PAVN forces arrived there.

In April 1974 during the Battle of Svay Rieng the 15th Infantry formed a task force with part of the 16th Armored Cavalry Squadron under the control of the 7th Division which, together with a 7th Division task force conducted a sweep of the Elephant's Foot (10.87°N 105.9°E) area of Cambodia. In 12 days of fighting in the border area, these two mobile task forces killed 850 PAVN soldiers, captured 31, collected over 100 weapons, and suffered fewer than 300 casualties, including 39 killed.

== Organisation ==
Component units:

- 14th Infantry Regiment
- 15th Infantry Regiment
- 16th Infantry Regiment
- 90th, 91st, 92nd and 93rd Artillery Battalions
- 2nd Armored Cavalry Squadron
- US Advisory Team 60
