= Operation Truong Cong Dinh =

Part of the Vietnam War (1968)

- Part of Vietnam War
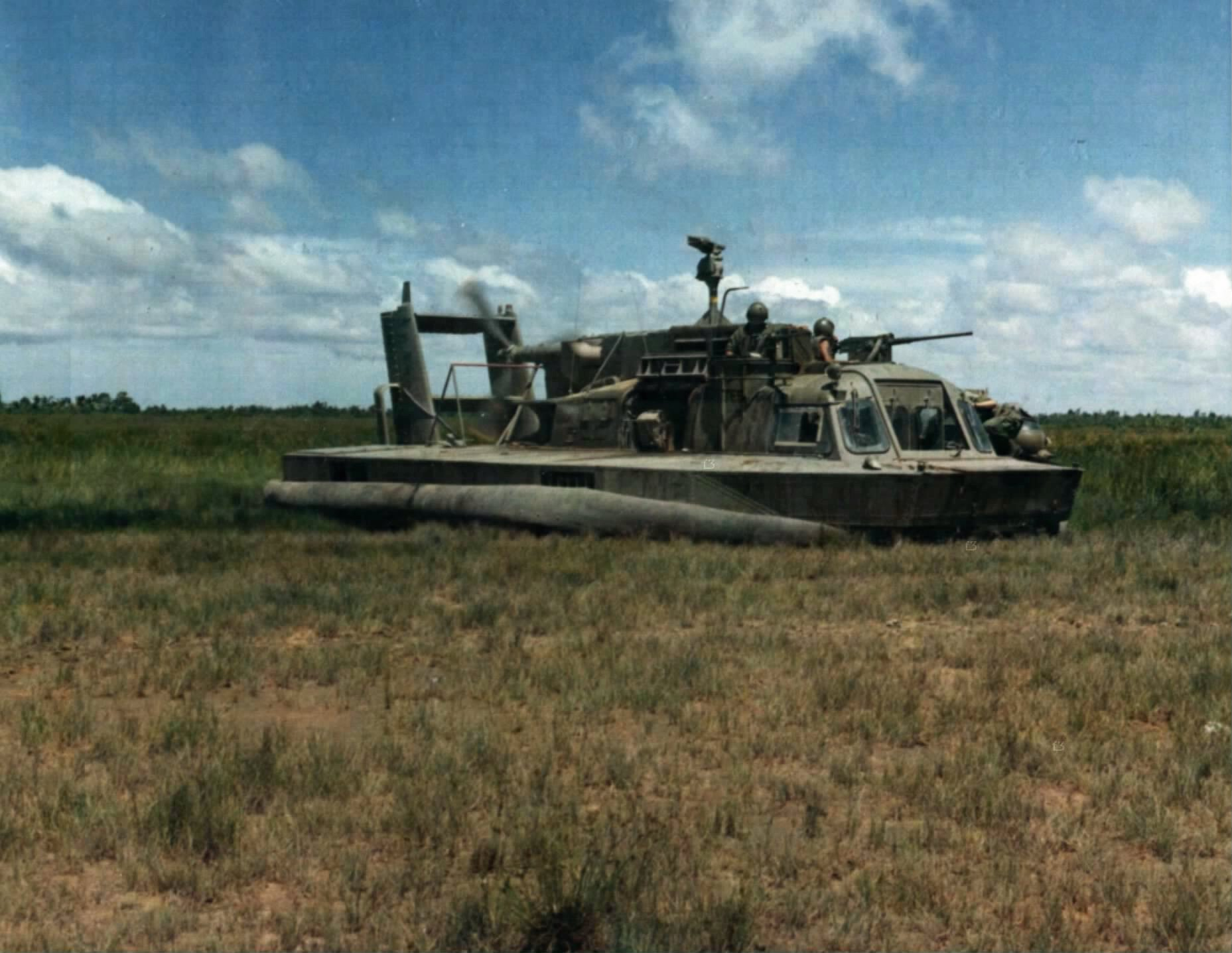
- An Assault Air-Cushion Vehicle during the operation, 30 June 1968
Date	7 March – 7 August 1968
Location	Around Mỹ Tho, South Vietnam (now Tiền Giang Province, Vietnam)
Result	Allied operational success

Belligerents
United States; South Vietnam	(Provisional Revolutionary Government of the Republic of South Vietnam) Viet Cong

Commanders and leaders
(United States) MG Julian Ewell (South Vietnam) Nguyễn Viết Thanh	

Units involved
(United States) 1st and 2nd Brigades, 9th Infantry Division; Mobile Riverine Force; (South Vietnam) 7th Division	

Casualties and losses
(United States) 51 killed	US body count: 343 killed

Operation Truong Cong Dinh (also known as Operation People's Road), was a United States and Army of the Republic of Vietnam (ARVN) security operation to reestablish South Vietnamese control over the northern Mekong Delta in the aftermath of the Tet Offensive. The operation aimed to root out Viet Cong (VC) forces in the area, and to stop them from attacking traffic on the nearby Highway 4.

The operation started on 7 March 1968 and lasted until August 1968, involving the 1st and 2nd brigades of the US 9th Infantry Division and the ARVN 7th Division backed by South Vietnamese Regional Forces. Operations were supported by an American artillery battalion, which established a fire support base on the north bank of the Mỹ Tho River and the Mobile Riverine Force (MRF) which conducted a series of riverine and airmobile operations.

== Background ==
Trương Định was a 19th-century mandarin who served under Emperor Tự Đức of the Nguyễn dynasty and operated in the Mekong Delta. He gained fame after the initial French invasion of southern Vietnam in the late 1850s for leading nationalist resistance fighters and was well known for his guerrilla attacks on French units along the waterways of the Mekong Delta. In 1862, faced with serious internal rebellions in other parts of the country, Tự Đức decided to cede three southern provinces to become the French colony of Cochinchina so that he could focus on putting down internal revolts. Trương became more iconic after this for his condemnation of the cession and his defiance of the emperor in continuing to fight.

During the Tet Offensive, ARVN and Regional and Popular Force units responsible for security in the Delta had been called into the regions towns and cities to repulse VC attacks. Following their defeat in the Tet Offensive, most VC Battalions split into smaller groups to evade detection. In addition to keeping the remaining VC away from the town and cities, the Allied forces sought to reestablish South Vietnamese control over villages that had been occupied by the VC during Tet and extend their reach into areas long-held by the VC. The 1st Brigade, 9th Infantry Division was reconfigured as light infantry for closer operations with the MRF and the 7th Squadron, 17th Cavalry Regiment moved from III Corps to IV Corps to provide additional aerial support.

The objective of Operation Truong Cong Dinh was to destroy communist forces in Dinh Tuong Province (the province surrounding the regional delta centre of Mỹ Tho) and to reduce the communist threat west of Mỹ Tho, which focused on harassing traffic on Highway 4.

== Operation ==
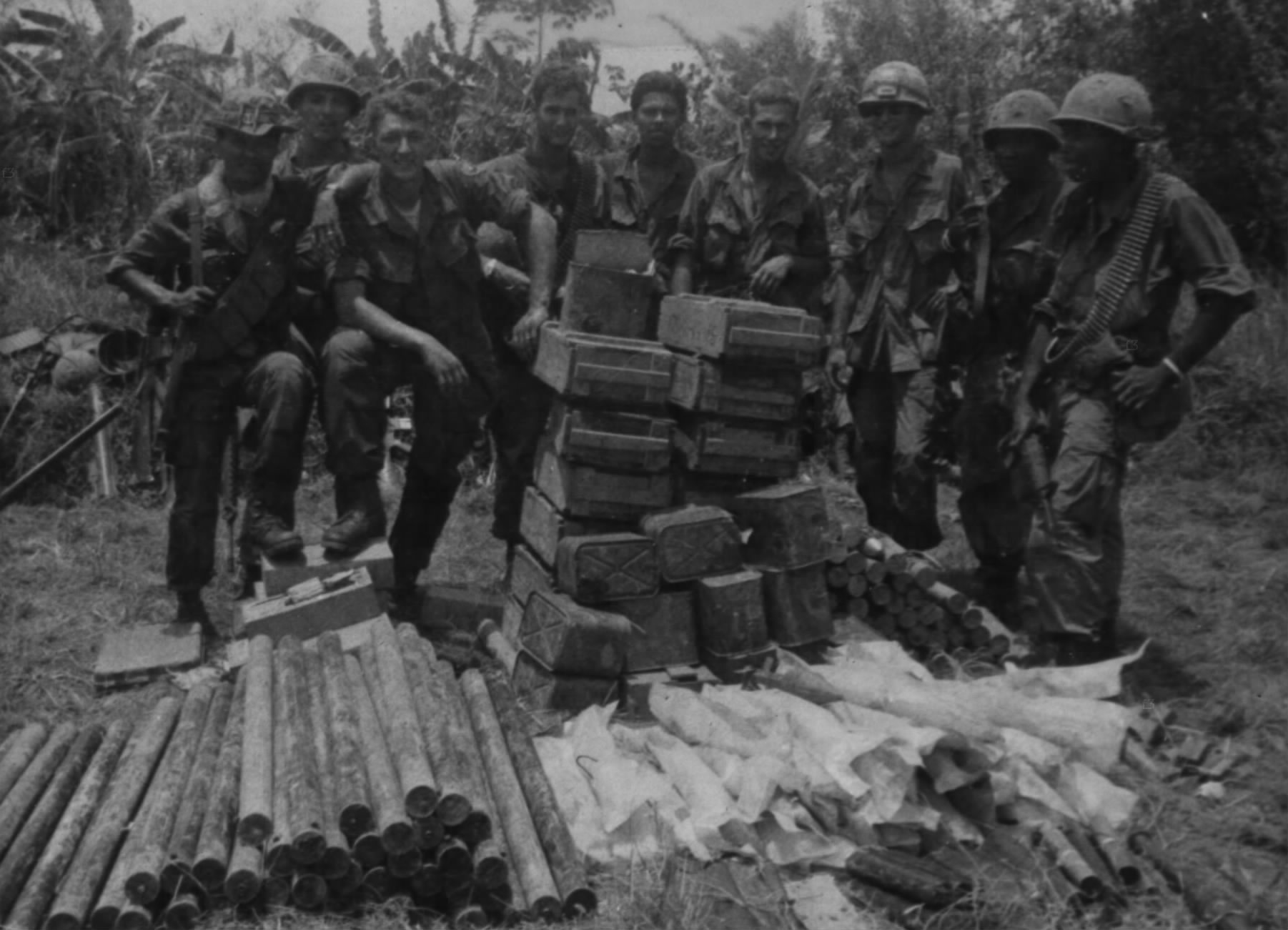
Men of Company "C", 2nd Battalion, 60th Infantry, display enemy equipment captured northwest of My Tho, 8 April 1968

The operation started on 7 March 1968, and involved elements of the 1st and 2nd Brigades of the U.S. 9th Infantry Division and the ARVN 7th Division, backed by Regional Forces. This was the first time that the commanding general of the 9th Infantry Division was able to use the 2nd Brigade in a continuing co-ordinated role with another brigade. The Mobile Riverine Force conducted a series of combined riverine and airmobile operations, beginning east of Mỹ Tho. Operations were supported by the 3rd Battalion, 34th Artillery of the US, which established a fire support base on the north bank of the Mỹ Tho River, 16 km east of the city.

During initial airmobile assaults on 7 March, VC resistance was light and no major firefight resulted. During the afternoon, the two battalions shifted their area of operations west-northwest of Mỹ Tho in response to intelligence reports. At 19:20 the U.S. 4th Battalion, 47th Infantry came under heavy small arms and automatic weapons fire just west of Mỹ Tho. This continued until 22:25. The following day Allied troops met no VC in the area; in response to new intelligence the two battalions moved again at noon into the area of operations of early 7 March. There were several firefights during the rest of the day. The most significant occurred at 17:15 when Company B, 4/47th Infantry, made an assault landing by helicopter and was fired upon by a VC force from well entrenched positions along the southern edge of the landing zone. Five helicopters were brought down during the first landing. Throughout the evening and into the night, as other elements of the two battalions maneuvered in support of Company B, there was sporadically heavy fighting in the area. At 03:00 the fire support base was attacked by mortars, sinking two artillery barges carrying four 105-mm howitzers. The 4/47th Infantry continued their sweep of the previous day's battlefield without finding any VC and returned by Armored Troop Carriers (ATC) to the Mobile Riverine Base at Đồng Tâm in the late afternoon.

On March 10 the MRF shifted operations to near the towns of Cai Lậy and Long Dinh in Dinh Tuong Province. Troops of the 1st and 2nd Brigades, of the 9th US Infantry Division, conducted day and night patrolling and reconnaissance against suspected VC locations along Highway 4 until March 16, when the 1st Brigade was withdrawn. On March 18, boats of US River Division 92 received heavy automatic weapons and rocket fire from the VC while patrolling west of Dong Tam. The rockets damaged several assault support patrol boats and one monitor. The operation continued without opposition the next day, and the infantry battalions returned by ATC to the Mobile Riverine Base near Dong Tam.

On 22 March the MRF floating base, still located in the Mỹ Tho River south of Dong Tam, was attacked at 03:20 by communist forces using mortars and recoilless rifles. The USS Benewah received two 75-mm recoilless rifle hits that caused minor damage, and near misses were registered by VC mortars on a landing ship tank, the USS Washtenaw County.

For the rest of March the MRF continued operations in Dinh Tuong Province with occasional light to moderate firefights. On 1 April the U.S. 3rd Battalion, 60th Infantry Regiment left and assumed the Dong Tam security mission and was replaced in the MRF by the 3/47th Infantry.

In late March and early April the 4/47th Infantry and 3/60th Infantry ranged across the northern Delta locating and destroying numerous bunkers but killing only small numbers of VC who appeared to have withdrawn into base areas in western Dinh Tuong Province. By 2 April VC losses in the operation were 150 killed and 14 captured.

In mid-April, the 3rd and 4th Battalions, 47th Infantry Regiment moved into northern Kien Hoa Province to sweep the area around Bến Tre. The VC generally avoided combat unless cornered, but on 17 April the two battalions killed 90 VC while losing five U.S. soldiers. At the end of April, the US claimed 343 VC had been killed in the operation while U.S. losses were 51 killed.

During the operation, the MRF used extensively a riverine assault reconnaissance element, a small unit first employed in December 1967 that consisted of three or four monitors and several assault support patrol boats. The riverine assault reconnaissance element led ATC convoys and employed reconnaissance by fire against likely VC ambush positions. According to the U.S. military, the technique reduced casualties because of the firepower and mobility of the craft in the riverine assault reconnaissance element and the placement of ATCs carrying infantry in the rear of the column. Airmobility was used during the operation to increase the flexibility of the MRF by providing increased intelligence, firepower, and escort coverage for convoys during troop movement.

== Aftermath ==
The operation was regarded as a success because the VC no longer threatened the towns and cities and had been pushed back into their sanctuaries, allowing the South Vietnamese to re-establish control over the countryside and begin pacification and reconstruction.

The operation continued until August when it was succeeded by Operation Quyet Chien.
