= Operation Kien Giang 9-1 =

Part of the Vietnam War (1967)

- Part of the Vietnam War
Date	15–19 November 1967
Location	Dinh Tuong Province, South Vietnam
Result	U.S./ARVN claims operational success

Belligerents
United States; South Vietnam	Viet Cong

Commanders and leaders
(United States) Col. George W. Everett	

Units involved
(United States) Mobile Riverine Force (United States) 3rd Brigade, 9th Infantry Division (South Vietnam) 7th Division (South Vietnam) 9th Division	263rd Battalion

Casualties and losses
39+ killed	183+ killed 33 captured

Operation Kien Giang 9-1 was a joint U.S. and Army of the Republic of Vietnam (ARVN) operation of the Vietnam War in Dinh Tuong Province, South Vietnam, from 16 to 19 November 1967.

== Background ==
In early November 1967, the ARVN IV Corps commander General Nguyễn Văn Mạnh requested II Field Force commander General Frederick C. Weyand to assist the ARVN 7th and 9th Divisions in a sweep of the Vietcong (VC) Base Area 470 in western Dinh Tuong Province. Weyand assigned the Mobile Riverine Force and elements of the 3rd Brigade, 9th Infantry Division to the operation.

== Operation ==
On the morning of 15 November three companies of the 3rd Battalion, 47th Infantry Regiment, were lifted by helicopters into the southern part of the Kien Giang zone to secure a firebase. The companies established Firebase Cudgel (10.4198°N 105.991°E) in swampy rice paddy at the intersection of the So Bay Canal and the Ong Tai Creek. At 09:00 CH–47s delivered Battery C, 2nd Battalion, 4th Artillery Regiment and experimental firing platforms for each of the six 105 mm howitzers into Cudgel. Battery D was also airlifted in later that day.

Company A, 2nd Battalion, 60th Infantry Regiment was landed in the northern part of the Kien Giang zone, capturing one VC. Meanwhile, Company B 3rd Battalion, 39th Infantry Regiment and the battalion's reconnaissance platoon came under heavy fire from a VC company around midday, losing two killed before the VC withdrew. Company C, 2/60th Infantry and Battery B, 2/4th Artillery were then landed by helicopter to establish Firebase Mace (10.504°N 105.973°E).

On the morning of 16 November, three battalions from the ARVN 7th Infantry Division were landed by helicopter along the Ton Duc Loc Canal, the northern boundary of the Kien Giang zone and began sweeping south with artillery support from Firebases Cudgel and Mace. Six CIDG companies secured the north of the Kien Giang zone, while elements of the ARVN 9th Infantry Division secured the western side of the zone.

At 22:00 on 16 November several VC companies attacked Firebase Mace from the east and west. The attack continued for several hours before the VC withdrew leaving no bodies behind, while six Americans were killed.

On 17 November, the 3/47th Infantry, swept north from Firebase Cudgel, while 5th Battalion, 60th Infantry (Mechanized), maneuvered south from Mace. 3/47th Infantry returned to Cudgel that afternoon and was then flown back to Đồng Tâm Base Camp, ending its role in the operation and 5/60th Infantry took over responsibility for Firebase Cudgel.

=== Firebase Cudgel ===
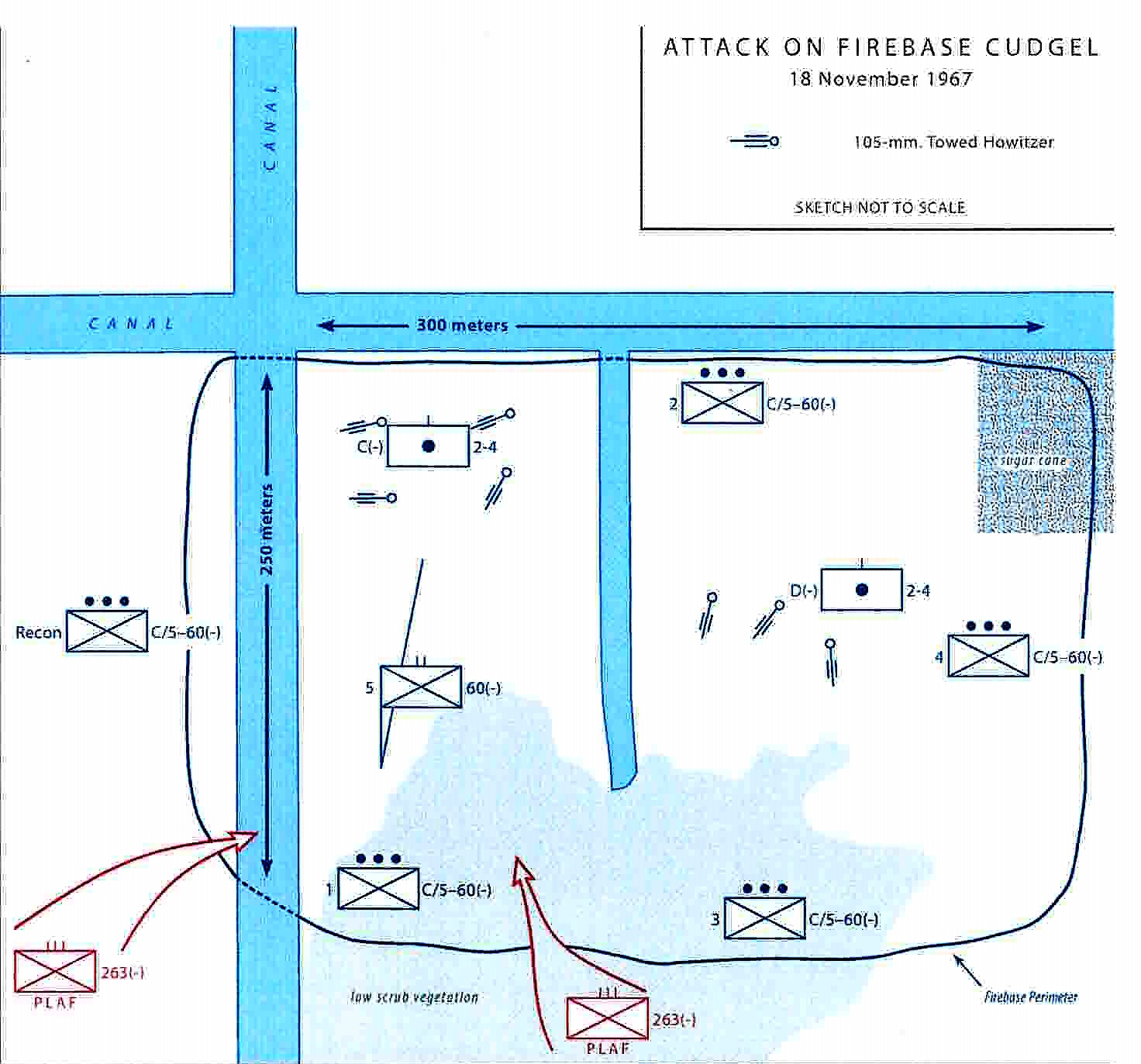
Attack on Firebase Cudgel, 19 November 1967

The 5/60th Infantry commander Lieutenant Colonel William B. Steele deployed two of his companies in the paddyfields to the north and east of Cudgel with Company C at the firebase to protect Batteries C and D 2/4th Artillery and his reconnaissance platoon on the southern side of Ong Tai Creek accessible only by a narrow footbridge.

At 01:50 on 18 November the base was hit by mortar fire and a company from the VC 263rd Battalion attacked the reconnaissance platoon south of the Ong Tai Creek. The defenders detonated their claymore mines and engaged the VC but were gradually forced back to the creek. Some soldiers crossed the footbridge into Cudgel, others swam across the canal, while several wounded men hid themselves beside the creek. The VC set up several recoilless rifles and machine guns south of the creek to support their attack and the artillerymen from Battery C leveled their guns and started firing beehive and high-explosive rounds at the VC. VC recoilless rifle fire hit a howitzer from Battery C igniting the powder charges stored near the weapon and wounded the entire crew. PFC Sammy L. Davis regained consciousness and despite his wounds he loaded and aimed the howitzer eventually knocking out the VC recoilless rifle, after using up all the remaining rounds he then engaged the VC with his M16. Hearing one of the wounded Americans hiding on the south bank, he and PFC William H. Murray ferried three wounded Americans across the Ong Tai Creek on an air mattress. Davis then joined another gun crew for the remainder of the battle; for his actions PFC Davis was later awarded the Medal of Honor.

On the eastern perimeter several VC companies had avoided the defending U.S. company by approaching from the south and crossing the creek behind the company, and then moving west toward the Cudgel attacking the 1st and 3rd Platoons of Company C. Steele called for air support and at 02:15 helicopter gunships appeared overhead and proceeded to fire on the VC attacking from the east. At 02:45 an AC–47 Spooky gunship arrived on station and together with several F–100s they engaged the VC attacking from the south. The attack continued for another hour before the VC began to withdraw. On policing the battlefield in the morning only five VC dead were found, but it was estimated that more than 150 VC had been killed or wounded and their bodies removed. U.S. losses were seven dead and 98 wounded.

As the VC 263rd Battalion withdrew from Firebase Cudgel on the morning of 18 November, they were intercepted by the Mobile Riverine Force consisting of the South Vietnamese 5th Marine Battalion and elements of the 4/47th Infantry. In the battle that followed the VC lost 178 killed and 33 captured, while U.S./ARVN losses were 26 killed and 155 wounded.

== Aftermath ==
With the sweep of Base Area 470 completed and the VC 263rd Battalion rendered combat ineffective the 3rd Brigade was ordered to return to Đồng Tâm Base Camp.
