= Bùi Dzinh =

South Vietnamese general (1929–2024)

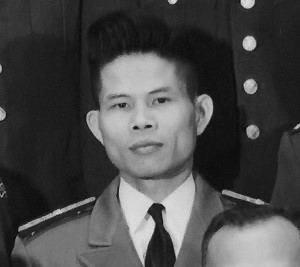
- Born: 1929; Xuân Hóa, Annam, French Indochina
- Died: January 2, 2024 (aged 94–95) France
- Allegiance: State of Vietnam; Republic of Vietnam
- Branch: Vietnamese National Army; Army of the Republic of Vietnam
- Service years: 1951–1963
- Rank: Colonel
- Commands: 9th Infantry Division
- Conflicts: Vietnam War; 1963 South Vietnamese coup d'état; September 1964 South Vietnamese coup attempt; 1965 South Vietnamese coup
- Education: Vietnamese National Military Academy

Bùi Dzinh (1929 – January 2, 2024) was a South Vietnamese military commander.

== Early life ==
Bùi Dzinh was born in 1929 in the village of Xuân Hoá in the Lệ Thủy district of Vietnam's Quảng Bình Province. He attended the Vietnamese National Military Academy in Đà Lạt, graduating as valedictorian in 1951. He was then assigned to 21st Mobile Battalion. After attending a staff officer training course at the École Militaire in Paris, he served in the First Military Zone P.3 under Colonel Lê Văn Nghiêm.

== Vietnam War service ==
By the outbreak of the Vietnam War in 1955, he was commander of the Quảng Ngãi subregion of Quảng Nam Province. He continued to serve in the Army of the Republic of Vietnam, and was assigned as commander of various divisions in areas ranging from Buôn Ma Thuột in the Central Highlands to Biên Hòa, outside of Saigon.

== Dismissal from service ==
In 1963, following the military coup by Dương Văn Minh, Bùi Dzinh was dismissed from service. Dzinh had opposed the overthrow of Ngo Dinh Diem. Despite this, he continued to collaborate with his former superiors, Lâm Văn Phát and Phạm Ngọc Thảo in the organization of several coup attempts against the then military leader Nguyễn Khánh on 19 February 1965. For his involvement, Bui Dzinh was pursued and arrested in May 1965 near Saigon. He was found guilty on two counts, membership in the attempted coup and the use of illegal force, and was sentenced to life imprisonment in the Chí Hòa Prison. He remained there until his release on 1 July 1967 by order of the President's Committee.

After the Fall of Saigon in 1975, he was placed in a labor camp along with former South Vietnamese government and military officials, serving from 1976 to 1980. He was released, and escaped by sea border to refugee camps in Thailand in 1981, finally seeking asylum in France.

== Death ==
Bui died in France on January 2, 2024.
