= 7th Division (South Vietnam) =

7th Division (1959–1975) 4th Field Division (1955–1959)
- Sư đoàn 7
- 7th Division SSI
- Active: October 1955 – 1975
- Country: South Vietnam
- Branch: Army of the Republic of Vietnam
- Part of: IV Corps
- Garrison/HQ: Đồng Tâm
- Engagements: Vietnam War: 1960 South Vietnamese coup attempt; Battle of Ap Bac; 1963 South Vietnamese coup; Operation Coronado V; Operation Kien Giang 9-1; Operation Truong Cong Dinh; Battle of Tri Phap; Battle of Svay Rieng

Commanders
- Notable commanders: Huỳnh Văn Cao; Bùi Đình Đạm; Nguyễn Viết Thanh; Nguyễn Khoa Nam

Insignia
- Division flag

The Seventh Division was part of the Army of the Republic of Vietnam (ARVN), the army of the nation state of South Vietnam that existed from 1955 to 1975. It was part of the IV Corps, which oversaw the Mekong Delta region of the country.

== History ==
The Division was originally established as the 4th Field Division and redesignated as the 7th Infantry Division in 1959.

On 8 July 1959 a Viet Cong (VC) attack on a Division camp at Bien Hoa killed two U.S. advisers, Major Dale R. Buis and Master Sergeant Chester M. Ovnand, among the first Americans killed in the Vietnam War.

The division was based in Mỹ Tho, and due to the division's close proximity to the capital Saigon was a key factor in the success or failure of the various coup attempts in the nation's history. As a result, the loyalty of the commanding officer of the division was crucial in maintaining power. In the coup attempt of 1960, the loyalist Colonel Huỳnh Văn Cao used the Division to storm into Saigon to save President Ngô Đình Diệm.

In 1962, Diem decided to split the command of the area in the south around Saigon into two, the former III Corps area being reduced in size to cover the area northeast of Saigon, and the newly created IV Corps taking over the west and southwest. Cao was promoted to general and assumed command of the new IV Corps, which included the area of operations of his 7th Infantry Division. Command of the 7th was given to Cao's chief of staff, Colonel Bùi Đình Đạm.

The division scored the biggest successes of the military campaigns of 1962, along with the Civil Guard and Self Defense Corps, killing more than 2,000 VC fighters and leaving thousands of others cut off from supplies. However, South Vietnamese officers were often reluctant to absorb heavy casualties. On several occasions, Cao's forces were in an excellent position to trap and wipe out whole battalions of VC, but he would fail to close the trap on one pretext or another and allow the enemy to escape. This behavior initially mystified the division's US adviser Lieutenant colonel John Paul Vann, who directed much of the unit's activity, who was attempting to build Cao into an aggressive commander. Unknown to Vann, Diem would reprimand or demote any officer who lost too many men, no matter how successful the operation. Diem was more interested in using the military to protect his regime than to take on the VC. His solution was to fill the ARVN with Catholic political cronies and friends like Cao, Lê Quang Tung and Tôn Thất Đính, who had little military ability, but were very likely to help stop a coup attempt. After a skirmish on a highway that resulted in a small number of South Vietnamese casualties along with several trucks destroyed, Cao was called to Saigon and reprimanded by Diem. Upon his return, Vann and his group of advisers were forced to end the joint planning sessions that had been so successful earlier, and action essentially wound down in their region. Cao used the excellent military intelligence network they had developed to find areas devoid of VC, and planned operations only in those areas. In many other cases, operations were executed on paper only, in order to report an increasing tempo of operations that did not actually exist.

On 2 January 1963 the Division's 11th Regiment took part in the Battle of Ap Bac, a disastrous operation to trap a small VC force.

In the successful coup of November 1963, the plotters managed to have the division transferred temporarily to III Corps, with Diem unaware that III Corps commander Tôn Thất Đính was with the rebels. Đính then placed a rebel subordinate in command of the Division, preventing the rest of Cao's IV Corps from saving Diem.

=== 1964 ===
On 4 February the VC 504th Battalion and elements of the 261st Battalion successfully attacked the understrength 2nd Battalion, 12th Infantry, at Phú Mỹ. The VC killed 13 ARVN, wounded 25, and captured two 81mm mortars, 19 firearms, and six radios. The VC left behind six dead and two weapons. The VC also destroyed the homes of 300 people.

On 21 June elements of the division and the 9th Division massed eight battalions - five infantry, two airborne, and one Civil Guard, a battery of 105mm howitzers and two platoons of 155mm howitzers to encircle an area 15km in diameter centered on the village of My Thien in western Định Tường province. Inside were an estimated 1,000 VC regulars of the 261st, the 502nd, and 514th Battalions, plus two additional companies. The operation began inauspiciously when a Republic of Vietnam Air Force (RVNAF) A-1H fighter-bomber mistakenly attacked the 2nd Battalion, 15th Infantry, causing nine casualties. The major fighting started in the afternoon as the 3rd Airborne Battalion approached the hamlet of Bang Lang. The unit commander decided not to wait for artillery support and led his men in a bayonet charge across 137 meters of muddy paddy into the teeth of entrenched VC machine guns. The battle raged until dark, with fixed-wing aircraft conducting 14 strikes. VC gunners downed four US helicopters. The VC successfully eluded capture that night and two additional days of searching achieved little. The South Vietnamese lost 29 dead and 85 wounded, VC dead numbered almost 100.

On 10 July the division and the 5th Division launched an operation to clear two VC battalions from the heavily forested border of Hau Nghia and Long An provinces. The 5th Division thrust southward from Duc Hoa along the Vàm Cỏ Đông River, while the division drove north from Bến Lức. The object was to trap and destroy the VC between them. Late in the day, the two VC battalions pinned the 30th Ranger Battalion against the banks of the Varic Oriental River. The Rangers received air support throughout the night and at 06:30 on 11 July, 24 US Army helicopters delivered an infantry battalion, but the VC already had withdrawn. ARVN losses were nine killed and 27 wounded, US losses were two killed and three wounded. The allies killed 68 VC and captured 73 suspects.

On 20 August the VC overran Phu Tuc post in Kiến Hòa Province killing seven, wounding 15, and capturing the rest of the post's 36-man garrison and burning the post. An ARVN reaction force comprising 360 soldiers from the 41st Ranger Battalion and the 3rd Battalion, 12th Infantry arrived too late. As they withdrew, the VC 514th Battalion attacked the column repeatedly for an hour. ARVN losses were 85 killed, 60 wounded, 91 missing and 122 weapons lost. All four American advisers were killed. Westmoreland was dismayed because no local South Vietnamese had informed the ARVN that the VC were setting up the ambush.

On 22 August seven ARVN battalions, two armored cavalry troops, and naval forces tried to encircle the VC in Kien Hoa province's Ham Long District. In the ensuing battle, division artillery fired 3,222 rounds, and the RVNAF flew 10 fighter-bomber sorties. The allies killed 98 VC and captured 43 prisoners and 37 weapons. Agents reported that the VC buried another 200 dead and evacuated 300 wounded. ARVN losses were 17 killed and 45 wounded.

In September Brigadier general Nguyễn Bảo Trị became the division commander.

On 5 September the Joint General Staff (JGS) abolished the Tien Giang Tactical Area. It transferred the 7th Division and four of the five provinces it supervised to IV Corps and assigned Long An province to III Corps. On the same day during a division operation in Dinh Tuong province, entrenched VC hit three of five UH–1B gunships from the 120th Aviation Company. The gunships in turn killed 60 VC and wounded an estimated 40 more, while 34 VC surrendered.

In the early morning hours of 13 September, Colonel Lý Tòng Bá, the head of the division's armored section to march on Saigon in an attempted coup. They seized Saigon without a fight, but failed to capture premier Nguyễn Khánh, who fled to Da Lat. Air Vice Marshal Nguyen Cao Ky, however, sent his planes into the skies above Saigon, threatening to strike the plotters if they did not back down. The coup leaders General Lâm Văn Phát and Dương Văn Đức ordered Ba to attack Tan Son Nhut Air Base with his armored squadron, but Ba telephoned MACV headquarters instead to learn what America thought about the coup. When he found that MACV opposed the rebellion, he called off the assault. The coup collapsed the following day and the division was purged by Khánh.

On 19 November the division encircled the VC 514th and 267th Battalions near the hamlet of Ba Dua, 7km south of Cai Lay town. The attack started well, but the advance bogged down among deep canals bordered by fortified embankments from which the VC fought until escaping the cordon at night. ARVN losses were eight killed and 38 wounded. The allies reportedly killed 106 VC and estimated that the VC had evacuated another 20 to 30 dead. The ARVN also took 55 prisoners, 18 suspects, and a handful of weapons.

On 27 November the division surrounded a VC force in a flooded rice paddy near Chợ Gạo. After an all-day battle, the ARVN lost eight killed and 19 wounded, and the VC lost 46 dead, seven prisoners, and 14 weapons, with the VC carrying off many more casualties.

On 11 December the VC 261st Battalion attacked Ba Dua hamlet which was defended by the 1st Battalion, 11th Infantry, and the division reconnaissance company. The VC penetrated the hamlet and airburst artillery fire was called in on the hamlet, following which the ARVN counterattacked. ARVN losses were 12 dead and 19 wounded. The VC left 15 dead and it was estimated that they had suffered a further 50 casualties.

On 27 December a VC battalion overran the 21-man garrison of Quoi Thanh post and the neighboring district town of Ham Long in Kien Hoa province. The division sent in a relief force. At 15:00, the 3rd Battalion, 10th Infantry walked into an L-shaped ambush in a palm forest. The battalion formed a defensive perimeter and awaited reinforcements, but was unable to be relieved until after the VC withdrew that night. The ARVN lost 52 killed, 36 wounded, and 31 missing along with 58 weapons. The allies captured tow VC and estimated VC casualties at 100.

=== 1965 ===
On 21 January the division attacked a VC force massing in Ba Tri district, Kien Hoa Province. An armored cavalry troop, an airborne battalion, and a ranger battalion advanced in line abreast northeast out of Ba Tri toward the village of Tan Xuan. A second armored cavalry troop and several infantry companies stood in reserve. After a bombardment by Vietnamese aircraft and artillery, US helicopters landed an infantry battalion to two landing zones northeast and northwest of Tan Xuan. As the troops swept toward the blocking forces at the landing zones, they had multiple contacts with the VC. When the VC fell back to prepared positions, air and artillery fire assisted M113 armored personnel carriers and soldiers in overrunning them. The attack continued until dark. The VC lost 50 killed, 61 captured and 58 suspects along with two 60mm mortars and 33 individual weapons. The prisoners revealed that the allies had caused 350 casualties. ARVN losses were seven dead and 20 wounded. The VC shot down two helicopters, one of which was destroyed.

On 26 January in response to reports of VC recruiting parties on the edge of the Plain of Reeds, the division launched an operation against the hamlet of Ap Bac. Two companies of the 512th Battalion and one of the 261st Battalion along with several hundred recruits were encircled by rangers, airborne, infantry and mechanized forces in the hamlet of Thanh Thoi northwest of Ap Bac. The fighting continued until dusk as the VC broke down into small groups to escape. The ARVN remained on the field overnight, but by dawn of the 27th, the VC were gone. VC losses were 152 dead, three captured and three recoilless rifles, a light machine gun, and 21 individual weapons captured. Prisoner interrogations led the allies to conclude that the VC had carried off another 167 dead and 70 wounded. ARVN losses were 18 dead and 67 wounded, with one M113 destroyed. US losses were two wounded and one destroyed helicopter.

On 21 March the division launched Operation Tien Giang 10/65 in Kien Hoa province, 40km southeast of My Tho. ARVN forces encircled a VC company in Tan Xuan village. The VC attempted to escape in small detachments rather than fight. One squad surrendered after the ARVN killed its leader. VC losses were 30 killed, including the company commander, 25 captured, 13 suspects detained and 17 weapons captured. ARVN losses were four wounded.

On 27 May the division massed a ranger and four infantry battalions, two reconnaissance companies, a mechanized troop, and a territorial company against two VC main force and one local force companies in northeast Phong Dinh province. In the fight that followed, the ARVN killed 40 VC and captured 30 suspects, three firearms, and a .50-caliber machine gun. ARVN losses were ten dead and 32 wounded.

On 3 June the division hunted the headquarters of the Dong Thap 1 Regiment in Cái Bè district in western Dinh Tuong province. Seven infantry battalions, three reconnaissance companies, three Regional Forces companies, and some M113s faced off against six VC main force companies. VC losses were 52 killed, four prisoners, nine firearms, and four antiaircraft machine guns captured. The allies estimated the VC evacuated another 200 casualties. ARVN losses were 12 dead and 51 wounded.

On 27 June the division attacked a meeting of the VC's Dinh Tuong province leadership at Xom Dao. Forewarned of the attack, the VC 514th Battalion and part of the 261st Battalion met the attack. While airstrikes hit the tree lines and canal banks that normally housed entrenchments, the VC instead had deployed in foxholes in the rice fields. The VC repulsed two attacks in fighting that lasted all day. The ARVN destroyed a 50-bed hospital, killed 31 VC, and estimated the VC had evacuated another 50 casualties. They also killed the entire seven-man Communist provincial committee and captured 29 VC and 16 weapons. ARVN losses were one dead and two wounded. Liberation Radio claimed the VC had won the battle, killing 300 South Vietnamese soldiers.

By the end of 1965 the US advisers to the division regarded division commander Colonel Nguyễn Viết Thanh as an aggressive commander who demanded "clear, correct and frank" reports from his subordinates and who had a "sound tactical sense of the war."

=== 1967 ===
In 1967 Civil Operations and Revolutionary Development Support (CORDS) advisers found the division's battalions charged with area security missions were more concerned with their own static defenses than with protecting nearby villages and hamlets or with chasing the local VC. Assessing General Thanh they found that "his personal cautiousness and reluctance to push the battalions [those in securing missions] into more offensive activities... difficult to understand," claiming that he discouraged the initiative and aggressiveness of his subordinates." CORDS chief Robert Komer agreed and in 1968 described Thanh as unaggressive, unimaginative, and "rather a xenophobe." All Komer's assistants noted worsening command and control problems at the lower tactical levels and a general confusion over the division's roles and missions. Tactical advisers, they reported, claimed that the army units contributed little more than their "presence" to local security; were idle most of the time; and, when aroused, were content with "merely chasing the VC and showing the flag." Despite all the revolutionary development training, the regular troops were also back in the old "chicken-stealing business," foraging for food and living off the local peasantry."

From 12 September to 7 October 1967 the division participated in Operation Coronado V with the US Mobile Riverine Force (MRF) against the VC 263rd Battalion in Định Tường and Kiến Hòa provinces. The division lost six killed, while the VC lost 163 killed.

From 15–19 November 1967 the division participated in Operation Kien Giang 9-1 with the ARVN 9th Division and the 5th Marine Battalion and the MRF against the VC 263rd Battalion's Base Area 470 in western Định Tường Province. The operation rendered the 263rd Battalion combat ineffective.

From 7 March to 7 August 1968 the division participated in Operation Truong Cong Dinh with the MRF to reestablish South Vietnamese control over the northern Mekong Delta in the aftermath of the Tet Offensive. The operation killed 343 VC.

Following the withdrawal of the US 9th Infantry Division from South Vietnam in July 1969, MACV reported that the division's performance had gone steadily downhill. At the time, five of its twelve infantry battalions were under the direct control of various province chiefs, and most of the remainder were scattered about performing static security missions. As these troops hastily occupied the evacuated American facilities at Đồng Tâm Base Camp and elsewhere, they had little opportunity to familiarize themselves with the local enemy and terrain. Because of delays in the formation of new territorial units, the Corps' commander also continued to hold the division responsible for its existing area security missions. Thus, despite additional aviation support and the rapid activation of 34 new RF companies, the division was spread extremely thin, and its offensive capability dropped accordingly. President Nguyễn Văn Thiệu and III Corps commander General Thanh, tried to rectify the situation in January 1970 by sending Colonel Nguyễn Khoa Nam, an Airborne brigade commander, to head the division. Nam had earned a good military reputation in the airborne force and was credited with making remarkable progress with the division. Fortunately for the South Vietnamese, PAVN/VC activity remained low in the Delta during late 1969 and 1970, as it did throughout South Vietnam, and the ineffectiveness of the division had no immediate repercussions. US Corps-level advisers believed that its shortcomings could be easily remedied or, at least for the time being, balanced by the increasing mobility of the neighboring 9th Division, which Thanh had withdrawn from its area security missions and began using it as the Corps' reaction force.

During 1971 the division and territorial forces focused on destruction of PAVN and VC Base Base Area 470 on the boundary of Định Tường and Kien Phong Provinces.

During the Easter Offensive in southern Cambodia and the Mekong Delta the division conducted operations against PAVN units in the Elephant's Foot (10.87°N 105.9°E) area of Cambodia before returning the South Vietnam to counter PAVN/VC attempts to cut Route QL- which connected the Delta ricebowl to Saigon.

By the end of 1972, the division, with headquarters at Đồng Tâm near My Tho, was responsible for Kien Phong, Kien Tuong, Định Tường and Go Cong Provinces. A major problem facing the division was security in densely populated Định Tường Province which was the key to control of National Highway 4 (now National Highway 1A), the important line of communication leading to Saigon and it contained the major city of My Tho. It was also the focus of two major enemy infiltration corridors from Cambodia. One, Corridor 1A generally paralleled the boundary between Kien Phong and Kien Tuong Provinces into the key PAVN/VC base, the Tri Phap, at the junction of Kien Phong, Kien Tuong, and Dinh Tuong provinces. The other, Corridor 1B, came out of Cambodia's Svay Rieng Province and entered Định Tường Province and the Tri Phap through the Plain of Reeds in Kien Tuong Province. Two enemy divisions opposed the division. The PAVN 5th Division with three regiments: the 275th, the 174th and the E6, had fought in the Easter Offensive campaign in the Binh Long battles of April through June 1972, then moved to the Mekong Delta and campaigned in Kien Tuong, Kien Phong and Định Tường Provinces. The 6th Division was in central Dinh Tuong, its 24th Regiment was probably located east of My Tho close to the border of Go Cong Province; the 207th Regiment was in northern Kien Phong Province; and the 320th Regiment, which was probably operating as part of the 6th Division, was in southern Kien Phong. The division, with an attached regiment of the 9th Division, had to cope with two independent regiments: the 88th and the DTI, controlled by VC Military Region 2. Although the division had secured the line of communication to Saigon and the enemy's actions were limited to attacks by fire against outposts and populated areas, it had an imposing assignment.

By late 1973 the division, under the command of Major general Nam, had become particularly skillful in rapid deployment, netting significant catches along the infiltration corridors. As the year drew to a close however, severe rationing of fuel, imposed to compensate for spiraling costs, drastically limited the Division's mobility. The permanent withdrawal of RF and PF from exposed positions balanced this disadvantage somewhat, in that Nam less frequently had to dispatch troops in what were often futile but costly attempts to rescue besieged outposts; he could select areas of deployment more likely to result in combat with major units or large infiltrating groups. Employing advantages of surprise, superior mobility and firepower, including effective coordination with the RVNAF, the division was usually the clear winner in that kind of encounter. At the end of the year the division assumed responsibility for Vĩnh Long and Vĩnh Bình Provinces from the 9th Division and returned the 14th Regiment to the 9th Division.

=== 1974 ===
From 12 February to 14 May 1974 the 12th Regiment and two battalions from the 10th Regiment together with units from the 9th Division participated in the Battle of Tri Phap attacking a PAVN base area in Định Tường Province before PAVN forces arrived there.

In April 1974 during the Battle of Svay Rieng the division moved a forward command post into Mộc Hóa and was controlling the operation of two task forces then committed in the Elephant's Foot area of Cambodia. One was composed of the 15th Infantry, 9th Division and part of the 16th Armored Cavalry Squadron; the other included the 10th Infantry and elements of the 6th Armored Cavalry Squadron, in 12 days of fighting in the border area, these two mobile task forces killed 850 PAVN soldiers, captured 31, collected over 100 weapons, and suffered fewer than 300 casualties, including 39 killed.

=== 1975 ===
On 9 April 1975 the PAVN 5th Division moved down from Svay Rieng Province into Long An province attacking near Tân An with its 275th Regiment. The Long An territorials fought well and were reinforced from IV Corps by the 12th Regiment. Against light losses, the 2nd Battalion, 12th Regiment, killed over 100 soldiers of the 275th Regiment, forcing its commander to ask for reinforcement. The next day, the PAVN attacked the Can Dot airfield (10.543°N 106.392°E) in Tân An and, after closing Highway 4, were driven off with heavy losses by Long An territorials. In two subsequent days of heavy fighting, the three Long An battalions, the 301st, 322nd and 330th, accounted for over 120 PAVN killed and 2 captured. Meanwhile, the 12th Regiment, fighting two regiments of the PAVN 5th Division, killed over 350 and captured 16.

During the final weeks of April VC units tried to interdict sections of Highway 4, but division forces repulsed these attacks. No attacks were launched on any district towns or provincial capitals in Dinh Tuong and other Mekong provinces. On 30 April 1975 as South Vietnamese President Duong Van Minh surrendered to the North Vietnamese, the division's units started to disintegrate, however in Cai Lay and My Tho, some units continued resistance until the morning of 1 May. Nam and his deputy commander, Lê Văn Hưng, committed suicide separately on 30 April and 1 May while Brigadier general Tran Van Hai committed suicide at Dong Tam Base on 30 April.

== Organisation ==
Component units:

- 10th Infantry Regiment
- 11th Infantry Regiment
- 12th Infantry Regiment
- 70th, 71st, 72nd and 73rd Artillery Battalions
- 6th Armored Cavalry Squadron
- US Advisory Team 75
