= Nguyễn Bảo Trị =

South Vietnamese military officer (1929–2024)

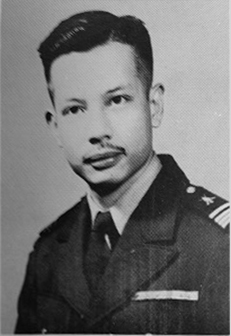
- Born: January 26, 1929; Hanoi, Tonkin, Nguyen dynasty
- Died: January 8, 2024 (aged 94) Huntington Beach, California, U.S.
- Allegiance: State of Vietnam; South Vietnam
- Branch: Vietnamese National Army; Army of the Republic of Vietnam
- Service years: 1951–1975
- Rank: Lieutenant General (Trung Tướng)
- Conflicts: First Indochina War; Vietnam War
- Children: 5

Lieutenant general Nguyễn Bảo Trị (January 26, 1929 – January 8, 2024) was an officer of the Army of the Republic of Vietnam.

== Biography ==
In September 1964 he became commander of the 7th Division.

Nguyen served as the commander of III Corps, which oversaw the region of the country surrounding the capital Saigon, from 1 October 1965 until 9 June of the next year, when he was replaced by Lieutenant General Le Nguyen Khang.

Nguyen died in Huntington Beach, California on January 8, 2024, at the age of 94.
