= Battle of Hồng Ngự =

Part of the Vietnam War (1973)

- Part of the Vietnam War
| Date | March – 4 May 1973 |
| Location | Hồng Ngự, South Vietnam |
| Result | US and South Vietnamese victory |

Belligerents
| North Vietnam | South Vietnam; United States |

Casualties and losses
| ARVN body count: 422 killed | (South Vietnam) 94 killed 36 missing |
- 300 civilians killed

The Battle of Hồng Ngự took place from March to 4 May 1973 when North Vietnamese forces attacked the border town of Hồng Ngự in Dong Thap Province in order to interdict supply convoys into Cambodia. The attack was defeated by South Vietnamese forces assisted by United States bombing of North Vietnamese base areas in Cambodia.

== Background ==
Since the Khmer Rouge had closed off access to Cambodia's sea ports, supplies for the Khmer Republic were dependent on convoys up the Mekong River from South Vietnam. South Vietnam's border provinces of Kien Phong, Châu Đốc and Kiên Giang, as well as the southern areas of the adjacent Cambodian provinces of Prey Veng, Kandal, Takéo and Kampot, had long been used by the People's Army of Vietnam (PAVN) and Viet Cong (VC) for base areas and lines of communication. In early 1973 the PAVN had up to 11 regiments in Cambodia, all used in South Vietnam except for 3 or 4 deployed against the Khmer National Armed Forces (FANK).

The US and South Vietnamese were determined to keep the convoys moving and the Khmer Republic alive, while the PAVN was determined to stop them. The South Vietnamese also sought to prevent PAVN main force incursions and infiltration of supplies and men into South Vietnam and the PAVN sought to keep its lines of communication open through Cambodia and into South Vietnam.

The river town of Hồng Ngự, where the Hồng Ngự tributary flows into the Mekong River, became the focal point of the PAVN's attacks to clear impediments to infiltration and interdict the Mekong convoys as they moored at the Republic of Vietnam Navy base at Tân Châu opposite Hồng Ngự before crossing into Cambodia.

== Battle ==
In March the PAVN concentrated the 174th and 207th Regiments, 6th Division, the 272nd Regiment (detached from the 9th Division) and elements of the 75th Artillery Group in Base Area 704 in Prey Veng Province, Cambodia northwest of Hồng Ngự. With the 207th leading, supported by artillery, the PAVN attacked from Base Area 704 towards Hồng Ngự. Not only did they meet immediate heavy resistance, but their rear area was pounded by USAF B-52's and tactical bombers. While US forces had disengaged from Vietnam on 28 January 1973 in accordance with the terms of the Paris Peace Accords, US military operations in Cambodia and Laos would continue until 15 August 1973 and the USAF was heavily engaged in support of the FANK campaign to clear the banks of the Mekong from the Vietnam border to Phnom Penh. One B-52 strike on 23 April 1973 north of the border between the Mekong and the Hồng Ngự stream caught a large portion of the attacking force with survivors reported seeing impressed civilians carrying the bodies of more than 100 PAVN from the area.

In mid-April the Army of the Republic of Vietnam (ARVN) 15th Infantry Regiment, 9th Division, together with the 2nd Armored Cavalry Squadron and a Regional Forces Group countererattacked. Although casualties were heavy, Republic of Vietnam Air Force and Navy support helped enable the ARVN troops to clear the east bank of the Mekong from Hồng Ngự to the Cambodian frontier. The attack inflicted heavy casualties on the PAVN and dealt a damaging blow to their morale. By the end of May, one battalion of the 207th Regiment had only 100 men.

== Aftermath ==
By 4 May the fighting had reduced to intermittent small contacts and light shellings. 422 PAVN dead had been counted, while ARVN casualties were 94 killed and 36 missing. Civilian casualties in the action were by far the highest since the ceasefire, over 300, of which 80 were killed by PAVN artillery. Almost 300 houses were destroyed by PAVN fire. In the second week of April alone 123 122mm rockets hit Hồng Ngự.
