= Nguyễn Viết Thanh =

South Vietnamese general (1931-1970

- Born: January 1, 1931; Long An, French Indochina
- Died: May 2, 1970 (aged 39)
- Military career
- Allegiance: State of Vietnam; South Vietnam
- Branch: Vietnamese National Army; Army of the Republic of Vietnam
- Service years: 1951 – 25 October 1955 (Vietnamese National Army); 26 October 1955 – 2 May 1970 (Army of the Republic of Vietnam)
- Rank: Major general
- Commands: 7th Infantry Division; IV Corps

Nguyễn Viết Thanh (1931–2 May 1970) was born in Long An, French Indochina. He served in the Vietnam National Army and the Army of the Republic of Vietnam, rising to the Major General.

== Military career ==
=== Vietnam National Army ===
Toward the end of March 1951, he was drafted to join the Army and enlisted in the Đà Lạt Military Academy. On 1 April 1951, he joined the Lý Thường Kiệt class which was the 4th class of the academy. He graduated on 1 December 1951, with the rank of second lieutenant.

After graduation, he was appointed platoon commander of the 12th Platoon of the 51st Company of the 15th Battalion of Vietnam which was stationed in Rạch Giá. In late 1952, he was appointed commander of the 51st Company of the 15th Battalion. In June 1953, he was promoted to lieutenant.

In December 1953, he assumed a battalion commander of the 707th Local Battalion.

In early 1955, he was promoted to captain. In April of the same year, he attended the Regiment Commander training at the Center for Military Studies in Sài Gòn.

=== Army of the Republic of Vietnam ===
In late 1955, Prime Minister Ngo Dinh Diem changed the name of the Vietnam National Army to the Army of the Republic of Vietnam. He retained the same position in a new military structure.

In early 1956, moving to the field of Military Training, he assumed the Chief of Staff position of the Đà Lạt Military Academy. In the middle of 1956, he left South Vietnam to attend senior infantry training at the United States Army Infantry School at Fort Benning, Georgia, USA.

In early 1957, after completing the training in the US, he was transferred to Thủ Đức Military Academy to hold the position of battalion commander of the 6th class of The Reserve Officer Cadet. On 26 October 1959, National Day of The First Republic, he was promoted to major.

In early 1960, he was transferred to the headquarters to take on the position of Chief of the Defense Planning Department.

In February 1961, transferring to the field of Military Administration, he was appointed major of Long An province.

In mid-1962, he left Long An province to assume the position of Regiment Commander of the 12th Regiment, 7th Infantry Division.

On 20 December 1963 he moved back to the administrative field to be the major of a newly re-established Gò Công province. In February 1964, he was promoted to lieutenant colonel.

In April 1965, he handed over Gò Công province to his successor. Returning to the infantry, he was promoted to Colonel, and he was appointed to be commander of the 7th Infantry Division. Colonel Sidney Bryan Berry, senior adviser to the 7th Division in 1965, had described Thanh as an "aggressive" commander with "sound tactical sense" who "knows when to commit his reserve" and "has a deep understanding of the war and his division." On June 19, 1966, Armed Forces Day, he was promoted to Brigadier General.

In October 1966, he was appointed head of the delegation along with Brigadier General Phạm Quốc Tâm, commander of the 5th Infantry Division, to guide the delegation on an official visit to Taiwan.

In 1967 he was rated by COMUSMACV General William Westmoreland as the best ARVN division commander. However, Civil Operations and Revolutionary Development Support (CORDS) advisers differed and in 1967 found "his personal cautiousness and reluctance to push the battalions [those in securing missions] into more offensive activities... difficult to understand," claiming that he discouraged the initiative and aggressiveness of his subordinates." CORDS chief Robert Komer agreed and in 1968 described Thanh as unaggressive, unimaginative, and "rather a xenophobe."

On 19 June 1968, he was promoted to Major general. In early July, he was appointed commander of IV Corps and Fourth Corps Tactical Zone.

Major general George S. Eckhardt, a senior IV Corps adviser in 1968 and 1969, related Thanh's popularity when the two generals flew to My Tho, Thanh's previous 7th divisional headquarters, for a quiet lunch. When people learned of their presence, they crammed into the restaurant to welcome his return. For over half an hour, "Thanh bowed and shook hands with the stream of well-wishers." Brigadier General George Wear commented, "When the ARVN troops were well-led they fought as well as anyone's soldiers." Thanh was one such commander.

On 2 May 1970, Thanh flew in a helicopter to direct the Cửu Long (Mekong) offensive operation over the Cambodian border to destroy communist sanctuaries. His helicopter collided in midair with a U.S. AH-1 Cobra attack helicopter 10 miles (16 km) inside Cambodia. Thanh was killed aged 39.

According to COMUSMACV General Creighton Abrams, on 20 May 1970 tape, "The handling of the forces and the tactics by all the forces in IV Corps can only be described as brilliant." Thanh planned the Parrot's Beak, Cambodia operation himself and he kept his plan secret from his staff. He only revealed the plan to General Hal D. McCown, senior adviser of Delta Regional Assistance Command. One day before the start of the Cửu Long (Mekong) operation, 1 May 1970, he instructed the 9th division commander on what he wanted him to execute. "It was really beautifully done."

== Awards and citations ==
- Silver Star Medal
- Officer of the Legion of Merit
- Bronze Star Medal
