= Vĩnh Bình province =

Historic province of Vietnam

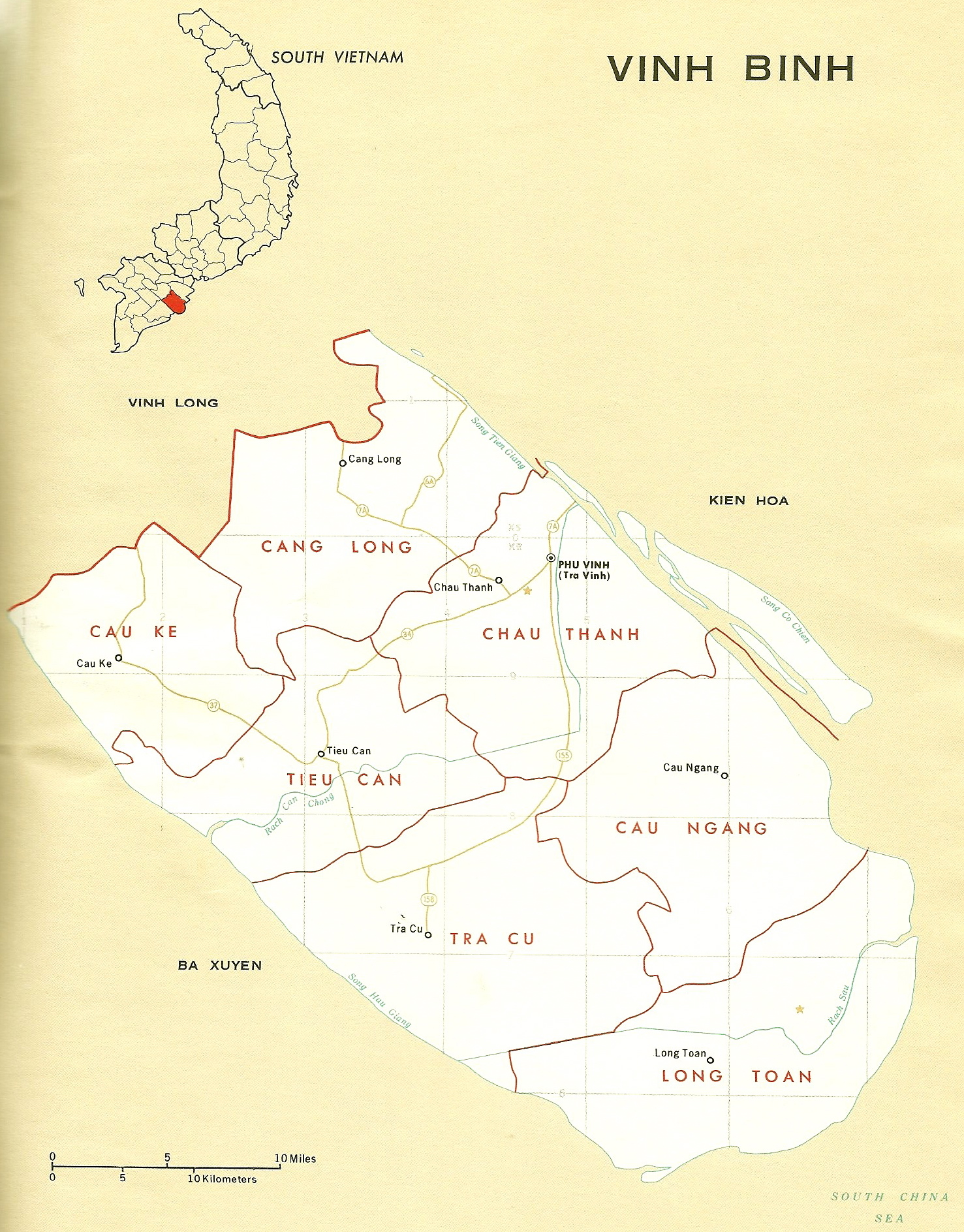

Vĩnh Bình was a province in the Mekong Delta region of southern Vietnam. It was merged in 1976 to Cửu Long province and in 1992 re-split as Trà Vinh province.

In the Vietnam War Vĩnh Binh was a province of the Republic of Vietnam. It was located in the IV Corps Military Region of the RVN.
