= Nguyễn Vĩnh Nghi =

Historical South Vietnamese military officer

- Born: October 1, 1932; Gia Định, French Indochina
- Military career
- Allegiance: State of Vietnam; South Vietnam
- Branch: Vietnamese National Army; Army of the Republic of Vietnam
- Service years: 1951 – 25 October 1955 (Vietnamese National Army); 26 October 1955 – 30 April 1975 (Army of the Republic of Vietnam)
- Rank: Lieutenant general
- Commands: 21st Division; IV Corps

Nguyễn Vĩnh Nghi was a Lieutenant general in the South Vietnamese Army of the Republic of Vietnam (ARVN).

== Early life and family ==
Nghi was born in October 1932, in Gia Định (a district of Saigon), and graduated from a French program high school. His wife is Kim Tuyet (daughter of Ms To Thi Than, former Chairman of the National Vietnamese Women Association and former Chairman cum Editor of the daily newspaper Saigon Moi).

== Military career ==
Nghi attended the Dalat Military Academy, class of 5 (Hoang Dieu, 1/07/1951- 24/04/1952) and graduated in 1952 with the rank of First Lieutenant. His teacher and friend was Second Lieutenant Nguyễn Văn Thiệu who became President of South Vietnam in 1965-1975.

- 1953: Nghi was promoted to Second Lieutenant.
- 1954: Nghi was promoted to a rank of captain and was appointed to the position of deputy battalion commander of the Vietnamese Republican Army.
- 1955: Nghi was promoted to Major as Chief of the newly formed 31st Infantry Division. In early June, he was appointed Chief of Staff of this division.
- 1960: Nghi was nominated as deputy commander of the National Military School of Dalat. Then he was sent to attend the US Army Command & General Staff at Fort Leavenworth, Kansas, United States.
- 1963: Nghi was promoted to Lieutenant colonel, after the November coup.
- 1966: in February, he was promoted to Colonel.
- In June 1968 Nghi was promoted to Brigadier general and appointed as commander of the 21st Division replacing Major general Nguyen Van Minh. This promotion was "despite long-standing and justified accusations of corruption" and under his command the division's "combat effectiveness slowly sank."
- 1970: in June, Nghi was promoted to Major general.

On 4 May 1972 he was appointed as commander of IV Corps, replacing General Ngô Quang Trưởng.

In March 1974 Nghi was promoted to Lieutenant general. On 30 October 1974, he was replaced as IV Corps commander by Major general Nguyễn Khoa Nam due to his corruption. He then replaced Lieutenant general Nguyen Van Minh as Commander of the Thủ Đức Military Academy.

On 4 April 1975 following the defeat of ARVN forces in the Central Highlands the two remaining provinces of II Corps were incorporated into III Corps and Nghi arrived at Phan Rang Air Base to take over the defense of the area from Republic of Vietnam Air Force 6th Air Division commander Brigadier general Pham Ngoc Sang.

On 16 April under pressure from People's Army of Vietnam (PAVN) forces, Nghi ordered his remaining forces to retreat from the base to the Ca Na peninsula (11.3455°N 108.877°E) 19 miles (31 km) south of the base and after cutting through the perimeter fence a large group of RVNAF, ARVN and South Vietnamese civilians fled the base joining up with the ARVN 11th Airborne Brigade outside the base. At midnight on 17 April the Airborne attacked a PAVN force on Route 11, but in the confusion of the attack Nghi, his command group and CIA Agent James Lewis became separated and at 02:00 were captured by the PAVN.

Nghi was sent to a detention camp in Suoi Dau, Khánh Hòa province, and then to another camp in Danang. Finally, he was sent to a reeducation camp in Sơn Tây, North Vietnam.

== Later life ==
Nghi was released in 1988 and emigrated to the United States in 1992.
