= IV Corps (South Vietnam) =

- Quân đoàn IV
- Active: 1955–1975
- Country: South Vietnam
- Branch: ARVN
- Type: Corps
- Garrison/HQ: Mekong Delta
- Motto: Tự Thắng - Tự Cường (Self Winning - Self Reinforcing)
- Engagements: Vietnam War

Commanders
- Notable commanders: Huỳnh Văn Cao; Ngô Quang Trưởng; Nguyễn Vĩnh Nghi; Nguyễn Khoa Nam

Insignia
- Division flag

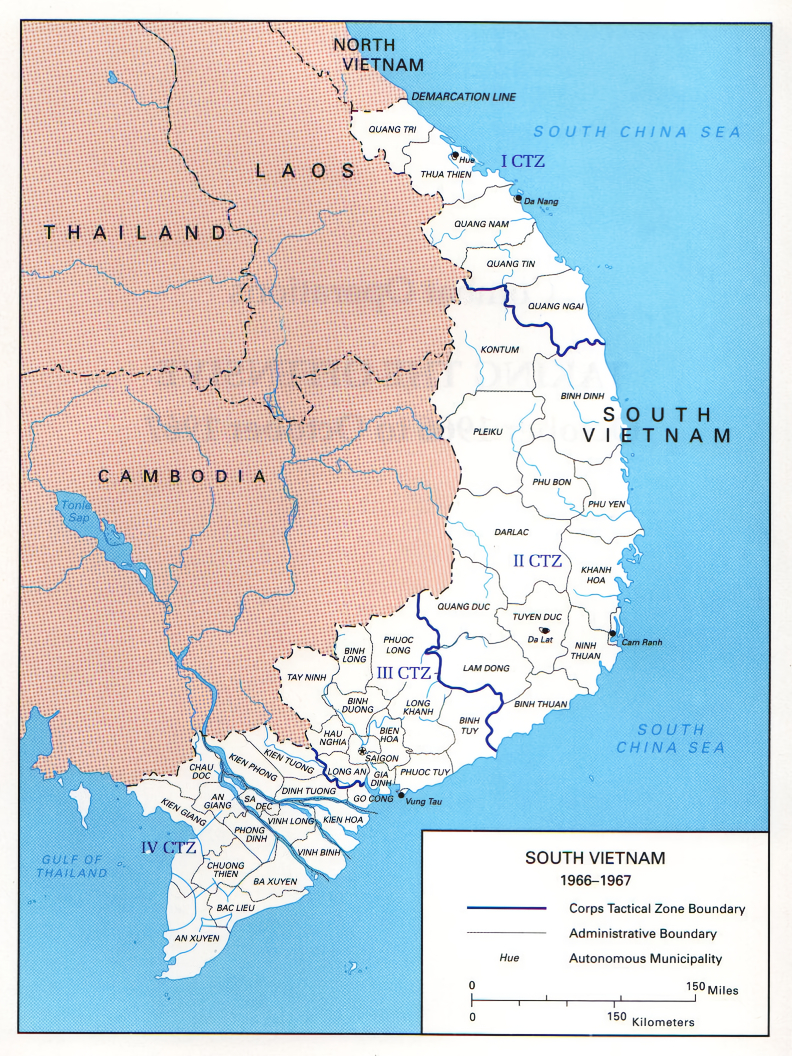
Map depicting the military regions of South Vietnam including IV Corps

The IV Corps (Vietnamese: Quân đoàn IV) was a corps of the Army of the Republic of Vietnam (ARVN), the army of the nation state of South Vietnam that existed from 1955 to 1975. It was one of four corps in the ARVN, and it oversaw the Mekong Delta region of the country.

The Mekong Delta was the heartland of agricultural South Vietnam, it encompassed the fertile alluvial plains formed by the Mekong River and its main tributary, the Bassac River. With its sixteen provinces, the Delta contained about two-thirds of the nation's population and yielded the same proportion in rice production. The terrain of IV Corps differed radically from other regions. Flat and mostly uncovered, it consisted of mangrove swamps and ricefields crisscrossed by an interlocking system of canals, natural and artificial. Except for some isolated mountains to the west near the Cambodian border, few areas in the Delta had an elevation of more than 10 feet (3.0 m) above sea level. During the monsoon season, most of the swampy land north of Route QL-4, generally called the Plain of Reeds, was inundated, especially when alluvial waters raised the level of the Mekong River from July to October. Other undeveloped swampy areas along the coast had turned into havens that sheltered Viet Cong (VC) main force units just as the scattered bases inland offered good refuge for local guerrillas.

== History ==
=== 1957-1961 ===
IV Corps headquarters was located at Mỹ Tho with its assigned unit being the 16th Light Division.

The 7th Division based in Mỹ Tho, and due to the division's close proximity to the capital Saigon was a key factor in the success or failure of the various coup attempts in the nation's history. In the coup attempt of 1960, the loyalist Colonel Huỳnh Văn Cao used the 7th Division to storm into Saigon to save President Ngô Đình Diệm.

=== 1962 ===
In 1962, Diem decided to split the command of the area in the south around Saigon into two, the former III Corps area being reduced in size to cover the area northeast of Saigon, and the newly created IV Corps taking over the west and southwest. Cao was promoted to general and assumed command of the new IV Corps Tactical Zone, which included the area of operations of his 7th Infantry Division.

On 15 April the United States Marine Corps began Operation Shufly to improve the mobility of ARVN forces by deploying a Marine helicopter squadron to Soc Trang Airfield.

On 24 April 16 USMC helicopters supported the 21st Division in Operation Nightingale conducted near Can Tho. The operation resulted in 70 VC killed and three captured for the loss of three ARVN killed.

In early September 1962, the USMC Shufly squadron began redeploying with its support units to Da Nang Air Base in I Corps, completing the redeployment by 20 September. Simultaneously the United States Army's 93rd Helicopter Company moved from Da Nang to Soc Trang.

=== 1964 ===
On 30 January 1964 General Nguyễn Khánh overthrew General Dương Văn Minh in a bloodless coup. By 6 March Khánh had replaced three of the four Corps commanders. Khánh replaced General Nguyễn Hữu Có with a political supporter, Brigadier general Dương Văn Đức as Corps' commander.

On 24 February 1964 Khánh issued the 1964 National Campaign Plan under the name Chien Thang (Struggle for Victory). Khanh decided the provinces surrounding Saigon would receive top priority in the distribution of troops, civil servants, and money. The rest of III Corps and IV Corps were next in the resource queue, whereas the provinces of II and I Corps had the lowest priority. One reason why the north received the least resources was that, at least before late 1963, it had appeared to be in the best shape. Thus, Chien Thang forecast that I and II Corps would be the first to enter into the final phase, the destruction of the enemy's last major formations and bases in January 1965, whereas III and IV Corps would not reach that point until January 1966.

The Corps' two infantry divisions and territorials numbered about 52,000 men. The allies estimated that the VC had 5,000 regulars and 25,000 guerrillas, yielding the lowest government-to-enemy advantage of any Corps' zone. Here, as throughout the country, the VC targeted the territorials. On average, an ARVN battalion engaged the VC once every two weeks, and Civil Guard companies made contact two out of every three days.

By mid-1964 IV Corps had made some progress, all provinces had approved Chien Thang plans. The Corps had received a psychological warfare battalion, and the command had imposed a nighttime curfew on all waterways to improve resources control. The ARVN were conducting more operations and had made significant progress in consolidating static forces into more mobile formations. Between October 1963 and March 1964, the number of small posts in the delta had declined from 1,300 to 850. However the Corps was below its authorized strength of 21,025 regulars, with a foxhole strength of just 10,174 men.

The VC summer offensive in IV Corps generated a 46 percent increase in insurgent-initiated incidents during the third quarter of 1964 over the previous one. As elsewhere in South Vietnam, the VC handed the government some embarrassing reverses. However, in many instances, government troops had performed well, backed by U.S. aviation whose presence sometimes made the difference between victory and defeat, or between defeat and disaster. As far as pacification was concerned, nearly every province in IV Corps reported slight gains in the number of people living under government control/influence.

On 5 September, the Joint General Staff (JGS) abolished the Tien Giang Tactical Area. It transferred the 7th Division and four of the five provinces it supervised to IV Corps and assigned Long An Province to III Corps.

On 13 September, Corps' commander Đức, together with former III Corps commander Brigadier general Lâm Văn Phát, launched an abortive coup against Khánh, sending the 7th Division into Saigon. The coup failed to gain support and by the next day had unravelled. Khanh then replaced three of the four corps commanders, six of the nine division commanders, and a third of all province chiefs. General Nguyễn Văn Thiệu was appointed as the new Corps commander. The government created two new provinces in IV Corps, forming Bac Lieu from portions of Ba Xuyen and Chuong Thien, and Chau Doc by taking several districts from An Giang province.

When COMUSMACV General William Westmoreland visited IV Corps in late 1964, he expressed relief at the "bright outlook" he found in the delta. Westmoreland believed what the delta needed was not more regular soldiers, it already had three of South Vietnam's nine divisions, but more and better trained police, civilian cadre, and territorials. These were the key to the "hold" part of clear-and-hold operations. Without them, government control would not be able to take root and expand, for the ARVN would be tied down protecting communities to such a degree that it would be unable to combat the VC’s growing conventional military forces.

In addition to having to deal with the VC, the Corps also had to deal with increasingly bellicose Cambodian forces as the ARVN engaged or pursued VC forces near and across the Cambodian border.

A year-end survey by the Corps' new senior adviser, found that only three of 15 sector advisers felt pacification was proceeding satisfactorily. Population control was assessed to have declined from 60% in January to 58% in December.

By the end of 1964 a US Army helicopter aviation company or US Marine Corps helicopter squadron was assigned in direct support of each Vietnamese infantry division, with two additional helicopter companies in general support of III and IV Corps. Further fixed-wing transport, reconnaissance, and observation aircraft were available as well. As a result, each senior Corps adviser had between 70 and 100 aircraft at his disposal, with MACV retaining control over the rest.

=== 1965 ===
During the first three months of 1965 VC regulars kept largely to their bases, in part because COSVN directed the region to focus on building forces and sending troops north for operations in more important theaters. Small-scale ambushes and forays against hamlets and outposts, interspersed by brief bombardments of district towns, were about the best the Front could muster. Still, the VC remained active, with IV Corps accounting for 31% of all attacks nationwide during the first quarter of the year.

Just as the VC focused its strategy farther north, so too did the South Vietnamese. The pacification plan continued earlier policy in assigning IV Corps a low priority. For 1965, the Corps was to maintain existing areas of government control while gradually expanding the oil spots where it could. However, unlike the rest of the country, the Corps kept 50% of its regular army forces free for mobile operations, a far higher number than in any other part of South Vietnam, to strike VC bases to disrupt their ability to launch major operations. Thieu focussed on creating a belt of government control running from east to west across the upper delta. This would both enhance Saigon's security and cut off the VC farther south from the rest of the country. As always, he stressed the importance of keeping open Highway 4, over which trucks carried 2 million tons of food annually to Saigon.

In January the government promoted Thieu to Lieutenant general and brought him to Saigon. The Joint General Staff then assigned the commander of the 21st Division, Major general Đặng Văn Quang, to command IV Corps and sent the Army's Chief of Military Security, Colonel Nguyen Van Phuoc, south to command the 21st Division.

Although the government won several victories during the first three months of the year in IV Corps, these engagements had not altered significantly the situation on the ground. If the inability to protect the Corps' many far-flung communities from small-scale acts of terror and harassment contributed to the problem at one end of the scale, so too did the VC's big battalions on the other end of the spectrum. Here, as well as elsewhere in the country, the VC's ability to keep these units largely intact acted as a powerful deterrent against the government conducting small-scale security operations. Even during periods of relative inactivity, the mere possibility that government troops might encounter an enemy battalion discouraged commanders from operating in squad, platoon and company strength. By the end of March, the number of the Corps' 4.2 million people living under government control had crept up slightly, from 31% to 33%.

In April, Westmoreland convinced the JGS to order the commanders of I, II, and IV Corps to develop Hop Tac-style pacification programs for their areas. After receiving joint MACV-JGS briefings about the program, the commanders presented their plans on 3 May. IV Corps was to create a Hop Tac program centered on Can Tho.

From 4 to 6 April the 21st Division conducted Operation Dan Chi 129 against the VC stronghold in the U Minh forest in Kiên Giang province killing 278 VC for the loss of five ARVN and six US killed.

Thanks in part to the efforts of the 7th Division and the other security forces in IV Corps, not to mention the VC's decision to transfer troops out of the delta to strengthen holdings elsewhere, the situation in IV Corps was relatively stable by mid-1965. The VC still controlled significant numbers of people and vast tracts of land, but the South Vietnamese usually were able to keep the main roads, rivers, and canals open. The government had managed to secure 276 delta hamlets, adding 300,000 more people to the rolls of those living under its control.

By late 1965 Westmoreland considered Quang, to be "an excellent corps commander and leader." Yet continued charges of corruption and his close political ties with his predecessor, Thiệu, clouded his professional reputation. Assessments of Quang's three major subordinates were, in the main, positive.

On 18 December the US Navy established Operation Game Warden to interdict VC infiltration in the Mekong Delta. Task Force 116 was the main unit responsible for Game Warden and it consisted of five divisions patrolling different sections of the Delta, originally equipped with river patrol boats (PBRs) and mine sweeping boats (MSBs).

In the Combined Campaign Plan for 1966, which the JGS and MACV issued in December, the allies declared their "basic objective" for the year to be clearing, securing, and developing the heavily populated regions around Saigon, in the Mekong Delta, and in selected portions of the I and II Corps coastal plain. "Coincident" with this effort, they would defend significant outlying government and population centers and conduct search and destroy operations against "major VC/PAVN forces." In pursuit of these objectives, South Vietnamese forces would concentrate on defending, clearing, and securing the designated strategic areas. American and third-country forces, besides securing their own bases and helping to protect rice-producing areas, were to "conduct operations outside of the secure areas against VC forces and bases." Implicit in these words was the defacto division of labor between the South Vietnamese and Americans that had been in effect since the summer.

=== 1966 ===
In November the Directory appointed General Nguyễn Văn Mạnh to replace Quang as Corps' commander.

Also in November MACV and the JGS released their new combined campaign plan. It reflected the division of labor already in effect. The plan divided South Vietnam into three mission-oriented areas. Critical were those designated as "National Priority Areas" and "Areas of Priority for Military Offensive Operations." The remainder constituted a mix of sparsely inhabited regions of less military consequence or areas where weather, terrain, or troop strength limited allied effectiveness, such as those opposite the DMZ or along the Laotian border. The two priority categories comprised about half of South Vietnam and included about 77% of its population, 85% of its food production, and 75% of its roads. According to MACV, these areas also contained 77% of the enemy's conventional units and 43% of his bases Ostensibly, South Vietnamese forces would have primary responsibility for providing security in the National Priority Areas-heavily populated zones with reasonably good road and water networks. For this mission, all ARVN regular infantry battalions were to receive special revolutionary development, or pacification, training during 1966 and 1967, and at least half were to be assigned direct pacification support or security missions as soon as possible. Meanwhile, the more mobile American forces would take the fight to the enemy in the less accessible Areas of Priority for Military Offensive Operations. Only in IV Corps were both securing and offensive missions given to South Vietnamese commanders. While the South Vietnamese would pursue a strategy of pacification, US forces would follow one of attrition.

The heavily populated central Delta, composed of An Giang, Sa Dec, and Vinh Long provinces as well as portions of Phong Dinh and Vinh Binh was the Corps' National Priority Area. Mạnh's task was to maintain and expand government control and to keep the overland link with Saigon, Highway 4, free of VC harassment. About two-thirds of his combat strength at anyone time was devoted to offensive operations, while the remainder handled pacification security. However, Mạnh was unable to take the initiative from the VC and by 1967 the best Saigon could claim in the delta was a stalemate.

=== 1967 ===
On 10 March the US 2nd Brigade, 9th Infantry Division moved from Bearcat Base in III Corps to the newly-completed Đồng Tâm Base Camp.

In May the US Army/Navy Mobile Riverine Force (MRF) became operational at Dong Tam. The MRF began its first operation, Palm Beach, on 15 May. The MRF was only officially activated on 1 June with the arrival at Dong Tam of its full naval complement. The 3rd and 4th Battalions, 47th Infantry, and supporting units were stationed aboard ship, leaving only rear-area detachments and the 3rd Battalion, 60th Infantry, ashore at Dong Tam.

From 19 June to 21 July the MRF conducted Operation Coronado I in the Cần Giuộc district.

From 27 to 31 July the MRF and 3rd Marine and 44th Ranger Battalions conducted Operation Coronado II around Mỹ Tho.

From 19 August to 9 September the MRF conducted Operation Coronado IV in Long An, Gò Công and Kiến Hòa provinces.

From 12 September to 5 October the MRF and Regional Forces conducted Operation Coronado V in Định Tường and Kiến Hòa provinces.

In October MACV and South Vietnamese commands finalized plans for the upcoming year. Although pacification activities occurred in every province in South Vietnam, the Combined Campaign Plan for 1968 (AB 143) continued the previous year's program of concentrating resources on 26 of South Vietnam's 44 provinces. Omitted were areas where the enemy's military forces were strongest. The 1968 plan called for the greatest effort to be made in areas close to Saigon, with the rest of the country receiving progressively fewer resources the farther north or south one traveled from that location. The MACV and Vietnamese staffs further decided that for 1968 they would focus the pacification effort on two types of areas. First, they wished to solidify control over areas in which the South Vietnamese government already held some sway. Second, they wanted to target areas where a significant number of people could be added to the rolls of those living under government authority without expanding allied resources over a large physical area. Military plans reflected the pacification design. The 1968 Campaign Plan designated most of the pacification priority provinces as priority areas for offensive military operations. The allies planned only minimal operations in the VC-dominated Mekong Delta. Since the areas the allies planned to target in 1968 were similar to those of 1967, little movement of forces was needed to execute the AB 143 plan.

By November 1967, MACV analysts determined that roughly a third of the people who lived in the 16 delta provinces that made up the Corps Tactical Zone lived under some degree of VC control. VC main and local forces the IV Corps numbered 22 battalions and 74 companies. Backing them were an additional 32,000 guerrilla and infrastructure personnel. COSVN controlled those forces through two regional headquarters. Military Region 2 encompassed the provinces in the upper part of the Corps, an area more or less bounded by the Bassac River to the south and the Vam Co Tay River to the north. Its headquarters was in Base Area 704 on the border of Kien Tuong province and Cambodia. The second command, Military Region 3, directed operations in the Corps’ southern and western provinces. It resided in the U Minh Forest on the southwestern coast of Kien Giang province.

From 1 November to 22 January 1968 the MRF and Vietnamese Marines conducted Operation Coronado IX in Dinh Tuong province.

From 16 to 19 November the 7th and 9th Divisions, MRF and elements of the US 3rd Brigade, 9th Infantry Division conducted Operation Kien Giang 9-1 against Base Area 470 in western Dinh Tuong province.

By 1967 Brigadier general William R. Desobry, the US senior adviser since August 1965, felt that the ARVN now had the upper hand in IV Corps. He considered the 21st Division under General Nguyễn Văn Minh the best in the army, and the 9th Division not far behind. Only the 7th Division, whose area of operation included many traditional VC strongholds, was having difficulties, but Desobry expected that the recent arrival of the US 9th Infantry Division would help the 7th pick up the pace.

In December, upon the recommendation of the US 5th Special Forces Group commander, the JGS established the 44th Special Tactical Zone along the Cambodian frontier to control all border surveillance and interdiction efforts there. The US Special Forces advisers had sought a Vietnamese Special Forces commander for the new zone, but instead JGS chairman General Cao Văn Viên gave the command to Colonel Nguyen Huu Hanh, a senior officer from the 21st Division.

By the end of 1967 US Civil Operations and Revolutionary Development Support advisors reported that the commanders of the 9th and 21st Divisions rotated combat battalions with population security roles every three months, fearing that units performing static security for long periods of time would eventually disintegrate through inactivity. But the result, according to the local American advisers, was the lack of any continuity in the security effort. Nevertheless, in the area of the 7th Division, where there was no unit rotation, CORDS advisers found the battalions charged with area security missions more concerned with their own static defenses than with protecting nearby villages and hamlets or with chasing the local VC. Perhaps the special revolutionary development training had not differentiated between static and offensive security operations, or perhaps the commanders assigned area security tasks viewed the mission only as an opportunity for their units to rest.

=== 1968 ===
On 23 January the MRF began Operation Coronado X. Originally planned as a sweep of western Dinh Tuong and eastern Kien Phong provinces, however with the outbreak of the Tet Offensive on 31 January it instead became an operation to eject VC forces from Mỹ Tho and Vĩnh Long. It continued until 12 February and resulted in 269 VC killed for the loss of 12 US killed.

During the Tet Offensive Mạnh was preoccupied with the security of his headquarters at Cần Thơ Base Camp, rather than commanding his subordinate units throughout his Corps Tactical Zone. At Can Tho ARVN troops refused to attack the VC forces occupying the local university and the latter finally had to be rooted out by massive air attacks. A "very bad show" and a "very lousy job," said Westmoreland.

From 10 February to 10 March the US 9th Infantry Division conducted Operation Hop Tac I along Route 4 in Dinh Tuong Province.

From 12 February to 3 March the MRF and ARVN forces conducted Operation Coronado XI to eject the VC 303rd, 307th, 309th and Tay Do Battalions from the outskirts of Cần Thơ.

The Tet fighting had created a large number of refugees in the Corps for the first time in the war. The northeastern Delta provinces of Dinh Tuong, Go Cong, Kien Hoa, and Vinh Binh, saw particularly high numbers of refugees. Most of the outposts lost nationwide to abandonment or hostile action lay in the northeastern Delta. Rural security had also vanished in the upper Delta provinces that bordered Cambodia. In the central delta, the PAVN/VC had inflicted serious setbacks to the Revolutionary Development programs in Phong Dinh and Vinh Long provinces. The least affected provinces in the Corps were An Giang, dominated by the militantly anti-Communist Hoa Hao sect, and Chung Thien, which the PAVN/VC use as a staging area for attacks elsewhere in the region.

On 23 February 1968 Mạnh was replaced as IV Corps commander by Lieutenant general Nguyễn Đức Thắng. Westmoreland was extremely pleased by the move, calling it "the most important single appointment that has been made in the last year," and for the next few months Thắng proved himself an able military leader as well as a competent civil administrator.

In early March, most of the VC battalions in the Corps had split into small groups to evade detection. That gave Thắng, a bit of breathing space to repair the damage of Tet and to instill a more offensive spirit in his troops than had been present under Mạnh. On 7 March, the US 1st and 2nd Brigades, 9th Division and elements of the 7th Division commenced Operation Truong Cong Dinh to reestablish South Vietnamese control over the northern Mekong Delta. By the end of April, the operation had resulted in 343 VC killed against US losses of 51 killed. Unlike the precarious situation that had prevailed throughout February, PAVN/VC units no longer hovered on the outskirts of the provincial or district capitals in the northeastern Corps, and the frequency of mortar or recoilless rifle attacks on those cities had diminished to almost none.

In June, the US 3rd Brigade, 9th Infantry Division moved from Long An province to Dong Tam Base Camp where it joined the MRF. In July the 9th Division headquarters moved to Dong Tam.

In early July 1968 Thiệu replaced Thắng as Corps' commander with Major general Nguyễn Viết Thanh.

From 30 July to 8 August the US 2nd Brigade, 9th Infantry Division and the 5th Marine Battalion conducted Operation Vi Thanh in Chương Thiện province, resulting in 249 VC killed and 18 captured for the loss of three killed.

From 3 August to 31 November the MRF and the 7th Division conducted Operation Quyet Chien, a continuation of Operation Truong Cong Dinh in Ben Tre and Tien Giang provinces.

ARVN forces under the control of IV Corps consisted of three infantry divisions, two mobile and six border ranger groups. In addition, the territorial forces of MR-4 totaled about 200,000, by far the most numerous among the four military regions. The 7th Division was headquartered at Đồng Tâm Base Camp in Dinh Tuong Province; the 9th Division was located in Sa Đéc and the 21st Division usually operated in the Cà Mau Peninsula from its headquarters at Bạc Lieu. Despite the substantial combat support and significant advisory effort, both military and civilian, provided by the United States, primary responsibility for the combat effort in IV Corps had always been Vietnamese, even during the period when US units operated in the Mekong Delta.

=== 1969 ===
Central Office for South Vietnam's Resolution No. 9 disseminated in 1969, emphasized the strategic importance of the Mekong Delta and conceived it as the principal battlefield where the outcome of the war in South Vietnam would be decided, the PAVN/VC infiltrated the 1st Division Headquarters and its three regiments, the 88th, 101D and 95A into IV Corps. This effort succeeded despite heavy losses. IV Corps forces were thrown off-balance and the pacification effort declined as a result of extensive PAVN/VC attacks and shellings. Not until after the PAVN/VC's sanctuaries beyond the border had been destroyed during the Cambodian Campaign and their capability to resupply from the sea eliminated were these 1st Division forces compelled to break down into small elements and withdraw. Part of these elements fell back into bases within IV Corps; others retreated toward Cambodia.

Because of the importance of the Delta area, the selection of US 9th Infantry Division as the first combat unit to be withdrawn from Vietnam was a surprise, however enemy forces in the Delta were much weaker than at any other time; the area remained at the end of Hanoi's logistical pipeline; and, should trouble arise, MACV could easily reinforce the Delta with American units from the III Corps area. Elements of the US 9th Infantry Division began standing down on 18 June, and the division had left by the end of August, leaving one brigade behind in the Corps zone. Filling in behind it was the 7th Infantry Division, a marginal unit that had done little serious campaigning. At the time, five of its 12 infantry battalions were under the direct control of various province chiefs, and most of the remainder were scattered about performing static security missions. As these troops hastily occupied the evacuated American facilities at Dong Tam and elsewhere, they had little opportunity to familiarize themselves with the local enemy and terrain. Because of delays in the formation of new territorial units, Thanh continued to hold the division responsible for its existing area security missions. Thus, despite additional aviation support and the rapid activation of 34 new Regional Forces companies, the 7th Division was spread extremely thin, and its offensive capability dropped accordingly.

=== 1970 ===
Following the departure of the US 9th Infantry Division, the performance of the 7th Division was assessed as having gone steadily downhill. In January Thiệu appointed Colonel Nguyễn Khoa Nam to command the division.

In January, at the request of Ambassador Ellsworth Bunker, John Paul Vann produced his own evaluations of the Corps' leadership, which differed markedly from the official judgments of MACV. Vann recommended that all three division commanders and the special zone commander be relieved. Thiệu incidentally relieved the 7th Division commander three weeks later, but kept the 9th and 21st Division commanders in office and named the officer heading the special zone as the next commander of the 1st Division.

Enemy activity remained low in the Delta during late 1969 and 1970, as it did throughout South Vietnam, and the ineffectiveness of the 7th Division had no immediate repercussions. American Corps-level advisers believed that its shortcomings could be easily remedied or, at least for the time being, balanced by the increasing mobility of the neighboring 9th Division, which Thanh had withdrawn from its area security missions and was now using as the Corps' reaction force.

On 2 May Thanh was killed in a helicopter collision while directing the Cửu Long (Mekong) offensive operation over the Cambodian border to destroy PAVN/VC sanctuaries. Thiệu appointed Ngô Du as the new Corps commander and then when Du was appointed as II Corps commander in August, with General Ngô Quang Trưởng.

In August the senior US advisor reported concern over the lack of improvement in leadership and the lack of motivation in individual soldiers. The net result was a "greater reliance on air and artillery support and a greater reluctance to close with the enemy by fire and manuever." Too much of the Vietnamization program, he felt, was devoted to sophisticated equipment, and it was "increasingly evident" that this emphasis tended to "inhibit the [South] Vietnamese from responding with the more primitive means available to them to cope with infiltration and the problem of locating the enemy (such means as night ambushes and patrols)."

=== 1971 ===
IV Corps was able to regain the initiative during 1971. Its efforts during the year consisted of continuing operations on Cambodian soil to assist the weaker Khmer National Armed Forces and interdicting PAVN/VC supply routes into the Mekong Delta. Concurrently, it also emphasized the elimination of PAVN/VC's bases in the Delta. In addition, they also established a new system of outposts to maintain government control over what had been the PAVN/VC's long-established base areas. The most significant achievements during this period were the neutralization of the extremely heavy enemy fortifications of Base Area 400 in the That Son (Seven Mountains) area by the 9th Division, the continued destruction of Base Area 483 in the U Minh Forest by the 21st Division, the coordinated activities of the 7th Division and territorial forces in Base Area 470 on the boundary of Dinh Tuong and Kien Phong Provinces, and finally, the successful pacification campaign in Kien Hoa Province, the cradle of VC insurgency. As a result of these achievements, the situation in IV Corps was particularly bright by early 1972. About 95% of the Delta population lived in secure villages and hamlets. Rice production had increased substantially and education was available to every child of school age. Prospects for the Delta's future looked promising as key government programs such as Land-to-the-Tiller and Hamlet Self-Development were gaining momentum. The four-year Community Defense and Local Development Plan that the government had initiated in March 1972 presaged an even brighter future for the farmers of the Mekong Delta.

Prime Minister Trần Thiện Khiêm ordered Trưởng to halt his campaigns against "ghost" and "ornamental" soldiers, deserters, and draft-dodgers in the Corps' zone, claiming that his efforts were upsetting the Delta rice harvest. Trưởng questioned Khiêm's motives, but obeyed.

=== 1972 ===
On 22 March the PAVN 101D Regiment, 1st Division attacked the 42nd Ranger Group outpost at Kompong Trach 15 km north of the Cambodia-South Vietnam border. Fighting continued until the end of April as each side reinforced. The 1st Division eventually seized Kompong Trach, but had suffered heavy losses which impacted its later operations in the Corps.

On 7 April PAVN/VC local main force units, the 18B, 95B, D1 and D2 Regiments began their Easter Offensive attacks in the Delta, initially in Chương Thiện province. As the 21st Division and the 15th Regiment, 9th Division had been deployed to III Corps to reinforce the fighting at An Lộc, the PAVN/VC were initially able to have some success against isolated RF/PF outposts.

On 3 May 1972 Trưởng, was appointed commander of I Corps and Major General Nguyễn Vĩnh Nghi assumed command of the Corps.

On 18 May elements of the PAVN 52D and 101D Regiments, 1st Division attacked Kiên Lương, the fighting continued for ten days before ARVN Rangers and armored forces succeeded in forcing the PAVN to withdraw towards the Cambodian border.

On 23 May following fighting between the PAVN 207th Regiment and ARVN Ranger and armored forces in Cambodia, 15 km north of Cai Cai, the ARVN captured documents indicating plans for PAVN infiltration into northern Kiến Tường province and subsequent attacks against Mộc Hóa. Subsequent intelligence showed that the PAVN 5th Division which had been beaten at An Lộc was moving into the Elephant's Foot (10.87°N 105.9°E) area of Cambodia and would then move into Base Area 470 in the Plain of Reeds. The ARVN 7th Division deployed to the Elephant's Foot area to engage PAVN forces and with strong US air support inflicted severe losses on the PAVN units there. However, despite their losses two regiments from the PAVN 5th Division and the 24th and Z18 Regiments pushed towards Base Area 470 and by early July six PAVN regiments were located in northern Định Tường province.

In late June after 22 days of fighting the 7th Division recaptured Kompong Trabek and cleared Route QL-1 (Cambodia) to Neak Loeung, however the PAVN recaptured the area when the 7th Division was withdrawn back into the Corps in July to counter the PAVN/VC threat to Route QL-4, the vital supply line between the Delta's ricebowl and Saigon. With the return of the 21st Division and 15th Regiment, 9th Division to the Corps and continuous pounding from the air by US tactical air and B-52's, the ARVN was able to mount a series of operations in Định Tường province and Base Area 470 that forced the PAVN/VC to reduce their operations and disperse into smaller units or withdraw into Cambodia.

=== 1973 ===
From 15 January in anticipation of the Paris Peace Accords ceasefire, PAVN/VC and South Vietnamese forces attempted to maximize the territory under their control in the War of the flags before the ceasefire came into effect.

From July to October the 44th Special Tactical Zone, whose principal forces consisted of the 7th Ranger Group and the 4th Armor Group, conducted operations to force the PAVN 1st Division out of the Seven Mountains region, a chain of rugged, forested, cave-pocked peaks stretching 25km in a ragged line from the Cambodian border at Tịnh Biên to below Tri Tôn. By October the 1st Division had been deactivated and its units incorporated into the 101D Brigade.

=== 1974 ===
From 12 February to 4 May in the Battle of Tri Phap, Corps' forces successfully launched a pre-emptive attack on a PAVN base area in Dinh Tuong province.

On 9 March the PAVN fired an 82 mm mortar shell into the primary schoolyard at Cai Lậy while the children were lined up waiting to enter their classes. Twenty-three children died instantly; 46 others were badly wounded.

On 30 October Thieu replaced Nghi as Corps' commander with Major general Nguyễn Khoa Nam.

From 6-26 December PAVN/VC forces in the Delta had conducted the most widespread and intense attacks thus far in the war. They struck with greatest force in the Elephant's Foot area of Kien Tuong province, but strong attacks also occurred along lines of communication in Dinh Tuong, Chuong Thien, Da Xuyen, Vinh Binh, Vinh Long, and An Xuyen Provinces. Casualties on both sides were heavy: the ARVN had over 500 killed in action, and total casualties, including wounded and missing, exceeded 3,000; PAVN/VC casualties were estimated at over 3,500.

=== 1975 ===
During January violence spread throughout the Delta in a pre-Tết spasm of PAVN/VC attacks on lines of communication, cities, villages and outposts. General Nam continued to reduce the number of indefensible, isolated posts and to consolidate combat power in larger positions. Sixty-three posts in the delta were abandoned under this plan in January, while another 87 were either overrun or evacuated under pressure. Of the latter, ARVN counterattacks regained 24. The heaviest losses were in the far south, in Bac Lieu, where 23 posts were lost and only four retaken, and in An Xuyen, where 16 posts fell and only two were recovered. Half the posts voluntarily abandoned were also located in these two provinces, while the central provinces of Phong Dien and Sa Dec and the northern border sector of Kien Phong suffered very light damage. Even in the key central province of Chuong Thien, the ARVN lost very little; of the six posts lost to enemy attack, four were recaptured.

In northern Kien Tuong Province along the Cambodian-Svay Rieng border the PAVN 5th Division and the 7th Division engaged in heavy combat. By the end of January only two ARVN positions remained in Tuyen Binh District. Long Khot outpost was overrun by elements of the PAVN 6th and 174th Regiments using captured M113 armored personnel carriers. Toward the end of February, the 5th Division withdrew the battered 6th Regiment from action and sent it into Cambodia to receive replacements.

In mid-February the collapse of FANK forces in Cambodia caused more than 7,000 people, including at least 500 military, to seek refuge in Chau Doc province.

== Divisions ==
7th Infantry Division

9th Infantry Division

21st Infantry Division

4th Air Division
