= Lê Văn Hưng =

South Vietnamese general (1933–1975)

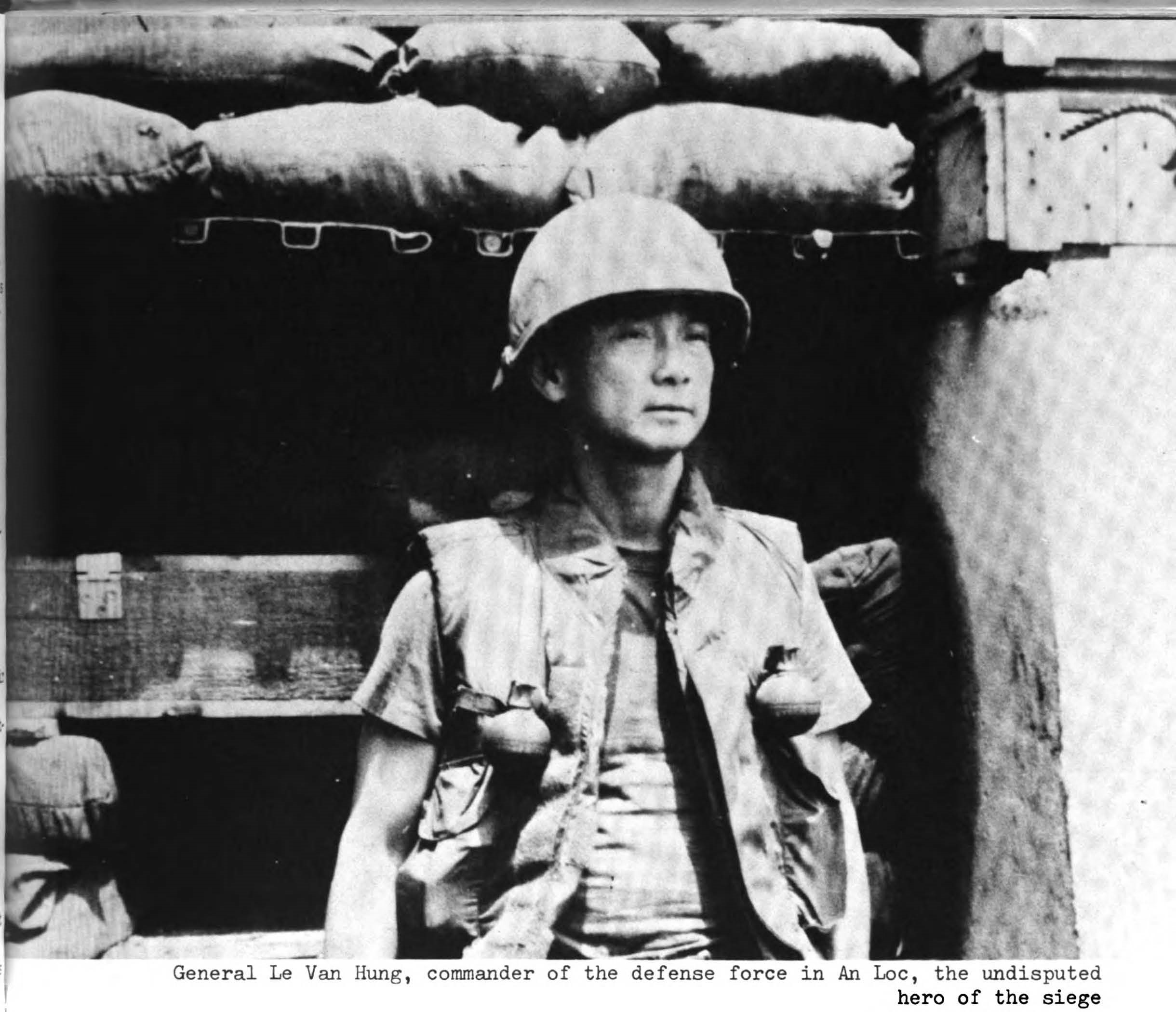
- Nickname: "Hero of An Lộc"
- Born: March 27, 1933; Hóc Môn, Gia Định province, French Indochina (now Hóc Môn, Ho Chi Minh City, Vietnam)
- Died: April 30, 1975 (aged 42) Cần Thơ, South Vietnam
- Allegiance: State of Vietnam; South Vietnam
- Branch: Vietnamese National Army; Army of the Republic of Vietnam
- Service years: 1954–1975
- Rank: Brigadier General (Chuẩn Tướng)
- Commands: 2nd Battalion 31st Infantry Regiment (1966–1969); 5th Infantry Division (1971–1972); MR3 Deputy Commander (Military Region 3) (1972); 21st Infantry Division (1973); IV Corps Deputy Commander (1974–1975)
- Conflicts: Vietnam War
- Children: 3
- Other work: Minister Phong Dinh Province (1970)

Lê Văn Hưng (March 27, 1933 – April 30, 1975) was an infantry general of the Army of the Republic of Vietnam. Hưng was perhaps best known as the "Hero of An Lộc" in 1972 when he commanded the 5th Division in defense of the city of An Lộc from the coordinated attacks of the North Vietnamese People's Army of Vietnam (PAVN) forces in the Battle of An Lộc.

== Early life ==
Hưng was born in Hóc Môn, in the Mekong Delta of Vietnam, and was raised by his widowed mother, Trương Thị Đức, and his stepfather, Trần Văn Kiển. He attended Huỳnh Khương Ninh High School and graduated in 1952 and later worked for a French company in Saigon.

== Military career ==
Hưng enlisted for the army in 1954 and later graduated from Thủ Đức Military Academy on February 1, 1955 – with the rank of Second Lieutenant. He held many commands in the Army of the Republic of Vietnam (ARVN) from company to battalion level.

In early 1957, he was promoted to full lieutenant and assigned as Captain of the 13th Battalion. In mid-1959, he was transferred to the 31st Regiment of the 21st Infantry Division to hold the 2nd position of the Regiment 2. In early 1961, he was seconded to the field of Administration to be the Chief of Vinh Binh Police Company. In mid-1962, he was appointed to the position of Mayor of Tra On District in Vinh Binh Province. In February 1964, he was promoted to captain, and in December of the same year, he was assigned to the 2nd Battalion Commander. At the end of 1966, he was assigned to the position of Regiment Commander of the Regiment 31.

In the middle of July 1970, he was once again seconded to Military Administration. He was appointed as Governor and Chief of Phong Dinh sub-region (now Can Tho City) to replace the deceased Colonel Nguyễn Văn Khương, who had fallen in battle. He was promoted to Brigadier general. In the middle of June 1971, he was ordered to hand over the position of the Governor-General of Phong Dinh Sub-division to Colonel Chương Dzềnh Quay (former commander of the 21st Infantry Division).

In April 1971 Hưng was appointed to take over the battered 5th Division from General Nguyễn Văn Hiếu. Hiếu's forces had been badly handled during the Battle of Snuol, and his troops, according to II Field Force, Vietnam commander Michael S. Davison, were close to mutiny. Unfortunately, Hưng was the one ARVN officer whose candidacy American advisers had specifically recommended against.

Living in a tiny underground bunker for almost three months, Hưng commanded soldiers of the 5th Division, the 81st Airborne Ranger Battalion, the 11th Airborne Brigade, the 21st Division and the Provincial Forces of Bình Long Province. His forces repelled countless waves of attack by the People's Army of Vietnam (PAVN) infantry, supported by T-54 tanks. Hưng vowed, "If I'm still alive, An Lộc still stands." He had spent so much time in the bunker that when the South Vietnamese President Nguyễn Văn Thiệu, accompanied by Lieutenant general Nguyễn Văn Minh, the III Corps commander visited An Loc after the siege, Thiệu noticed that Hưng was blinking incessantly under the shining sun. A while later Thiệu jokingly asked one of his aides, "Hung looked deceitful to me. Why do you think he kept constantly squinting and blinking his eyes?" The aide replied seriously stating: "Why, Mr. President, General Hung had not seen sunlight for a long, long time."

However, US advisers reported that Hưng "choked" and "didn't do a damn thing"; and threatened (privately) to shoot his deputy division commander at An Lộc. According to Brigadier general John R. McGiffert II, An Lộc would never have held out without the handful of American advisers directing the air strikes and shoring up the local leadership. Two of the few South Vietnamese leaders to stand out were Colonel Le Quang Luong, an airborne brigade commander, and Colonel Tran Van Nhut, the local province chief. Following the heavy fighting, Thieu replaced almost all of the division commanders in the zone with Hưng being replaced by Colonel Tran Quoc Lich, an Airborne officer, but promoted to be deputy III Corps commander.

Hưng was promoted to General in the field and later commanded the 21st Division before becoming Deputy Commander of the 4th Military Region (MR4).

When the PAVN made their "Hồ Chí Minh Campaign" final assault on South Vietnam in April 1975, before listening to the capitulation order of President Dương Văn Minh, Hung planned a secret operation to send remaining ARVN soldiers and officers at jungles and military bases that would continue counterattack against VC units after the Fall of Saigon. There he and his soldiers follow orders by the colonel to execute the location of secret delta places on long-term strategic resistance against VC for a few months until PAVN/VC declare a ceasefire hoping a new South Vietnam country at Mekong Delta.

== Death ==
On April 30, he received word that Minh had ordered South Vietnam's forces to surrender. At 20:00 Hưng gathered his staff, soldiers, and family to say goodbye. He was unable to fight to the death because the townspeople of Cần Thơ had begged him not to resist, believing that it would cause futile bloodshed, and Hưng was one of the five ARVN generals who committed suicide that day. Hưng shot himself in the chest with his pistol at his residence. His superior, Major general Nguyễn Khoa Nam, also committed suicide in the early morning of May 1, 1975. Both were buried in Can Tho military cemetery.

== Personal life ==
Lê Văn Hưng was married to Nguyễn Xuân Mai, who gave birth to a daughter, Lê Ánh Tuyết. They later divorced. His second wife, Phạm Thị Kim Hoàng, gave birth to his second daughter, Lê Thiên Hà, and his son, Lê Quốc Hải.

After Hung's suicide, his wife, Phạm Thị Kim Hoàng, and her children moved from Can Tho to Saigon. They later fled by boat to the Philippines and then migrated to the United States.
