= Operation Dan Chi 129 =

Part of the Vietnam War (1965)

- Part of the Vietnam War
Date	4-6 April 1965
Location	Kiên Lương district, South Vietnam
Result	South Vietnamese victory

Belligerents
South Vietnam; United States	Viet Cong

Commanders and leaders
(South Vietnam) Nguyễn Văn Minh	

Strength
(South Vietnam) 21st Division	

Casualties and losses
(South Vietnam) 5 killed (United States) 6 killed	278 killed 1 captured

Operation Dan Chi 129 (Vietnamese : Chiến dịch Dan Chi 129) was a 1965 Army of the Republic of Vietnam (ARVN) operation carried out with US support.

== Background ==
Since the start of 1965, the ARVN 21st Division had been probing the fringes of the U Minh Forest for Vietcong (VC) but rarely had found them. Division commander, Colonel Nguyễn Văn Minh combined an investigation of a reported VC concentration with the movement of supplies to create a helicopter base in Kiên Lương district, a broad flatland crisscrossed by rivers and canals that the VC dominated. The ARVN and United States needed such a base, as the long flight from existing facilities curtailed the amount of time helicopters could spend over the district, portions of which were also out of range of friendly artillery. To implement the action, Minh brought together six battalions, four Regional Forces companies, four platoons of 105mm howitzers, a troop of M113 armored personnel carriers, a Regional Forces boat company, and the 26th River Assault Group. US advisers helped plan and execute the operation, assisted by the US Armys 13th Aviation Battalion and aircraft from the United States Air Force and Republic of Vietnam Air Force (RVNAF).

== Operation ==
The operation began on the morning of 4 April when US helicopters delivered two battalions of infantry to secure the Cái Lớn river. A third battalion marched to the juncture of the river with the Xang Cut canal. There, the soldiers cleared away manmade obstacles and water hyacinth that together blocked the entrance to the canal. The following morning, the 26th River Assault Group steamed along the Cái Lớn from Vị Thanh to Xang Cut, where it took aboard the 2nd Battalion, 31st Infantry. The boats then negotiated their way through the Xang Cut before turning into the Cai Nua canal for the final leg of the journey to Kiên Lương town. In addition to the warships and transports, the flotilla included junks carrying 300 barrels of JP4 aviation fuel, 500 rockets, and other supplies to establish the helicopter base at Kiên Lương. Trailing behind was a fleet of civilian craft that had formed as merchants scrambled to take advantage of the naval protection to engage in commerce.

All went smoothly until 16:20, when a VC 75mm recoilless rifle shattered the calm. The gun critically damaged the lead boat, a landing craft vehicle, personnel (LCVP). Only the quick action of the boat’s commander, who lashed his sinking vessel to trees along the shore, prevented it from blocking the canal. Meanwhile, the VC raked the convoy with fire. The 75mm piece knocked out a patrol boat, and machine-gun fire hit the command monitor. Spotting one of the VC machine guns, a United States Navy adviser engaged it with his carbine until he fell dead from a bullet to the head. Under covering fire from the warships and US Army helicopter gunships, the troopships swung toward shore and debarked the infantry. The action continued until dark, at which point some of the warships escorted the convoy to Kiên Lương town, and the rest remained to support the infantry overnight. In addition to the US Navy officer, the ambush also had cost the South Vietnamese four dead and 24 wounded, with an LCVP and a patrol boat damaged. The allies had killed 70 VC and captured one along with a light machine gun, twelve rifles, and the 75mm recoilless rifle.

With the convoy safe at Kiên Lương, Minh prepared for the operation’s final phase, which was to probe a remote area where intelligence had reported VC units were hiding. Minh adjusted his plans when he learned that one of the battalions he had intended to use had become exhausted by marching through chest-deep water in an attempt to link up with the convoy. Dawn of 6 April found the weary battalion resting, as the 2nd Battalion, 31st Infantry, continued to explore the ambush site along the Cai Nua. Just one battalion and an armored troop advanced in line abreast out of Kiên Lương town toward the target, 15km to the northwest. Two Ranger battalions and US Army helicopter transports sat in readiness at Vị Thanh should a battle develop.

Because the target was outside artillery range, the 1st Battalion, 31st Infantry, and the 4th Troop, 2nd Armored Cavalry, advanced behind a barrage of napalm, bombs, and 20mm cannon fire delivered by aircraft. The movement went smoothly until the end of the sweep, when the M113 troop came upon a fortified base. At 09:25, hostile fire downed an RVNAF A–1H. VC fire on the ground was equally intense. Over the past few months, the VC had refitted with new weapons. The fire, combined with an impassable ditch, stopped an assault by the cavalry troop and a supporting infantry company. Then, at 09:55, VC .50-caliber machine guns shot down two US Army gunships that were trying to prevent the VC from reaching the downed A-1H. Shortly thereafter, a 57mm recoilless rifle punched a hole in an M113, severing the driver’s foot and cutting the vehicle's power. An RPG-2 rocket damaged a second M113, killing a crewman. In both cases, the uninjured crews continued to fight from their vehicles.

Minh reacted to the news of the stalled attack by bringing in the 44th Ranger Battalion in three helicopter lifts between 11:00 and 12:40. Twenty-six US Army UH–1B transports and 19 gunships accomplished the mission. The first lift consisted of the battalion's 1st Company and adviser 1st Lieutenant David W. Bowman. Bowman advanced with the assault force, killing three VC in the process, but hostile fire stopped the attack. As more elements of the Ranger battalion arrived, Bowman moved out into the open to better direct an airstrike when he was killed by VC fire. The 44th Ranger Battalion's senior adviser, Captain Gerard M. Devlin, who had arrived in one of the subsequent lifts, took Bowman's place, directing strike aircraft as well as helicopters brought in to evacuate casualties. An armada of twelve USAF B–57s, 20 A-1Es, and 20 RVNAF A-1Hs pounded the VC until 14:00, when the allies resumed their advance. By 14:30, US helicopters also had delivered about a third of the 42nd Rangers to guard the three downed aircraft. The fighting continued until 17:00, when Minh decided to withdraw. His men were tired and low on supplies, and he was unwilling to have them stay overnight in VC territory without artillery support. Operation Dan Chi 129 had ended.

== Aftermath ==
VC losses were 278 killed, while US losses were six killed.

The US government expressed pleasure with the performance of both the Vietnamese and their advisers. It awarded the 44th Ranger Battalion the Presidential Unit Citation, Bowman the Distinguished Service Cross posthumously and Devlin the Bronze Star Medal.
