= Nguyễn Văn Mạnh =

South Vietnamese general

- Born: March 1, 1921; Thừa Thiên Huế province, French Indochina
- Died: August 26, 1994 (aged 73)
- Allegiance: State of Vietnam; South Vietnam
- Branch: Vietnamese National Army; Army of the Republic of Vietnam
- Service years: 1948 – 25 October 1955 (Vietnamese National Army); 26 October 1955 – 30 April 1975 (Army of the Republic of Vietnam)
- Rank: Lieutenant general
- Commands: IV Corps

Nguyễn Văn Mạnh (1921-1994) was a Lieutenant general in the South Vietnamese Army of the Republic of Vietnam (ARVN).

== Military career ==
In mid-1965 he commanded the 23rd Division.

On 23 November 1966 he was appointed commander of IV Corps, which oversaw the Mekong Delta region, replacing the competent, but corrupt General Đặng Văn Quang. Mạnh was a supporter of General Nguyễn Văn Thiệu.

During the Tet Offensive Mạnh was preoccupied with the security of his headquarters at Cần Thơ Base Camp, rather than commanding his subordinate units throughout his Corps Tactical Zone. On 23 February 1968 he was replaced as IV Corps commander by Lieutenant general Nguyễn Đức Thắng. Mạnh then became the ARVN inspector-general.

In 1969 he was appointed chief of staff of the Joint General Staff (JGS). In March 1974 he was made deputy chairman of the JGS for pacification and development in place of Lieutenant general Nguyen Van La who retired because of old age.

== Awards ==
=== Decorations National ===
- Commander of the National Order of Vietnam

=== Foreign honours ===
- Taiwan :
  - Grand Cordon of the Order of the Cloud and Banner
- Thailand :
  - Knight Grand Cross of the Order of the Crown of Thailand
- South Korea :
  - Order of Military Merit (Chung mu Medal)
- USA :
  - Officer of the Legion of Merit
