= Nguyễn Đức Thắng =

South Vietnamese general (1930–2020)

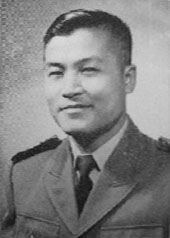
- Nguyễn Đức Thắng
- Born: January 1, 1930; Cao Bằng, French Indochina
- Died: August 1, 2019 (aged 89)
- Allegiance: State of Vietnam; South Vietnam
- Branch: Vietnamese National Army; Army of the Republic of Vietnam
- Service years: September 1951 – 25 October 1955 (Vietnamese National Army); 26 October 1955 – 30 April 1975 (Army of the Republic of Vietnam)
- Rank: Lieutenant general
- Commands: IV Corps

Nguyễn Đức Thắng was a Lieutenant general in the South Vietnamese Army of the Republic of Vietnam (ARVN).

== Military career ==
During the early 1960s, Thắng served as the commanding officer of the ARVN 5th Infantry Division. On 20 December 1962, he was replaced by Nguyễn Văn Thiệu on the orders of President Ngo Dinh Diem.

In mid-1965 he was the ARVN operations chief and a member of the governing military junta led by Nguyễn Cao Kỳ.

In meetings with United States Secretary of Defense Robert McNamara from 28 to 30 November 1965 in Saigon Thắng advised that the South Vietnamese leadership agreed that American and allied (that is, South Korean and Australian) combat units had the "primary mission" of "search and destroy" and a secondary one of defending strategic bases and that South Vietnamese forces, both regulars and territorials, had the primary mission of "pacification" and would operate in populated areas. From a "purely military point of view," Thắng envisioned a South Vietnam divided into two areas: a "populous area... the direct responsibility of the Republic of VN armed forces; the other... the responsibility of U.S. and Allied forces."

Thắng served as Minister of Revolutionary Development which supplied broad administrative guidance for population security and nation-building programs. He also headed a hierarchy of revolutionary development councils, extending from the National Central Revolutionary Development Council in Saigon down through corps- and division-level councils to those in each province.

To Americans, the Vietnamese official most concerned over the entire matter of corruption was Thắng, Kỳ's handpicked minister of revolutionary development. Thoroughly discouraged by 1967, he confided to Edward G. Lansdale, who was then serving as US Ambassador Ellsworth Bunker's assistant, that the army was "far more corrupt than anyone can imagine" and that "the 'Americanization' of the military effort was accepted by many ARVN leaders as an excuse to spend more of their time on personal, selfish affairs." Many of the better Vietnamese commanders had finally succumbed, becoming "playboys," constantly nightclubbing while sitting out the war in Saigon, Da Lat, or some other safe haven. Thắng explained that, beginning rather early in one's military career, the pattern of corruption progressed in an almost standardized fashion. Frustrated with his job, a young officer spent increasing amounts of time at cafes and bars, gradually developing a series of relationships with local mistresses until one became what the Vietnamese called "the second wife." At the same time, to impress and satisfy the needs of both wife and mistress, and his families and friends, the officer gradually began using his position to acquire property, houses, and material goods, all of which demanded a constant supply of cash. The pressing need for money forced the officer to supplement his legitimate earnings with more lucrative, corrupt activities of all sorts. In the process he soon found himself protecting those above and below him engaged in similar practices, both to safeguard and to justify his own actions. He also discovered that managing his financial affairs was a full-time task and spent increasingly less time at his official duties. The need to incorporate family members and friends into the process complicated his affairs further. But the real tragedy, Thắng concluded, was that many officers openly flaunted their wealth and money-making activities, encouraging others to take part and demoralizing those that abstained. To remedy the situation, he recommended a thorough house-cleaning of the upper echelons of the army. The tactical commanders in the field, especially those at regimental and battalion levels, he felt, would support such action and the possibility of a coup was remote. Generals Cao Văn Viên and Nguyễn Văn Vy, Thắng believed, were capable of supplying the drive and leadership for a massive reform effort, but would need considerably more American support in this area than they had been receiving in the past. American attitudes were critical.

Kỳ's relationship with his close friend, Thắng, was complex. Thắng had a reputation for honesty and hard work, which won him not only the respect of his American civilian and military advisers, but also substantial American support for his revolutionary development campaign. But from Ky's point of view, Thắng's political influence was potentially immense. His revolutionary development teams were busy throughout South Vietnam, working in thousands of villages and hamlets, where local army province and district chiefs had little control over their activities. Between Thắng's revolutionary development teams and General Nguyễn Bảo Trị's political warfare cadre, Kỳ had the potential of bypassing the senior military leaders and creating a constituency among the lower-ranking soldiers and the rural peasants in any future bid for political power in Saigon. To further strengthen his political position in 1966, Kỳ also tried to transfer the Territorial Forces command from the Joint General Staff (JGS) to Thắng's Ministry of Revolutionary Development. This ambitious move would have given Thắng control over territorial appointments and promotions, as well as over the training and stationing of these troops. Claiming that the transfer would aid Saigon's national development efforts by forging a closer link between the weakly armed revolutionary development cadre and the territorials, Kỳ secured American support for the reorganization. The senior army leaders, however, were adamantly opposed to the shift. The transfer would have given Kỳ and his adherents too much political power. Although claiming that the proposed realignment would fragment military security efforts in the field, military commanders and province chiefs were primarily concerned with the threat that the proposed change posed to their own authority. Siding with the field commanders, the JGS took the opposite course by transforming the semiautonomous Territorial Forces command into a directorate of the JGS and by establishing separate staff sections for Territorial Forces in each corps headquarters to supervise province and district security forces. The net result was to strengthen, rather than diminish, army control over the territorials.

In July 1967 in an effort to increase his position before the 1967 South Vietnamese presidential election Kỳ proposed that Thắng, be put in charge of an enlarged Political Warfare Department. In this capacity Thắng was to control the Territorial Forces command and have administrative authority over all territorial troops. On 15 August 1967 Kỳ, Viên and Thắng met with COMUSMACV General William Westmoreland, Civil Operations and Revolutionary Development Support (CORDS) Director Robert Komer and Bunker to discuss specific aspects of the reorganization. Ky wanted to make Thắng vice-chief of staff of the army, with responsibility for the Territorial Forces command, the Military Security Service, and the Political Warfare Department while retaining control of the revolutionary development cadre. He also proposed assigning province and district chiefs directly to the political warfare agency under Thắng and having the Military Security Service spearhead a major effort to end corruption in the armed forces. Kỳ again recommended dissolving the division tactical area commands, as well as disbanding several divisions and converting their forces into territorial units. These measures would have removed the division commanders from the area security chain of command and provided more combat units for the provinces and districts. They also would have given an incredible amount of power to Thắng. Bunker and Komer were enthusiastic, but Westmoreland was more circumspect. Having learned about some of the proposals earlier during a private meeting with Vien, he probably realized the political motivations behind the suggestions and declined to support them. He viewed the dissolution of the division tactical area commands too "disruptive" and the formation of a separate Territorial Forces chain of command too" impractical to effectively control or supervise." If transferred to the Defense Ministry, Thắng, he felt, should be a special assistant to Viên rather than a semi-independent vice-chief of staff.

After the Nguyễn Văn Thiệu-Kỳ electoral victory, the military reform and reorganization effort became, if anything, more rather than less political. Kỳ's elaborate schemes to reorganize the Territorial Forces command foundered when Thắng proved reluctant to leave the Revolutionary Development Ministry. Angered by the complete failure of the organizational reform effort, Thắng charged that American advice repeatedly failed to take into consideration either the importance of personalities or the need for a greatly simplified chain of command and that American textbook command and staff procedures, the so-called Leavenworth solution, relied greatly on mutual cooperation and coordination, qualities normally absent in Saigon's politically oriented officer corps. If the Americans really wanted the revolutionary development effort to succeed, they had to put it under a single chief who would not be dependent on the whims of the corps and division commanders to get things done. Making General Phan Trọng Chinh a deputy Corps commander just because he was supposedly "a better pacifier than a fighter" was, Thắng felt, a farce. If Chinh was incompetent, then he ought to be fired. Although Thắng verbally agreed to accept the post of vice-chief for territorial security on the JGS, he remained minister of revolutionary development and never assumed his new staff duties. In November he submitted his resignation and was replaced by General Nguyễn Bảo Trị. Impatient and action-oriented, Thắng would have made a poor partner for the cautious and methodical Thiệu.

On 23 February 1968, following General Nguyễn Văn Mạnh's poor performance as commander of IV Corps during the Tet Offensive and despite supporting Thiệu politically, Thiệu surprisingly replaced him with Thắng. No friend of Thiệu, as revolutionary development minister, he had been habitually frustrated over Saigon's unwillingness to replace corrupt or ineffective officials and had complained loud and often about its neglect of area security. Now as a Corps commander, he had authority to clean up the Mekong Delta. Westmoreland was extremely pleased by the move, calling it "the most important single appointment that has been made in the last year," and for the next few months Thắng proved himself an able military leader as well as a competent civil administrator.

In early July 1968 Thiệu replaced him as IV Corps commander with Major general Nguyễn Viết Thanh.

In 1975, following the end of the war, Nguyễn Đức Thắng left South Vietnam, eventually settling in Greenwich, Connecticut. He died in 2019.
