= Ngô Quang Trưởng =

South Vietnamese Army officer

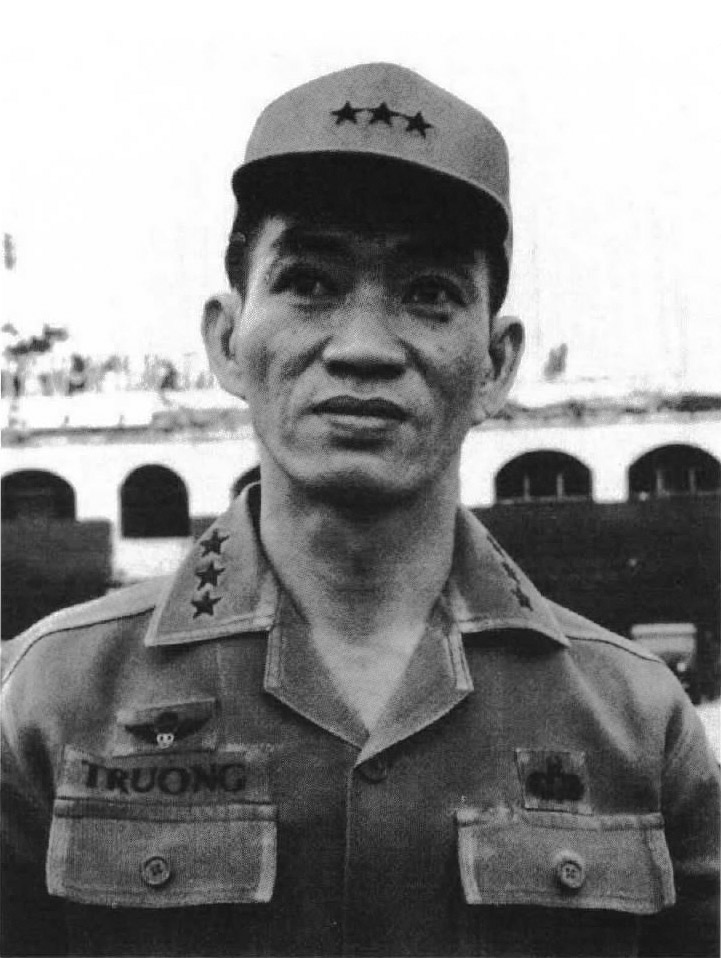
- Trưởng circa 1972
- Born: 13 December 1929; Kiến Hòa, Cochinchina, French Indochina
- Died: 22 January 2007 (aged 77) Falls Church, Virginia, U.S.
- Allegiance: South Vietnam
- Branch: French Army; Vietnamese National Army; Army of the Republic of Vietnam
- Service years: 1954–1975
- Rank: Lieutenant General (Trung Tướng)
- Commands: 1st Division (1966–1970), IV Corps (1970–1972), I Corps (1972–1975)
- Conflicts: Battle of Saigon (1955), Buddhist Uprising, Battle of Huế, Easter Offensive, Hồ Chí Minh Campaign

Ngô Quang Trưởng (13 December 1929 — 22 January 2007) was an officer in the Army of the Republic of Vietnam (ARVN). Trưởng gained his commission in the Vietnamese National Army in 1954 and moved up the ranks over the next decade, mostly in the Airborne Brigade. In 1966, Trưởng commanded a division for the first time after he was given command of the 1st Division after helping to quell the Buddhist Uprising. He rebuilt the unit after this divisive period and used it to reclaim the city of Huế after weeks of bitter street fighting during the Tết Offensive.

In 1972, he was made the commander of I Corps after incompetent leadership by General Hoàng Xuân Lãm resulted in a South Vietnamese collapse in the face of the Easter Offensive, a massive conventional invasion by North Vietnam. He stabilized the ARVN forces before turning back the communists.

In 1975, the communists attacked again. This time, President Nguyễn Văn Thiệu gave contradictory orders to Trưởng as to whether he should stand and fight or give up some territory and consolidate. This led to the demoralization of I Corps and its collapse, allowing the communists to gather momentum and overrun South Vietnam within two months. Trưởng fled South Vietnam during the fall of Saigon and settled in Virginia in the United States.

== Early years and military beginnings ==
Trưởng was born in 1929 to a wealthy family in the Mekong Delta province of Kiến Hòa (now Bến Tre Province). At the time, Vietnam was part of French Indochina. After graduating from Mỹ Tho College, a French colonial-run school in the Mekong Delta provincial town of Mỹ Tho, Trưởng attended the reserve officer school at Thủ Đức in Saigon, and was commissioned as an infantry officer in the Vietnamese National Army in 1954. Upon graduation from Thủ Đức, Trưởng went immediately on to airborne school at the Command and Staff School of the Vietnamese National Military Academy at Đà Lạt. He served in the elite airborne brigade the next 12 years. His first posting was as commander of 1st Company, 5th Airborne Battalion.

After graduating from Đà Lạt, he soon saw action in a 1955 operation to eliminate the Bình Xuyên river pirates who were vying with President Diệm's government for control of Saigon and the surrounding area. In recognition of his performance against the Bình Xuyên, Trưởng was promoted to first lieutenant. When the Republic of Vietnam was created in 1955, the VNA became the Army of the Republic of Vietnam (ARVN).

== Rising through the ranks ==
In 1964, Trưởng was promoted to major and made commander of the 5th Airborne Battalion. He led a heliborne assault into Đỗ Xá Secret Zone in Minh Long District, Quảng Ngãi Province, in central Vietnam. This attack destroyed the base area of the Việt Cộng's (VC) B-1 Front Headquarters. In 1965, Trưởng led the 5th Airborne Battalion on a helicopter assault into the Hát Dịch Secret Zone in the vicinity of the Ong Trinh Mountain in Phước Tuy Province southeast of Saigon, the base area of the VC 7th Division. In two days of fighting, Trưởng's 5th Battalion inflicted heavy casualties on two VC regiments, and he was awarded a battlefield promotion to lieutenant colonel and the National Defense Medal, Fourth Class. After the battle, Trưởng became chief of staff of the Airborne Brigade and then became chief of staff of the division later in the year. His reputation for valour and fairness gained the attention of the senior generals in Saigon. General Cao Văn Viên, chief of the Joint General Staff from 1965 to 1975, later described Trưởng as "one of the best commanders at every echelon the Airborne Division ever had."

In 1966, the Buddhist Uprising broke out in central Vietnam with Buddhists protested military control of the government. Trưởng was asked to quell the rebellious 1st Division in Huế, which had decided to stop military operations against the VC in solidarity with the Buddhist protest movement. A Buddhist, Trưởng, was uncomfortable with his mission, but he carried out his orders. On 18 June, he commanded three airborne battalions that entered the city and restored order within two days and he put the 1st Division under government control.

== General ==
As a result of his efficient display, Saigon made Trưởng's appointment as 1st Division commander permanent. With his hands-on leadership, Trưởng quickly moulded the unit, which had a poor reputation prior to his arrival, and had been heavily weakened by the infighting of the past year, into one of the best units in the ARVN. Trưởng handpicked his leading subordinate officers and put his battalions in the hands of majors who had many years of combat experience. Unlike most, he eschewed politics in choosing his officers, and implemented new training programs to improve the capability of his troops and Regional (RF) and Popular Forces (PF) that augmented them. Trưởng's dedication to his unit and leadership significantly raised the morale of his subordinates. As part of his strategy of better integrating the territorial forces with the regular army, Trưởng had his battalion commanders act as district chiefs, who normally worked only with the territorial forces. As a result, the regulars began to coordinate their pacification campaigns more effectively with the paramilitary forces. In 1967, Trưởng's 1st Division assaulted and dismantled the VC infrastructure and a large part of their fighters from the Luong Co-Dong Xuyen-My Xa Front in Hương Trà District in Thừa Thiên-Huế Province. Trưởng was rewarded with a promotion to brigadier general.

During the Tết Offensive, Trưởng led the 1st Division in the Battle of Huế as the People's Army of Vietnam (PAVN) and VC were expelled from the old imperial city after three weeks of bitter street fighting. Following the famous victory in the citadel, Trưởng was given a second star and made a major general. In August 1970, he was assigned to command IV Corps, which oversaw the Mekong Delta region. He was based at the Corps' headquarters in Cần Thơ. General Creighton Abrams, the head of American forces in Vietnam, recommended Trưởng to President Nguyễn Văn Thiệu, saying, "I can recommend, without any reservations at all ... Trưởng. I think he's proved over and over and in all facets — pacification, military operations, whatever it is". He was promoted to lieutenant general in June 1971.

== Corps commander ==
During his tenure in the Mekong Delta, Trưởng established a system of outposts along the border with Cambodia to block infiltration of PAVN/VC personnel and supplies into the region. He used the three divisions in his Corps in regimental-sized combined arms task forces and staged sweeps to seek and destroy PAVN/VC forces in their strongholds. He increased the capability of the RF/PF, which had a reputation for unreliability in his area, making them a productive part of his anti-PAVN/VC apparatus. Trưởng later said that these forces "shed their paramilitary origins and increasingly became full-fledged soldiers". It was estimated that although they provided 50% of the manpower, the RF and PF cost only 5% of total military costs. During his period in charge of IV Corps, the region's regular forces were depleted because a proportion of them were across the border as part of the Cambodian Campaign, seeking to destroy PAVN/VC jungle bases, supplies and staging grounds for an invasion into South Vietnam.

Trưởng used the RF/PF that he had enhanced to fill the void, and they strengthened the government control in the region despite having nominally less resources. In the forests surrounding U Minh, Trưởng's outpost building programs resulted in a record number of defectors as the populace became more confident in his forces' ability to provide security. When American Ambassador Ellsworth Bunker came to inspect an outlying military base that Trưởng had built, he asked if the general intended to stay there. Trưởng replied "Yes, forever". Trưởng was so successful in pacifying the Mekong Delta that he allowed some of his forces to be redeployed to other parts of South Vietnam.

Known for his unbending integrity, Trưởng vigorously moved against "ghost" and "ornamental" soldiers, deserters and conscription evaders in his region. Abrams said that only Trưởng and Phạm Văn Phú among the division and corps commanders had not begun to psychologically crack under the pressure of the PAVN onslaught.

During the PAVN's Easter Offensive of 1972, in early May he was given command of I Corps, replacing the disgraced Lieutenant General Hoàng Xuân Lãm. Trưởng held PAVN forces at bay before Huế and then launched (against the initial resistance of President Nguyễn Văn Thiệu and MACV) Operation Lam Son 72. During the counteroffensive, he successfully pushed PAVN forces back to the city of Quang Tri (which was retaken in September) and advanced on to the Cửa Việt river.

== Collapse of South Vietnam ==
Trưởng remained in command of I Corps until the collapse of South Vietnam, when the north of the country lapsed into anarchy amid confused leadership by President Thiệu. I Corps fielded three infantry divisions, the elite Airborne and Marine Divisions, four Ranger Groups and an armored brigade. Until mid-March, due to Trưởng's highly effective leadership, the PAVN had only tried to cut the highways, despite having five divisions and 27 further regiments far outnumbering Trưởng's men. At a meeting on 13 March, Trưởng and the new III Corps commander, Lieutenant General Nguyễn Văn Toàn briefed Thiệu. By this time, South Vietnam was suffering from severe cutbacks in US aid, and the loss of Ban Mê Thuột in the central highlands, which threatened to split the country in two and isolate Trưởng's I Corps from the rest of the country. Thiệu laid out his plan to consolidate a smaller proportion of territory so that the forces could more effectively defend the area. As Trưởng understood it, he was free to redeploy his forces south to hold Đà Nẵng, South Vietnam's second largest city, thereby abandoning Huế. Fearful of and preoccupied with stopping a coup, Thiệu also decided to remove the Airborne and Marines to Saigon, leaving I Corps exposed.

Thiệu called Trưởng to Saigon on 19 March to brief him on the withdrawal plan. Trưởng intended to order a retreat to Huế, Đà Nẵng and Chu Lai, and then move all the forces to Đà Nẵng to regroup and dig in. Thiệu then stunned Trưởng by announcing that he had misinterpreted his previous orders: Huế was not to be abandoned, despite losing two divisions in recent days. In the meantime, the withdrawal preparations and the increasing North Vietnamese pressure caused civilians to flee in fear, clogging the highway and hampering the withdrawal. Trưởng requested permission to withdraw his forces into the three enclaves as planned; Thiệu ordered him to "hold onto any territory he could with whatever forces he now had, including the Marine Division", implying that he could retreat if needed. Trưởng returned to Đà Nẵng to be greeted by the start of a PAVN offensive. President Thiệu made a nationwide radio broadcast that afternoon proclaiming that Huế would be held "at all costs", contradicting the previous order. That evening Trưởng ordered a retreat to a new defense line at the Mỹ Chánh River to defend Huế, thereby ceding all of Quảng Trị Province. He was confident that his forces could hold Huế, but was then astounded by a late afternoon message from Thiệu that ordered "that because of inability to simultaneously defend all three enclaves, the I Corps commander was free ... to redeploy his forces for the defense of Đà Nẵng only." The people of Quảng Trị and Huế began to leave their homes by the hundreds of thousands, joining an ever-growing exodus toward Đà Nẵng.

Meanwhile, the PAVN closed in on Đà Nẵng amid the chaos caused by Thiệu's confused leadership. Within a few days I Corps was beyond control. The South Vietnamese tried to evacuate from the other urban enclaves into Đà Nẵng, but the 1st Division collapsed after its commander, Brigadier General Nguyễn Văn Điềm, angered by Thiệu's abandonment, told his men, "We've been betrayed ... It is now sauve qui peut (every man for himself) ... [S]ee you in Đà Nẵng." The overland march, pummeled by PAVN artillery the entire way, degenerated into chaos as the 1st Division descended into anarchy as it moved toward Đà Nẵng. The remainder of the force deserted or began looting. Only a minority survived and some disillusioned officers committed suicide.

As anarchy and looting enveloped Đà Nẵng, and a defense of the city becoming impossible, Trưởng requested permission to evacuate by sea, but Thiệu, baffled, refused to make a decision. When his communications with Saigon were sundered by PAVN shelling, Trưởng ordered a naval withdrawal, as Thiệu was not making a decision either way.

With no support or leadership from Thiệu, the evacuation turned into a costly debacle, as the PAVN pounded the city with artillery, killing thousands of people. Many drowned while jostling for room on the boats; with no logistical support from Saigon, those vessels sent were far too few for the millions of would-be evacuees. Only around 16,000 soldiers were pulled out, and of the almost two million civilians that packed Đà Nẵng, a little more than 50,000 were evacuated. As a result, 70,000 troops were taken prisoner, along with around 100 aircraft. Trưởng and his officers swam to a boat in the sea and evacuated to Saigon. In quick succession the remaining cities along the coastline collapsed and half the country had fallen in two weeks.

Upon arriving in Saigon, Trưởng was appointed deputy chairman of the Joint General Staff and given responsibility for organizing the defense of Saigon, however he found the area was too large and difficult to be defended with the forces available.

Trưởng was reportedly hospitalized for a nervous breakdown. An American officer who had worked closely with him heard of Trưởng's plight, and arranged for his family to leave on an American ship amid the chaos of the fall of Saigon and the PAVN takeover of South Vietnam. Truong fled Vietnam with former Vice President Nguyễn Cao Kỳ by helicopter on the morning of 30 April 1975, the day of the fall of Saigon.

== Life in the United States ==
Trưởng's family was initially broken up amid the confusion. His wife and eldest son ended up in Fort Chaffee, Arkansas, while his two daughters and second son fled Saigon with a US State Department employee to Seattle. Trưởng's youngest son, aged four, ended up at Camp Pendleton, California; the toddler did not speak English and was not identified for a few weeks. After his family was fully accounted for, Trưởng relocated with them to Falls Church, Virginia.

In 1983, he became an American citizen and moved to Springfield, Virginia. He studied computer programming at Northern Virginia Community College and worked as a computer analyst for the Association of American Railroads for a decade until he retired in 1994.

Trưởng wrote several military history works commissioned by the United States Army Center of Military History, as part of its Indochina Monographs series. These were The Easter Offensive of 1972 (1979), RVNAF and US Operational Cooperation and Coordination (1980) and Territorial Forces (1981).

== Death ==
Trưởng died of cancer on 22 January 2007, at the Inova Fairfax Hospital in Falls Church, Virginia. At the time of his death, Trưởng was survived by his wife, three sons, two daughters, twelve grandchildren and two great-grandchildren. After his death, the Virginia House of Delegates and Senate passed a joint resolution "Celebrating the Life of Ngo Quang Truong".

== Assessment ==
Trưởng was widely regarded as South Vietnam's finest officer, and the US officers that worked with him generally rated him to be superior to most American commanders. He was also renowned for his integrity and his uninvolvement in corruption, favoritism or political cronyism, as well as his empathy and solidarity with his soldiers. William Westmoreland, the US commander in Vietnam from 1964 to 1968, said that Trưởng "would rate high on any list of capable South Vietnamese leaders ... [other U.S. commanders] so admired Trưởng that they would trust him to command an American division." His successor Creighton Abrams, who oversaw the American war effort until 1972, said that Trưởng "was capable of commanding an American division".

Lieutenant General John H. Cushman, and his main subordinate, Lieutenant General Richard G. Stilwell, who operated alongside Trưởng in I Corps in the 1960s said that because of Trưởng's efforts, the ARVN 1st Division was "equal to any American unit". General Bruce Palmer Jr. said that Trưởng was "probably the best field commander in South Vietnam." In 1966, Trưởng's American adviser wrote to General Harold K. Johnson, describing the Vietnamese officer as "dedicated, humble, imaginative and tactically sound."

General Norman Schwarzkopf, who commanded US forces during the Gulf War against Iraq in 1991, served as Trưởng's adviser in the 1960s when he was deployed to South Vietnam as a major during a campaign at Ia Drang. He wrote in his autobiography It Doesn't Take A Hero, that Trưởng "did not look like my idea of a military genius: only five feet seven ... very skinny, with hunched shoulders and a head that seemed too big for his body ... His face was pinched and intense ... and there was always a cigarette hanging from his lips. Yet he was revered by his officers and troops—and feared by those North Vietnamese commanders who knew of his ability." Schwarzkopf said that Trưởng was "the most brilliant tactical commander I'd ever known" and that "by visualizing the terrain and drawing on his experience fighting the enemy for fifteen years, Truong showed an uncanny ability to predict what they were going to do".

Lieutenant Colonel James H. Willbanks, who served in Vietnam and was a professor of military history at the United States Army Command and General Staff College, said of Trưởng:

A humble man, Truong was an unselfish individual devoted to his profession. He was fiercely loyal to his subordinates, and was known for taking care of his soldiers, often flying through heavy fire to stand with them in the rain and mud during enemy attacks. He treated everyone the same and did not play favorites.

Unlike some South Vietnamese generals who had grown rich as they ascended the ranks, Trưởng was regarded as being completely incorruptible and lived a "spartan and ascetic" life. According to Lieutenant General Cushman, Trưởng did not own a suit, and by the time he was appointed to command IV Corps, his wife tended to pigs, which were kept behind his basic living quarters in the headquarters at Cần Thơ. Cushman added that Trưởng was always looking for means to raise his soldiers' material and family lives. Trưởng did not tolerate favoritism. He once received a request to transfer his nephew from the front line to a desk job; he refused and the nephew later was killed in action. General Bruce Palmer Jr., said Trưởng "deserved a better fate" than the mauling of his soldiers amid Thiệu's confused orders and the collapse of South Vietnam.
