= 21st Division (South Vietnam) =

21st Infantry Division
- Sư đoàn 21
- 21st Division SSI
- Active: 1959–1975
- Country: South Vietnam
- Branch: Army of the Republic of Vietnam
- Part of: IV Corps
- Garrison/HQ: Chương Thiện
- March: "Sư Đoàn 21 Bộ Binh Hành Khúc"
- Engagements: Vietnam War: Battle of An Lộc

Commanders
- Notable commanders: Đặng Văn Quang; Nguyễn Văn Minh; Nguyễn Vĩnh Nghi; Lê Văn Hưng

The 21st Division (Vietnamese: Sư đoàn 21; Chữ Hán: 師團21) of the Army of the Republic of Vietnam (ARVN)—the army of the nation state of South Vietnam that existed from 1959 to 1975, was part of the IV Corps that oversaw the southernmost region of South Vietnam, the Mekong Delta. The 21st Division was based in Chương Thiện province, the southernmost province in the whole country, in an area dominated by jungles and swamps.

== History ==
The 21st Infantry Division was formed in 1960 from the disbanded 11th and 13th Light Divisions and their personnel and equipment assigned to the new Division; the commander and staff of the 11th Light Division became the commanding general and headquarters elements of the new unit. The old headquarters of the 13th Light Division in Tây Ninh became the rear headquarters of the Division.

The Division was responsible for the southwestern delta with an area of operations including Phong Dinh, Ba Xuyen, Bạc Lieu, An Xuyên and Chương Thiện provinces and the southern half of Kiên Giang province, including the province capital, Rạch Giá. Controlled by Military Region 3, four enemy regiments operated against the Division: the Viet Cong (VC) D1 Regiment in Phong Dinh and the People's Army of Vietnam (PAVN) D2, 95A Sapper and 18B Regiments in Chương Thiện.

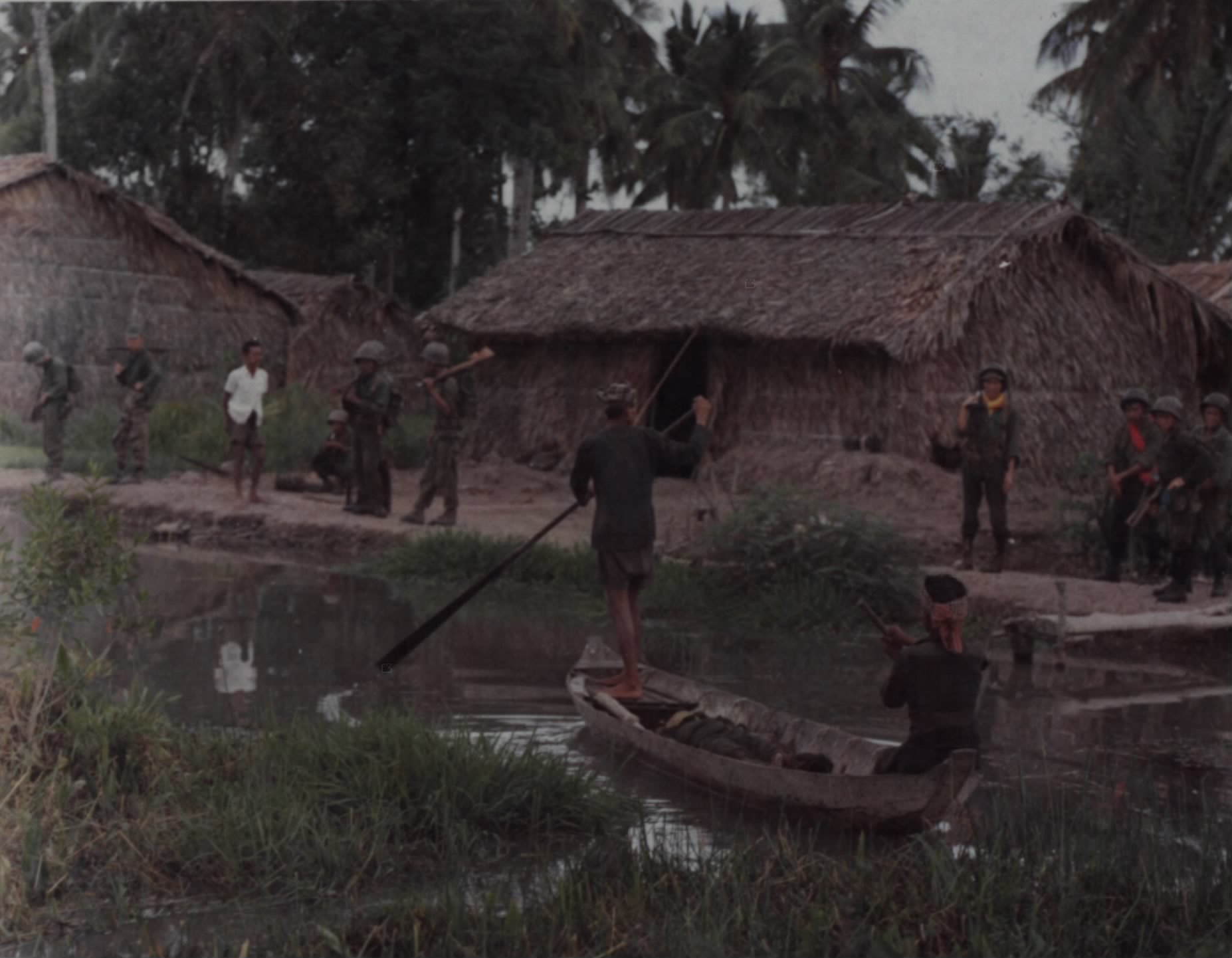
A dead lieutenant from the 1st Battalion, 31st Infantry is transported by sampan following an ambush near Vị Thanh, Chương Thiện province, 22 July 1964

On 24 April 1962 the Division, supported by 16 Marine helicopters from HMM-362, conducted Operation Nightingale near Cần Thơ. 591 Division troops were landed to engage a VC force killing 70 and capturing three, while losing three killed.

=== 1964 ===
On 26 April the VC attacked a Civil Guard post near Kiên Lương district. The Division responded with three infantry battalions, an M113 armored personnel carrier troop, and a Civil Guard company. The operation continued for two days. Sixty-two VC were killed, and air force pilots claimed to have killed another 47. Four VC were captured together with a 57mm recoilless rifle, a .50-caliber machine gun, and seven other weapons. Allied losses were 11 dead (including one US advisor), 43 wounded, and two M113s damaged.

In June Brigadier general Đặng Văn Quang became the Division commander. Quang was highly rated by his US senior adviser and was promoted to Major general in November.

On 22 July the VC ambushed a 1st Battalion, 31st Infantry convoy in Chương Thiện Province as they moved through an area of paddy fields and mangrove swamps from Vi Thanh to relieve the outpost at Xang Cut. ARVN losses were 41 killed, 55 wounded and 31 missing, while US losses were one missing and one wounded. South Vietnamese President Nguyễn Khánh described the incident as "a day of shame."

On 3 October the 2nd Battalion, 33rd Infantry launched Operation Dan Chi in An Xuyên province. As the troops riding M113s advanced on the hamlet of Tan Duc they flushed a VC company out into the open. Twelve US helicopters landed 56 Rangers to engage an estimated 150 VC. The VC fought the Rangers, who were supported US Army gunships, until nightfall when the VC withdrew. The allies found 46 VC dead and took 37 prisoners and captured 24 weapons. The Rangers suffered two wounded. The operation continued for another two days, generating little contact.

On 2 November during a division operation to relieve the VC blockade of Năm Căn, the VC attacked Khai Quang post, 20km northwest of Cà Mau. The 44th Ranger Battalion was deployed by helicopter to the area and, supported by US Army gunships, cleared out VC fortifications killing 56 VC and capturing a 60mm mortar and 26 individual weapons for the loss of one dead and 16 wounded and one US door gunner killed.

On 5 December the division attacked the VC U Minh 2 Battalion about 15km northeast of Ca Mau. Allied forces killed 115 VC and captured three 60mm mortars, five heavy machine guns, and 51 individual weapons. The ARVN lost 25 dead and 66 wounded.

On 8 December a 33rd Infantry battalion made an amphibious landing near Hà Tiên to look for VC. It advanced toward a cement plant before camping for the night. Although the unit secured its front, it neglected to guard the seacoast to its rear. Fifty VC infiltrated the camp from the coast and penetrated the command post. They killed the entire three-man US advisory team, the battalion commander, and eight other soldiers while they slept and wounded another ten soldiers before escaping.

On 11 December the VC D2 Regiment along with a reinforcing unit, four battalions in all, assaulted Long My town in Chuong Thien province. The territorial defenders held as the VC set three ambushes for the relief forces. After mauling a division battalion sent toward Long My, the VC returned to attack the town. Once again, the defenders repelled the enemy. Eighteen US and Republic of Vietnam Air Force (RVNAF) A-1s provided air support, with the VC shooting down one and damaging three. They also damaged five US Army helicopters. Allied pilots claimed they had killed 400 insurgents. The ARVN lost 27 dead and 55 wounded. US losses were two dead, five wounded, and one missing.

=== 1965 ===
In January 1965 Quang was promoted to commander of IV Corps and Colonel Nguyen Van Phuoc was given command of the Division.

On 22 January responding to reports of VC activity 14km southeast of Bạc Liêu, the Division deployed a company from the 42nd Ranger Battalion by US helicopters to the area. Following airstrikes, the Rangers encircled and then overran the VC. VC losses were 51 killed, 26 captured, 19 suspects detained and 27 weapons captured. ARVN casualties were three dead and seven wounded.

On 25 March the Division conducted an air assault operation 20km southwest of Vị Thanh. Two helicopters were damaged by VC fire in the initial landing. The troops failed to make significant contact but the next day they killed 70 VC, captured 20 and captured more than 1,360 kilograms of materiel.

On 13 May the Division was operating in Bạc Liêu province, when a US Army observation plane spotted 50 VC about 60km to the east at Thanh Thoi An hamlet, 18km southeast of Soc Trang. A US helicopter gunship platoon and a command-and-control helicopter investigating the area received heavy fire from the preferred landing zone. The first unit of the 42nd Ranger Battalion was landed at an alternate landing zone and quickly came under attack. Throughout the afternoon, US helicopters delivered the rest of the 42nd Rangers, two understrength battalions of the 33rd Infantry, the Division's reconnaissance company, and a 4.2-inch mortar platoon. When part of the VC line collapsed, the Rangers poured a devastating fire on the fleeing soldiers from close range. The remaining VC held their ground until 22:00, when they finally cracked under assault. A full moon and a clear sky allowed aircraft to harry the VC as they ran through the open paddies. The pursuit continued until 02:00 on the 14th. VC losses were 174 killed, nine captured and a mortar, a recoilless rifle, two machine guns, four automatic rifles, and 56 individual firearms. ARVN losses were 17 killed and 41 wounded. Five Americans were injured, and four gunships suffered damage.

On 23 May due to VC harassment of the Khai Quang outpost in An Xuyen province, the 3rd Battalion, 32nd Infantry was sent to relieve the post. The battalion left a company at the post, and then began its march home when the VC ambushed it. ARVN losses were 36 killed, 42 wounded, 17 missing, and 51 weapons lost. One US adviser was killed.

On 27 May the 33rd Infantry Regiment and the 43rd Ranger Battalion, a reconnaissance company, and an M113 troop encircled a VC battalion in Phong Dinh Province, 21km northwest of Soc Trang. VC losses were 96 killed, and 26 captured and 29 weapons. ARVN losses were ten dead and 52 wounded.

On 8 June the Division attacked an entrenched VC force in Phong Dinh that was larger and better armed than planners had anticipated. Fierce fighting lasted all day and into the night. After dark, the VC broke out of the encirclement by overrunning the 2nd Battalion, 33rd Infantry. ARVN losses were 60 dead and 74 wounded, 17 missing, and 99 individual weapons, a mortar, and two light machine guns lost. VC losses were 86 killed, 21 captured and two tons of ammunition captured.

On 4 July following reports of a reinforced VC battalion 10km north of Vĩnh Châu, Bac Lieu province, the Division launched an attack involving three infantry and two ranger battalions, a reconnaissance company. The battle continued until dark, but by the morning of the 5th, the VC were gone. The VC left behind 212 dead, 19 prisoners, 33 individual weapons, and two mortars. ARVN losses were 14 dead and 30 wounded. US losses were one dead and four wounded and one O-1B shot down.

By the end of 1965 the US advisers to the Division regarded Division commander General Nguyễn Văn Minh highly, and they reported that the Division was "getting more aggressive" and had "a good potential not yet fully realized."

=== 1966–1971 ===
By 1967 Brigadier general William Robertson Desobry, the US senior adviser in IV Corps, considered the division under Minh the best in the ARVN and the 9th Division not far behind. However the senior US officer there, Major general George S. Eckhardt, had recommended his dismissal, noting that he was "very temperamental and has frequently requested relief when under stress or when at odds with [the] Corps commander." Minh's close friendship with President Nguyễn Văn Thiệu brought him command of the Capital Military District in 1968.

On 5 March 1968 the Division together with Regional Forces killed 275 VC and captured 61 weapons north of Cà Mau Airfield.

On 19 October 1969 the 32nd Regiment supported by helicopter gunships from the US 164th Combat Aviation Group engaged a PAVN/VC force in the U Minh Forest 37 miles (60 km) south of Rạch Giá. At 11:00 another Division unit supported the fighting which continued until mid-afternoon when the PAVN/VC withdrew leaving 96 dead and 15 individual and six crew-served weapons and 145 Rocket-propelled grenades. An AH-1 Cobra was shot down during the battle.

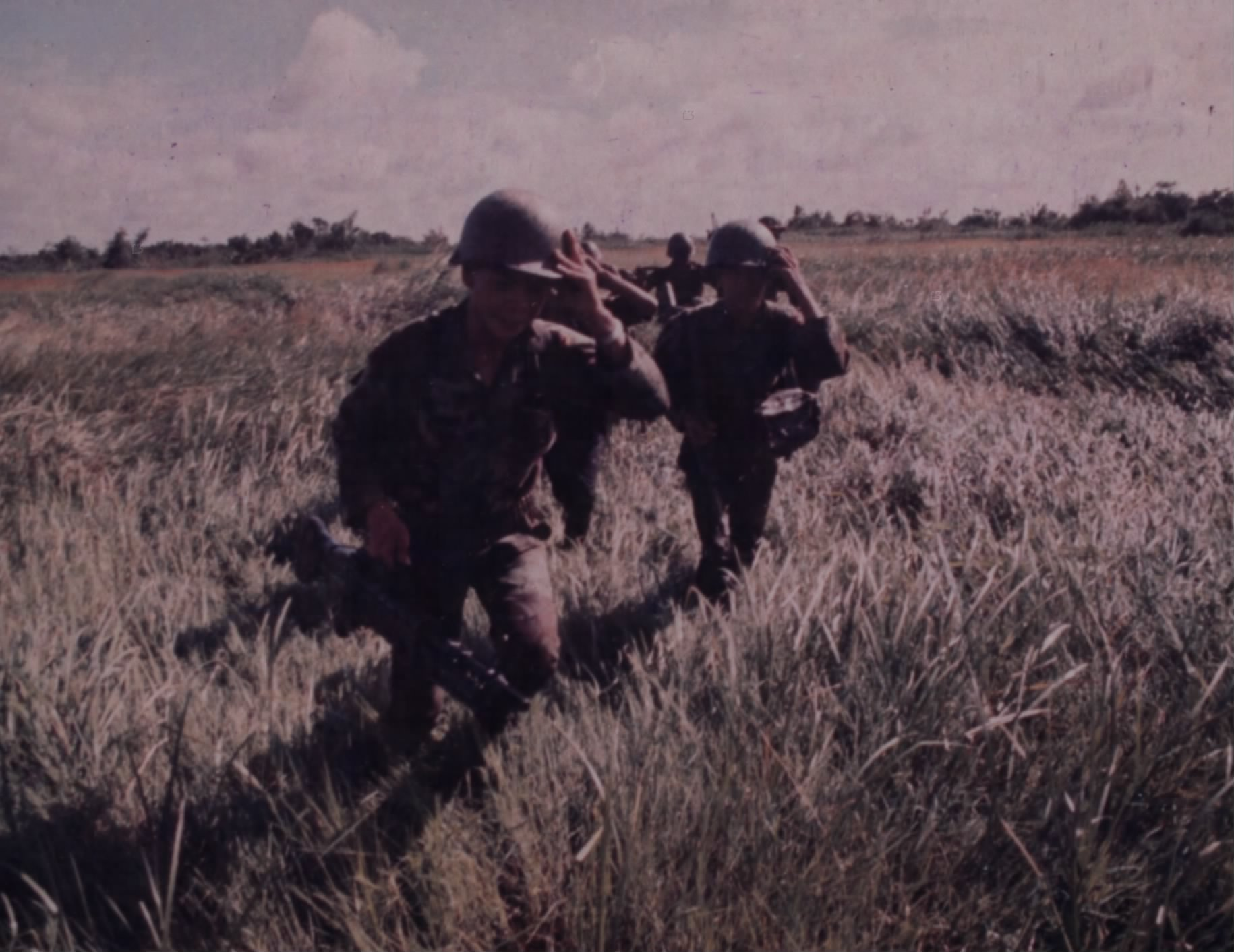
Division soldiers run toward waiting helicopters, 1970

In January 1970 John Paul Vann at the request of Ambassador Ellsworth Bunker produced his own evaluations of IV Corps' commanders which differed markedly from the official judgments of MACV. Vann recommended all three division commanders and the special zone commander for relief, however only the 7th Division commander was replaced.

During 1971 the Division focused on destruction of the PAVN/VC Base Area 483 in the U Minh Forest.

=== 1972–1975 ===
On 7 April 1972 at the start of the Easter Offensive the Division was alerted for movement to III Corps to support units of that Corps fighting in the Battle of An Lộc. On 10 April the first elements of this division were already deployed to Lai Khê. On 12 April a relief force of the 32nd Regiment departed Lai Khê to reopen Route 13 to Chơn Thành Camp 30 km (19 mi) south of An Lộc. After making slow progress, on 22 April the 32nd Regiment encountered a roadblock of the PAVN 101st Regiment 15 km (9.3 mi) north of Lai Khê. From 24 April the Division engaged the PAVN in a two-pronged attack to clear the road with the 32nd Regiment attacking from the north and the 33rd Regiment attacking from the south. These attacks eventually forced the 101st Regiment to withdraw west on 27 April leaving one battalion to cover the withdrawal for a further 2 days. The 31st Regiment was then lifted by helicopters 6 km (3.7 mi) north of Chơn Thành where it fought the PAVN 165th Regiment, 7th Division, later reinforced by the 209th Regiment, for the next 13 days. Eventually on 13 May with intensive air support the 31st Regiment overran the PAVN positions and extended ARVN control to 8 km (5.0 mi) north of Chơn Thành. The 32nd Regiment then deployed into the Tau O area (11.514°N 106.614°E) a further 5 km (3.1 mi) north where they ran into the 209th Regiment's well-prepared blocking positions which stopped the Division's advance for 38 days despite extensive artillery and air support including B-52 strikes. This stalemate would continue until the PAVN withdrew from An Lộc. In mid-July the Division was replaced by the 25th Division and they completed the destruction of the remaining PAVN strongpoints by 20 July. Following the battle General Nguyễn Vĩnh Nghi was replaced as Division commander by an Airborne officer.

In June 1973, the Division was given a new commander, Brigadier general Lê Văn Hưng, who had done well at An Lộc. Although Hưng had nowhere to bring the Division but up, progress was slow. He gradually replaced ineffective subordinates with combat-proven officers, many from Airborne and Ranger units, and observers noted some improvements in morale and combat effectiveness. Hưng employed the 15th Regiment, under his operational control from the 9th Division, exclusively in Long Mỹ District of Chương Thiện, while his three organic regiments, the 31st, 32nd and 33rd, operated throughout the rest of Chương Thiện and northern An Xuyên. The 32nd and 33rd had few contacts with the enemy, other than receiving attacks by fire; but in late December, the 3rd Battalion, 31st Regiment was ambushed while marching to the relief of an RF outpost, and more than 100 of its men were killed.

In April 1975, while the PAVN 1975 Spring Offensive overran much of the country, the Division protected Binh Thuy Air Base, the Arc Road Line at outer Cần Thơ, the ferry crossing between Cần Thơ-Bình Minh, Vĩnh Long province and the provincial capitals at An Xuyen (Cà Mau), Chuong Thien (Hậu Giang), Rạch Giá (Kiên Giang), Bạc Liêu and Ba Xuyen (Sóc Trăng).

On the early morning of 30 April 1975, several RVNAF helicopters launched airstrikes to stop the VC from taking sections of the Arc Road Line. Later that morning President Dương Văn Minh announced the unconditional surrender to North Vietnam by radio. Hưng was upset about the surrender order and proposed that ARVN unit could retreat into the delta to continue fighting. Division soldiers retreated from the Arc Line to defend central Cần Thơ, but Hưng changed his mind and ordered them not to defend the city because of fears of the destruction that would result. At 20:00, the VC 9th Military Region representatives demanded the surrender of all ARVN units by the morning of 1 May. At 20:45 Hưng committed suicide at his home rather than surrender. On the morning of 1 May IV Corps commander Major general Nguyễn Khoa Nam committed suicide at his headquarters. The Division was effectively disbanded on 1 May 1975.

== Organisation ==
Component units:

- 31st Infantry Regiment
- 32nd Infantry Regiment
- 33rd Infantry Regiment
- 210th, 211th, 212th and 213th Artillery Battalions
- 9th Armored Cavalry Squadron
- US Advisory Team 51
