= Đặng Văn Quang =

South Vietnam General and National Security Advisor

Personal details
- Born: 21 June 1929 Ba Xuyen Province, Cochinchina, French Indochina
- Died: 15 July 2011 (aged 82) Sacramento, California, U.S.
- Party: National Social Democratic Front
- Relatives: Nguyễn Thị Mai Anh (niece); Nguyễn Văn Thiệu (nephew-in-law)
- Military career
- Allegiance: State of Vietnam; Republic of Vietnam
- Branch: Vietnamese National Army; Army of the Republic of Vietnam
- Service years: 1949–1975
- Rank: Lieutenant General
- Commands: 21st Division (1964–1965); IV Corps (1965–1966)
- Other work: Special Advisor on Military Affairs (1968–1969); Advisor of National Security and Intelligence (1969–1975)

Lieutenant General Đặng Văn Quang (21 June 1929 – 15 July 2011) popularly known as Fat Quang, was an officer of the Army of the Republic of Vietnam who served as a special advisor to President Nguyễn Văn Thiệu of South Vietnam.

== Biography ==
Quang started as a non-commissioned officer (NCO) in the French colonial army and was later promoted to Emperor Bảo Đại’s aide-de-camp, then commander of his personal Imperial Guard. He also was in charge of managing resources for Thiệu. This led to his promotion to Brigadier general.

He commanded the 21st Division from 1 June 1964, until 20 January 1965, when he was promoted to the rank of Lieutenant general, receiving two further stars.

He then served as the commander of IV Corps, which oversaw the Mekong Delta region of the country, replacing Thiệu, who went on to become head of state. COMUSMACV General William Westmoreland considered him to be "an excellent corps commander and leader." According to common rumors, Quang had "a virtual monopoly on the economic life of the Delta," ran a "brisk trade in rice and opium," and had amassed a small fortune through official corruption. His senior adviser, Colonel George Barton, denied the allegations but admitted that Quang's wife and brother ran a club that catered to both Vietnamese and Americans.

On 23 November 1966, at the urging of Prime Minister Nguyễn Cao Kỳ he was replaced as IV Corps commander by Major General Nguyen Van Manh. The American position on Quang was ambivalent, he had proved an excellent Corps commander and Westmoreland was reluctant to see him go. Yet Kỳ's charge of corruption appeared to be accurate; Quang had amassed considerable wealth through the sale of offices, furthering the financial interests of his wife and relatives. Westmoreland later urged Thiệu to bring Quang to trial for his alleged corruption, but Thiệu demurred, noting the absence of evidence and the chance that the former corps commander might be acquitted and the government embarrassed.

Following Thiệu's election as President in September 1967 he served as Minister of Planning. On 18 April 1968 Thiệu appointed him as special assistant for military affairs and security. He then served as advisor on national security and intelligence from 1969 to 1975.

According to Frank Snepp, Quang became an important source of information for the Central Intelligence Agency (CIA) inside the South Vietnamese government and was well rewarded for this. However following the Battle of Ban Me Thuot in March 1975 he failed to inform the CIA of Thiệu's plan to abandon the Central Highlands, jeopardizing the evacuation of Americans and their South Vietnamese staff.

He was not popular with the people of South Vietnam and had a reputation for corruption. He was accused of being the most corrupt officer in South Vietnam. As the North Vietnamese overran the South in 1975 Đăng was reported to charge a US$5,000 bribe for the issuance of an exit visa, rising to US$20,000 as the Fall of Saigon drew closer.

On 29 April 1975 he arrived at the U.S. Embassy where he was evacuated later that day.

Quang was accused of being involved in the heroin trade, however, these allegations are disputed. Following a visit to Canada in 1975 he was barred from returning to the US until 1989 when he was cleared of all drug charges.

He died on 15 July 2011 at the age of 82.

== Honour ==
- Grand Cross of the National Order of Vietnam
- Army Distinguished Service Order, First Class
- Air Force Distinguished Service Order, First Class
- Navy Distinguished Service Order, First Class
- Gallantry Cross
- Hazardous Service Medal
- Leadership Medal
- Staff Service Medal, First Class
- Training Service Medal, First Class
- Civil Actions Medal, First Class
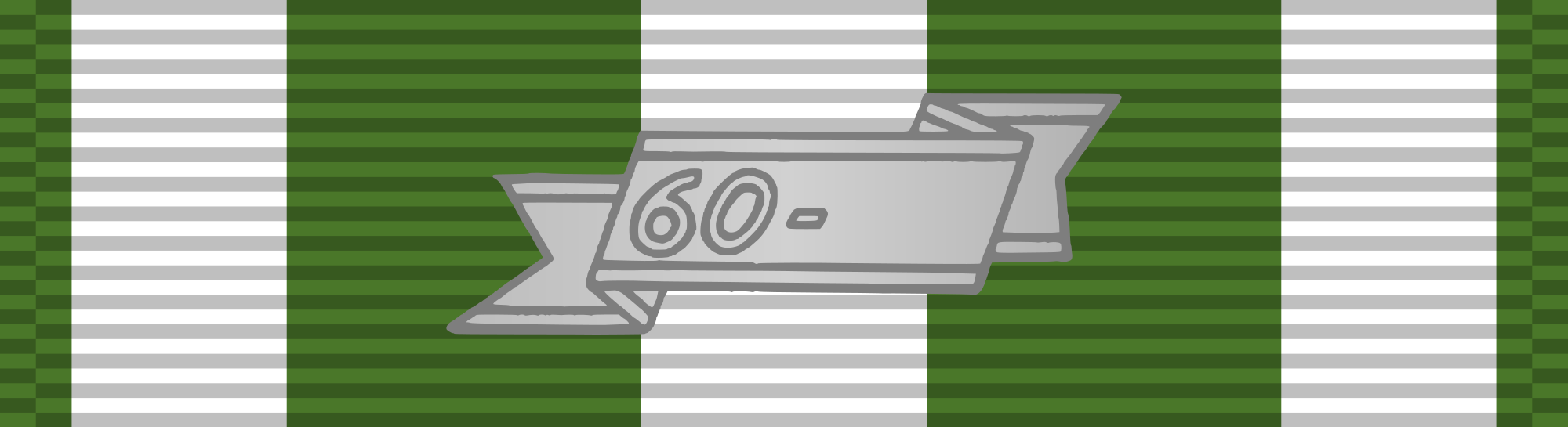
- Vietnam Campaign Medal

== Bibliography ==
- Max Hastings, Vietnam : An Epic Tragedy, 1945 - 1975, Harper Perennial, New York City, October 15, 2019.
- 馬克斯‧黑斯廷斯（原文作者），譚天（譯者），《越南啟示錄1945-1975：美國的夢魘、亞洲的悲劇》（上、下冊不分售），八旗文化，臺北市，2022/04/08。
