= The Long Khot Outpost Area =

Historical heritage site in Long An, Vietnam

Long Khot Outpost Area
- National Heritage Site
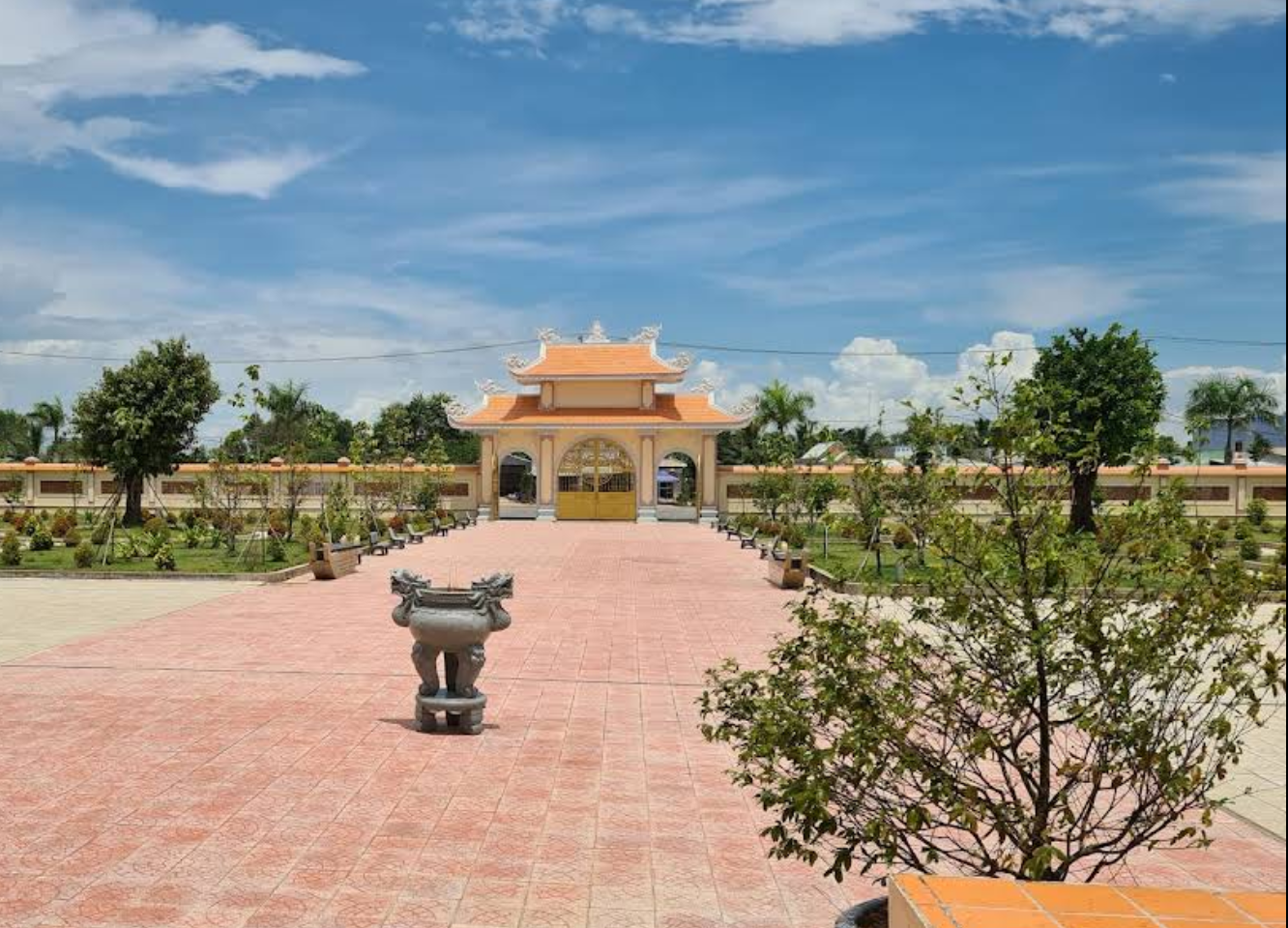
- Other Names: Long Khot Outpost
- Country: Vietnam
- Location: Vĩnh Hưng District, Long An Province
- Coordinates: 11°23′59″N 105°50′22″E

National Heritage Site
- Type: Historical-Cultural Monument
- Date of Designation: May 11, 2019
- Decision: Decision No. 1792/QĐ-BVHTTDL

The Long Khot Outpost Area is a national historical heritage site located in Vĩnh Hưng District, Long An Province. This site marks the historic victory of the Long An Border Guard during 43 days and nights of defending the Southwest border in 1978.

In 1997, the Long Khot Outpost was designated a provincial heritage site by the People's Committee of Long An Province. In 2019, it was recognized as a National Heritage Site by the Ministry of Culture, Sports and Tourism under Decision No. 1792/QĐ-BVHTTDL.
