= Nguyễn Khoa Nam =

South Vietnamese general (1927–1975)

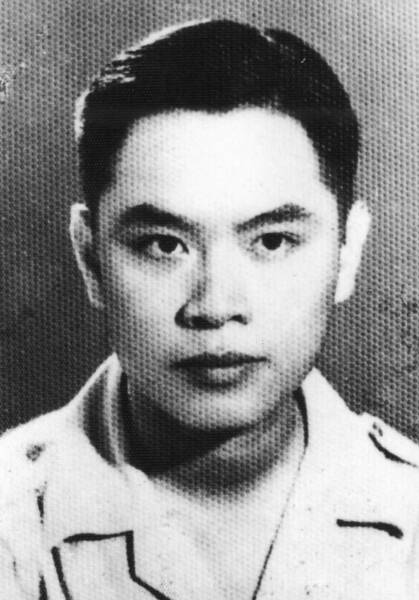
- Born: 23 September 1927; Đà Nẵng, Vietnam, French Indochina
- Died: 30 April 1975 (aged 47) Cần Thơ, Vietnam
- Allegiance: State of Vietnam; South Vietnam
- Branch: Army of the Republic of Vietnam
- Rank: Major General

- Vietnamese name
- Vietnamese: Nguyễn Khoa Nam
- Hán-Nôm: 阮科南

Major General Nguyễn Khoa Nam (23 September 1927 – 30 April 1975) was a native of Đà Nẵng and served in the Army of the Republic of Vietnam (ARVN). He received his primary education at the École des Garçons in Đà Nẵng and graduated in 1939. After joining the French-sponsored Vietnam National Army (VNA), he attended the Thủ Đức Military Academy and graduated in 1953.

== Military service ==
As a sub-lieutenant, his (chuan uy's) first assignment was to an airborne unit. He served in various positions within the VNA during the First Indochina War (1953–1955) and joined the ARVN in 1955. He served as a lieutenant in the airborne, a company commander in the 7th Airborne Battalion, a major in command of 5th Airborne Battalion, as lieutenant colonel (and later colonel) of the 3rd Airborne Brigade.

In January 1970 he was appointed as commander of the 7th Division where he was credited with making remarkable progress and later promoted to Brigadier general. He then served as a major general commanding IV Corps Tactical Zone.

His numerous decorations include the National Order of Vietnam Fourth Class medal and National Order of Vietnam Third Class medal. As a Major General, he liked to carry out operations across the Mekong Delta to prevent the Viet Cong taking over any regional districts.

On 30 April 1975, with the Fall of Saigon, rather than fleeing the country or surrendering, he and his deputy commander, General Lê Văn Hưng shot themselves dead. He was buried at Cần Thơ Military Cemetery the following day.
