= Operation Quyet Chien =

Part of the Vietnam War (1968)

- Part of Vietnam War
Date	3 August – 30 November 1968
Location	Mekong Delta, Ben Tre and Tien Giang Provinces, South Vietnam
Result	American-South Vietnamese operational success

Belligerents
United States; South Vietnam	(Provisional Revolutionary Government of the Republic of South Vietnam) Viet Cong

Commanders and leaders
MG Julian Ewell	

Units involved
(United States) 9th Infantry Division; Mobile Riverine Force (South Vietnam) 7th Division	

Casualties and losses
(United States) 94 killed 10 missing	US body count: 1,571 killed 1,005 suspects detained 289 individual and 101 crew-served weapons recovered

Operation Quyet Chien, was a United States Army and Army of the Republic of Vietnam (ARVN) security operation during the Vietnam War that took place from 3 August to 31 November 1968.

== Background ==
The operation was conducted principally by the U.S. 9th Infantry Division as a continuation of Operation Truong Cong Dinh.

== Operation ==
=== August ===
On 24 August the ARVN 7th Division supported by artillery, helicopter gunships and artillery engaged an enemy force 12 miles (19 km) northwest of Cai Lậy. The ARVN were reinforced by a unit from the 2nd Brigade, 9th Infantry Division. Enemy losses were 83 killed; U.S. losses were eight killed. Two UH-1 Iroquois were shot down 9 miles (14 km) northwest of Cai Lậy. On 30 August a unit of the 2nd Brigade, 9th Infantry Division and the Mobile Riverine Force (MRF) engaged an enemy force 12 miles west of Cai Lậy killing 13 and capturing one and two individual and one crew-served weapon; U.S. losses were three killed.

Operational results to the end of August were 209 PAVN/VC killed and 161 detained and 36 individual and ten crew-served weapons captured. U.S. losses were 20 killed.

=== September ===
On 15 September at 09:30 helicopters of the air cavalry squadron of the 9th Infantry Division operating 9 miles (14 km) southeast of Bến Tre observed two enemy companies and was fired on. Three companies from the Division's 2nd Brigade with the MRF were landed in the area and engaged the enemy killing 25 and capturing two individual weapons; U.S. losses were four killed. On 26 September at 09:00 a company from the 3rd Brigade, 9th Infantry Division engaged an enemy force 7 miles (11 km) northwest of Cai Lậy supported by artillery, helicopter gunships and airstrikes killing 15 PAVN/VC. On 29 September at 16:30 a company from the 2nd Brigade, 9th Infantry Division operating 9 miles east of Bến Tre found a munitions cache containing ten individual weapons, 183 60mm mortar rounds 72 Rocket-propelled grenades (RPGs) and 3000 rounds of 7.62×39mm.

=== October ===
On 1 October helicopter gunships of the 164th Combat Aviation Battalion engaged five targets 10 miles (16 km) northwest of Phú Lộc, An Giang destroying 43 sampans and 30 structures and killing 16 PAVN/VC. On 4 October at 10:45 a company from the 3rd Brigade, 9th Infantry Division was air-assaulted into a hot landing zone 13 miles (21 km) northwest of Cái Bè District. A unit of the ARVN 7th Division established blocking positions to the southeast and artillery, helicopter gunships, AC-47 Spooky gunships and airstrikes provided support. The enemy withdrew at 21:30 leaving two dead; U.S. losses were one killed.

On 5 October between midday and 15:15, helicopters from the cavalry squadron of the 9th Infantry Division observed three groups of PAVN/VC in an area 15 miles (24 km) northwest of Cái Bè. The enemy were engaged by the gunships and 50 were reported killed by the crewmen. At 15:40, a unit of the Division's 3rd Brigade was air-assaulted into the area and made scattered contact with elements of an estimated enemy battalion. Tactical air strikes, artillery and helicopter gunships supported the action which continued sporadically until 18:30 when the remaining enemy withdrew. The infantry found 90 PAVN/VC bodies in the area, 64 of which were determined to have been killed by the helicopter gunships. Eight PAVN/VC surrendered rallied to the unit. Equipment captured included 89 AK-47s, 32 RPG-2 launchers, 28 RPG-7 launchers, 14 light machineguns, two 82mm mortars, two 12.7mm machineguns, two field telephones, three radios and 82,000 rounds of 7.62×39mm.

On 8 October a unit of the 3rd Brigade, 9th Infantry Division supported by helicopter gunships of the 164th Combat Aviation Battalion operating 5 miles (8.0 km) northeast of Cai Lậy killed ten PAVN/VC and captured two and one individual weapon. The infantry also found a munitions cache containing 1,700 grenades. On 13 October at 14:40 a unit of the 2nd Brigade, 9th Infantry Division engaged an enemy force 12 miles (19 km) east of Bến Tre. MRF assault boats established blocking positions on the Mỹ Tho River north of the area and the battle continued until 20:00 when the enemy withdrew leaving 25 dead and five individual weapons. On 14 October at 16:00 a unit of the 2nd Brigade, 9th Infantry Division and air cavalry troops engaged an enemy force 9 miles (14 km) south-southeast of Gò Công. The enemy withdrew at 17:15 leaving 22 dead and 20 captured and five individual weapons. On 17 October at 09:30 United States Navy Patrol Boat, Rivers (PBRs) stopped a barge on the Mỹ Tho River 2 miles (3.2 km) west of Mỹ Tho, on inspection the barge was found to contain a large quantity of medical supplies. Later that day other PBRs found further medical supplies on a boat and detained seven suspected VC.

On 18 October at 13:15 units of the 2nd and 3rd Brigades, 9th Infantry Division and the air cavalry squadron engaged an enemy force 7 miles (11 km) northwest of Cái Bè. The battle continued until 07:00 on 9 October and resulted in 12 PAVN/VC killed and eight individual and one crew-served weapons captured; U.S. losses were five killed. A UH-1 was hit by an RPG 6 miles (9.7 km) west of Cái Bè and crashed. On 19 October at 11:50 air cavalry helicopter gunships engaged an enemy force northwest of Cái Bè. The enemy withdrew at 12:30 leaving 47 dead and one captured. On 21 October at 03:00 20 rounds of 82mm mortar fire hit Đồng Tâm Base Camp causing minimal damage. On 23 October at 10:30 a unit of the 2nd Brigade, 9th Infantry Division was air-assaulted into a landing zone 8 miles (13 km) southeast of Bến Tre where they were immediately engaged by an entrenched enemy force while shot down two UH-1s. Other units reinforced and the battle continued until 19:10 when the enemy withdrew leaving 13 dead and one individual weapon captured; U.S. losses were three killed. On 27 October at 16:20 a unit of the 2nd Brigade, 9th Infantry Division engaged an enemy force 6 miles (9.7 km) northwest of Bến Tre. The enemy withdrew at 17:40 leaving 23 dead; U.S. losses were two killed.

Cumulative operational results to the end of October were 848 PAVN/VC killed and 479 detained and 196 individual and 97 crew-served weapons captured. U.S. losses were 56 killed.

=== November ===
On 8 November between 10:45 and 18:15 units of the 2nd Brigade, 9th Infantry Division supported by artillery and helicopter gunships engaged enemy forces in four separate actions 6 miles (9.7 km) southeast of Bến Tre killing 51. On 14 November at 20:40 a unit of the 3rd Brigade, 9th Infantry Division attacked four sampans 12 miles (19 km) northwest of Cai Lậy destroying all four sampans and killing 21 PAVN/VC. On 22 November at 03:15 a unit of the 1st Brigade, 9th Infantry Division in a night defensive position 6 miles west of Mỹ Tho was hit by ten rounds of 60mm mortar fire causing minimal damage. On 23 November at 11:00 helicopter gunships from the 164th Combat Aviation Battalion supported by airstrikes engaged an enemy force 2 miles (3.2 km) north-northwest of Cái Bè. At midday a unit of the 1st brigade, 9th infantry Division was landed in the strikes area and engaged the remnants of the enemy force until they withdrew at 18:30 leaving 58 dead and 15 captured and 11 individual and one crew-served weapons among 55 destroyed bunkers and 30 sampans.

On 24 November at 10:00 helicopter gunships from the 12th Combat Aviation Group engaged an enemy force 7 miles (11 km) west of Cai Lậy killing ten. Three companies from the 1st brigade, 9th Infantry Division were air-assaulted into the strike area and engaged the enemy in contacts that continued until 15:40 leaving 49 dead and ten captured and six individual and one crew-served weapons. At 11:40 a unit of the 2nd Brigade, 9th Infantry Division engaged an enemy unit 10 miles (16 km) southwest of Bến Tre. The enemy withdrew at 12:30 leaving ten dead and two captured. on 25 November at 10:20 a unit of the 2nd Brigade, 9th Infantry Division engaged an enemy force 4 miles (6.4 km) southeast of Bến Tre. The battle continued until the afternoon when the enemy withdrew leaving 19 dead; U.S. losses were one killed.

On 30 November at 07:35 helicopter gunships from the 12th Combat Aviation Group attacked an enemy force 4 miles (6.4 km) northeast of Cái Bè. The enemy withdrew at 07:50 and at 08:30 a unit of the 1st Brigade, 9th Infantry Division was air-assaulted into the area and reestablished contact. The enemy withdrew at 15:30 leaving 70 dead and 20 captured and 14 individual weapons.

== Aftermath ==
The operation terminated on 30 November. The operational results were 1,571 PAVN/VC killed and 1,005 suspects detained and 289 individual and 101 crew-served weapons captured. U.S. losses were 94 killed and ten missing.
