= Nguyễn Văn Minh =

'Minh Đờn'

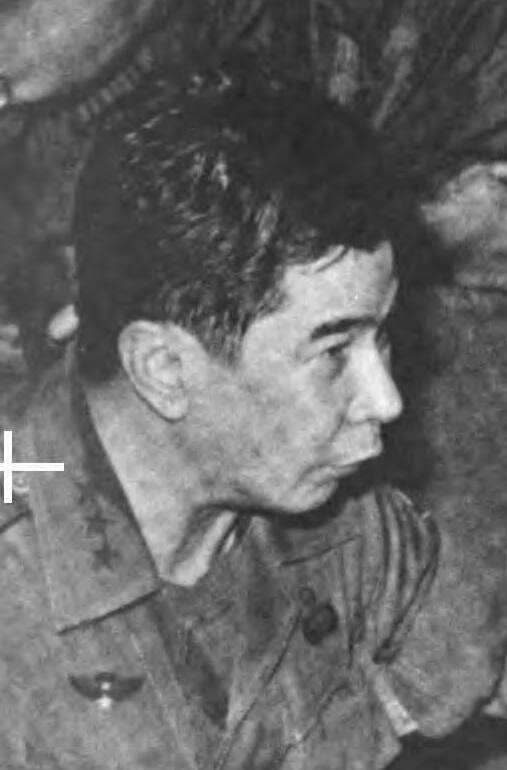
- Nguyễn Văn Minh at An Lộc in 1972
- Born: February 1929; Saigon, French Indochina
- Died: 24 November 2006 (aged 77); California
- Military career
- Allegiance: State of Vietnam; South Vietnam
- Branch: Vietnamese National Army; Army of the Republic of Vietnam
- Service years: 1950 – 25 October 1955 (Vietnamese National Army); 26 October 1955 – 30 April 1975 (Army of the Republic of Vietnam)
- Rank: Lieutenant general
- Nickname: Minh Đờn
- Commands: 21st Division; Capital Military District; III Corps
- Conflicts: Battle of An Lộc; Fall of Saigon

Nguyễn Văn Minh (1929-2006) was a general in the Army of the Republic of Vietnam (ARVN) during the Vietnam War.

== Military career ==
Minh entered military service during the First Indochina War in 1950 as an airborne officer serving in the Vietnamese National Army. Minh was dispatched to An Giang Province, in the Mekong Delta, and served as provincial chief until Diem's death in 1963. He was sometimes known as "Minh đờn" to distinguish him from the much larger (physically) Dương Văn Minh, known as "Big Minh".

In 1964, he became deputy commander of the 21st Division in the IV Corps Tactical Zone. In 1965 Minh was promoted to brigadier general and given command of the division. By 1967 Brigadier general William Desobry, the American senior adviser, considered the 21st Division under Minh the best in the ARVN. However the senior U.S. officer in IV Corps, Major general George S. Eckhardt, had recommended his dismissal, noting that he was "very temperamental and has frequently requested relief when under stress or when at odds with [the] corps commander."

Following the May Offensive of 1968, he was given the command of the Capital Military District by his close friend President Nguyễn Văn Thiệu. His uncle Trần Văn Hương served as Prime minister under Thiệu.

Upon the death of the commander of III Corps, Lieutenant General Đỗ Cao Trí, during the Cambodian Incursion of 1970, Minh was promoted and became Corps commander. American evaluations, however, remained unchanged. Lieutenant general Michael S. Davison described him as "burned out" and "desperate", while Major General Jack J. Wagstaff reported that he was "overworked" and "highly emotional" ("as is well known") and that his decisions were "colored largely by his sensing of the moment".

U.S. advisors found his performance during the North Vietnamese Easter Offensive of 1972 "wanting." Following the offensive Minh remained in command of III Corps despite continued American insistence that he be replaced.

On 27 October 1973 Thiệu transferred Minh back to command of the Capital Military District.

On 3 April 1975 after Minh had served as ARVN inspector general Thiệu once again transferred Minh back to command of the Capital Military District.

== Honours ==
=== National honours ===
- Grand Cross of the National Order of Vietnam

=== Foreign honour ===
- USA :
  - Officer of the Legion of Merit
  - Presidential Unit Citation (Army)
- Thailand :
  - Knight Grand Cross of the Order of the Crown of Thailand
