= Thủ Đức Military Academy =

- Thủ Đức, Saigon, Vietnam
- Emblem of the Thủ Đức Military Academy

Site information
- Type: Military Academy
- Owner: Vietnamese National Army; Army of the Republic of Vietnam Army of the Republic of Vietnam

Location
- Coordinates: 10.847°N 106.794°E

Site history
- Built: 1951
- In use: 1951-1975
- Battles/wars: Vietnam War

Thủ Đức Military Academy was an officer training school of the Army of the Republic of Vietnam (South Vietnam). It was located in the Thủ Đức District of the capital Saigon (now the eponymous subcity in Ho Chi Minh City).

== History ==
=== Infantry School ===
Originally called the Thủ Đức Reserve Officers School, the Infantry School was established at Thủ Đức in October 1951 along with its sister school in Nam Định, in northern Vietnam. Both schools were originally administered by the French Army and all instruction look place in French. In 1952, after the closing of the Nam Dinh Reserve Officers School, the Thủ Đức school became the only reserve officer producing school in Vietnam. In 1954, after the Geneva Accords, the management of the school changed from the French to the Vietnamese National Army (VNA).

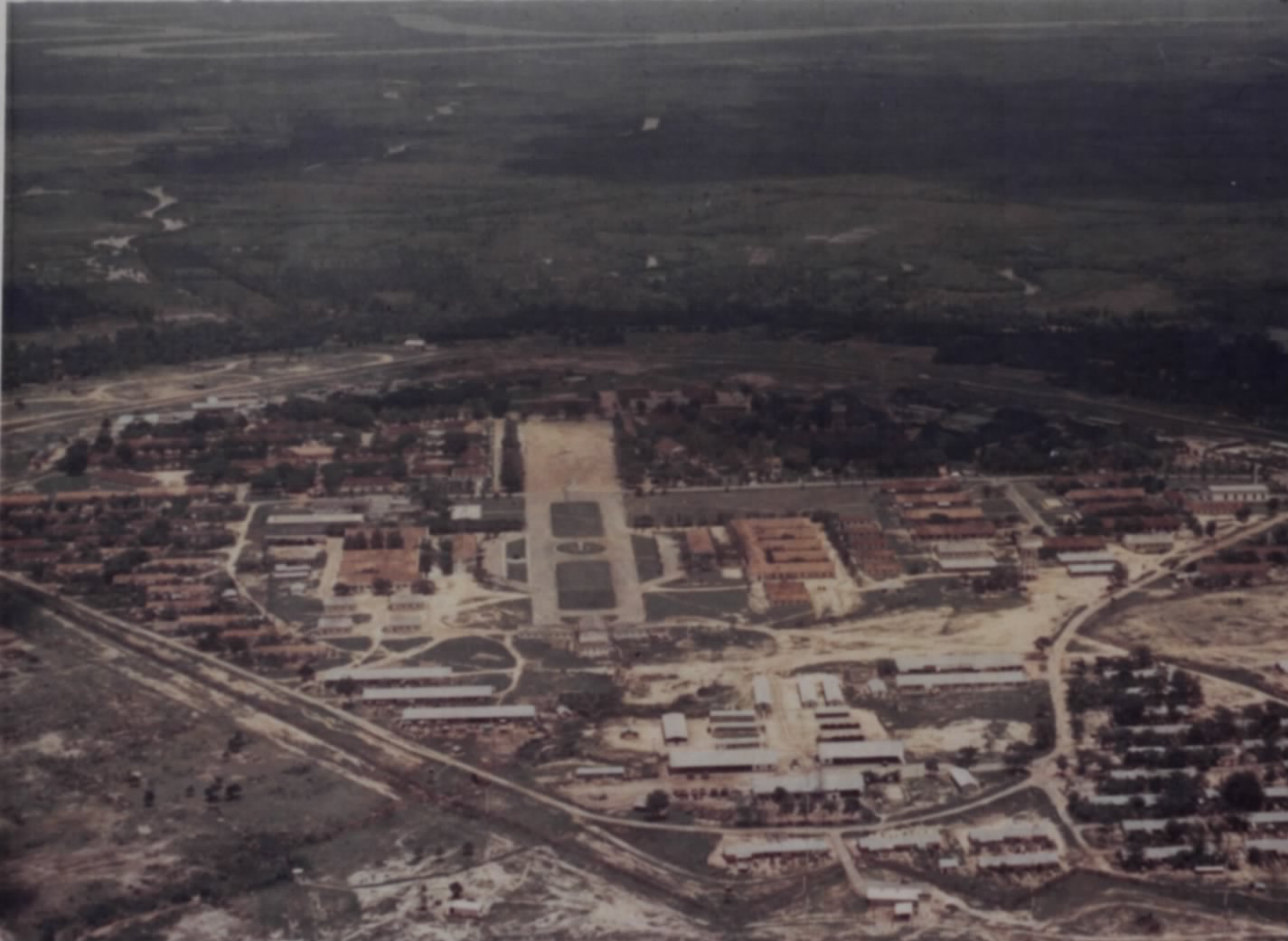
Aerial view of the academy in June 1966

In 1955 the Infantry School was given the job of training cadres and specialists of other branches of the VNA in addition to the infantry. Its name was then changed to the Thủ Đức Military School Center and comprised the Infantry, Armor, Artillery, Engineer, Signal, Ordnance, Transportation and Administrative schools. In October 1961 all of these schools, with the exception of Infantry and Armor, moved from the Thủ Đức area to provide space for the greatly expanded ARVN Reserve Officers Procurement Program.

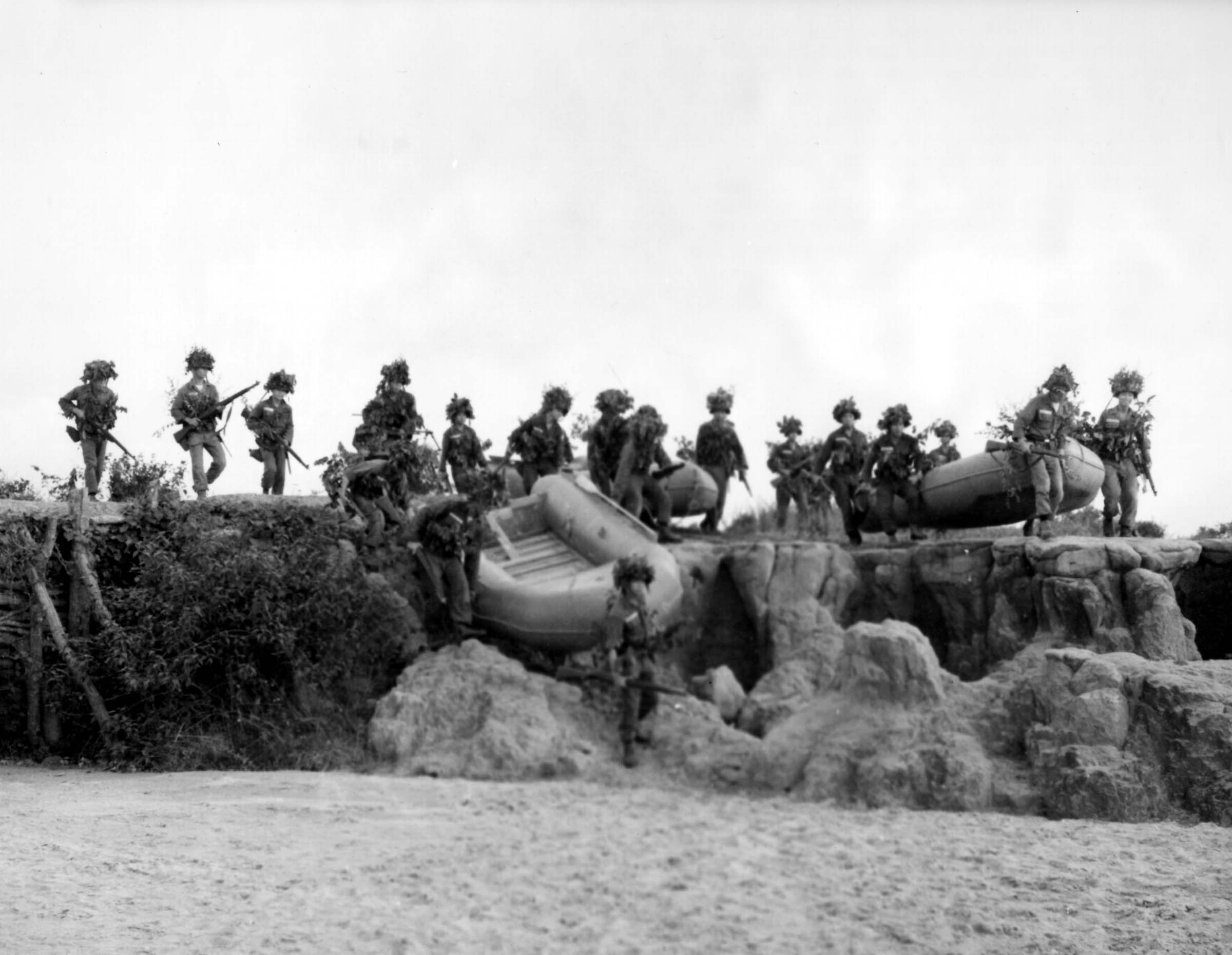
Officer candidates train at Thủ Đức

After several name changes associated with its changing mission, the Thủ Đức Reserve Officers School was officially renamed the Infantry School during July 1964. After that the school expanded until, at the end of 1967, it had a capacity of 3,800 students. Its training program included the officer candidate, company commander, RF officer refresher and methods of instruction courses. The school offered nine months of military instruction to high school-level officer candidates, and graduates received a reserve commission, the rank of aspirant (one level below Second lieutenant), and a four-year active duty obligation. Thủ Đức turned out several thousand officers annually and was the ARVN's primary source of small-unit leaders.

Following the Tet Offensive, all courses were temporarily cancelled except for the two officer candidate cycles. In June 1968 a dramatic change occurred in the school's curriculum and training program. To meet increased officer requirements as a result of the general mobilization, the capacity was increased to approximately 6,000 students. At the same time, the length of the officer candidate program was decreased from 37 to 24 weeks; the first nine weeks consisted of basic and advanced individual training at the Quang Trung National Training Center and the rest of the training was conducted at the school.

Since becoming an officer-producing school in 1952, the Infantry School graduated over 40,900 students as of November 1969 and continued to be the largest source of officers in the South Vietnamese armed forces.

On 18 January 1970 Viet Cong (VC) bombs exploded at the academy killing 18 people and wounding 33.

By 1970 the Infantry School was beginning to realize the benefits of the special construction program to upgrade facilities. Nine classrooms were constructed and furniture was received to accommodate 200 students in each of the nine classrooms. Increased emphasis was placed all instructor training and the methods of instruction course was revised to emphasize practical application as opposed to the lecture system. A signal training area was constructed for more practical application in communications training. Terrain models, mock-ups and bleachers were constructed to improve map reading and weapons training. Work was started on a mock-up VC hamlet, a physical fitness combat proficiency test area and a platoon defensive area. A unit competition program was implemented encompassing academic scores, barracks and unit area inspections, physical training, marching and intramural sports.

=== Armor School ===
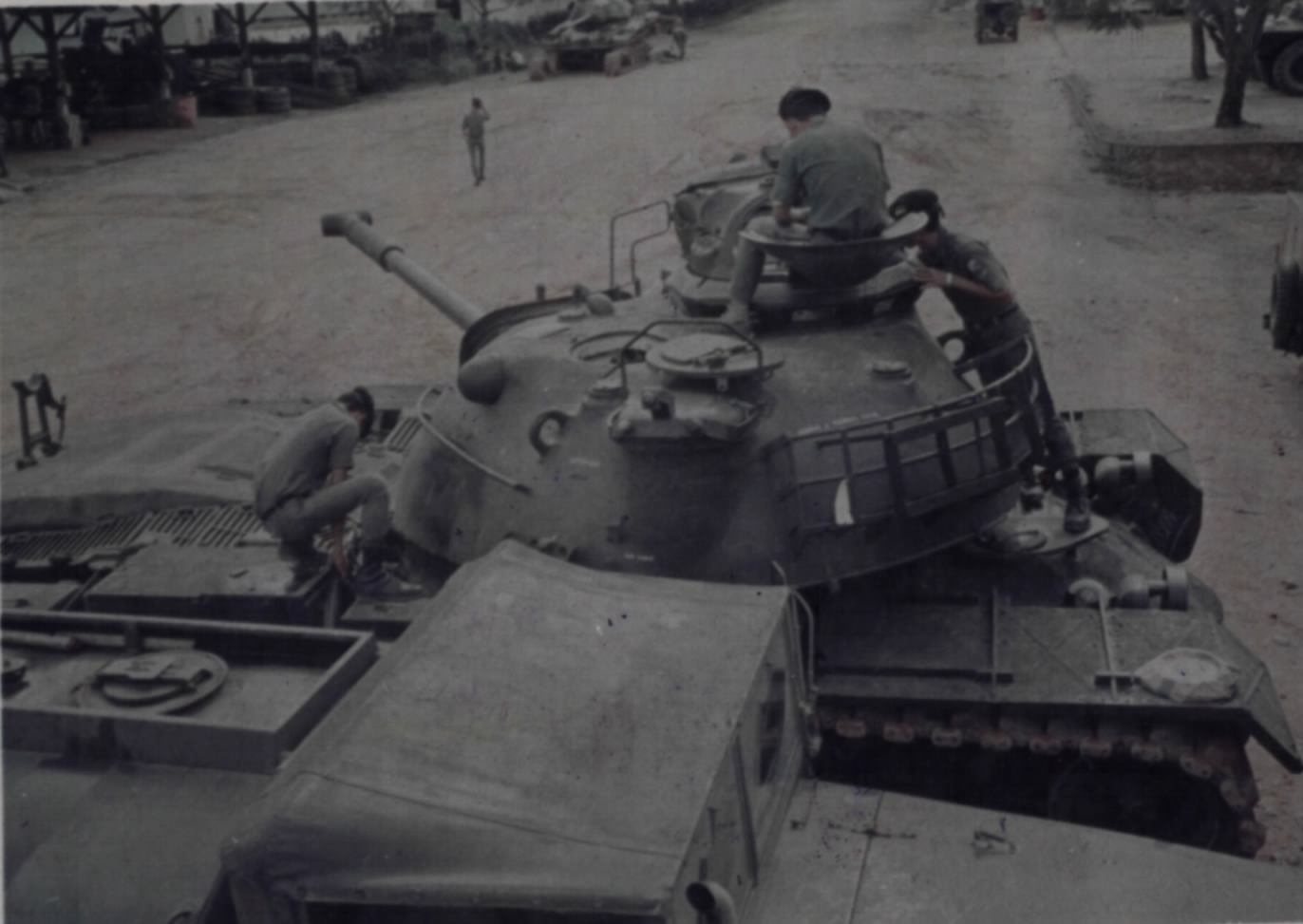
Personnel at Thu Duc prepare M48 tanks

The Armor School was first established by the French Army at the Vietnamese Military Academy in Da Lat in 1950 and was staffed by French officers and Vietnamese enlisted men. In late 1952 the school was dissolved and its function taken over by the Thủ Đức Reserve Officers School. Then in February 1955 when the Thủ Đức Reserve Officers School became the Thủ Đức Military School Center, the armor portion was again established as a separate school. Finally when the other schools of the training center moved to their new locations in October 1961, the Armor School became an independent entity under the Armor Command.

The mission of the school was to train armor personnel in the use and tactics of all armor-type vehicles found in the Republic of Vietnam Military Forces inventory. It also conducted basic and advanced unit training for all newly activated ARVN armor units to ensure that they were combat ready before going into the field as operational forces.

On 13 December 1969, construction of a tank gunnery range was completed at Trảng Bom. The range, approximately 40 km from the school, permitted trainees to fire main batteries without having to travel to tank ranges under U.S. or Australian operational control.

== 1972–1975 ==
In 1972 the Thủ Đức infantry school and armor school began moving to Bearcat Base which had recently been vacated by the United States Army.

On 30 April 1975 as the People's Army of Vietnam (PAVN) 2nd Corps deep penetration unit advanced towards Saigon, soldiers at the school engaged the PAVN armored column on Route 15. Several tanks were detached to deal with the resistance and one was destroyed before the soldiers at the academy surrendered.
