= 25th Division (South Vietnam) =

25th Infantry Division
- Sư đoàn 25
- 25th Division SSI
- Active: 1 July 1961 – 1975
- Country: South Vietnam
- Branch: Army of the Republic of Vietnam
- Part of: III Corps
- Garrison/HQ: Cu Chi
- Engagements: Vietnam War: Operation Concordia; Operation Quyet Thang; Operation Toan Thang I; Cambodian Campaign; Battle of An Loc; Battle of Svay Rieng; Battle of the Iron Triangle

Commanders
- Notable commanders: Lữ Mộng Lan; Phan Trọng Chinh; Nguyen Xuan Thinh; Phan Dinh Thu; Lý Tòng Bá

Insignia
- Division flag

The 25th Division (Vietnamese: Sư đoàn 25) of the Army of the Republic of Vietnam (ARVN)—the army of the nation state of South Vietnam that existed from 1955 to 1975—was part of the III Corps that oversaw the region of the country surrounding the capital, Saigon. It was based at Củ Chi Base Camp to the northwest of the city.

== History ==
The Division was activated in July 1961.

=== 1964 ===
In mid-1964 COMUSMACV General William Westmoreland identified the need for further troops to implement pacification operations in III Corps. Westmoreland suggested transferring one of the divisions in the sparsely populated Central Highlands, either the 22nd or 23rd. Defense Minister Trần Thiện Khiêm offered the Division instead. Khiêm believed local leaders in Quảng Ngãi province could raise enough paramilitary soldiers to counteract the loss of the Division. Westmoreland was skeptical, as were II Corps adviser Colonel Charles Balthis and some Vietnamese officers, who warned that many Division soldiers, a large percentage of whom were from Quảng Ngãi, would desert if transferred away from their home area. As a counter, Westmoreland suggested sending the 1st Division to III Corps, keeping the Division in the critical province of Quảng Ngãi, but transferring control over both it and the province to I Corps. Khiem was adamant, however, and in September, the division began moving to III Corps' Hậu Nghĩa province, leaving behind one of its regiments in Quảng Ngãi. The Joint General Staff (JGS) then assigned one of the independent regiments already stationed in III Corps to the Division to build the organization back up to its full complement. Westmoreland came to rue the decision. As predicted, desertions grew and morale sank because of the move. In Westmoreland's opinion, it took about three years for the Division to regain its efficiency. Equally damaging, efforts to backfill the hole created in Quảng Ngãi by the Division’s transfer floundered, thereby contributing to the serious losses in population control that were already underway in that province.

In August–October the Division participated in Operation Hop Tac, a pacification operation around Saigon.

On 20 August the Division launched Operation Quyet Thang 505 to clear Binh Dinh province's An Lao valley. For 11 days, four battalions and four Regional Forces companies backed by mechanized and artillery units prowled the valley, with the VC largely evading contact. The ARVN killed 55 VC, captured eight prisoners and six firearms for the loss of six dead and 14 wounded.

On 6 October over 800 VC in two battalions and a local force company attacked Luong Hoa, 24km southwest of Saigon at night. The Division responded by sending the 1st Battalion, 46th Infantry, and the 30th Ranger Battalion. They chose to approach the hamlet using the most obvious, and therefore the most likely ambushed, route. The 1/46th walked into an L-shaped ambush and the rangers broke and left the field. The VC attacked the 1/46th four times before starting to withdraw at 11:00 pursued by helicopter gunships and A-1s. ARVN losses were 31 dead, 53 wounded and 15 missing. US losses were five killed in a downed helicopter, and one wounded. The VC left 26 bodies and MACV estimated the allies had inflicted another 100 casualties.

On 4 November the VC launched coordinated attacks in Hau Nghia and Long An provinces. Most of the actions were diversionary to the true targets, which were three platoon bases protecting pacification operations along Highway 4 in Long An. The VC overran these in 30 minutes, but the 3rd Battalion, 50th Infantry, to whom the posts belonged, reacted quickly and drove off the VC. ARVN losses were ten dead and 14 wounded. The ARVN found 31 VC dead.

On 28 December two battalions of the 49th Infantry and three platoons of artillery attacked the VC 506th Battalion. VC losses were 25 killed, three wounded and 20 suspects captured. The ARVN had eight casualties.

=== 1965 ===
In 1965 the Division was under the command of Colonel Phan Trọng Chinh, a friend of both Republic of Vietnam Air Force (RVNAF) commander Nguyễn Cao Kỳ and I Corps commander General Nguyễn Chánh Thi. The Division guarded Highway 4, the major rice supply route to the Mekong Delta, and protected the roads and towns of Tây Ninh, Hậu Nghĩa and Long An Provinces (with a total of fourteen districts). Strong VC forces operated in both Hậu Nghĩa and Long An, close to the capital, but the Division, although reinforced by four Ranger battalions, appeared unable to come to grips with the local VC, or otherwise interfere with their activities. American advisers at MACV and in the field were puzzled and angry, blaming Chinh's lack of aggressiveness. Unbeknownst to the Americans, however, Kỳ had instructed Chinh to orient the bulk of his unit south as an anti-coup force, perhaps as a counter to the neighboring 5th Division commanded by General Phạm Quốc Thuần, a close friend of General Nguyễn Văn Thiệu. Kỳ had given him strict orders not to commit any more than one battalion of each regiment to combat at any one time. Chinh thus had his hands full providing static security for those provinces under his authority and keeping an eye on the political situation in Saigon. Some of his most critical military operations consisted of merely opening the main roads from time to time so that produce could be brought into the capital and supplies and other goods taken out to the towns and military bases within his jurisdiction. Defeating the VC was not his first priority. The Corps senior US adviser had requested Chinh's immediate relief, but Westmoreland chose not to press the matter, hoping that combined operations with American forces "will be able to develop the unit." Several months later he noted that the recent arrival of US combat troops in the area was "already causing some increase in the morale of the Division" but the unit was still "the weakest division in the ARVN," barely "hanging on by its teeth in Hậu Nghĩa Province." Westmoreland was well aware that Chinh's close ties with members of the current ruling junta made his replacement difficult.

On 21 January the Division launched Operation An Dan 70 to hit the VC 506th Battalion in one of its sanctuaries along the Hậu Nghĩa–Long An province border. The 52nd Ranger Battalion engaged VC entrenched along a canal bank and became pinned down. The 2nd Battalion, 49th Infantry was landed by helicopter, but also came under heavy fire and further landings were impossible. The 1st Battalion, 50th Infantry was then transported by boat to link up with the 2/49th. Meanwhile the Rangers attempted to disengage and fell back to form a perimeter along the Vaico Oriental River, followed by the VC who clung so close as to make support by aircraft and artillery difficult. Vessels of the 22nd River Assault Group then arrived to cover the Rangers as they scrambled aboard the boats. VC losses were 73 killed and it was estimated that air and artillery fire had killed 130 more. ARVN losses were 33 dead and 52 wounded.

On 25 June more than 1,000 VC used human wave tactics to assault the ARVN 3rd Battalion, 49th Infantry, based 5km from Đức Hòa district. To retard an allied response, the VC simultaneously bombarded three nearby posts, including the Division headquarters. The 3rd Battalion resisted until eventually forced to retreat. ARVN losses were 44 dead, 40 wounded, and three missing. The VC lost 34 killed and three prisoners, with MACV estimating they had carried off another 108 casualties.

=== 1966 ===
In 1966 US advisers regarded the Division and the 5th Division as the two worst units in the ARVN. Both divisions guarded the approaches to Saigon, but the brunt of the fighting had been assumed by US combat units, the 1st and 25th Infantry Divisions and three separate brigades. Under their protection, the two divisions performed static security missions, but rather than using this respite to regroup and retrain their forces, or to hunt down the local VC, the Vietnamese commanders had let their units degenerate through inactivity, and US advisers now rated them lower than even the neighboring Regional Forces (RF)/Popular Forces (PF). JGS commander General Cao Văn Viên stated that it was "not only the worst ARVN division, but possibly the worst division in any army." In early May Westmoreland ordered the US 1st and 25th Divisions to "start working more closely with elements of these two [South Vietnamese] divisions on operations in order to improve their morale, efficiency and effectiveness." He suggested a "buddy" effort, matching the US 25th and the Division; the US 1st and the ARVN 5th Divisions. In mid-May 1966 US 25th Division commander, Major general Frederick C. Weyand, started a series of combined operations with the Division and RF/PF forces in Hậu Nghĩa province; tasked his subordinate brigade commanders to assist the three infantry regiments of the Division in constructing housing for military dependents; and sponsored a propaganda program entitled "The Brotherhood of the 25th Division," which he dedicated to the "fight for freedom against the communists."

Chinh was regarded by MACV as one of the worst division commanders, however, his continued friendship with Kỳ allowed him to ignore American advice with impunity, and the presence of strong US ground forces within his division tactical area made the performance of his own unit less critical to Saigon. In late 1966 a simmering dispute between Chinh and his senior US adviser Colonel Cecil F. Hunnicutt became public and Chinh went on to lecture his subordinates on the need to avoid being subverted by American wealth and power, as well as on the importance of keeping their self-respect and their loyalty to their own superiors.

=== 1967 ===
From 19 to 21 June the 46th Regiment participated in Operation Concordia with the US Mobile Riverine Force against the VC 5th Nha Be Battalion in Cần Giuộc District of the Mekong Delta.

In 1967 MACV assessed that the three ARVN divisions surrounding Saigon, the 5th, 18th and the Division had shown no improvement, and US advisers considered their commanders, Generals Thuần (5th Division), Đỗ Kế Giai (18th Division) and Chinh, flatly incompetent. The senior Junta generals had repeatedly agreed on the need to replace them, but, for political reasons, had taken no action. When Robert Komer, head of Civil Operations and Revolutionary Development Support (CORDS) tried to enlist the aid of Secretary of Defense Robert McNamara to relieve Chinh, Westmoreland upbraided him for bypassing the US military chain of command. Referring to the affair with Colonel Hunnicutt in 1966, Westmoreland blamed the American press for Chinh's long tenure, asserting that critical news stories about Chinh had made it impossible for Kỳ to act without appearing to be an American puppet. In December 1967, perhaps to appease Westmoreland, JGS Chairman Viên decided to "remove" Chinh by promoting him to the post of III Corps deputy commander. His American advisers had given Chinh some credit for his interest in the civil matters of his Division tactical area and seemed pleased by his new appointment." According to Komer, Chinh was always "a better pacificer than a Division Commander," and the new post would hopefully keep him out of mischief. Thieu was equally pleased to be able to replace Chinh, an old rival, with a supporter, General Nguyen Xuan Thinh. Westmoreland, noting that Thinh had been relieved as commander of the 22nd Division in 1965 because of his poor performance, was not enthusiastic about the choice, but he could only hope that he would do better than his predecessor.

=== 1968 ===
From 11 March to 7 April the Division participated in Operation Quyet Thang to reestablish South Vietnamese control over the areas immediately around Saigon in the aftermath of the Tet Offensive. The US 3rd Squadron, 11th Armored Cavalry Regiment (11th ACR) moved into southeastern Hậu Nghĩa province to support the 49th Regiment and the US 2nd and 3rd Brigades, 25th Infantry Division worked with the Division's 10th Cavalry Squadron and RF units in northern and western Hậu Nghĩa province. The 3rd Brigade, 9th Infantry Division partnered with the 50th Regiment in Long An Province.

On 12 March, Troop M, 3rd Squadron, 11th ACR and a Regional Force company engaged more than 100 VC from the 267th and 269th Battalions in forest 6 km (3.7 mi) north of Đức Hòa in eastern Hậu Nghĩa Province. The Allied force killed 36 VC and captured 10. From 15 to 17 March the 3rd Squadron, 11th ACR and ARVN forces engaged the 272nd Regiment between Đức Hòa and Củ Chi, killing 273 VC before losing contact. On 20 March Troops L and M and an ARVN Battalion regained contact with the 272nd Regiment killing 142 VC that day and 57 more in the same area six days later. Following these losses the 272nd Regiment withdrew into War zone C.

From 8 April to 31 May 1968 the Division participated in Operation Toan Thang I to continue pressure on PAVN/VC forces in III Corps after the successful Operation Quyet Thang. The operation involved nearly every combat unit in III Corps. The operation was a success with allied forces claiming 7,645 VC/PAVN killed, however the operation did not prevent the PAVN/VC from launching their May Offensive attacks against Saigon.

=== 1969 ===
In June 1969 the new II Field Force, Vietnam commander Lieutenant general Julian Ewell initiated the Dong Tien (or "Progress Together") Program with III Corps commander, General Đỗ Cao Trí, to "buddy up US and ARVN units to conduct combined operations [that would]... maximize the effectiveness of both forces [and] achieve in 2, 3, or 4 months a quantum jump in ARVN and RF/PF performance." The US 3rd Brigade, 9th Infantry Division, began operating with elements of the 46th and 50th Regiments, while the US 25th Infantry Division, moved an entire brigade south to the Củ Chi area to work with the 49th and 50th Regiments, which was later supplemented with similar efforts between armor and engineer units of the two divisions. In Hậu Nghĩa, most of the Dong Tien units directed their combat efforts against PAVN/VC units of Sub-Region 1 in the upper Saigon River area. In October 1969 the Dong Tien forces established an integrated fire support base in the "Citadel" region east of Củ Chi, and in February 1970 the Division assumed area responsibility for most of northern Hậu Nghĩa province, including traditional PAVN/VC base areas like the Ho Bo Woods and Boi Loi Woods. During this period most of the combined operations were small-scale affairs routine patrols, night ambushes, and an occasional skirmish with enemy local units that had stayed behind trying to keep the VC political infrastructure alive. As in the other programs, there were no pitched battles with Vietnamese and American units fighting side by side, and thus no hard testing of the Division. In addition, American efforts had focused on the ARVN infantry battalions, largely ignoring the regimental and division elements. Nevertheless, the program was judged a success and, although moving the participating brigade back to the border region early in 1970, encouraged similar efforts with South Vietnamese airborne, territorial and CIDG forces around Tây Ninh city. In many respects the entire program of the American 25th was thus no more than a limited training exercise for a variety of South Vietnamese units.

On 8 September 1969 an ARVN guard shot and killed Lieutenant colonel Eugene F. Smallwood, senior US adviser to the 50th Regiment and Major Anthony J. Broullon, senior US advisor to the 4th Battalion, 50th Regiment at the Regiment's base camp before killing himself.

On 30 April 1970 as part of Operation Toan Thang 42 (Total Victory), an early phase of the Cambodian Campaign, a Division regiment and the 10th Armored Cavalry Squadron together with other ARVN forces crossed into the Parrot's Beak region of Svay Rieng Province.

In late 1970 US advisers described Division commander General Phan Dinh Thu (alias Lam Son), as a "drunkard" and a "playboy."

=== 1972 ===
In January 1972 General Le Van Tu was appointed as Division commander replacing General Nguyen Xuan Thinh.

In mid-July 1972 during the last phases of the Battle of An Lộc, the Division replaced the 21st Division at Tau O (11.514°N 106.614°E) 13 km (8.1 mi) north of Chơn Thành Camp on Route 13 where it had been stopped by the well-entrenched PAVN 209th Regiment, 7th Division. The Division completed the destruction of the remaining PAVN strongpoints by 20 July.

In late 1972 the Division was in its base at Củ Chi, just south of the Saigon River and the Ho Bo Woods. It kept one regiment at Củ Chi, one around Khiem Hanh (11.176°N 106.312°E) north of Cu Chi, and one in Tây Ninh Combat Base west of the province capital. Two battalions of the 50th Regiment were in the Dầu Tiếng area of Bình Dương; one battalion was in Tri Tam, and the other was on the west and opposite, side of the Saigon River. The PAVN 101st Regiment was in the vicinity, probably in the Boi Loi Woods east of Khiem Hanh. The 271st Independent Regiment was probably close to the Vàm Cỏ Đông River south of Go Dau Ha (11.112°N 106.153°E) in Hậu Nghĩa province, posing a threat to Highways 1 and 22, the line of communication between Saigon and Tây Ninh. As December came to a close, the Division and the 5th Division attacked north into the Saigon River corridor. Three battalions of the 5th moved into the Iron Triangle, while on the west side of the river four battalions of the Division entered the Ho Bo Woods. Resistance was weak and casualties light.

=== 1973-4 ===
The ARVN defensive arc was quite close to the capital. In the northwestern sector at Củ Chi the Division was only 25 km (16 mi) from Tan Son Nhut Air Base. Although only one regiment was usually kept in the Củ Chi area, substantial RF/PF forces gave density and depth to the defenses there. Since this was perhaps the most likely approach to Saigon for armor, extensive antitank ditches were dug near strongpoints. The Division kept one regiment at Tây Ninh Combat Base and the other in the Khiem Hanh-Tri Tam-Boi Loi triangle. Although inside contested territory, these dispositions afforded essential depth to the defense. The trouble was that the PAVN/VC often exercised their capability to interdict the tenuously held routes to the outposts, so that major operations were frequently required to run the resupply convoys, and increasingly heavy burdens were placed on aerial resupply. The PAVN/VC crowded the ARVN defenses with local battalions, as well as main force regiments. Contact was virtually constant in the Ho Bo and Boi Loi areas north of Củ Chi, but an even more serious threat developed in the Long Nguyen, a heavily wooded, long-time PAVN/VC base area in the gap between Củ Chi and the 5th Division at Lai Khê. The PAVN 9th Division pushed into this area from its bases in the Michelin and Minh Thanh plantations and was soon threatening lightly held RF/PF positions on the northern leg of the Iron Triangle: Rach Bap, Base 82 and An Dien. The southern vertex of the Triangle opposite the village of Phu Hoa and at the confluence of the Saigon and Thi Thien Rivers, was only 26.5 km (16.5 mi) from the runways of Tan Son Nhut and Bien Hoa Air Bases, and maximum range of the PAVN's 130-mm. field gun was 26.7 km (16.6 mi). A successful crossing of the Thi Thien River below Bến Cát would isolate the 5th Division at Lai Khê, probably result in eliminating the defenses in front of the Bình Dương Province seat at Phú Cường, and place PAVN forces in a position for a rapid move into Saigon.

PAVN strategy in Tây Ninh called for continuing pressure along lines of contact, preventing South Vietnamese forces from probing too deeply into the base area, and undermining the fragile hold on the vital corridor between Tây Ninh City and Saigon. This pressure was exerted from three directions and spilled over prominently into Hậu Nghĩa Province through which the corridor passed into the northwestern suburbs of Saigon. From the Parrot's Beak of Svay Rieng Province PAVN forces probed ARVN outposts along the Vàm Cỏ Đông River. The river port of Go Dau Ha was kept under constant threat. Since the port was the junction of National Routes 1 and 22, only 10 km (6.2 mi) from the Cambodian frontier, its loss would sever Tây Ninh and isolate sizable South Vietnamese forces there. The PAVN prevented any ARVN forays toward its northern Tây Ninh base along local Route 4 which led into the PAVN's growing headquarters, logistical, and political complex around Lò Gò, Thien Ngon, Xa Mát and Katum. Moving within range of the Division's forward base at Tây Ninh Combat Base, the ARVN outpost and communications relay station on Nui Ba Den mountain and the RF base at Soui Da, the PAVN regularly harassed these positions with artillery, mortar, and rocket fire and made resupply of Nui Ba Den hazardous by frequently directing antiaircraft fire and SA-7 missiles at RVNAF helicopters. The PAVN exerted strong pressure against the Tây Ninh-Saigon corridor from its forward combat bases along the Saigon River from the Michelin Plantation to the Ho Bo Woods. In mid-late 1973, the PAVN 101st Regiment was backing up local battalions harassing RF/PF and elements of the Division generally north of Highways 1 and 22. Principal targets for PAVN artillery and mortar attacks were Khiem Hanh, a forward base protecting the northern approach to Go Dau Ha; Trảng Bàng a principal town and defensive position astride Highway 1 midway between Tây Ninh City and Saigon; Củ Chi, the main base of the Division; and the defensive position at Trung Lap north of Highway 1. Although a night rarely passed without some kind of attack against these or smaller posts, major contacts were infrequent. But in one major engagement in late September, the 2nd Battalion, 49th Regiment was caught in a devastating ambush in a rubber plantation between Highway 22 and Khiem Hanh, more than half the battalion were casualties, including 43 killed, and the battalion lost nearly 150 weapons and 18 field radios. Shortly afterward some command changes were made in the Division, including the Division commander and commanders of the 46th and 49th Regiments. The road to recovery was long and slowly travelled for the 49th Regiment, but the 50th Regiment during the last half of 1973, enjoyed more successes than failures in sweep operations around Phú Hòa District and in southeastern Bình Dương and Hậu Nghĩa Provinces. In the only other major contact in the Tây Ninh-Saigon corridor in late 1972, a Hậu Nghĩa RF battalion met a battalion of the PAVN 101st Regiment, reinforced by a local company, northeast of Trảng Bàng, the Hậu Nghĩa battalion collected 32 weapons on the battlefield and buried 56 PAVN soldiers, while RF casualties were 19 killed and 33 wounded.

In March 1974 a battalion from each of the 46th and 50th Infantry Regiments were used to break the PAVN siege of Đức Huệ at the start of the Battle of Svay Rieng. Subsequently, the 49th Regiment and Ranger forces made the initial sweep of PAVN base areas in Svay Rieng Province and then a Division battalion and 3rd Troop, 10th Armored Cavalry Squadron formed part of Task Force 310 for a sweep into the Angel's Wing (11.03°N 106.163°E) area of Cambodia.

On 2 October 1974 the 2nd Battalion, 46th Infantry was committed to reinforce the 2nd Battalion, 9th Infantry, 5th Division which was fighting to recapture Base 82 in the Battle of the Iron Triangle, the combined force recaptured the base on 4 October. In mid-November the 46th Infantry and one battalion of the 50th Infantry joined the battle in its final phases.

In early December 1974 heavy combat in Tây Ninh began, with PAVN rockets falling on the province capital and on adjacent military installations. Although an RF company guarding the radio relay station on the summit of Nui Ba Den began receiving attacks of increasing intensity and frequency, the main PAVN effort was against hamlets and RF outposts along local Route 13 northeast of Tây Ninh City. The PAVN attacked early on 7 December, by noon forces from the 205th Independent Regiment were in the hamlets, although the RF post at Suoi Da held on. The 8th and 9th Battalions, 205th Regiment, were on local Route 13 southwest of Suoi Da, and the PAVN D-14 and D-16 Tây Ninh Battalions were blocking ARVN relief efforts. Meanwhile, the 7th Battalion, 205th Regiment, in trying to overrun Suoi Da, lost over 100 of its soldiers. The RF battalion defending Suoi Da captured two PAVN soldiers to confirm the identification of the 205th Regiment in the attack, and one of the RF patrols ambushed and captured a 100mm field gun. The 46th Regiment, pushing a column up Route 13 from Tây Ninh City, did not fare so well. Ambushed on 12 December about 3 km (1.9 mi) short of Suoi Da, it suffered heavy casualties. While heavy combat was taking place around Nui Ba Den, the 80-man RF company at the top fought off repeated assaults. Helicopter resupply and evacuation had become impossible, and although the company commander reported sufficient food and ammunition, water was running very short and several severely wounded men required evacuation. PAVN assaults on Nui Ba Den continued throughout December 1974, but the RF Company held on. Meanwhile, by mid-month, the relief column eventually reached Suoi Da and found that the besieging PAVN force had withdrawn. RVNAF efforts to resupply the troops on Nui Ba Den were largely unsuccessful. Helicopters were driven off by heavy fires, and fighter-bombers were forced to excessive altitudes by SA-7 and antiaircraft artillery. One F-5A fighter-bomber was shot down by an SA-7 on 14 December. Finally on 6 January 1975, without food and water and with nearly all ammunition expended, the 3rd Company, 314th RF Battalion picked up its wounded and withdrew down the mountain to friendly lines.

=== 1975 ===
On 17 January, III Corps launched an operation using the Division to retake Nui Ba Den. While artillery, helicopter gunships and RVNAF fighter-bombers pounded the PAVN position, Ranger patrols searched for PAVN artillery positions in the jungles north of the mountain. An airmobile assault was attempted, but PAVN antiaircraft artillery and small arms fire were effective in preventing the landing. By 26 January it was apparent that retaking Nui Ba Den was beyond the resources available to III Corps. The 46th Regiment, which had moved to the base of the mountain, was withdrawn to Tây Ninh Combat Base and the operation was terminated. Aided by the excellent observation that Nui Ba Den afforded, PAVN artillery continued to shell Tây Ninh City with heavy rockets and 130 mm guns until the end of the month when the center was virtually deserted.

A lull settled over Tây Ninh Province as the soldiers and civilians of South Vietnam prepared for Tết, which began on 11 February, but although combat declined, the PAVN was very actively preparing for a major offensive in Tây Ninh and in adjoining Bình Dương and Hậu Nghĩa Provinces. Elements of three PAVN divisions, two separate infantry regiments, and a number of separate battalions, all supported by up to 10 battalions of medium and heavy artillery, moved to positions around Tây Ninh City. The 6th Regiment, 5th Division and at least three local battalions and a separate regiment, were concentrated to the southwest, ready to cut Routes 1 and 22 at Go Dau Ha. The new 3rd Division, fresh from its victory in the Battle of Phước Long, was north of the city, while the veteran 9th Division was around the Michelin Plantation, preparing to assault Tri Tam on the Tay Ninh-Bình Dương boundary. Large convoys of trucks were seen moving supplies and ammunition forward. Faced by a formidable enemy on his western flank as he assumed command in II Corps, General Nguyễn Văn Toàn set about making decisive changes in dispositions and concepts to deal with the threat. To make the Division, which covered an immense front from the Cambodian frontier nearly to the western outskirts of Saigon, more mobile, he gave responsibility for all static posts to Tây Ninh Regional Forces. Eight RF battalions and seven separate RF companies were placed along lines of communication and major approaches to the city, while the three regiments of the Division conducted mobile operations in the forward areas. The 46th Regiment was east and southeast of the city; the 49th Regiment was north of the city, with battalions around Nui Ba Den; while the 50th Regiment was near Khiem Hanh, to the southeast. A company of M41 light tanks and two troops of armored personnel carriers were in reserve near Tây Ninh City, and a reinforced company of the 81st Airborne Rangers conducted deep patrols on Nui Ba Den and into the jungle of War Zone C, north of the mountain. The Division commander, Brigadier general Lý Tòng Bá, like Toàn had a background in armor and was exercising vigorous, personal leadership in the forward areas, urging his troops to patrol more aggressively into the contested area north of the city. In early March the situation was becoming tense in western Bình Dương, at Tri Tam and throughout Tây Ninh Province, but Toan's fresh approach renewed the confidence of the Division and the Tây Ninh RF/PF.

The PAVN offensive began at 03:30 on 11 March when PAVN infantry and tanks overran an RF outpost on Route 239 about 10 km (6.2 mi) west of Tri Tam. At 06:00 an intense artillery and mortar bombardment on Tri Tam was followed by an assault by T-54 tanks and infantry. The Province chief reacted by sending two RF battalions east along Route 239 toward Bến Củi, but they were stopped by heavy fire short of the lost outpost. PAVN tanks were already in the Bến Củi Plantation. Meanwhile, as the day wore on in embattled Tri Tam the RF/PF defenders held on, destroying two T-54s in the town. The main attack was coming from the east, and the ARVN soldiers blew the bridge on Route 239 east of the town. Fighting raged through the night, and as dawn broke on 12 March, the RF/PF still held Tri Tam. However, the 95C and 272nd Regiments, and at least a company of tanks, supported by a regiment of artillery, continued the attack that day and eliminated the last resistance in Tri Tam. Meanwhile, Toàn had dispatched another relief column toward Tri Tam, Task Force 318, composed of tanks and armored personnel carriers from the 3d Armored Brigade, with the 33rd Ranger Battalion attached, was stopped by heavy B-40 and 130 mm gunfire before it could reach Tri Tam. Three officers, including a company commander, were among the heavy casualties in initial fighting near Bến Củi. With Tri Tam in its possession, the PAVN now controlled the Saigon River corridor from its beginning, near Tong Le Chon, to the ARVN outpost at Rach Bap in the Iron Triangle. The ARVN base at Khiem Hanh was now within easy range of PAVN artillery. Khiem Hanh's principal mission was to prevent major PAVN units from closing on Routes 22 or 1 near the critical river port and road junction at Go Dau Ha. Tri Tam was thus the first important objective in a campaign to isolate Tây Ninh Province from Saigon. On the eve of the assault on Tri Tam three main force Tây Ninh PAVN battalions, the D-14, D-16 and D-18, with support from the 101st Regiment and the 75th Artillery Division closed Highway 22 between Go Dau Ha and Tây Ninh City. The 75th Artillery Division had five regiments operating in Tay Ninh for this campaign, and the 377th Antiaircraft Artillery Division had about 15 antiaircraft battalions, some providing direct support for infantry. While the PAVN Tây Ninh battalions blocked Highway 22 north of Go Dau Ha, the 6th and 174th Regiments, 5th Division, attacked out of Cambodia and struck the ARVN base at Ben Cau, northwest of Go Dau Ha between the international boundary and the Vàm Cỏ Đông River. Initial assaults were repulsed, and two PT-76 tanks were destroyed. When two large concentrations of tanks were sighted west of Go Dau Ha on 12 March, RVNAF fighter-bombers destroyed eight and damaged nine, losing three aircraft in the engagement. Ben Cau, however, fell on 14 March as defending RF/PF pulled back toward Go Dau Ha. Ben Cau was only one of eight outposts west of the Vàm Cỏ Đông River that came under heavy attack on 12 March. Most of them held out until the night of 13 March, but nearly all were in PAVN hands by the next day. General Toàn reacted to the crisis developing at Go Dau Ha by reinforcing at Khiem Hanh and along Routes 1 and 22. He deployed the 3rd Armored Brigade, with its three battalions, reinforced by the 64th and 92nd Ranger Battalions and the 48th Regiment, 18th Division, reinforced with armored personnel carriers (from Corps' reserve in Long Binh) to Khiem Hanh and Go Dau Ha. He also pulled the 3rd Battalion, 7th Regiment from the 5th Division at Lai Khê and sent it to reinforce Khiem Hanh. While a battalion of the 48th Regiment attacked west out of Go Dau Ha to clear Route 1 to the Cambodian frontier, the 46th Regiment attacked north along Route 22 to help RF/PF clear the road to Tây Ninh against heavy resistance and intense artillery fire.

The 3rd Battalion, 48th Regiment made contact with a PAVN company west of the Vàm Cỏ Đông River on 17 March, killed 36, and captured a number of weapons. Meanwhile, on Route 26 east of Tây Ninh City, an outpost at Cau Khoi, manned by the 351st RF Battalion, was overrun. The outer defenses of Tây Ninh and Hậu Nghĩa began to crumble rapidly after the fall of Cau Khoi. Following an intense bombardment by 105 mm howitzers and 120 mm mortars, the 367th Sapper Regiment, 5th Division, seized Đức Huệ on 21 March, advancing PAVN held positions to the Vàm Cỏ Đông southwest of the critical village of Trảng Bàng on Route 1. If the PAVN could take Trảng Bàng, Go Dau Ha and all of Tây Ninh would be isolated. North of the airfield at Tây Ninh was the main outpost on local Route 13. The PAVN struck here on 22 March, and the defenders withdrew to an alternate position, Mo Cong II, to the south. The attack continued on the 23rd and Mo Cong II was lost, compressing the perimeter north of Tây Ninh to less than 10 km (6.2 mi) deep. The eastern prong of the PAVN offensive in Tây Ninh was still pressing against the vital position at Khiem Hanh. Just north of Go Dau Ha, Khiem Hanh was an essential strongpoint preventing the PAVN from reaching Route 1 from the north and seizing Go Dau Ha and Trảng Bàng. From Trảng Bàng, Route I provided a high-speed approach through the Division base at Củ Chi and on to Tan Son Nhut and Saigon. On 23 March, ARVN soldiers and tanks made contact with PAVN forces near Truong Mit, northwest of Khiem Hanh. The PAVN had advanced through Cau Khoi on Route 26. A major battle developed on the 24th and casualties were very heavy on both sides. The 3rd Battalion, 7th Regiment, 5th Division, attached to the Division, lost over 400 men killed, wounded, and missing, and the attacking 271st Regiment, 9th Division, left nearly 200 dead. The artillery, tank, and automatic weapons fire was intense; the 271st was supported by a battalion of 37 mm antiaircraft weapons used as field artillery, as well as by the 42nd Artillery Regiment with its 85 mm and 122 mm guns. The decimated 3rd Battalion was withdrawn from combat and sent to the regimental base at Phú Giáo in Bình Dương Province. As a precaution against being flanked by a strong attack down the Saigon River corridor, General Toàn sent the 2nd Battalion, 7th Regiment, to reinforce Rach Bap, the western anchor of the Iron Triangle. Then Toàn asked the Chief of the JGS, General Viên, for an Airborne brigade to use in a counterattack at Truong Mit. Viên refused the request; he could not agree to further dissipating the small general reserve while Toàn still had a few uncommitted units. Therefore, on 25 and 26 March, the 3rd Armored Brigade, together with elements of the Division, attacked the 271st Regiment at Truong Mit and succeeded in reoccupying the position. Losses were again heavy on both sides. Toàn then reinforced the defense by sending the headquarters and two battalions of the 48th Infantry, 18th Division, to Khiem Hanh.

In early April Toàn also returned the battalions of the 7th Regiment fighting on Highway 1 near Go Dau Ha to the 5th Division at Lai Khê. This left the defense of Tây Ninh Province and its lines of communication to the Division, elements of the 3rd Armored Brigade, Rangers and RF/PF. In mid-April while the Battle of Xuan Loc was ongoing, the JGS and III Corps bolstered the inner defenses of Saigon. Ba, commanding the Division, put a forward command post with his 50th Regiment at Go Dau Ha. In Tây Ninh City he had the 49th Regiment and the headquarters and one battalion of the 46th Regiment. The balance of the 46th was on Route 22 between Tây Ninh City and Go Dau Ha.

Toàn ordered the Division's armored squadron and two battalions of the 50th Regiment to support defenses in Hậu Nghĩa province and at Trảng Bàng.

At 07:00 on 28 April the PAVN 316th Division began attacking ARVN positions along Route 1 and Route 22 and at Trảng Bàng and shelling Củ Chi Base Camp. Bá recalled his armor and the 1st Battalion, 50th Regiment from Trảng Bàng to enhance the weak defenses at Củ Chi. However the 1st Battalion commander Major Le Quang Ninh was a communist agent and he gathered his officers together and convinced them to surrender. Trảng Bàng was captured by the PAVN at 03:00 on 29 April.

At 05:00 on 29 April two PAVN regiments from the 320th Division attacked Củ Chi Base Camp. Bá ordered his force to fight in place, but by 11:00 after PAVN tanks broke through the defensive lines, order collapsed and Bá and his officers attempted to flee the base. Bá initially evaded capture but was caught later that day.

== Organisation ==
Component units:

- 46th Infantry Regiment
- 49th Infantry Regiment
- 50th Infantry Regiment
- 250th, 251st, 252nd and 253rd Artillery Battalions
- 10th Armored Cavalry Squadron
- US Advisory Team 99
