= Operation Quyet Thang =

Part of the Vietnam War (1968)

- Part of the Vietnam War
Date	11 March – 7 April 1968
Location	Around Saigon, South Vietnam
Result	South Vietnamese and U.S. operational success

Belligerents
United States; South Vietnam	Viet Cong

Commanders and leaders
LTG Frederick C. Weyand; LTG Lê Nguyên Khang	Unknown

Units involved
2nd and 3rd Brigades, 1st Infantry Division; 3rd Brigade, 9th Infantry Division; 2nd and 3rd Brigades, 25th Infantry Division; 3rd Squadron, 11th Armored Cavalry Regiment; 199th Light Infantry Brigade; Marine Brigade; Airborne Division; 7th and 8th Regiments, 5th Infantry Division; 25th Infantry Division	20 battalions

Casualties and losses
Unknown	US/South Vietnamese body count: 2,658 killed 427 captured

Operation Quyet Thang (transl. "Resolved to win"), was a United States Army and Army of the Republic of Vietnam (ARVN) security operation to reestablish South Vietnamese control over the areas immediately around Saigon in the aftermath of the Tet Offensive. The operation started on 11 March 1968 and ended on 7 April 1968.

== Background ==
While their Tet Offensive attacks on Saigon had been quickly repulsed, in early March, more than 20 Vietcong (VC) battalions remained near Gia Định Province, threatening the city. The 101st Regiment, the Đồng Nai Regiment and elements of the 165th Regiment were in southern Bình Dương Province, north of Saigon. Several battalions were in Thủ Đức District northeast of Saigon. Five or 6 unidentified battalions were in Long An Province southwest of Saigon. The 271st and 272nd Regiments of the 9th Division, the D16, 267th, and 269th Main Force Battalions were in eastern Hậu Nghĩa Province northwest of Saigon. While most of these units had suffered heavy losses in the Tet Offensive, their continued presence applied pressure on Saigon and prevented the reestablishment of South Vietnamese Government control.

COMUSMACV General William Westmoreland instructed II Field Force commander LTG Frederick C. Weyand and ARVN III Corps commander LTG Lê Nguyên Khang to sweep the districts surrounding Saigon. The 1st, 9th and 25th Infantry Divisions supported by the 11th Armored Cavalry Regiment (11th ACR) would provide most of the maneuver battalions, with subordinate units in many cases pairing up with ARVN units. The 199th Light Infantry Brigade, worked with the elite South Vietnamese Marine Brigade and the Airborne Division in Gia Định Province. The 2nd and 3rd Brigades, 1st Infantry Division partnered with the ARVN 7th and 8th Regiments, 5th Infantry Division in Bình Dương Province. The 3rd Brigade, 9th Infantry Division partnered with the ARVN 50th Regiment in Long An Province. The 3rd Squadron, 11th ACR moved into southeastern Hậu Nghĩa Province to support the ARVN 49th Regiment, 25th Infantry Division. The 2nd and 3rd Brigades, 25th Infantry Division worked with a cavalry squadron from the ARVN 25th Infantry Division and territorial units in northern and western Hậu Nghĩa Province.

== Operation ==
The operation commenced on 11 March. On 12 March, Troop M, 3rd Squadron, 11th Armored Cavalry and an ARVN Regional Force company engaged more than 100 VC from the 267th and 269th Battalions in forest 6 km north of Đức Hòa in eastern Hậu Nghĩa Province. The Allied force killed 36 VC and captured 10.

From 15–17 March the 3rd Squadron, 11th ACR and ARVN forces engaged the 272nd Regiment between Đức Hòa and Củ Chi, killing 273 VC before losing contact. On 20 March Troops L and M and an ARVN Battalion regained contact with the 272nd Regiment killing 142 VC that day and 57 more in the same area six days later. Following these losses the 272nd Regiment withdrew into War zone C.

On 24 March the 1st Brigade, 25th Division engaged the 7th Cu Chi Battalion near Trảng Bàng in northern Hậu Nghĩa Province killing 243 VC for the loss of 10 U.S. killed.

In late March, Allied intelligence detected VC troop movements south from War Zone C to camps along the Saigon River. On the morning of 25 March, a VC unit attacked two Regional Forces outposts near Trảng Bàng. The ARVN 43rd Ranger Battalion and a U.S. mechanized force from the 4th Battalion, 25th Infantry Division and the 2nd Battalion, 34th Armor Regiment rushed to the area killing at least 287 VC in the ten-hour battle for the loss of 23 ARVN/U.S. killed.

On 26 March, east of Hóc Môn ARVN Airborne forces found 128 dead VC who had apparently been killed by air and artillery strikes while moving south towards Saigon. On 27 March the 2nd Battalion, 34th Armor, and two companies from the 2nd Battalion, 14th Infantry Regiment, killed some 97 VC 5 km northeast of Trảng Bàng.

On 28 March Weyand moved the 199th Light Infantry Brigade from Biên Hòa Province to Tây Ninh Province to help the 1st Brigade, 25th Infantry Division patrol the area between Tây Ninh and Dầu Tiếng to close the communist infiltration routes from Cambodia into central III Corps. This new operation was named Operation Wilderness.

The first week of April saw a sharp drop in enemy contact in the Quyet Thang operational area. Allied intelligence indicated that the VC had withdrawn to more remote areas. Rocket attacks on Saigon had become less frequent as the VC had been pushed back and ARVN forces were now able to reestablish control of the areas around the capital.

== Aftermath ==
The operation was considered a success and the U.S. claimed 2,658 VC killed. It was followed immediately by Operation Toan Thang I which expanded the security operation across III Corps.

The official PAVN history described the operation and Operation Toan Thang I as "causing a great many difficulties for our units trying to approach their targets" for the May Offensive.
