= Operation Toan Thang I =

Part of the Vietnam War (1968)

- Part of Vietnam War
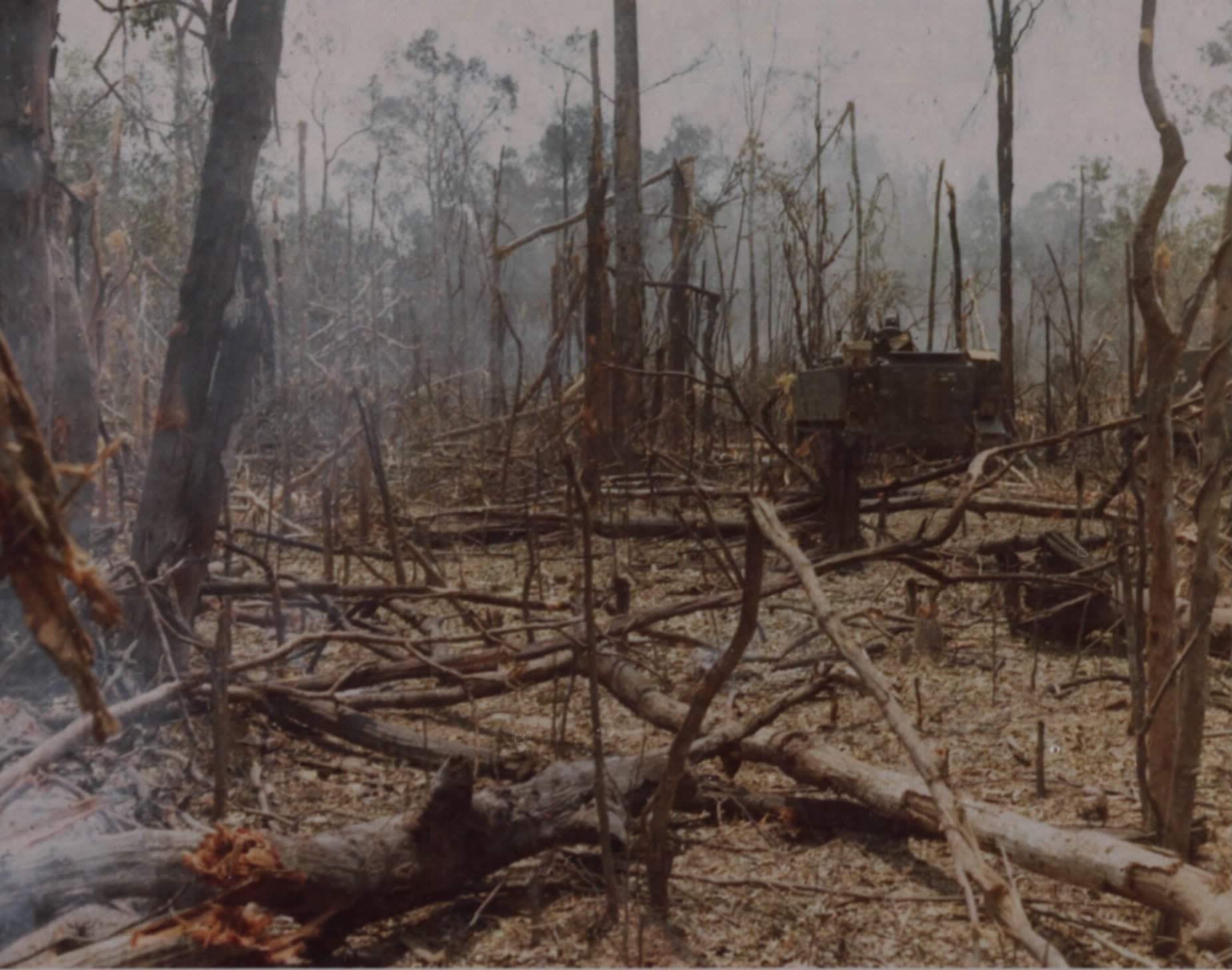
- M113s attack PAVN positions, 18 April 1968
Date	8 April – 31 May 1968
Location	III Corps, South Vietnam
Result	Allies claim operational success

Belligerents
South Vietnam; United States; Australia; New Zealand; Thailand	(Provisional Revolutionary Government of the Republic of South Vietnam) Viet Cong

Commanders and leaders
(South Vietnam) LTG Đỗ Cao Trí (United States) LTG Frederick C. Weyand	

Units involved
(South Vietnam) 1st Taskforce; 5th Ranger Group; 5th Division; 25th Division; 18th Division (United States) 25th Infantry Division; 11th Armored Cavalry Regiment; 199th Light Infantry Brigade (Australia) 1st Australian Task Force (Thailand) Royal Thai Army Expeditionary Division (Thailand) 9th Infantry Division	9th Division

Casualties and losses
(South Vietnam) 762 killed (United States) 564 killed (Australia) (New Zealand) (Thailand) 23 killed	US/Allied claim: 7,645 killed 1,708 captured 3,098 weapons recovered

Operation Toan Thang I ("Complete Victory") was a U.S. Army, Army of the Republic of Vietnam (ARVN), 1st Australian Task Force and Royal Thai Volunteer Regiment operation conducted between 8 April and 31 May 1968 in the Vietnam War. The operation was part of a reaction to the Tet Offensive designed to put pressure on Vietcong (VC) and People's Army of Vietnam (PAVN) forces involving the South Vietnamese III Corps.

== Background ==
Following the successful conclusion of Operation Quyet Thang which reestablished South Vietnamese control in the areas around Saigon, II Field Force commander LTG Frederick C. Weyand expanded the security operations from around Saigon into a counteroffensive involving nearly every combat unit in III Corps to pursue VC/PAVN forces.

== Operation ==
The operation commenced on 8 April. In its first week Allied troops killed 709 VC/PAVN, in the second week 892 VC/PAVN were killed and in the last week of April 792 VC/PAVN were killed. Most of these losses resulted from squad and company-size firefights or helicopter gunship, tactical air strikes or artillery fire missions.

On the early morning of 12 April while the 3rd Brigade, 25th Infantry Division swept VC Base Area 355, a forested area 5 km northwest of the Michelin Rubber Plantation in Binh Duong Province, VC sappers from the 271st Regiment attacked the southwestern part of the night defense position of the 3rd Battalion, 22nd Infantry Regiment. The Americans returned fire as several hundred mortar rounds began to hit the position. At 04:00, a VC battalion came out of the trees and headed for the sector held by Company B. By 04:30, the VC had breached the perimeter and was threatening to push further in. At 05:00 the VC advance was stopped air and artillery strikes and the defenders were able to organize a counterattack. The reconnaissance platoon from the 3/22nd Infantry arrived to help Company B and at 06:15 a group of M113s from the 2/22nd Infantry arrived forcing the VC to break contact and withdrew by 07:00, leaving behind 153 dead. U.S. losses were 16 killed. The 3/22nd Infantry pursued the 271st Regiment and killed another 51 VC for the loss of 7 U.S. killed.

On 18 April Troop A, 1st Squadron, 4th Cavalry Regiment engaged a VC force in a bunker complex 19 km east of Bến Cát. The VC used CS gas against the Americans and eventually disengaged, losing at least 57 killed.

On 25 April, 2 RAR/NZ (ANZAC) and 3 RAR were deployed to the Bien Hoa-Long Khanh border (now Dong Nai Province) to join the operation in anticipation of the attack. The two 1 ATF infantry battalions were supported by their two artillery batteries - one Australian and one New Zealand, a squadron of armoured personnel carriers from 3 Cavalry Regiment (A Squadron), 1 Field Squadron Royal Australian Engineers and 161 Independent Reconnaissance Flight Army Aviation. 3 RAR was replaced by 1 RAR on 3 May. On 5 May, the two 1 ATF battalions were redeployed further north into Bien Hoa Province. Search and destroy patrols saw several contacts with VC but with the attack not happening as expected the ANZAC battalion returned to its TAOR in Phuoc Tuy Province on 10 May to prepare 2 RAR and one of the two RNZIR companies for their departures from Vietnam. However, for the Australians and New Zealanders subsequent actions would lead to the Battle of Coral-Balmoral.

== Aftermath ==
The operation was a success with allied forces claiming 7,645 VC/PAVN killed, but this did not prevent the VC/PAVN from launching their May Offensive attacks against Saigon.

The official PAVN history described the operation as "causing a great many difficulties for our units trying to approach their targets" for the May Offensive and "during their advance toward [Saigon] our units were forced to fight as they marched and their forces suffered attrition."

With improved security in the countryside South Vietnamese Civil Operations and Revolutionary Development Support teams began returning to the villages and hamlets which had been abandoned to the VC with the start of the Tet Offensive. These teams generally found that the rural population was dismayed by the Allies’ failure to protect them in the Tet Offensive and yearning for effective security from the VC, who had been taxing and recruiting them during the preceding two months.

The operation was immediately followed by Operation Toan Thang II in the same area with the same forces.
