= Vietnamese Rangers =

Rangers of the former Army of South Vietnam

- Biệt Động Quân
- Vietnamese Rangers insignia
- Active: 1951–1975
- Country: State of Vietnam; South Vietnam
- Branch: Vietnamese National Army; Army of the Republic of Vietnam
- Type: Light infantry
- Role: Counter-insurgency; Search and destroy Rapid reaction force Special operations Counterterrorism
- Size: 54 battalions (1975): 22 Ranger Battalions; 32 Border Battalions
- Garrison/HQ: Da Nang; Nha Trang; Khánh Hòa; Song Mao; Bình Thuận
- Nickname: Cọp Rằn ("Striped Tigers")
- Motto: Vì dân quyết chiến ("Fight for our people")
- Engagements: Vietnam War

Insignia
- Flag

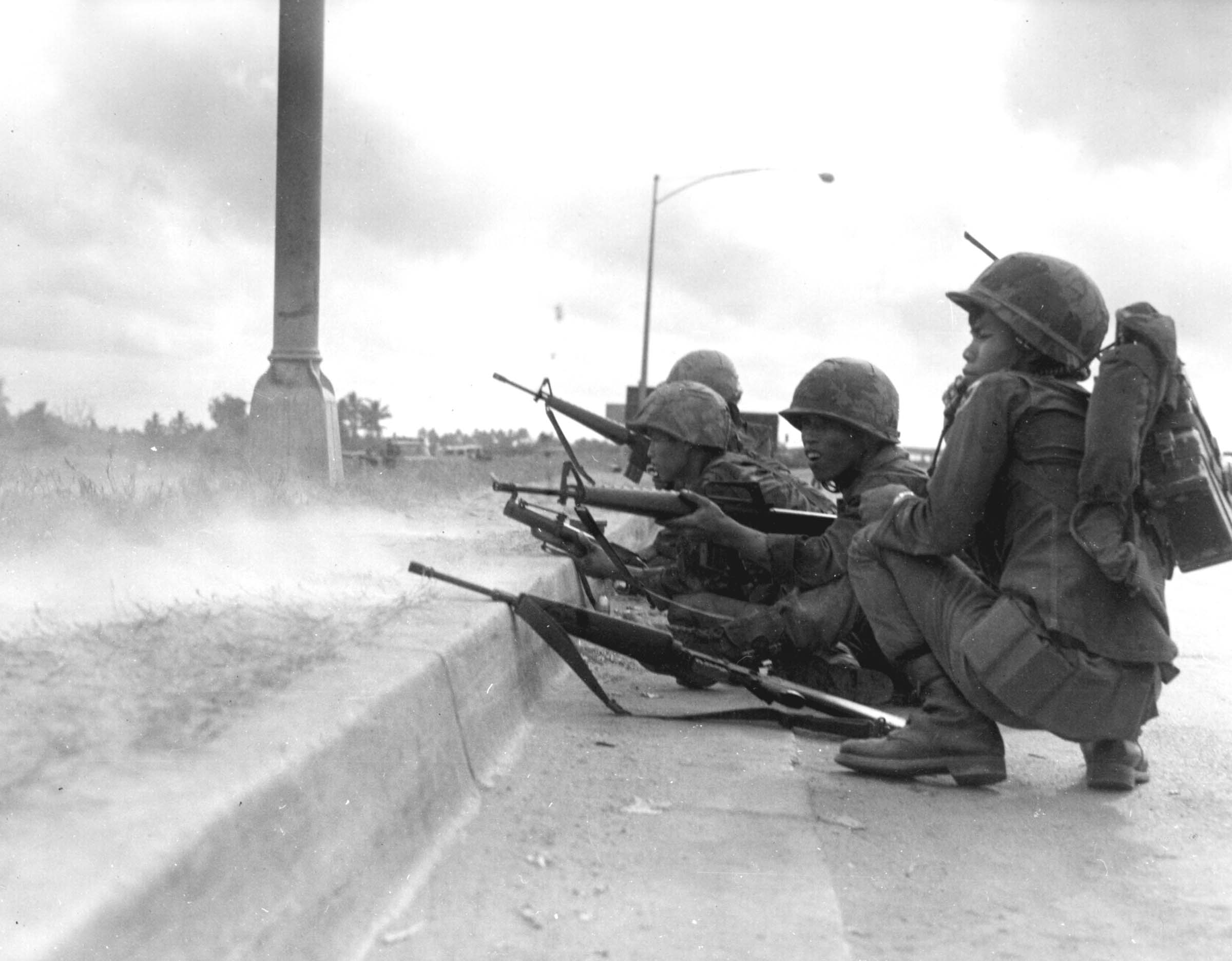
Vietnamese Rangers in action in Saigon during the Tet Offensive in 1968

The Vietnamese Rangers (Vietnamese: Biệt Động Quân), commonly known as the ARVN Rangers or Vietnamese Ranger Corps (VNRC), were the light infantry of the Army of the Republic of Vietnam. Trained and assisted by American Special Forces and Ranger advisers, the Vietnamese Rangers infiltrated beyond enemy lines in search and destroy missions. Initially trained as a counter-insurgency light infantry force by removing the fourth company each of the existing infantry battalions, they later expanded into a force capable of conventional as well as counter-insurgency operations, and were relied on to retake captured regions. Later during Vietnamization the Civilian Irregular Defense Group program was transferred from MACV and integrated as Border Battalions responsible for manning remote outposts in the Central Highlands.

Rangers were often regarded as among the most effective units in the war. Part of this was due to the specialized role of these units, given that they had their origins in French-raised Commando Units, the GCMA which were drawn primarily from the Pro-French colonial Vietnamese National Army and Tai-Kadai groups, operating in interdiction and counter-intelligence roles, and were trained specifically for counter-insurgency and rough-terrain warfare in the region. Ranger Units often had a US Military Adviser attached to them but operated independently. With improvements in the ARVN from 1969 onward and the growing prestige of the Airborne and Marine Division, depredation had caused the Central Highlands-based Rangers to become manned by deserters, released convicts and Montagnards nevertheless the unit continued to operate in the Easter Offensive and frontier skirmishes in 1973 and 1974.

== History ==
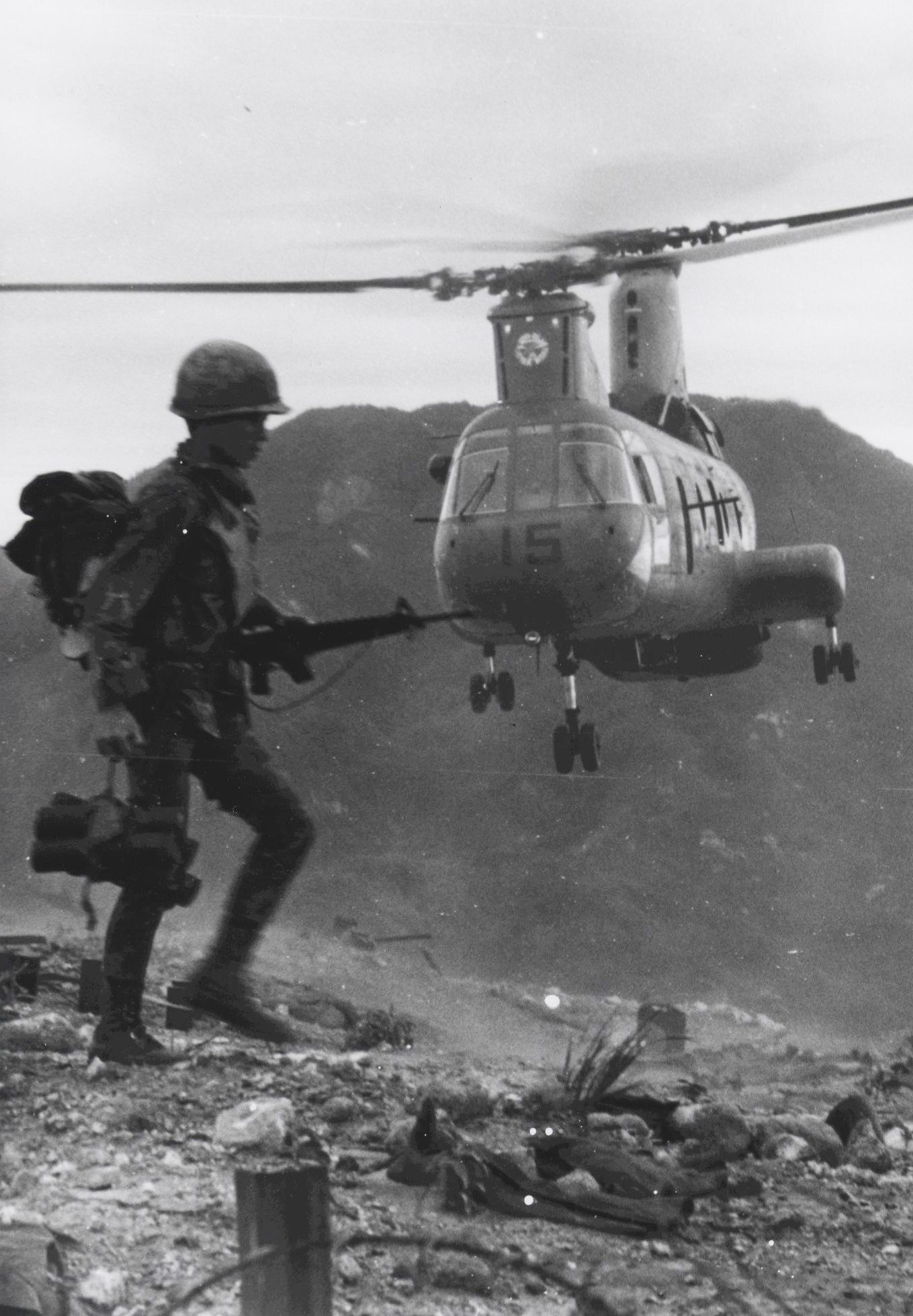
Vietnamese Ranger and an HMM-263 CH-46D near An Hoa, 1969

The French established a commando school in the coastal city of Nha Trang in 1951. After the American Military Assistance Advisory Group took over the military advisory role, the school was converted to a Ranger school in 1956. In 1960, when the Vietnam War began in earnest, the Vietnamese Rangers were formed. Rangers (Biet Dong Quan [BDQ]) initially organized into separate companies with U.S. Army Rangers were assigned as advisers, initially as members of the Mobile Training Teams (MTTs), at Ranger Training Centers (RTC), and later at the unit level as members of the Military Advisory Command Vietnam (MACV). A small number of Vietnamese Ranger officers were selected to attend the U.S. Army Ranger School at Ft. Benning.

In 1962, BDQ companies were initially formed into counter-insurgency Special Battalions but by 1963 Ranger units were organized into battalions and their mission evolved from counter-insurgency to light infantry operations.

=== 1964 ===
On 4 January a VC battalion massed near My Tinh An hamlet near the border with Định Tường province. The VC were soon surrounded by a Ranger company, two Civil Guard companies, and local militia Self-Defense Corps elements. On the morning of the 5th the ARVN 8th Airborne Battalion supported by M113 armored personnel carriers attacked, but became bogged down. The Airborne withdrew and artillery and airstrikes hit the VC, with one airstrike accidentally hitting ARVN forces. By the morning of the 6th the VC had withdrawn leaving only one body, but radio intercepts and local villagers reported that the VC had evacuated about 100 corpses. The next day a shallow grave containing 41 VC dead was found. The ARVN lost ten killed and thirty-six wounded, with an M113 and seven aircraft damaged.

On 14 March an airborne battalion and two ranger companies attempted to envelop two VC battalions near the Cai Cai canal. The operation killed 14 VC and captured 70.

On 22 March the VC 502nd Battalion attacked a small post at My Hoi in Kien Van District. Two battalions of the 10th Infantry, the 19th Civil Guard Battalion, a ranger battalion, a mechanized company, and two additional companies of Civil Guard surrounded the VC. In an attack poorly executed by hesitant ARVN forces, the VC held out and then exfiltrated after dark. ARVN losses were three killed and 11 wounded. Advisers counted 13 VC dead, but the South Vietnamese claimed they had killed 126. The Americans verified that the ARVN captured two machine guns, four automatic rifles, and 14 other firearms.

On 22 April a VC battalion attacked two newly activated Ranger companies conducted a training exercise near Trung Lap killing 12 ARVN and wounding ten and killing one U.S. adviser and wounding three.

On 14 May the VC ambushed a 200-man 37th Ranger Battalion force moving to relieve the strategic hamlet of Bau Ca Tre 20 miles (32 km) north of Saigon, 50 Rangers were killed, 31 wounded and 16 missing and two machine guns and 69 individual weapons were lost. On the same day the VC attacked three outposts, a strategic hamlet, and the district town of Tan Uyen about 35 km north of Saigon in Binh Duong province. The province chief sent 200 Rangers and two U.S. advisers to help. A VC battalion ambushed the force as it crossed an open field. The ARVN lost 53 dead, 45 wounded, and 16 missing.

From 2 to 5 June the allies launched an action along a 32 km stretch of the Vaico Oriental River west of Phuoc Ninh in Tay Ninh Province. Assisted by 20 U.S. advisers and 36 helicopters, 26 of them gunships, 500 Rangers and special forces soldiers conducted a scorched-earth operation. 25 VC were killed and 1,000 civilians were relocated, following which the area was declared a free-fire zone.

On 7 June at 03:30 a VC battalion supported by recoilless rifles and mortars penetrated Duc Hoa, a district town 27 km west of Saigon. A fierce, house-to-house fight ensued between the 600 attackers and 140 Rangers and Civil Guards. The VC broke contact at 06:30, leaving 19 dead. The defenders lost 15 dead and 36 wounded.

On 26 June the ARVN 14th Infantry encircled the VC Cuu Long I Battalion near Ap Long Hoi, 14 km south of the provincial capital of Trà Vinh. After an infantry battalion had taken up a position to the south and two companies of Civil Guard had deployed to the west, the 43rd Ranger Battalion was landed by helicopters north of the target area. The rangers then advanced southward, split on either side of a canal and engaged the entrenched VC. U.S. Army helicopter gunships and RVNAF fighter-bombers continuously hammered the VC, with the VC shooting down one of each. After four hours the VC disengaged leaving 51 dead, one mortar and 34 weapons. ARVN losses were 20 killed and 19 wounded.

On 10 July the ARVN 5th and 7th Divisions launched an operation to clear two VC battalions from the heavily forested border of Hau Nghia and Long An Provinces. The 5th Division thrust southward from Duc Hoa along the Vàm Cỏ Đông River, while the 7th Division drove north from Bến Lức. The object was to trap and destroy the VC between them. Late in the day, the two VC battalions pinned the 30th Ranger Battalion against the banks of the Varic Oriental River. The rangers received air support throughout the night and at 06:30 on 11 July, 24 US Army helicopters delivered an infantry battalion, but the VC already had withdrawn. ARVN losses were nine killed and 27 wounded, US losses were two killed and three wounded. The allies killed 68 VC and captured 73 suspects.

On 13 July the VC ambushed a Ranger convoy on Highway 13 in Bình Long Province 45 miles (72 km) north of Saigon as they moved to support another ranger unit. Sixteen rangers and three U.S. advisers were killed and 19 rangers were missing.

On 22 July the VC attacked An Nhon Tay post in Hậu Nghĩa province. About 3 km northeast of Trung Lap, the VC ambushed the relief force consisting of the 30th Ranger Battalion, two companies from the 44th Rangers, and two troops of M113s. The fight lasted all day, at 20:00, a final assault recovered the damaged M113s, but the allies were not able to capture the VC trenches. The VC disappeared during the night. The ARVN lost 16 dead, 32 wounded, and five missing, along with three light machine guns, two automatic rifles, and 15 individual weapons. The allies captured a recoilless rifle and estimated they had killed up to 80 VC.

On 10 August, after intelligence reported that a VC company was located 15 km west of Mỹ Tho, the ARVN deployed four battalions (one airborne, one infantry, and two ranger) and an M113 troop. All units made contact, and an airstrike helped to kill 42 VC. The VC evacuated an estimated 70 more casualties. ARVN losses were 16 dead and 41 wounded.

On 15 August the VC attacked the adjacent outposts of Hòa Mỹ and Hiệp Hưng in Phụng Hiệp district to lure relief forces into an ambush. The allies anticipated the plan and bombed the ambush site throughout the day. On the night of the 16th, the VC charged a ranger battalion, breaking off when hit by howitzers at Phung Hiep. The VC then resumed their assaults on the two outposts, but both held with the help of air support. The allies found ten bodies after the VC withdrew on 17 July, but the ARVN estimated they had killed nearly 300. ARVN losses were 36 dead and 76 wounded.

On 20 August the VC overran Phu Tuc post in Kiến Hòa Province killing seven, wounding 15, and capturing the rest of the post's 36-man garrison and burning the post. An ARVN reaction force comprising 360 soldiers from the 41st Ranger Battalion and the 3rd Battalion, 12th Infantry arrived too late. As they withdrew, the VC 514th Battalion attacked the column repeatedly for an hour. ARVN losses were 85 killed, 60 wounded, 91 missing and 122 weapons lost. All four American advisers were killed. Westmoreland was dismayed because no local South Vietnamese had informed the ARVN that the VC were setting up the ambush.

On 26 September the 43rd Ranger Battalion chased a VC force into a fortified pagoda 5 km southeast of Cầu Kè, Vinh Binh Province. Two companies were pinned down in flooded paddies and then the remainder of the battalion was also pinned down. Air support was called in and the USAF made ten sorties, losing one A–1E Skyraider. The VC disengaged at midnight. ARVN losses were nine dead and 27 wounded. One US advisor was killed. VC losses were 20 killed and seven weapons captured, with the VC reportedly carrying off 40 more casualties.

On 3 October the ARVN 2nd Battalion, 33rd Infantry launched Operation Dan Chi in An Xuyên province. As the troops riding M113s advanced on the hamlet of Tan Duc they flushed a VC company out into the open. Twelve US helicopters landed 56 rangers to engage an estimated 150 VC. The VC fought the rangers, who were supported US Army gunships, until nightfall when the VC withdrew. The allies found 46 VC dead and took 37 prisoners and captured 24 weapons. The rangers suffered two wounded. The operation continued for another two days, generating little contact.

On 5 October the 23rd Ranger Battalion and other units engaged a VC battalion near Tuy Hoa. ARVN losses were one killed and three wounded. VC losses were 42 killed, three captured and 11 weapons captured.

On 6 October over 800 VC in two battalions and a local force company attacked Luong Hoa, 24 km southwest of Saigon at night. The ARVN responded by sending the 1st Battalion, 46th Infantry, and the 30th Ranger Battalion. They chose to approach the hamlet using the most obvious, and therefore the most likely ambushed, route. The 1/46th walked into an L-shaped ambush and the rangers broke and left the field. The VC attacked the 1/46th four times before starting to withdraw at 11:00 pursued by helicopter gunships and A-1s. ARVN losses were 31 dead, 53 wounded and 15 missing. US losses were five killed in a downed helicopter, and one wounded. The VC left 26 bodies and MACV estimated the allies had inflicted another 100 casualties.

On 12 October two ranger companies engaged a VC company in Tuy Phước district killing ten VC, including the district leader, capturing 40 VC and five weapons.

On 15 October two ranger battalions and the ARVN 21st Division's reconnaissance company were landed by US helicopters along the border of Bac Lieu and Ba Xuyen provinces to encircle a 200-man VC unit. The VC were forced into the open and hit by US Army helicopter gunships. The VC lost 89 killed, 13 captured and 37 weapons recovered. ARVN losses were six dead and 24 wounded.

On 29 October the 31st Rangers and two battalions of the 48th Infantry searched a VC base area in Phuoc Thanh province. When the VC fired on a UH–1B, one of the battalions diverted its course toward the gunfire and uncovered a large supply cache. The following day, the infantry drove a VC battalion into the open, where the armed helicopters, fighter-bombers, and artillery inflicted significant casualties. The allies had killed 54 VC, wounded 63, and captured four. They had also captured 660 tons of rice, 200 mines, 1,000 uniforms, and large quantities of other supplies.

From 8 November to 31 December the 23rd Ranger Battalion, two battalions of the 44th Infantry, and territorial forces combed Phu Yen province. By year's end, they had killed 119 VC and captured 13 VC, 29 suspects, and 15 weapons. ARVN losses were 73 dead, 106 wounded, 43 missing, and 45 weapons lost.

On 30 November rangers carried by USMC helicopters raided a hamlet 7 km northwest of Danang where two VC platoons had taken refuge. The VC lost 49 killed and 31 captured and 16 weapons captured. It was estimated that the VC had evacuated a further 40 casualties.

On 27 December territorial soldiers encountered a battalion from the VC D2 Regiment and two local force companies, 500 troops in all, that were protecting the commander of Military Region 3, General Dong Van Cong. US Army helicopters deployed 80 men from the 42nd Ranger Battalion who were immediately pinned down. After two hours of heavy fighting, the 44th Rangers were landed and they attacked the VC in the flank, driving them from their positions. US Army gunships and RVNAF A-1s then pursued the retreating VC. The ARVN lost 15 dead and 38 wounded. US losses were twelve wounded, with one UH–1B destroyed. C losses were 82 killed and eight captured, with some claiming VC casualties totaled 300. The South Vietnamese captured a machine gun, two 75mm recoilless rifles, two 60mm mortars, five .50-caliber antiaircraft machine guns, and 29 other weapons. According to prisoners and captured documents, the D2 Regiment had lost 50 percent of its strength between the battles of 11 and 27 December, General Cong, however, escaped.

In late December elements of the 29th, 30th, 33rd, 35th and 38th Ranger Battalions took part in the Battle of Binh Gia with the 30th and 33rd Rangers suffering severe losses.

=== 1965 ===
On 23 February the 39th Ranger Battalion and 5th Infantry Regiment troops were landed by US helicopters to raid eight VC-held hamlets on a peninsula 32 km southeast of Danang. Assisted by armor and a Regional Forces company that came overland, the troops converged, killing 93 VC and capturing ten.

On 26 March the 21st Ranger Battalion ran into a heavily fortified force on a hill west of Highway 14, 10 km south of Dak Sut. The PAVN 101st Regiment surrounded the rangers who were unable to be relieved or extracted due to difficult terrain and heavy fire. After two days the rangers were able to escape at night through PAVN lines. ARVN losses were 24 dead, 47 wounded, seven missing, and 18 weapons and one mortar lost. The PAVN lost 82 dead and three weapons. The battle gave MACV confirmation that a major PAVN unit was operating in South Vietnam.

On 1 April two VC battalions attacked the 52nd Ranger Battalion at Đức Hòa district. The VC quickly overran one of the battalion's flanks. After a half hour, the VC assaulted the position's other flank, forcing the rangers to withdraw 500 meters. There, they made a stand with the help of airstrikes. The 35th Ranger Battalion was landed by US Army helicopters, with one UH-1 shot down and 19 damaged. US Army casualties were two dead and seven wounded. Helicopter gunship crews claimed they killed 29 VC and destroyed 17 structures.

On 4 April the 51st Ranger Battalion fought an all-day battle against two VC companies holding An Thanh and Lam Bac hamlets on Highway 19, 20 km northeast of Qui Nhon. VC losses were 42 killed, two captured and 17 weapons. The allies believed they may have killed an additional 64 VC that were evacuated. ARVN losses were ten killed and 13 wounded.

On 4 May a ranger battalion swept part of the Tuy Phước district. VC losses were 47 killed, 43 captured, 16 suspects detained and ten weapons captured. It was estimated that the VC had evacuated as many as 100 more casualties.

From 10 to 12 May in the Battle of Sông Bé the 34th and 36th Rangers drove out a VC force occupying the town.

On 13 May the ARVN 21st Division was operating in Bạc Liêu province, when a US Army observation plane spotted 50 VC about 60 km to the east at Thanh Thoi An hamlet, 18 km southeast of Soc Trang. A US helicopter gunship platoon and a command-and-control helicopter investigating the area received heavy fire from the preferred landing zone. The first unit of the 42nd Ranger Battalion was landed at an alternate landing zone and quickly came under attack. Throughout the afternoon, US helicopters delivered the rest of the 42nd Rangers, two understrength battalions of the 33rd Infantry, the 21st Division's reconnaissance company, and a 4.2-inch mortar platoon. When part of the VC line collapsed, the rangers poured a devastating fire on the fleeing soldiers from close range. The remaining VC held their ground until 22:00, when they finally cracked under assault. A full moon and a clear sky allowed aircraft to harry the VC as they ran through the open paddies. The pursuit continued until 02:00 on the 14th. VC losses were 174 killed, nine captured and a mortar, a recoilless rifle, two machine guns, four automatic rifles, and 56 individual firearms. ARVN losses were 17 killed and 41 wounded. Five Americans were injured, and four gunships suffered damage.

On 27 May the ARVN 21st Division's 33rd Infantry Regiment and the 43rd Ranger Battalion, a reconnaissance company, and an M113 troop encircled a VC battalion in Phong Dinh Province, 21 km northwest of Soc Trang. VC losses were 96 killed, and 26 captured and 29 weapons. ARVN losses were ten dead and 52 wounded. Meanwhile, to the northeast, the ARVN 7th Division massed a ranger and four infantry battalions, two reconnaissance companies, a mechanized troop, and a territorial company against two VC main force and one local force companies. In the fight that followed, the ARVN killed 40 VC and captured 30 suspects, three firearms, and a .50-caliber machine gun. ARVN losses were ten dead and 32 wounded.

On 30 May in the Battle of Ba Gia the 39th Ranger Battalion was part of a task force with ARVN 2nd Battalion, 51st Infantry Regiment, 25th Division, the 3rd Marine Battalion and one squadron of M113s to recapture Ba Gia which had been captured the previous day by the VC. The VC first attacked the 2nd Battalion, 51st Infantry and then ambushed the 3rd Marine Battalion as it attempted to support the 2/51st forcing both units to retreat to Phuoc Loc. On the morning of 31 May the VC renewed their attacks capturing Phuoc Loc and attacking the 39th Rangers inflicting heavy casualties. Total South Vietnamese losses were 392 men killed and missing.

On 3 June a PAVN/VC battalion attacked Chau Hiep hamlet, a community of 1,700 people in western Gia Dinh province. The garrison, which numbered 80 Popular Forces soldiers, 63 rangers, and 36 Combat Youth, resisted the assault with air support. The South Vietnamese lost 15 killed, 53 wounded, and two missing many of whom were civilians.

On the afternoon of 10 June during the Battle of Đồng Xoài, the 52nd Ranger Battalion was landed by helicopter 3 km south of Đồng Xoài. While the lead company was ambushed by VC suffering heavy losses, the unit pushed on into Đồng Xoài reinforcing the defenders in the camp and repelling several night attacks by the VC.

On 4 July, following reports of a reinforced VC battalion 10 km north of Vĩnh Châu, Bac Lieu province, the ARVN 21st Division launched an attack involving three infantry and two ranger battalions and a reconnaissance company. The battle continued until dark, but by the morning of the 5th, the VC were gone. The VC left behind 212 dead, 19 prisoners, 33 individual weapons, and two mortars. ARVN losses were 14 dead and 30 wounded. US losses were one dead and four wounded and one O-1B shot down.

From 20 to 21 October the 22nd and 96th Ranger Battalions assisted in lifting the Siege of Plei Me.

On 8 December the 11th Ranger Battalion participated in Operation Harvest Moon/Lien Ket 18 in the Quế Sơn Valley with the ARVN 1st Battalion, 5th Regiment 2nd Division and the US 3rd Marine Division's Task Force Delta. On the morning of 8 December the ARVN began their advance along Route 534 with the 1st Battalion on the left of the road and the 11th Rangers on the right. At 13:30 the Rangers walked into an ambush by the VC 70th Battalion which was overrun within 15 minutes, losing a third of their men, the remainder withdrew and established a defensive perimeter 1.2 km northwest and called for air support. The 1st Regiment was prevented from reinforcing the Rangers by intensive small arms and mortar fire and Marine airstrikes hit the VC positions. Later that day HMM-161 helicopters flew in the ARVN 6th Regiment, 2nd Division from Tam Kỳ to replace the 11th Rangers. The operation concluded on 20 December, the Marines had lost 45 killed, the ARVN 90 killed and 91 missing and the VC 407 killed and 33 captured.

=== 1966 ===
From 5–7 March 1966 in Operation Utah the 37th Ranger Battalion assisted the 1st and 5th Airborne Battalions and elements of the US 1st Marine Division in fighting the People's Army of Vietnam (PAVN) 21st Regiment northwest of Quảng Ngãi.

From 2–21 June 1966 in Operation Hawthorne the 21st Ranger Battalion participated with the US 101st Airborne Division in relieving the ARVN 42nd Regiment, 22nd Division which was fighting the PAVN 24th Regiment near the village of Toumorong, Kon Tum Province.

During 1966, the battalions were formed into task forces, and five Ranger Group headquarters were created at Corps level to provide command and control for tactical operations. The Ranger Group structure was maintained until 1970 as U.S. force reduction commenced. The Civilian Irregular Defense Group (CIDG) situated along the Laotian and Cambodian borders, formerly under control of 5th U.S. Special Forces Group, was integrated into the Ranger command. Thus, the Rangers assumed an expanded role of border defense. The conversion of CIDG camps to 37 combat battalions with 14,534 men, more than doubled the Ranger force size.

=== 1967 ===
From June to 15 December 1967 in Operation Fairfax the 5th Ranger Group participated with the US 199th Infantry Brigade in joint counterinsurgency/pacification operations in Gia Định Province, near Saigon. Total VC losses were over 1200 killed or captured.

From 26 to 30 May 1967 the 1st Ranger Group conducted Operation Lien Ket 106 with the ARVN 6th Regiment, 2nd Division and in coordination with the US 5th Marine Regiment's Operation Union II in the Quế Sơn Valley against the PAVN 2nd Division.

From 27 to 31 July 1967 the 44th Ranger Battalion participated in Operation Coronado II with the ARVN 3rd Marine Battalion and the US Mobile Riverine Force against VC units in the Mekong Delta.

On 10 September 1967 the 37th Ranger Battalion encountered a PAVN force north of the Operation Swift area in the Quế Sơn Valley. The Rangers lost 13 killed and 9 missing while the PAVN lost 70 killed. On the evening of 13 September the PAVN attacked the 37th Rangers again and additional ARVN units and 1st Battalion, 5th Marines and 3rd Battalion, 5th Marines were airlifted to support them. By dawn the PAVN disengaged leaving 49 dead while the Rangers has lost 15 killed.

=== 1968 ===
On 26 January 1968 the 37th Ranger Battalion was flown into Khe Sanh Combat Base to fight alongside the US 26th Marine Regiment in the Battle of Khe Sanh in a move more for political than tactical reasons. In late February, ground sensors detected the PAVN 66th Regiment, 304th Division preparing to mount an attack on the positions of the 37th Ranger Battalion on the eastern perimeter of the base. On the night of 28 February, the base unleashed artillery and airstrikes on possible PAVN staging areas and routes of advance. At 21:30, the attack came on, but it was stifled by the small arms of the Rangers, who were supported by thousands of artillery rounds and airstrikes. Two further attacks later in the morning were halted before the PAVN finally withdrew. The PAVN, however, were not through with the ARVN troops. Five more attacks against their sector were launched during March.

During the Tet Offensive battle of Cholon and Phu Tho Racetrack from 31 January-11 February 1968 the 30th, 33rd and 38th Ranger Battalions were all involved in the fighting. During the Tet Offensive attacks on Bien Hoa and Long Binh from 31 January to 2 February 1968 the 3rd Ranger Task Force, consisting of the 35th and 36th Ranger Battalions, provided a rapid reaction force supported by 2 155-mm howitzer battalions located on the southeast of Bien Hoa and together with elements of the ARVN 5th Division which had its headquarters there successfully defended the headquarters and other key facilities in the Bien Hoa-Long Binh complex.

In the mopping up operations of the Battle of Hue on 25 February a two Battalion Ranger task force recaptured the Gia Hoi sector (16.476°N 107.589°E) between the east wall of the Huế Citadel and the Perfume River.

From 8 April to 31 May 1968 the 5th Ranger Group participated in Operation Toan Thang I to continue pressure on PAVN/VC forces in III Corps after the successful Operation Quyet Thang. The operation involved nearly every combat unit in III Corps. The operation was a success with allied forces claiming 7645 VC/PAVN killed, however the operation did not prevent the PAVN/VC from launching their May Offensive attacks against Saigon.

On 6 May 1968 during the May Offensive the 30th and 33rd Ranger Battalions joined with US Cavalry forces to attack a hamlet west of Phú Thọ Racetrack in Saigon meeting heavy resistance they withdrew and called in air and artillery strikes, on entering the hamlet the next morning they counted over 200 VC dead. On 7 May the 35th Ranger Battalion, who had established a cordon with the National Police north of Cholon, were ordered to attack VC positions to the north. They were met by heavy fire including B-40 rockets described by their US adviser as "coming in like hail". The Rangers withdrew to allow airstrikes against the VC and assaulted again but were again stopped by heavy fire. On 8 May the 38th Ranger Battalion relieved the 35th Rangers and attempted to restart the advance but made little progress until aided by US Cavalry forces. The assault slowly continued on 9 May finding 45 VC dead. On 10 May the 33rd Rangers swept the area around Phú Thọ Racetrack finding 9 VC dead and various weapons and supplies. On 11 May the 38th Rangers continued advancing to the north supported by airstrikes. The VC began to disengage across Saigon and the attack was largely over. The 3/4 Cavalry withdrew from the area and its area of operations was taken over by the Rangers.

On 31 August during the Phase III Offensive south of Da Nang the 21st and 37th Ranger Battalions trapped a PAVN unit in a bend of the Song Ky Lam River with the 3rd Battalion, 5th Marines on the opposite bank killing 80 PAVN with 1 captured for the loss of 7 ARVN dead and 45 wounded. At 20:00 Company H 2/5th Marines ambushed 30 PAVN as they attempted to cross the Song Ky Lam on boats, killing all on board.

From 7 December 1968 to 8 March 1969 the 1st Ranger Group participated in Operation Taylor Common with the US 1st Marine Division's Task Force Yankee in the An Hoa basin, Quảng Nam Province against the PAVN/VC Base Area 112. ARVN losses were 100 killed and 378 wounded, PAVN/VC losses were 1,398 killed and 29 captured.

=== 1969–1971 ===
From 26 May to 7 November 1969 the 37th Ranger Battalion participated in Operation Pipestone Canyon with the 1st and 2nd Battalions, 51st Regiment and the US 1st Marine Division against PAVN/VC base areas on Go Noi Island southwest of Da Nang.

On 27 April 1970 a Ranger Battalion had advanced into Kandal Province, Cambodia to destroy a PAVN base in the first operation of the Cambodian Campaign On 30 April, as part of Operation Toan Thang 42 (Total Victory) three Ranger battalions and other ARVN forces crossed into the Parrot's Beak region of Svay Rieng Province.

From 5 January to 30 May 1971 the 74th Ranger Battalion and 11th Armored Cavalry Regiment conducted operations in the Snuol District of Cambodia, culminating in the Battle of Snuol from 25 to 30 May 1971 resulting in 37 ARVN killed and 74 missing for 1043 PAVN killed.

From 8 February to 25 March 1971 the 21st and 39th Battalions of the 1st Ranger Group participated in Operation Lam Son 719. The two battalions developed firebases north and south of Route 9 in Laos to serve as tripwires for any PAVN advance into the zone of the ARVN incursion. On 18 February PAVN forces began attacks by fire on bases Ranger North and South. On 19 February the attacks commenced against Ranger North conducted by the 102nd Regiment, 308th Division supported by Soviet-built PT-76 and T-54 tanks. The ARVN held on tenaciously throughout the night. By the afternoon of the 20th, the 39th Ranger Battalion had been reduced from 500 to 323 men and its commander ordered a retreat toward Ranger South, six kilometers away. Only 109 survivors reached Ranger South by nightfall. Although more than 600 PAVN troops were estimated as killed during the action, casualties in the three-day fight totaled 75 percent of the ARVN battalion. PAVN attention then shifted to Ranger South, where 400 ARVN troops, including the 109 survivors of Ranger North, held the outpost for another two days before General Lãm ordered them to fight their way five kilometers southeast to FSB 30.

=== Easter Offensive ===
On the morning of 3 April 1972 Firebase Delta 25 km northwest of Kontum, defended by one company of Airborne and one of Rangers came under attack by the PAVN 52nd Regiment, the assault was repulsed using intensive tactical airstrikes and the PAVN suffered 353 killed. On 21 April the PAVN launched an assault on Firebase Delta by 3 tanks supported by infantry and by the evening had succeeded in overrunning the base.

At the start of the Battle of An Lộc on 13 April 1972, An Lộc was defended by the 3rd Ranger Group; the 5th Division (less one battalion); Task Force 52 (2nd Battalion, 52nd Infantry Regiment and the 1st Battalion, 48th Infantry Regiment), 500 men; as well as Binh Long Provincial Regional Force, Popular Forces and People's Self-Defense Forces (PSDF), about 2,000 men. The initial attack on the town was repulsed by airpower and skillful use of M72 LAW rockets against PAVN tanks. The second assault on 15 April was also repulsed and the defenders were reinforced by the arrival of the 1st Airborne Brigade and 81st Ranger Group. The PAVN bombarded the town and gradually reduced the defensive line, while all the time being battered by US and South Vietnamese airstrikes. On 11 May the PAVN 5th and 9th Divisions launched a massive all-out infantry and armor assault on An Lộc, suffering severe losses to airstrikes but further squeezing the defenders. Another assault on 12 May failed to take the city. The PAVN launched a final attack on 19 May in honor of Ho Chi Minh's birthday. The attack was broken up by U.S. air support and an ambush by the Airborne. After the attacks of 11 and 12 May the PAVN directed its main efforts to cutting off any more relief columns. However, by 9 June this proved ineffective, and the defenders were able to receive the injection of manpower and supplies needed to sweep the surrounding area of PAVN and by 18 June the battle was over.

In May 1972 during the Battle of Kontum after overrunning the ARVN bases at Tân Cảnh, Đắk Tô and the Firebases along Rocket Ridge the PAVN turned their attention to Polei Kleng Camp and Ben Het Camp which blocked the avenues for attack on Kontum. Polei Kleng, defended by the 62nd Border Rangers, had been subjected to artillery fire since 24 April, but from midday on 6 May the volume of fire increased dramatically with over 500 rounds systematically destroying the base bunkers and an infantry assault by the PAVN 64th Regiment penetrated the perimeter. At 19:00 the two U.S. advisers at the base were evacuated by helicopter. The attack was repulsed and the ARVN continued to hold for a further 3 days during which time U.S. airpower, including gunships and 16 B-52 strikes, was concentrated on the attacking PAVN. On the night of 7 May the PAVN attempted another assault but were again repulsed suffering 300 killed. On the morning of 9 May the ARVN abandoned the base in the face of a PAVN tank and infantry assault, only 97 ARVN and their dependents reaching safety in Kontum. On 9 May, elements of the PAVN 203rd Armored Regiment assaulted Ben Het which was defended by the 85th Border Rangers and the 1st Squadron, 19th Armored Cavalry Regiment equipped with M41 tanks. The Rangers destroyed the first three PT-76 tanks with BGM-71 TOW missiles, thereby breaking up the attack. The Rangers spent the rest of the day stabilising the perimeter ultimately destroying 11 tanks and killing over 100 PAVN. In early May the 2nd and 6th Ranger Groups deployed along Route 14 north of Kontum were replaced by the 45th and 46th Regiments, 23rd Division. On 21 May the 2nd and 6th Ranger Groups supported by armored cavalry and engineer elements began an operation to clear Route 14 from Pleiku to Kontum which had been blocked by the PAVN 95B Regiment near Chu Pao Mountain. The attack was slowed by multiple PAVN ambushes and roadblocks and ultimately halted by the defenses at Chu Pao Mountain.

In late November the 3rd, 5th and 6th Ranger Groups replaced the 18th Division at An Lộc.

=== 1974–1975 ===
During the Battle of Tong Le Chon from 25 March 1973 to 12 April 1974 the 92nd Ranger Battalion at Tonle Cham Camp held out against a prolonged PAVN siege before finally being overrun.

The 11th Ranger Group had the responsibility for the defense of Sơn Tịnh District, but it was probably among the least effective units of this kind. With battalions that could muster only 225-300 men for operations, its performance was desultory at best. The Group's 68th Battalion typified the general lack of combat efficiency characteristic of the other two battalions, and for that matter, most of the 12 RF battalions in Quang Ngai. The 68th was driven from its dug-in positions on Hill 252 in the important Cong Hoa Valley approach to Quang Ngai City-in October by an inferior VC unit. After stalling in attempts to retake the hill, it was sent, somewhat as punishment for failure, to an active area south of Chu Lai. There on the night of 17 December, the 95th VC Sapper Company of Bình Sơn District infiltrated the sleeping battalion command post, caused over 50 casualties including the battalion commander and his deputy and carried away an 81-mm. mortar, eight PRC-25 radios, 15 M-16 rifles, five .45-caliber pistols and five binoculars.

From 30 October to 10 December 1973 the 21st Ranger Battalion together with the 23rd Division fought the Battle of Quang Duc, successfully defeating PAVN efforts to expand their logistical network from Cambodia.

From 27 March 1974 the 83rd Ranger battalion held the Đức Huệ camp against attack by the PAVN 5th Division which began the Battle of Svay Rieng. The Rangers successfully defended the camp and the 7th Ranger Group with other ARVN units attacked PAVN base areas in Svay Rieng Province, Cambodia.

From 18 July to 7 August 1974 Ranger units fought the PAVN 304th Division in the Battle of Thượng Đức.

From 18 July to 4 October 1974 the 78th Ranger Battalion and 12th Ranger Group, together with 3rd Division, fought the Battle of Duc Duc.

From 28 August to 10 December 1974 the 15th Ranger Group together with the 3rd and 51st Regiments, 1st Division fought the Battle of Phú Lộc forcing the PAVN back from hills overlooking Highway 1 and from which they could shell Phu Bai Air Base.

== Organization ==
=== Corps Ranger Liaisons ===
There were Ranger liaison platoons of 45 to 52 men assigned to each ARVN Corps/CTZ headquarters. They were supposed to ensure the "proper use" of the Rangers.

=== Rangers ===
At their height in 1975 there were 54 Ranger battalions in 20 Groups. However, only 22 of these battalions, formed in 10 Groups, were actual Rangers while the rest were Border Rangers who were converted over during the Vietnamization from previous ARVN Special Forces, CIDG and MIKE Forces.

The following Ranger (Biêt Dông Quân) formations existed:

- 1st Ranger Group: 21st, 37th, and 39th Ranger Battalions – Da Nang (I Corps/CTZ)
- 2nd Ranger Group: 11th, 22nd, and 23rd Ranger Battalions – Pleiku (II Corps/CTZ)
- 3rd Ranger Group: 31st, 36th, and 52nd Ranger Battalions – Biên Hòa (III Corps/CTZ)
- 4th Ranger Group: 42nd, 43rd, and 44th Ranger Battalions – Chi Long (initially in the 44 Tactical Zone and later the IV Corps)
- 5th Ranger Group: 30th, 33rd, and 38th Ranger Battalions – Biên Hòa (III Corps/CTZ)
- 6th Ranger Group: 34th, 35th, and 51st Ranger Battalions – Biên Hòa (III Corps/CTZ)
- 7th Ranger Group: 32nd and 85th Ranger Battalions – Saigon, attached to Airborne Division
- 8th Ranger Group: 84th and 87th Ranger Battalions – Formed in 1974–75
- 9th Ranger Group: 91st and 92nd Ranger Battalions – Formed in 1974–75
- 81st Airborne Ranger Group: 81st Airborne Ranger Battalion – Biên Hòa

Additionally, during the Vietnamization of the CIDG and MIKE Forces, former CIDG units were namely given Ranger status and organized into groups of mostly 3 battalions each, but they were largely local forces without any special forces capabilities.

- 21st Ranger Group
- 22nd Ranger Group
- 23rd Ranger Group
- 24th Ranger Group
- 25th Ranger Group
- 31st Ranger Group
- 32nd Ranger Group
- 33rd Ranger Group
- 41st Ranger Border Defense Group – Chi Long HQ
- 42nd Ranger Border Defense Group – Chi Long HQ

The 3rd, 5th, and 6th Ranger Groups, all operational in the III Corps area, were grouped into the Third Ranger Command through which the ARVN attempted to form another division, but the lack of enough heavy weapons prevented this from happening.

=== Border Rangers ===
A further 33 Ranger Border Defense Battalions also existed in 1973. These were the former CIDG and LLDB units formed by the Americans and totaled 14,365 men. Border Ranger Battalions were smaller than their Ranger counterparts with 465 men versus the 575 to 650 of regular Rangers.

In existence by March 1975 were also the following new formations in the Central Highlands, made up of mainly the former Ranger Border Defense Battalions, being now consolidated into Ranger Groups of three battalions each:

- 21st Ranger Group
- 22nd Ranger Group
- 23rd Ranger Group
- 24th Ranger Group
- 25th Ranger Group

=== The 81st Airborne Ranger Group ===
The 81st Airborne Ranger Group was a unique unit originally formed as part of the Project DELTA reaction force. Formed on 1 November 1964 as the 91st Airborne Ranger Battalion and consisted of three companies of Montagnards. A fourth company was added in 1965. It was reorganized in 1966 as the 81st Ranger Battalion by the "purging of non-Vietnamese" (transferred to Border Rangers or Regional Forces) to make it more "effective". The 81st consisted of six all-Vietnamese companies. It was officially under Army of the Republic of Vietnam Special Forces (LLDB) command and not that of Ranger Command. It was actually under the direct control of Project DELTA, although two companies were made available to the LLDB.

== Training ==
Ranger courses were established at three training sites in May 1960: Da Nang, Nha Trang, and Song Mao. The original Nha Trang Training course relocated to Dục Mỹ in 1961 and would become the central Ranger-Biêt Dông Quân-Company and Battalion sized unit training was later established at Trung Lap; to ensure a consistently high level of combat readiness, BDQ units regularly rotated through both RTC's. Graduates of the school earned the Ranger badge with its distinctive crossed swords.

Ranger Training Centers conducted realistic training that enabled graduates to accomplish the type of missions assigned to Ranger units. Known as the "steel refinery" of the ARVN, the centers conducted training in both jungle and mountain warfare.

== Uniforms and equipment ==
The Rangers wore all the uniforms that the ARVN wore, however they were known for their tightly tailored OG-107's and duck hunter camouflage uniforms. Many rangers also wore a red bandana.

Rangers wore a snarling black tiger superimposed over a large yellow star painted in front of their helmets. Many wore a painted black and yellow striping pattern on their helmets. The Rangers also wore brown/maroon berets worn pulled to the left in the French-style with a badge containing a winged arrow in a wreath was worn over the right ear. This beret was also worn by American and Australian Army advisers with the unit.

== Commendation ==
A total of 11 U.S. Presidential Unit Citations were issued to the 22 original Ranger Battalions, including one unit that earned three total citations from two different presidents. See List of non-US Presidential Unit Citations in Vietnam.

The foremost counterinsurgency expert Sir Robert Thompson remarked in 1974 that the ARVN as a whole were the third-best trained army in the free-world and second only to the Israelis in counter-insurgency, with the Rangers, ARVN Airborne and Marine Division forming the vanguard.

== See also ==
- 52nd Ranger Battalion (South Vietnam)
