= Battle of Tong Le Chon =

Part of the Vietnam War (1973)

- Part of the Vietnam War
Date	25 March 1973 – 12 April 1974
Location	Tong Le Chon, South Vietnam 11.59°N 106.485°E
Result	North Vietnamese victory

Belligerents
North Vietnam	South Vietnam

Strength
271st Regiment; 201st Independent Regiment; 2 antiaircraft battalions 28th Artillery Battalion	92nd Ranger Battalion

The Battle of Tong Le Chon took place from 25 March 1973 to 12 April 1974 when North Vietnamese forces lay siege to and finally captured the ARVN Vietnamese Rangers' Tong Le Chon camp.

== Background ==
The Tong Le Chon Camp (also known as Tonle Cham camp was located beside the Saigon River on Route 248, 8 km southeast of the Fishhook (Cambodia) and approximately 14 km southwest of An Lộc. A base was first established here in 1967 to monitor People's Army of Vietnam (PAVN) infiltration from base areas in the Fishhook.

Following the end of the Battle of An Lộc, the Army of the Republic of Vietnam (ARVN) 18th Division turned over the defense of the An Lộc area to the III Corps Ranger Command and the 92nd Ranger Battalion was given responsibility for defense of Tong Le Chon.

The ARVN presence at Tong Le Chon forced the PAVN to detour from its preferred logistical corridors from Tây Ninh Province into Bình Long Province and southward along the Saigon River to Bình Dương Province. In March 1973 the PAVN began a siege of the camp.

== Battle ==
The PAVN siege began on 25 March. Soon after that date all resupply had to be parachuted, evacuation became almost impossible, and the bombardment was almost continuous. Helicopters could not land without prohibitive risk, and the PAVN antiaircraft positions around the camp became so dense that even approach by helicopter became almost impossible. In the 16-week period beginning on 25 March, the PAVN conducted almost 300 attacks by fire against the camp, expending over 13,000 mortar, rocket, and artillery rounds. There were also 11 ground attacks and at least 9 attempts by sappers to infiltrate defenses. The PAVN supported the attacks with psychological bombardments, promising over loud-speakers to afford the defenders safe passage out of the camp and appealing to the camp commander to lead his men out.

As of the first week in July, the total strength of the 92nd Ranger Battalion inside the camp and two close-in outposts was 224 officers and men, of whom 34 were out of action because of wounds or illness. Total casualties for the period were 16 killed, 4 seriously wounded, and 192 lightly wounded or sick, including some with beri-beri and malaria. Despite isolation and deteriorating morale, the Rangers held fast and during those 16 weeks counted 86 PAVN soldiers killed and 10 individual weapons captured, including an antiaircraft machine gun, and claimed destruction of one PAVN 105 mm howitzer. During the 16-week period, the Republic of Vietnam Air Force (RVNAF) flew over 3,000 sorties supporting the camp, dropping more than 300 400-pound bundles of food and other supplies, of which 134 were recovered by the defenders while the remainder fell into PAVN hands.

The besieging force consisted at first of a battalion of the 271st Regiment, 9th Division, later replaced by a battalion of the 201st Independent Regiment. Also included in the forces surrounding Tong Le Chon were a battalion each of the 42nd and 271st Antiaircraft Regiments of the 69th Artillery Group and firing batteries of the 28th Artillery Battalion, the latter equipped with 130 mm field guns.

After a brief respite in June 1973 following the call for the signatories to observe the terms of the Paris Peace Accords, the shelling resumed, moderately enough at first, but reached crescendo proportions later in the year as the PAVN added 120 mm and 160 mm mortars and 122 mm and 130 mm howitzers and guns to the batteries ranging on the camp. Antiaircraft artillery, including 37 mm and 57 mm guns from the newly formed 377th Antiaircraft Artillery Division at Lộc Ninh continued to make supply difficult and evacuation next to impossible. The PAVN 200th Battalion, which had been used in local security missions in the Tay Ninh logistical area, was assigned to the infantry element of the siege force. One of its platoon leaders rallied to the South Vietnamese side in September with some interesting comments on the conduct of the operation. He said that in June the PAVN organized a company to collect parachuted supplies that fell outside the Tong Le Chon perimeter, which between April nod June amounted to about 80 percent of all supplies dropped. After June, according to this rallier, RVNAF techniques had improved to the point where only 10 percent of the drops were recoverable by the company. He asserted that an understanding had been reached between Rangers and the PAVN whereby the C-130s dropping supplies would not be fired upon so long as the company would not be opposed as it collected the supplies outside the perimeter. This assertion cannot be corroborated, but it fits the general character of the situation at Tong Le Chon. If there was a tacit withholding of fire against the C-130s at Tong Le Chon, it certainly did not apply to helicopters. Many attempts were made to fly helicopters into Tong Le Chon to evacuate casualties and land replacements. Between late October and the end of January 1974, 20 helicopters attempted landings; but only 6 managed to land and 3 of these were destroyed by fire upon landing. In the last week of December 1973 a CH-47 Chinook was destroyed as it landed, the 13th helicopter hit by enemy fire on a Tong Le Chon mission during December alone. Casualties were 9 killed and 36 wounded. Another crashed and burned in January, and as the anniversary of the 28 January 1973 ceasefire came and went, 12 seriously injured Rangers remained in the camp.

By March 1974, the situation was becoming desperate for the 92nd Rangers. Seriously wounded soldiers could be neither treated nor evacuated. Resupply was by parachute drop only. Morale in the camp was deteriorating under the strain of isolation and constant heavy bombardment. The cost of the continued defense of Tong Le Chon, as a symbol of gallantry, was exceeding its real worth. The human suffering was incalculable, but the expense in aircraft losses, flying hours, ammunition, and other logistical support was great. As the ARVN's scarce resources became even more scarce, it was clearly time to reassess priorities and determine how best to end this intolerable situation. As of 15 March, about 255 officers and men of the 92nd were still alive in Tong Le Chon, and five of these were critically wounded.

On 20 March Lt. Gen. Phạm Quốc Thuần proposed to the Chief of the Joint General Staff, General Cao Văn Viên, that one of three methods be selected to relieve the 92nd Rangers. First, a division-sized operation could be launched from An Lộc to secure a corridor through which the 92md could be withdrawn, replaced, or reinforced. Second, the commander of the PAVN siege forces could be enjoined to permit the orderly and safe withdrawal of the 92nd, surrendering the camp to the PAVN. Third, the 92nd commander could be ordered to plan and execute a withdrawal- by exfiltrating in small groups-bringing out all his men, including the sick and wounded. General Thuần realized at the outset that only the third plan was even remotely feasible, as General Viên and his staff no doubt understood. The ARVN could not punch through from An Lộc to Tong Le Chon when repeated efforts to attack even a few miles north of Lai Khê had failed. A division could not be assembled with the road to An Lộc held by the PAVN and in any case, all ARVN divisions were heavily committed coping with other threats. The second option was equally unrealistic due to the political repercussions and the precedent could portend future such capitulations, some possibly with less than adequate justification. Only the third option had any merit, but the decision had to be referred to President Nguyễn Văn Thiệu.

Meanwhile, the situation at Tong Le Chon was becoming critical. The intensity of the PAVN's artillery and mortar attacks increased greatly in the week of 17–24 March. In the Two-Party Joint Military Commission meetings in Saigon, South Vietnam's representative warned the Provisional Revolutionary Government that if the attacks on Tong Le Chon did not cease, the RVNAF would launch devastating attacks against PAVN bases in Tây Ninh and Bình Long. In fact, the RVNAF did fly 30 or more sorties around Lo Go in Tây Ninh and around Tong Le Chon on 23 March, but the PAVN bombardments continued. PAVN artillery used against Tong Le Chon between 22 and 24 March included 122 mm rockets, 122 mm howitzers, 120 mm mortars and nearly 1,000 rounds from 82 mm and 60 mm mortars. Many of the bunkers and fighting positions were badly damaged. PAVN sappers attempted to break through the defensive wire on the night of 21/2 March but were driven off. On the 21st, the commander of the 92nd Battalion, Lt. Col. Le Van Ngon, sent a message to Colonel Nguyen Thanh Chuan, commander of the 3d Ranger Command at An Lộc. Colonel Ngon calling for more support or the destruction of the camp. He asked for more airstrikes, although it was already apparent that the RVNAF could not materially change the situation. He asked for a ground relief column, but he probably knew as well as did Colonel Chuan that this could not succeed. In emotional desperation, he asked for airstrikes on his own camp as the only feasible alternative to surrender, which he said he and his men would never do. Colonel Chuan relayed this urgent message to General Thuần who replied that he had received no response from the JGS to his earlier proposals for evacuation or relief. By this time, the survivors at Tong Le Chon included 254 Rangers, 4 artillerymen, 7 stranded helicopter crewmen, and 12 field laborers. Of this force, 10 were seriously wounded and 40 slightly wounded. On the nights of the 24, 25 and 26 March, PAVN sappers penetrated three of seven rings of barbed wire before being forced to withdraw.

The unrelenting bombardment and repeated sapper attacks continued through the month and into April. Still, no initiatives or decisions came from the President Thiệu, III Corps or 3rd Ranger Command to ameliorate the suffering or offer hope to the defenders of Tong Le Chon. While nearly 1,000 rounds of mortar and artillery were falling on the base the night of 11 April, Headquarters, III Corps, received a final request from Colonel Ngon: give us authority to abandon the camp. Whether General Thuần conferred with General Viên or President Thiệu is not known, but at 23:30 that night he ordered Colonel Ngon to defend at all costs. Shortly after midnight, the defenders of Tong Le Chon reported that sensitive papers were being burned. Later they requested that RVNAF stop dropping flares over the camp because they were moving out. Radio contact with the Rangers was broken until 09:00 on 12 April, when a radio operator outside the camp responded to a call. By that time the march to An Lộc, some 16 km northeast through the jungle and PAVN lines, had started. The ranks of the wounded had swollen by 14 during the night's action and 35 more were wounded during the withdrawal. All wounded were brought out; those who could not walk were carried. In the firefights during the withdrawal 4 more Rangers were killed, but even these bodies were carried on to An Lộc.

Following an intensive artillery preparation, a ground attack of infantry and tanks was launched against the camp, but the defenses were so heavily mined that the PAVN was unable to get through the defenses until the 13th. The PAVN found that all equipment had been destroyed or removed and all wounded had been carried out. Only two Ranger bodies were found, and only one Ranger was captured. A captured PAVN soldier said that the attacking PAVN infantry had been ordered to block the Rangers' withdrawal but had disobeyed the order for fear of the South Vietnamese air and artillery fire.

== Aftermath ==
The last of the survivors from Tong Le Chon entered the An Lộc perimeter on 15 April. Although the record was clear that Colonel Ngon had disobeyed orders by withdrawing, he was not punished, but the battalion was dissolved and its men sequestered from the press. The official South Vietnamese position was that the camp had been overrun in clear violation of the ceasefire and appropriate protests were made to the International Commission of Control and Supervision and the Two-Party Joint Military Commission. On 13 April, the RVNAF flew 19 sorties against what remained of the camp. With Tong Le Chon obliterated, the PAVN had unrestricted use of its important east-west line of communication between Tây Ninh and Bình Long and controlled the Saigon River corridor from its source to Dầu Tiếng District.
