= Dục Mỹ Camp =

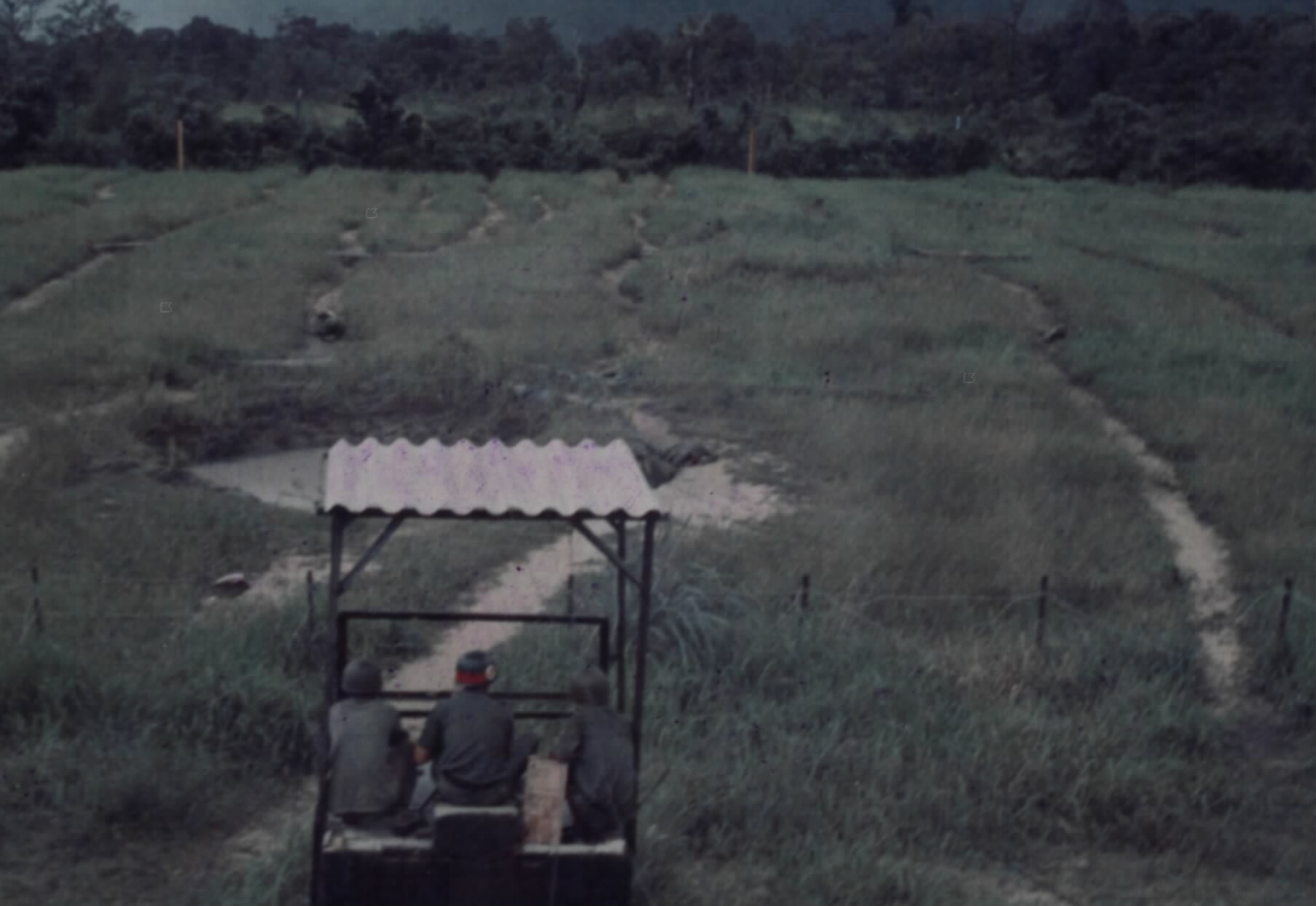
- Infiltration Course at Duc My, 7 November 1971

Site information
- Type: Army Base

Location
- Coordinates: 12.539°N 109.01°E

Site history
- Built: 1961
- In use: 1961–75
- Battles/wars: Vietnam War

Garrison information
- Occupants: Vietnamese Rangers

Dục Mỹ Airfield
- IATA: none; ICAO: none

Summary
- Elevation AMSL: 98 ft (30 m)

Runways
Direction	Length		Surface
Direction	ft	m	Surface
	3,200	975	asphalt

Dục Mỹ Camp is a former Army of the Republic of Vietnam (ARVN) base northwest of Nha Trang in Khánh Hòa Province, south central Vietnam.

== History ==
The base, located approximately 50 km northwest of Nha Trang, was used by the French Army in the 1950s as a training camp for the Groupement de Commandos Mixtes Aéroportés (GCMA). By 1957 it was the cantonment for the ARVN 15th Light Division. In 1961 it became a training center for ARVN rangers and artillery units.

Duc My was home to the ARVN Ranger training centre and artillery school.

The Dục Mỹ airfield was built as an auxiliary training field to the Republic of Vietnam Air Force Air Training Center at Nha Trang Air Base.

== Current use ==
The base has reverted to housing and farmland, the airfield is still visible on satellite images.
