= Lai Khê =

- Commune
- Rural residents planting rice in Lai Khê Commune
- Interactive map of Lai Khê
- Coordinates: 20.980932911541313°N 106.42411105808151°E
- Country: Vietnam
- Region: Red River Delta
- Municipality: Hai Phong
- Established: 16 June 2025

Area
  - Total: 30.07 km^{2} (11.61 sq mi)

Population (2025)
  - Total: 42,875
  - Density: 1,425/km^{2} (3,690/sq mi)
- Website: laikhe.haiphong.gov.vn

Lai Khê is a commune in the municipality of Hai Phong, Vietnam.

On 12 June 2025, the National Assembly of Vietnam adopted Resolution No. 202/2025/QH15 on the reorganization of provincial-level administrative units, effective on the same date. Under the resolution, Hải Dương province was merged into Hai Phong, and Lai Khê Commune became part of the municipality.

On 16 June 2025, the Standing Committee of the National Assembly of Vietnam issued a resolution on the arrangement of commune-level administrative units in Hai Phong in 2025. Under the resolution, the entire area and population of Lai Khê Commune, together with parts of Vũ Dũng, Tuấn Việt, Cộng Hòa, and Thanh An communes, formerly part of Thanh Hà district, and Cẩm Việt Commune, formerly part of Thanh Hà district, were merged to form a new commune named Lai Khê.
