= Tonle Cham Camp =

Installation of the United States Army in Vietnam

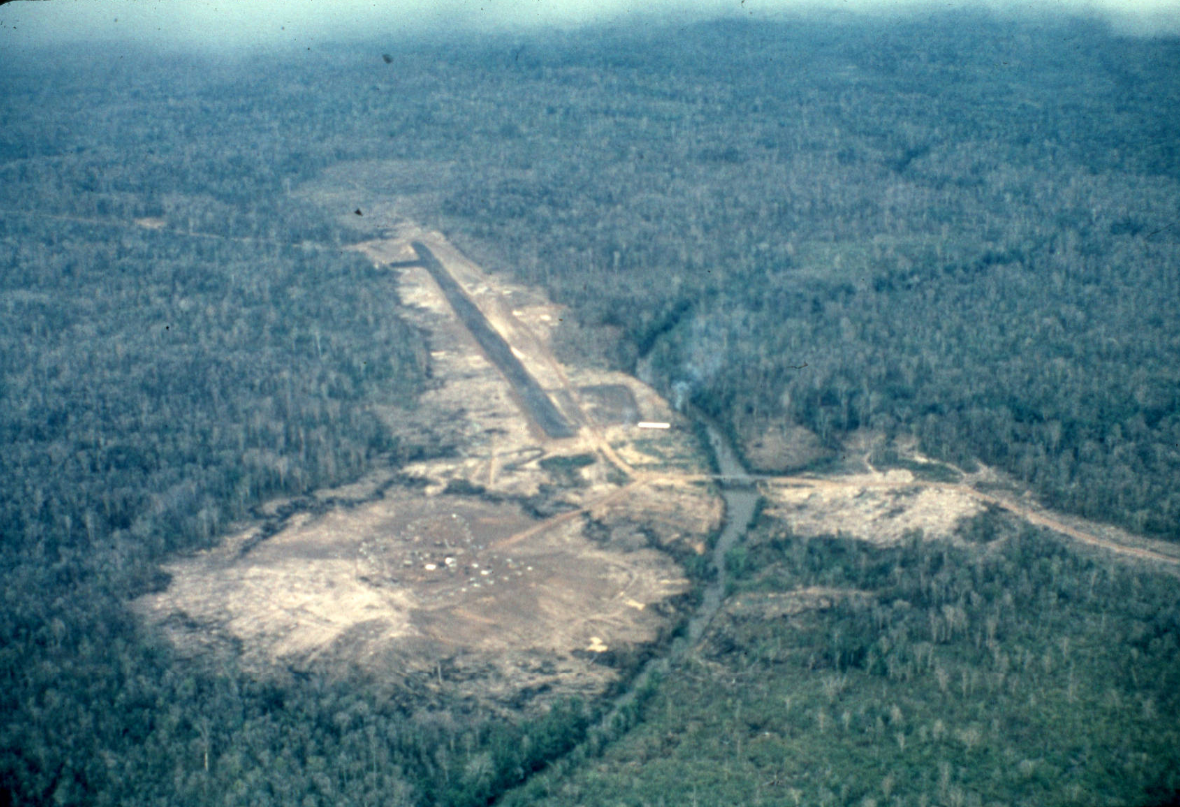
- Tonle Cham Camp, 19 March 1967

Site information
- Type: Army

Location
- Coordinates: 11.59°N 106.485°E

Site history
- Built: 1967
- In use: 1967-74
- Battles/wars: Vietnam War

Garrison information
- Occupants: 5th Special Forces Group; 92nd Ranger Battalion

Tonle Cham Airfield
- IATA: none; ICAO: none

Summary
- Elevation AMSL: 33 ft (10 m)

Runways
Direction	Length		Surface
Direction	ft	m	Surface
	3,000	914	laterite

Tonle Cham Camp (also known as Tonle Cham Special Forces Camp or Tong Le Chon Special Force camp) is a former U.S. Army and Army of the Republic of Vietnam (ARVN) base southwest of An Lộc in southern Vietnam.

== History ==
The 5th Special Forces Group Detachment A-334 first established a base here in 1967 to monitor communist infiltration from base areas in the Fishhook (Cambodia).The base was located beside the Saigon River on Route 248 8 km southeast of the Fishhook and approximately 14 km southwest of An Lộc.

Shortly after midnight on 7 August 1967 the PAVN 165th Regiment, 7th Division attacked the camp. Gunships guided by illuminating shells stopped the first wave of sappers, but a second assault penetrated the southern perimeter. Many of the defenders in that sector surrendered, only to be executed by their captors. A similar fate might have befallen the others had the camp's ammunition bunker not detonated. The explosion caused heavy casualties on both sides and forced most of the PAVN to flee. Although the PAVN assaulted the camp twice more that night, they had lost their momentum, and the defenders held. In the end the garrison lost 26 men killed and 87 wounded. A search of the area around the camp turned up 152 PAVN dead and 60 weapons.

On 28 November 1968 Lockheed C-130B Hercules #61-2644 of the 776th Tactical Airlift Squadron was damaged beyond repair after its nose gear failed while landing at Tonle Cham

Following the Battle of An Lộc the base was transferred to the 92nd Ranger Battalion in late 1972.

On 25 March 1973, less than 2 months after the Paris Peace Accords went into effect, the People's Army of Vietnam (PAVN) began a siege of the camp. The Rangers held out for more than a year before they abandoned the base to the PAVN on 12 April 1974.

== Current use ==
The base has been turned over to farmland and housing.
