= Đức Huệ =

- Commune
- Interactive map of Đức Huệ
- Coordinates: 10.770465°N 106.169409°E
- Country: Vietnam
- Province: Tây Ninh
- Region: Southeast
- Established: 16 June 2025
- Seat: Ấp Thanh Hòa

Area
  - Total: 134.13 km^{2} (51.79 sq mi)

Population (31 December 2024)
  - Total: 22,930
  - Density: 171/km^{2} (440/sq mi)
- Website: duchue.tayninh.gov.vn

Đức Huệ is a commune in Tây Ninh province, Vietnam. It is one of the 96 wards and communes in Tây Ninh province established following the 2025 administrative reorganization.

On 12 June 2025, the National Assembly of Vietnam adopted Resolution No. 202/2025/QH15 on the reorganization of provincial-level administrative units. Under the resolution, the entire area and population of Long An province and Tây Ninh province were reorganized into a new province named Tây Ninh.

On 16 June 2025, the Standing Committee of the National Assembly of Vietnam adopted Resolution No. 1682/NQ-UBTVQH15 on the reorganization of commune-level administrative units in Tây Ninh province in 2025, which took effect on the same day. Under the resolution, the entire area and population of Bình Hòa Bắc, Bình Hòa Nam, and Bình Thành communes in the former Đức Huệ district were consolidated to form a new commune named Đức Huệ (Clause 26, Article 1).
