= Frederick C. Weyand =

United States Army general

Frederick Carlton Weyand
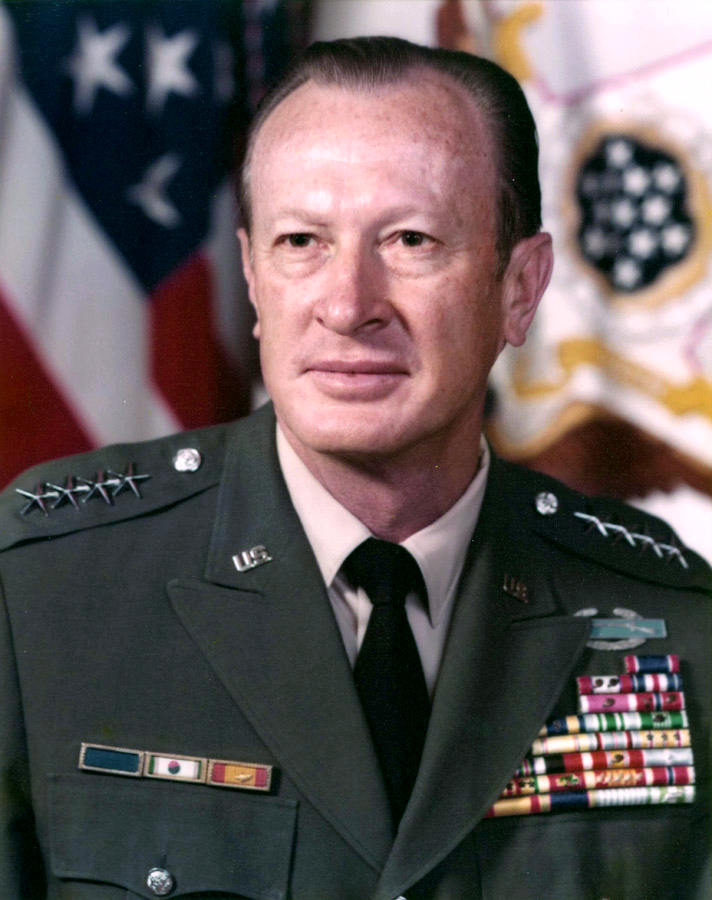
- General Frederick C. Weyand
- Born: 15 September 1916; Arbuckle, California, U.S.
- Died: 10 February 2010 (aged 93); Honolulu, Hawaii, U.S.
- Military career
- Allegiance: United States
- Branch: United States Army
- Service years: 1938–1976
- Rank: General
- Commands: Chief of Staff of the United States Army; United States Army Pacific; Military Assistance Command, Vietnam; II Field Force; 25th Infantry Division; 3d Battalion, 6th Infantry Regiment; 1st Battalion, 7th Infantry Regiment
- Conflicts: World War II; Korean War; Vietnam War
- Awards: Distinguished Service Cross; Defense Distinguished Service Medal; Army Distinguished Service Medal (5); Silver Star; Legion of Merit (2); Bronze Star Medal (2)

Frederick Carlton Weyand (15 September 1916 – 10 February 2010) was a general in the United States Army. Weyand was the last commander of United States military operations in the Vietnam War from 1972 to 1973, and served as the 28th Chief of Staff of the United States Army from 1974 to 1976.

== Early life and education ==
Weyand was born in Arbuckle, California, on 15 September 1916. He attended and graduated from Fresno High School. He was commissioned a second lieutenant in the United States Army through the Reserve Officers Training Corps program at the University of California, Berkeley, where he graduated in May 1938. He married Arline Langhart in 1940.

== Military career ==
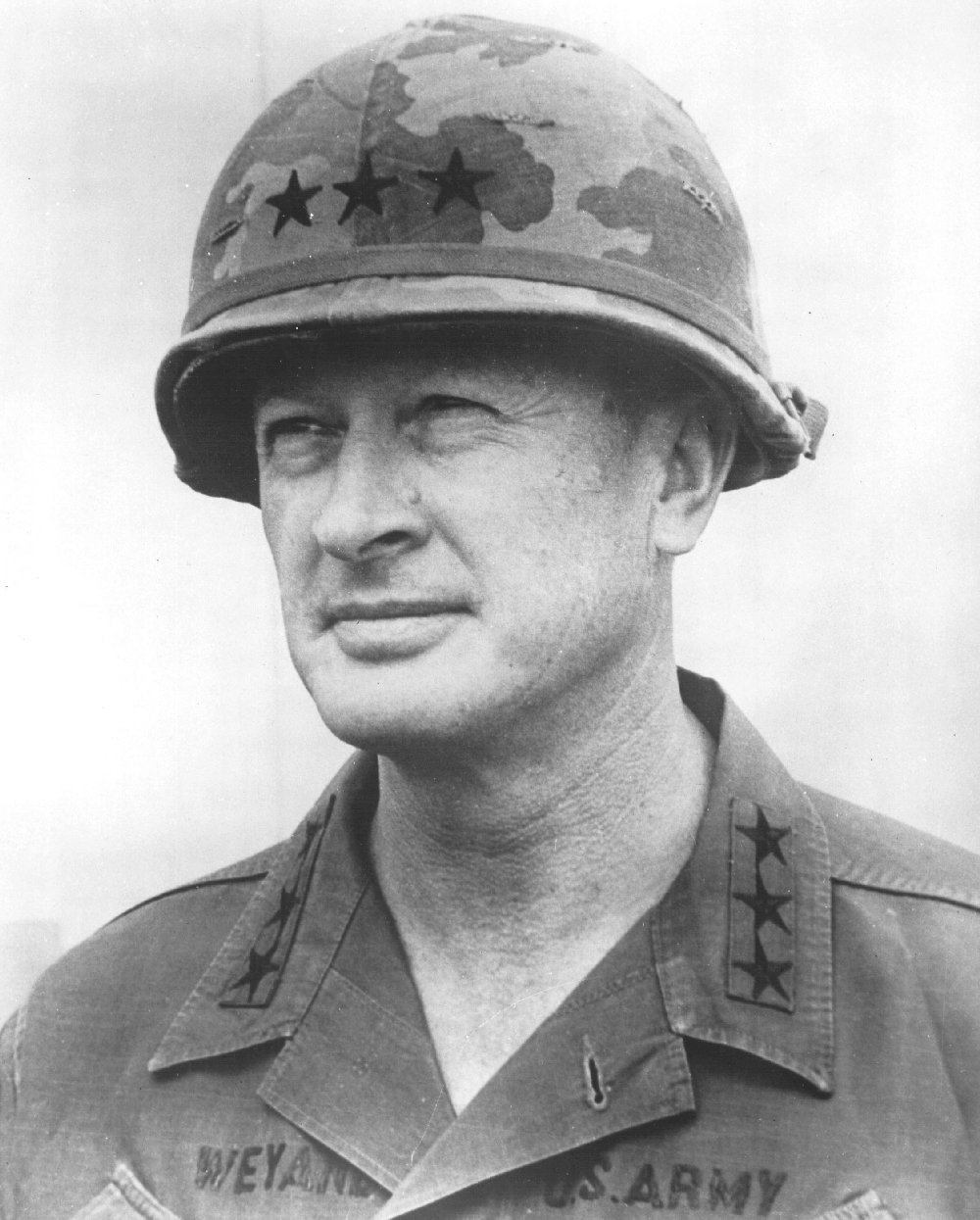
Lieutenant General Weyand as Commander of II Field Force in Vietnam

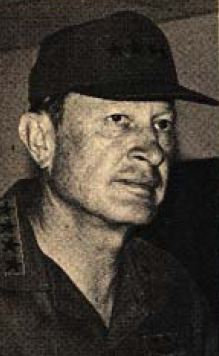
1975 photo of General Fred C. Weyand

=== World War II, Korean War and interbellum ===
From 1940 to 1942, Weyand was assigned to active duty and served with the 6th Field Artillery. He graduated from the Command and General Staff College at Fort Leavenworth in 1942 and served as adjutant of the Harbor Defense Command in San Francisco from 1942 to 1943. He moved on to the Office of the Chief of Intelligence for the US War Department General Staff in 1944. He became assistant chief of staff for intelligence in the China-Burma-India Theater from 1944 to 1945. In the immediate aftermath of the war he was in the Military Intelligence Service in Washington, D.C. from 1945 to 1946.

Weyand was chief of staff for intelligence, United States Army Forces, Middle Pacific from 1946 to 1949. He graduated from the United States Army Infantry School at Fort Benning in 1950. He became commander of the 1st Battalion, 7th Infantry Regiment and the assistant chief of staff, G–3, of the 3d Infantry Division during the Korean War from 1950 to 1951.

Weyand served on the faculty of the Infantry School from 1952 to 1953. Following this assignment he attended the Armed Forces Staff College, and upon graduation became military assistant in the Office of the Assistant Secretary of the Army for Financial Management until 1954. He moved on to become military assistant and executive to the Secretary of the Army from 1954 to 1957. He then graduated from the Army War College in 1958, moving on to command the 3d Battalion, 6th Infantry Regiment, in Europe (1958–1959). He served in the Office of the United States Commander in Berlin in 1960 then became chief of staff for the Communications Zone, United States Army, Europe from 1960 to 1961. He was the deputy chief and chief of legislative liaison for the Department of the Army from 1961 to 1964.

=== Vietnam War ===
Weyand became commander of the 25th Infantry Division, stationed in Hawaii, in 1964. He continued to lead the division as it was introduced into operations in Vietnam in 1965 and 1966. He served as the head of the 25th Division until 1967, when he became deputy, then acting commander, and finally commander of II Field Force, Vietnam responsible for III Corps Tactical Zone comprising the 11 provinces around Saigon. In 1968, he became chief of the Office of Reserve Components.

A dissenter from General William Westmoreland's more conventional war strategy, Weyand's experience as a former intelligence officer gave him a sense of the enemy's intentions. He realized that "the key to success in Vietnam was in securing and pacifying the towns and villages of South Vietnam" (Mark Salter, John McCain "Hard Call: The Art of Great Decisions"). Weyand managed to convince a reluctant General Westmoreland to allow him to redeploy troops away from the Cambodian border area closer to Saigon, significantly contributing to making the 1968 Tet Offensive a military catastrophe for North Vietnam.

Before the 1968 holiday truce for Tet went into effect, Fred Weyand got the feeling that "something was coming that was going to be pretty bad, and it wasn't going to be up on the Laotian border somewhere, it was going to be right in our own backyard." Westmoreland's obsession with the enemy hitting the Marines at Khe Sanh turned out to be a tactical feint, and the Communist strategy all along was a multi-pronged, simultaneous attack of key cities (Hue', Da Nang, Nha Trang, Quinhon, Kontum, Ban Me Thuot, My Tho, Can Tho, Ben Tre and Saigon)

Weyand's disposition of his forces denied the Communists from taking Saigon. A surprise attack, a key success of the Communist offensive would have been the capture of Saigon. He "had prepared better than he could have known for a battle he could never have anticipated." The Tet offensive had the "will-breaking effect" on the American psyche, equivalent to that of Dien Bien Phu to the French.

In 1969, Weyand was named the military advisor to Ambassador Henry Cabot Lodge Jr. at the Paris Peace Talks. In 1970 he became assistant chief of staff for force development. Later in 1970, he became deputy commander of Military Assistance Command, Vietnam (MACV).

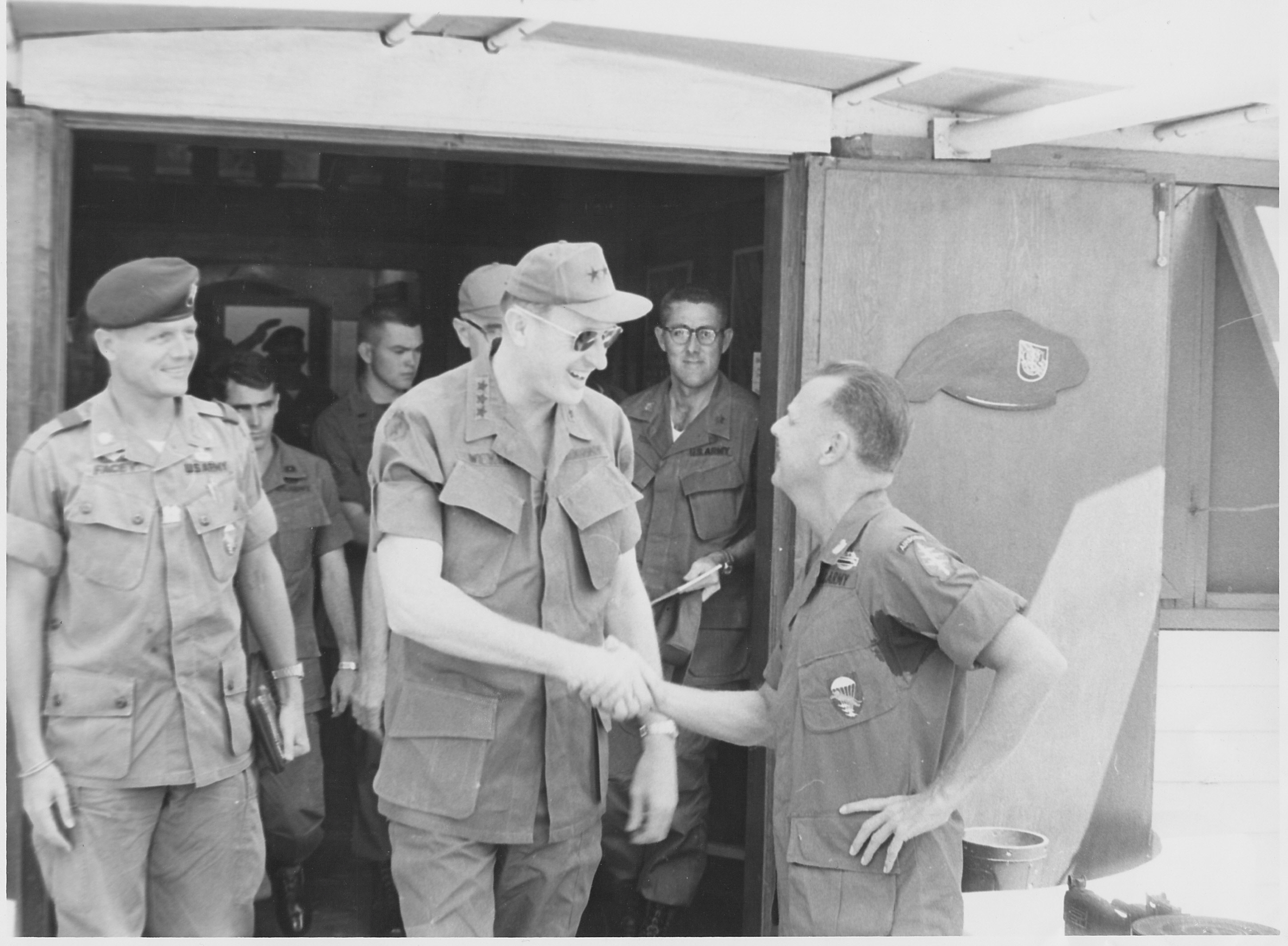
LTG Frederick Weyand stops in South Vietnam for update briefings at HQ 5th SFG(A) in Nha Trang, 22 March 1969

Weyand succeeded General Creighton Abrams, who was appointed as Army Chief of Staff, as commander of MACV on 30 June 1972. By the end of 1972 General Weyand had overseen the withdrawal of all United States military forces from South Vietnam. In March 1973, Weyand was awarded the National Order of Vietnam, first class and the Vietnamese Gallantry Cross.

=== Senior commands and Chief of Staff ===
Weyand served briefly as Commander in Chief of the United States Army Pacific in 1973 and was Vice Chief of Staff of the United States Army from May 1973 to October 1974.

Weyand was appointed as Chief of Staff of the United States Army from 3 October 1974 to 30 September 1976. As Chief of Staff he supervised army moves to improve the combat-to-support troop ratio, to achieve a sixteen-division force, to enhance the effectiveness of roundout units, and to improve personnel and logistical readiness. Weyand retired from active service in October 1976.

=== Confidential source for 1967 New York Times article ===
In an editorial in The New York Times on 11 December 2006, Murray Fromson, a reporter for CBS during the Vietnam War, stated that General Weyand had agreed to reveal himself as the confidential source for New York Times reporter R. W. Apple Jr.'s 7 August 1967, story "Vietnam: The Signs of Stalemate." General Weyand, then commander of III Corps in Vietnam, was the unidentified high-ranking officer who told Apple and Fromson (reporting the same story for CBS) that:

I've destroyed a single division three times ... I've chased main-force units all over the country and the impact was zilch. It meant nothing to the people. Unless a more positive and more stirring theme than simple anti-communism can be found, the war appears likely to go on until someone gets tired and quits, which could take generations.

The story was the first intimation that the war was reaching a stalemate, and contributed to changing sentiment about the war.

== Dates of rank ==
Insignia	Rank	Component	Date
	Second Lieutenant	Officer Reserve Corps	6 May 1938
	First Lieutenant	Officer Reserve Corps	24 June 1941
	Captain	Army of the United States	1 February 1942
	Major	Army of the United States	17 November 1942
	Lieutenant Colonel	Army of the United States	4 March 1945
	First Lieutenant	Regular Army	22 April 1946
	Captain	Regular Army	15 July 1948
	Major	Regular Army	1 July 1953
	Colonel	Army of the United States	July 1955
	Brigadier General	Army of the United States	29 July 1960
	Lieutenant Colonel	Regular Army	15 September 1961
	Major General	Army of the United States	November 1962
	Colonel	Regular Army	September 1966
	Brigadier General	Regular Army	August 1968
	Major General	Regular Army	August 1968
	Lieutenant General	Army of the United States	August 1967
	General	Army of the United States	October 1970
	General	Retired List	30 September 1976

== Awards and decorations ==
His awards and decorations include:

U.S. Awards & Decorations
Badges and tabs
Combat Infantryman Badge
Joint Chiefs of Staff Identification Badge
Army Staff Identification Badge
25th Infantry Division Combat Service Identification Badge
Personal decorations
Distinguished Service Cross
Defense Distinguished Service Medal
Army Distinguished Service Medal with four bronze oak leaf clusters
Silver Star
Legion of Merit with bronze oak leaf cluster
Bronze Star Medal with "V" device and bronze oak leaf cluster
Air Medal with Award numeral 9
Joint Service Commendation Medal
Army Commendation Medal with bronze oak leaf cluster
Unit awards
Army Presidential Unit Citation
Campaign & Service awards
American Defense Service Medal
American Campaign Medal
Asiatic–Pacific Campaign Medal with three bronze campaign stars
World War II Victory Medal
Army of Occupation Medal
National Defense Service Medal with one oak leaf cluster
Korean Service Medal with silver campaign star
Vietnam Service Medal with five campaign stars

Foreign Awards & Decorations
Personal decorations
National Order of Vietnam (Grand Officer)
Republic of Vietnam Gallantry Cross with five Palms
Vietnam Armed Forces Honor Medal (1st Class)
Zaire National Order of Merit (Knight)
Order of Boyaca (Knight)
South Korean Order of National Security Merit (Third Class)
Order of Merit of the Federal Republic of Germany (Member)
Unidentified decoration
Unit awards
Republic of Korea Presidential Unit Citation
Republic of Vietnam Gallantry Cross Unit Citation
Service awards
United Nations Korea Medal
Republic of Vietnam Campaign Medal with 1960– device
Korean War Service Medal

== Personal life ==
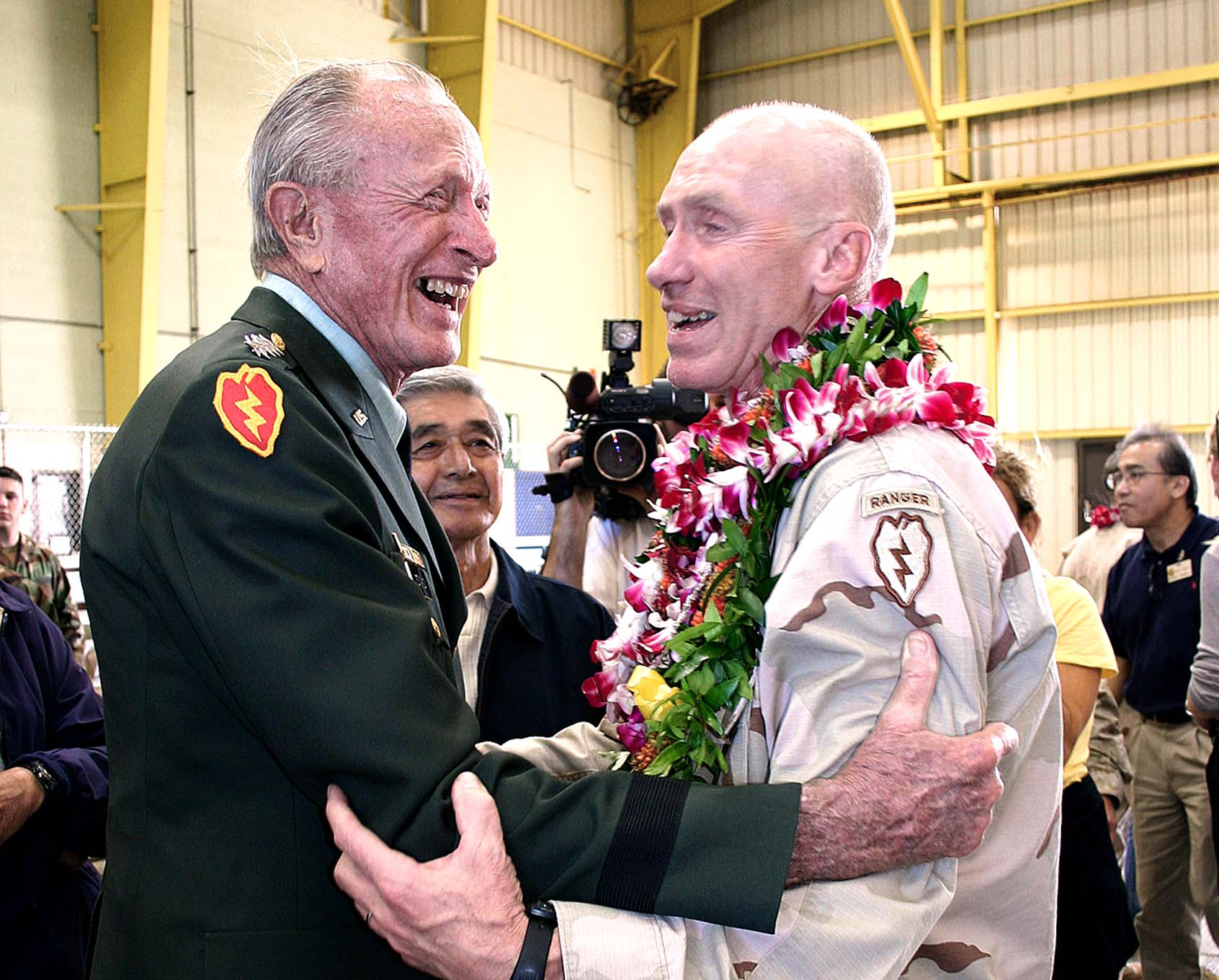
Weyand (left) in 2005

After retiring from the United States Army in 1976, Weyand moved to Honolulu, Hawaii, which was also the home of the 25th Infantry Division. He became active in Hawai'i community affairs and held a number of prominent business positions, including corporate secretary and senior vice president of First Hawaiian Bank between 1976 and 1982. He was an active member of the Rotary Club of Honolulu and a trustee of the now-dissolved Samuel M. Damon Estate, as well as the American Red Cross Hawaii Chapter, where he served as chairman of the board in 1992 and director of the Honolulu Symphony. He was active in the Sony Open golf tournament, Shriners Club, the East-West Center, the Asia-Pacific Center for Security Studies, and the Hawaii Theatre.

Weyand was also a member of the Vietnam Veterans Leadership Program and a member of several military and veteran organizations, such as the Association of the United States Army, the Air Force Association, the Military Officers Association of America, the 25th Infantry Division Association, the Go for Broke Association (100th Infantry Battalion, 442nd Infantry Regiment), the 3rd Infantry Division Association, and the associated 7th Infantry Regiment Association.

After his first wife died in 2001, Weyand married Mary Foster. He died on February 10, 2010, of natural causes at the Kahala Nui retirement residence in Honolulu, Hawaii.

Military offices
Preceded by Creighton W. Abrams	Commander, Military Assistance Command, Vietnam; 1972–1973	Command inactivated
Preceded by Alexander Haig	Vice Chief of Staff of the United States Army; 1973–1974	Succeeded by Walter T. Kerwin Jr.
Preceded by Creighton W. Abrams	Chief of Staff of the United States Army; 1974–1976	Succeeded by Bernard W. Rogers
