= September 1964 South Vietnamese coup attempt =

1964 coup attempt against ruling military junta

- Part of the Vietnam War
| Date | September 13–14, 1964 |
| Location | Saigon, South Vietnam |
| Result | Coup failed without bloodshed; Nguyễn Cao Kỳ and Nguyễn Chánh Thi gained more leverage over junta leader Nguyễn Khánh |

Belligerents
| Army of the Republic of Vietnam (ARVN) rebels | South Vietnam: Army of the Republic of Vietnam (ARVN) ruling junta |

Commanders and leaders
| Trần Thiện Khiêm; Lâm Văn Phát; Dương Văn Đức | Nguyễn Khánh; Nguyễn Cao Kỳ; Nguyễn Chánh Thi |

Strength
| Ten battalions | Unclear |

Casualties and losses
- None

The September 1964 South Vietnamese coup attempt took place before dawn on September 13, 1964, when the ruling military junta of South Vietnam, led by General Nguyễn Khánh, was threatened by a coup attempt headed by Generals Lâm Văn Phát and Dương Văn Đức, who sent dissident units into the capital Saigon. They captured various key points and announced over national radio the overthrow of the incumbent regime. With the help of the Americans, Khánh was able to rally support and the coup collapsed the next morning without any casualties.

In the month leading up to the coup, Khánh's leadership had become increasingly troubled. He had tried to augment his powers by declaring a state of emergency, but this only provoked large-scale protests and riots calling for an end to military rule, with Buddhist activists at the forefront. Fearful of losing power, Khánh began making concessions to the protesters and promised democracy in the near future. He also removed several military officials closely linked to the discriminatory Catholic rule of the slain former President Ngô Đình Diệm; this response to Buddhist pressure dismayed several Catholic officers, who made a few abortive moves to remove him from power.

In part because of pressure from Buddhist protests, Khánh removed the Catholics Phát and Đức from the posts of Interior Minister and IV Corps commander, respectively. They responded with a coup supported by the Catholic-aligned Đại Việt Quốc dân đảng, as well as General Trần Thiện Khiêm, a Catholic who had helped Khánh to power. Having captured the radio station, Phát then made a broadcast promising to revive Diệm's policies. Khánh managed to evade capture and, during the first stage of the coup, there was little activity as most senior officers failed to support either side. Throughout the day, Khánh gradually rallied more allies and the U.S. remained supportive of his rule and pressured the rebels to give up. With the backing of Air Marshal Nguyễn Cao Kỳ, commander of the Republic of Vietnam Air Force, and General Nguyễn Chánh Thi, Khánh was able to force Phát and Đức to capitulate the next morning, September 14. Đức, Kỳ and Thi then appeared at a media conference where they denied that any coup had taken place and put on a choreographed display of unity, claiming that nobody would be prosecuted over the events.

Convinced that Khiêm was involved in the plot, Khánh had him exiled to Washington as ambassador, and eased General Dương Văn Minh out of the political scene, thereby removing the other two nominal members of the ruling triumvirate. However, concerned that Kỳ and Thi had become too powerful, Khánh had Phát and Đức acquitted at their military trial in an attempt to use them as political counterweights. Despite his survival, the coup was seen by the historian George McTurnan Kahin as the start of Khánh's ultimate political decline. Due to the intervention of Kỳ and Thi, Khánh was now indebted to them, and in an attempt to maintain his power in the face of increasing military opposition, he tried to court support from Buddhist civilian activists, who supported negotiations with the communists to end the Vietnam War. As the Americans were strongly opposed to such policies, relations with Khánh became increasingly strained and he was deposed in February 1965 with US connivance.

== Background ==
General Nguyễn Khánh had come to power in January 1964 after surprising the ruling junta of General Dương Văn Minh in a pre-dawn operation, taking control without firing a shot. Because of American pressure, he retained the popular Minh as a token head of state, while holding the real power by controlling the Military Revolutionary Council (MRC). In August, the Vietnam War expanded with the Tonkin Gulf incident, a disputed encounter between North Vietnamese and American naval vessels; Washington accused the communists of launching an attack in international waters.

Khánh saw the tense situation as an opportunity to increase his power. On August 7, he declared a state of emergency, giving the police the ability to search properties under any circumstances, ban protests and arbitrarily jail "elements considered as dangerous to national security". He further enacted censorship to stop "the circulation of all publications, documents, and leaflets considered as harmful to public order". Khánh produced a new constitution, known as the Vũng Tàu Charter, which would have augmented his personal power at the expense of the already-limited Minh. However, this only served to weaken Khánh as large demonstrations and riots in the cities broke out—with the majority Buddhists prominent—calling for an end to the state of emergency and the new constitution, as well as a progression back to civilian rule.

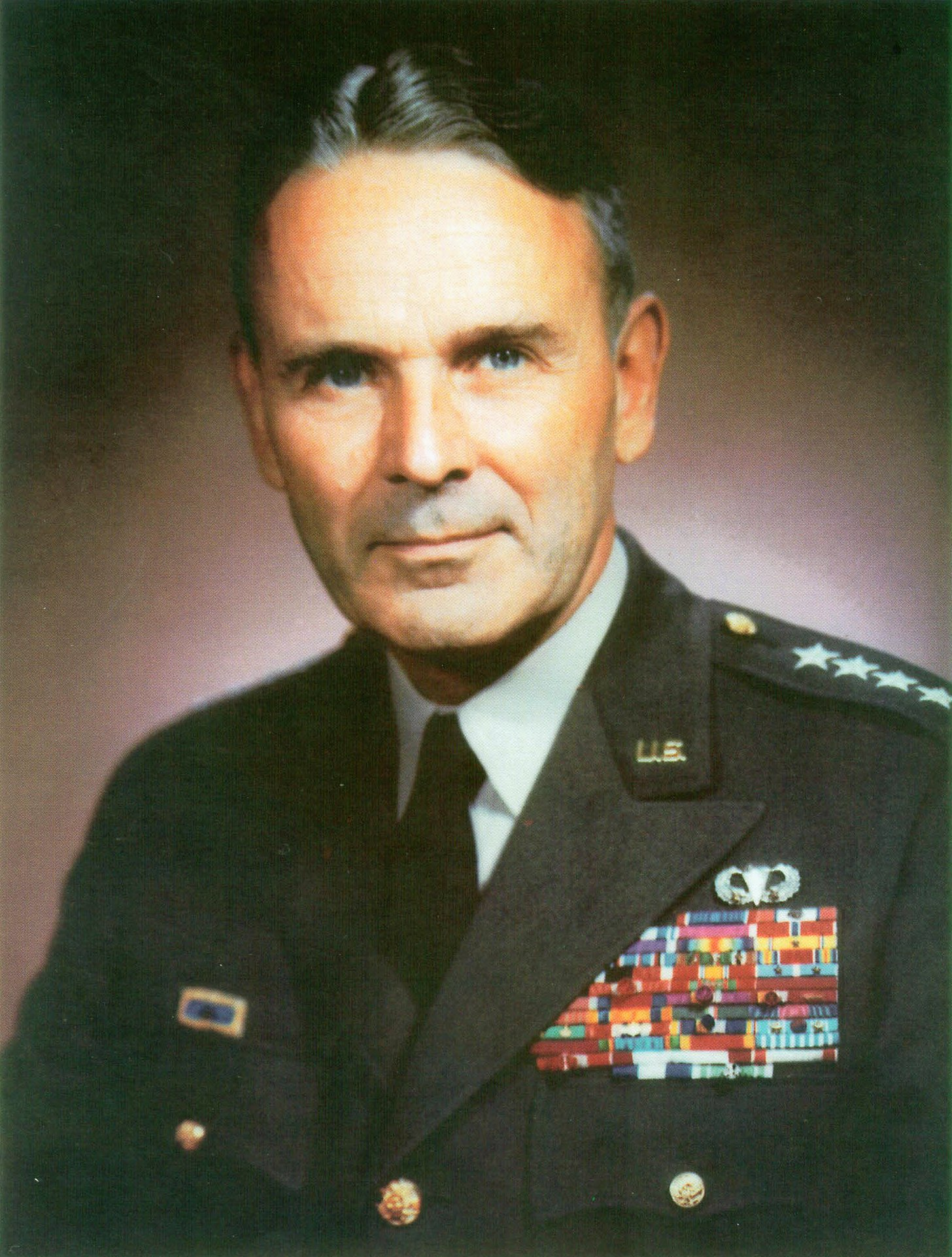
Maxwell Taylor, the US Ambassador to South Vietnam, opposed a coup.

Fearing he could be toppled by the intensifying protests, Khánh met with Buddhist leaders. They asked him to repeal the new constitution, reinstate civilian rule, and remove Cần Lao Party—a secret Catholic body used by former President Ngô Đình Diệm to infiltrate and control all aspects of society—members from power, and Khánh agreed. General Trần Thiện Khiêm claimed "Khánh felt there was no choice but to accept since the influence of Trí Quang was so great that he could not only turn the majority of the people against the government but could influence the effectiveness of the armed forces." Khánh publicly promised to reformulate the Vũng Tàu Charter, allow protests and liberalize the press. This encouraged more demonstrations by activists, and Khánh responded with wider concessions. Under the new arrangements, the new constitution would be repealed, and the MRC would disband. Khánh also promised to create an elected legislature within a year.

Many senior officers, particularly the Catholic Generals Khiêm and Nguyễn Văn Thiệu, decried what they viewed as a handing of power to the Buddhist leaders. They tried to remove Khánh in favor of Minh, and recruited many officers to their plot. Khiêm and Thieu sought out US Ambassador Maxwell Taylor for a private endorsement of their plan, but Taylor did not want any more changes in leadership, fearing a corrosive effect on the already-unstable government. This deterred Khiêm's group from acting on their plans.

The division among the generals came to a head at a meeting of the MRC on August 26–27. Khánh said the instability was due to troublemaking by members and supporters of the Catholic-aligned Đại Việt Quốc dân đảng (Nationalist Party of Greater Vietnam), whom he accused of putting partisan plotting ahead of the national interest. Prominent officers associated with the Đại Việt included Thieu and Khiêm. Khiêm blamed Khánh's weakness in dealing with Buddhist activists for the demonstrations in the cities and the rural losses to the communists. Thieu and another Catholic General Nguyễn Hữu Có called for the replacement of Khánh with Minh, but the latter refused. Minh claimed that Khánh was the only one who would get funding from Washington, so they should support him, prompting Khiêm to angrily say "Obviously, Khánh is a puppet of the US government, and we are tired of being told by the Americans how we should run our internal affairs." Feeling pressured by the strong condemnations of his colleagues, Khánh promised to resign, but no replacement was agreed upon and another meeting was convened.

After more arguing between the senior officers, they agreed that Khánh, Minh, and Khiêm would rule as a triumvirate for two months, until a new civilian government could be formed. However, because of their disunity, the trio did little. Khánh dominated the decision-making and sidelined Khiêm and Minh. The US military commander in Vietnam William Westmoreland deplored the concessions Khánh made to political opponents and lobbied Washington for permission to attack North Vietnam, saying that Khánh could not survive without it.

== Coup ==
At the start of September 1964, General Lâm Văn Phát was dismissed as Interior Minister, while General Dương Văn Đức was about to be removed as IV Corps commander. Both were removed partly due to pressure from Buddhist activists, who accused Khánh of accommodating too many Catholic Diệm supporters in leadership positions. Diệm had tried to use the loyalist Phát to help thwart the November 1963 coup, but the rebels managed to sideline Diệm's general and execute the president. Disgruntled by their demotions, Phát and Đức launched a coup attempt before dawn on September 13, having recruited ten army battalions. They gained the support of Colonel Lý Tòng Bá, the head of the 7th Division's armored section, and Colonel Dương Hiếu Nghĩa, a tank commander who had been one of Diệm's assassins. It appeared at this stage that the coup was supported by Catholic and Đại Việt elements. Another member of the conspiracy was Colonel Phạm Ngọc Thảo, who while a Catholic, was a communist spy trying to maximize infighting at every possible opportunity.

Đức and Phát's plot was supported during the planning phase by Defense Minister and triumvirate member Khiêm. General Huỳnh Văn Cao, a Catholic and Diệm loyalist while the former president was alive, claimed in a 1972 newspaper interview that Khiêm—by then prime minister—had asked him to join the coup. Cao said he had declined Khiêm's invitation, mildly mocking him by asking "You're part of the 'Troika' now ... won't you be overthrowing yourself?" Cao said he had pointed out that political upheaval in Saigon would be a bad idea because Vietnam was prominent during the ongoing US presidential election campaign and negative publicity could lead to a decrease in American public and political support for South Vietnam.

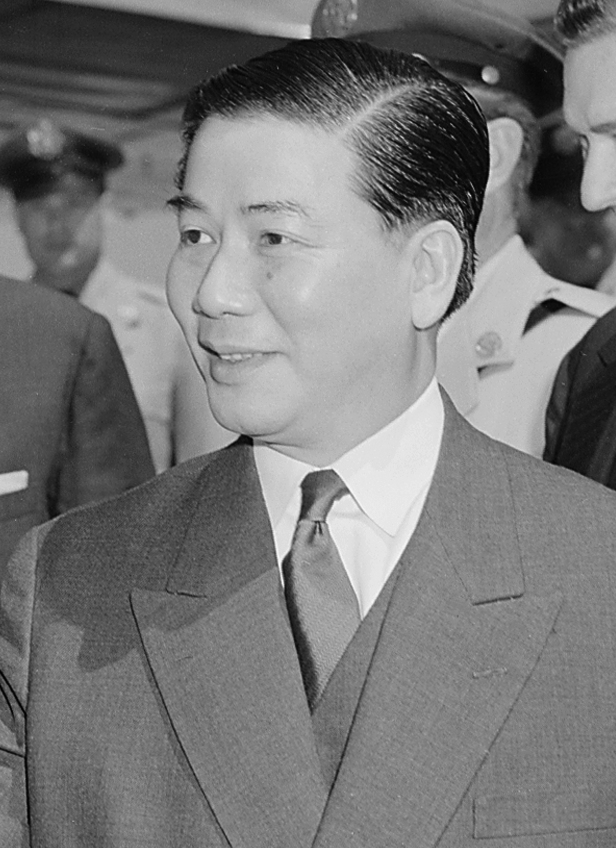
Ngô Đình Diệm, the President of South Vietnam from 1955 to 1963. The plotters praised him and promised to form a regime based on his legacy.

Four battalions of rebel troops moved before dawn from the Mekong Delta towards Saigon, using armored personnel carriers and jeeps carrying machine guns. After cowing several police checkpoints on the edge of the capital with threats of machine-gun and artillery fire, the plotters put rebel sentries in their place to seal off Saigon from incoming or outgoing traffic. They then captured communication facilities in the capital, including the post office, to prevent messages from being sent in or out. As his troops took over the city, Phát sat in a civilian vehicle and placidly said "We'll be holding a press conference in town this afternoon at 4 p.m." He said "This is nothing to worry about. Just a little operation against some politicians." The rebels set up their command post in the Saigon home of General Duong Ngoc Lam, who had been removed from his post as Mayor of Saigon by Khánh. Lam had commanded the Civil Guard during Diệm's presidency and was one of his trusted supporters.

The rebels took over the city without any gunfire, and used the national radio station to make a broadcast. Claiming to represent "The Council for the Liberation of the Nation", Phát proclaimed a regime change, and accused Khánh of promoting conflict within the nation's military and political leadership. He promised to capture Khánh and pursue a policy of increased anti-communism, with a stronger government and military. Phát said he would use the ideology and legacy of Diệm to lay the foundation for his new junta. Đức claimed the coup attempt was prompted by "the transfer to the capital of some neutralist elements, and by some pro-communists in the government". According to the historian George McTurnan Kahin, Phát's broadcast was "triumphant" and may have prompted senior officers who were neither part of the original conspiracy nor fully loyal to Khánh to conclude that Phát and Đức would not embrace them if they abandoned Khánh.

In contrast to Phát's serene demeanor, his incoming troops prompted devotees at the Catholic cathedral—who were attending mass—to run away in fear. The Buddhists however, made no overt reaction to the pro-Diệm coup, even though the former president had pursued policies that discriminated against them. There was little reaction from most of the military commanders. The Republic of Vietnam Air Force commander Air Marshal Nguyễn Cao Kỳ had promised a fortnight earlier to use his aircraft against any coup attempt, but he took no action early in the morning. At the same time, Khiêm and Thieu's lack of public action was seen as implicit support for the coup, as their criticism of Khánh's leadership in junta meetings and private attempts to remove him were well known. A US Embassy report to the State Department during the coup described Thieu and Khiêm as being "so passive that they appear to have been either tacitly supporting or associated with this move by Đức and Phát".

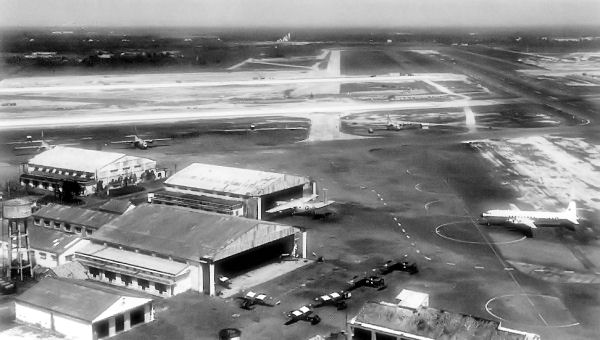
Tan Son Nhut Air Base, pictured here in 1962, was the headquarters of both the US and South Vietnamese military and a key target in any coup.

Some time later, Kỳ called in troops serving on Saigon's outskirts to come to Tan Son Nhut Air Base, the largest in the country and the headquarters of the military. He barricaded the soldiers into defensive positions and vowed a "massacre" if rebels attacked the base. A stand-off ensued between rebel tanks and loyalist troops around the perimeter of the base, but it petered out without any violence after the rebels stepped back. Kỳ had apparently been angered by comments made by a rebel source who claimed that he was part of the coup attempt. Kỳ was also well known for his hawkish attitude and close relations with the American military presence in Vietnam, and US opposition to the putsch was thought to have been quickly conveyed to him.

Phát and Đức could not apprehend Khánh, who had escaped the capital and flown to the Central Highlands resort town of Da Lat. Their forces stormed Khánh's office and captured his duty officers but could not find the junta leader. There was then a lull in the movement of troops and units. One Vietnamese public servant said that "All these preparations are the result of a big misunderstanding on both sides. I don't think either group will start anything, but both think the other will." Taylor was on an emergency flight from Honolulu—where he had been in meetings with senior American military figures—back to Saigon and he said the coup "certainly was unannounced and unheralded." In the mid-afternoon Khánh made a radio broadcast on a loyalist system, condemning the coup and calling on the military to remain loyal, claiming that support for the "rebellious leaders" would play into the hands of the Viet Cong.

=== U.S. intervention ===
Some U.S. advisers serving with units involved in the coup were driven off by rebel officers who did not want interference. The plotters thought the Americans would disapprove of their actions, as Taylor had recently talked of an "upward trend" in the war against the communists, while President Lyndon Johnson praised the "continued progress" against the Viet Cong. During the early hours of the coup, officials in Washington remained guarded in public, saying they were monitoring the situation and calling for calm, without explicitly supporting either side. Despite this, they did hint at a preference for the status quo: "hope that consultations among the leadership will shortly permit the Government to restore the situation in the city to normal". Behind the scenes, they used the respective American military advisers to lobby unit leaders against participating in the coup.

U.S. officials flew after Khánh to encourage him to return to Saigon and reassert his control. The general refused to do so unless the Americans publicly announced their support for him. The Americans then asked Khánh about his plans for the future, but felt that his answers betrayed a lack of direction. After talking to Phát and Đức, they concluded the same, so they decided to back the incumbent and made a press release through the embassy endorsing Khánh. Their decision was augmented by the rebels' inability to land a decisive blow, making the Americans more favorable to a continuation of Khánh's rule. The Voice of America broadcast a message emphasizing ongoing U.S. support for Khánh and opposition to the coup. It said the Americans had been monitoring the situation closely and that the incumbent regime was functioning; it further said:

The United States Government fully supports this duly constituted Government. The United States Government deplores any effort to interfere with this Government's program of convening a supreme national council to reorganize the structure of the Government on lines commanding broad participation by all important elements of the population.

At the same time, anonymous U.S. sources told journalists that the coup was concerning even if it failed, due to its destabilizing effects. Khánh also requested to Westmoreland that U.S. Marines come to his aid, and called for the Americans to formulate a "counter-plan" for him. Although no U.S. forces made landfall, marines were placed just offshore near Saigon and Da Nang in readiness.

=== Coup collapse ===
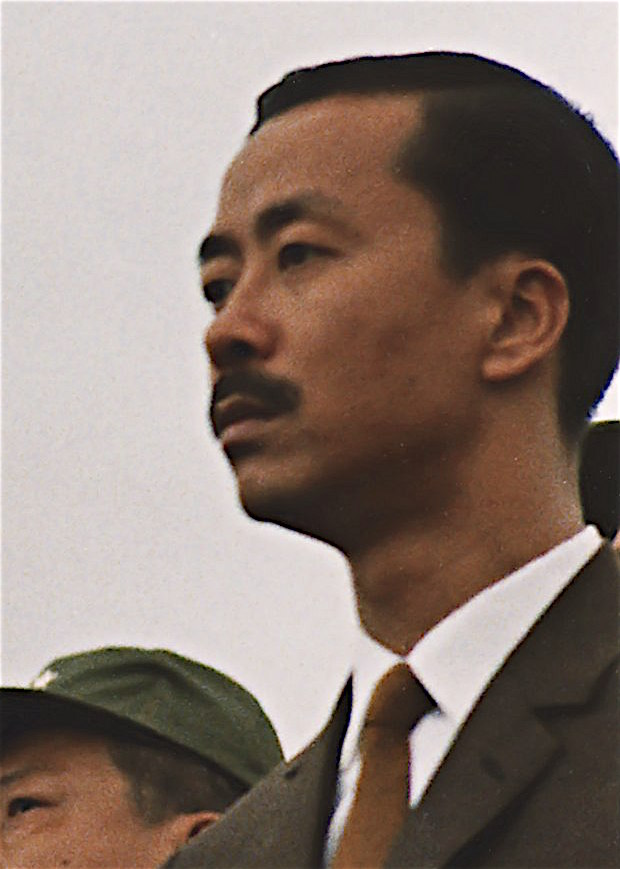
Kỳ was prominent in putting down the coup.

The U.S. announcement of support for Khánh helped to deter ARVN officers from joining Phát and Đức, who decided to give up. Westmoreland had spoken to Đức and reported to Washington that he "in no uncertain terms... informed him [Đức] that MACV, the U.S. Mission, and the U.S. Government did not support in any way his move, [and] advised that he get his troops moved out of town [Saigon] immediately. He said that he understood and thanked me. He seemed to be a shaky and insecure young man." Đức mistakenly thought that Kỳ and his subordinates would be joining the coup, but he later realized his misjudgement. When he found out he had been tricked into thinking the plotters had great strength, he gave up. According to an anonymous source, Đức was alarmed by Phát's strong statements during his radio broadcast, which made him reconsider his participation in the coup.

Brigadier General Nguyễn Chánh Thi of the 1st Division also supported Khánh. A CIA log of the coup proceedings said Thieu and Khiêm "issued expressions of firm support for Khánh somewhat belatedly". Kỳ then decided to make a show of force as Phát and Đức began to wilt, and he sent jets to fly low over Saigon and finish off the rebel stand. They circled continuously but never actually fired. He also sent two C-47s to Vũng Tàu to pick up two companies of South Vietnamese marines who had remained loyal to Khánh. Several more battalions of loyal infantry were transported into Saigon. Phát then withdrew with his forces to Mỹ Tho, the base of the 7th Division. In the early hours of September 14, before dawn, Kỳ met senior coup leaders after inviting them to Tan Son Nhut and told them to back down, which they did.

Loyalist forces regained control of the radio station and broadcast an announcement claiming control and ordering students and public servants to go about their normal lives. In the meantime, air force planes continued to set off flares to show their alertness, and rocket launchers and more weapons were deployed around Tan Son Nhut. Three battalions of paratroopers were brought in to patrol the airfield's perimeter.

== Media conference ==
As the coup collapsed, Kỳ and Đức appeared with other senior officers at a news conference where they proclaimed that the South Vietnamese military was united. They announced a resolution by the armed forces, signed by them and seven others, claiming a united front against corruption. Apart from Kỳ and Đức, the other seven signatories were Thi, General Cao Văn Viên, an Airborne brigade commander, the commander of I Corps General Tôn Thất Xứng, the commander of the Marine brigade General Lê Nguyên Khang, General Nguyen Đức Thang of the General Staff, the commander of the Republic of Vietnam Navy Admiral Chung Tấn Cang, and the commander of the Rangers Colonel Pham Xuan Nhuan.

The officers claimed the events in the capital were misinterpreted by observers, as "there was no coup". Kỳ said Khánh was in complete control and that the senior officers involved in the stand-off "have agreed to rejoin their units to fight the Communists", naming Đức, Phát, Lam and commander of the 7th Division Huynh Van Ton. Đức claimed that the leading officers had agreed:

- To put an end to attempts of the Viet Cong to seize power in South Vietnam
- To purge all Viet Cong elements and their "puppets" out of Government agencies and the ranks of the administration
- To build a unified nation without distinction based on religion
- To have the Government treat its citizens impartially

Đức further commented that fair treatment of citizens was the only way to defeat the communists. When asked if he now supported Khánh, Đức, "looking ill with weariness, if nothing else", simply nodded in agreement. Kỳ also claimed that no further action would be taken against those who were involved with Đức and Phát's activities.

After Khánh was again secure in Saigon, he said "I am very moved by the spirit of unity shown by the armed forces and population when faced with the threat of internal strife. I commend the patriotism of all the soldiers who knew how to put the higher interests of the nation above all else." Khánh said he would relinquish power and return to a purely military rule in two months time, but reneged on an earlier explicit promise to guarantee a purely civilian government, simply stating that the new regime would be one "that has the confidence of the entire people". The Soviet Union said the coup "demonstrated once again on what a rotten foundation Washington's policy in South Vietnam is based".

== Arrests ==
Despite Kỳ and Đức's media event, it appeared that Phát and Ton were remaining defiant after returning to the latter's 7th Division's headquarters in Mỹ Tho. Ton was apparently still maintaining a hostile political stance, and threatening to break away from the Saigon regime by overseeing the area around Mỹ Tho as a virtual independent state. Ton was reported to have threatened to cut the main highway from Saigon into Mỹ Tho and further south into the rest of the Mekong Delta, although it was thought he had no intention or means of assaulting Saigon militarily. Kỳ said a helicopter had been sent to arrest Ton but that a stand-off had developed. However, on September 16 Khánh had the plotters taken into custody. Đức, the rebel tank commander Nghia, Ton, and Lam were all arrested, followed by Phát, who returned to Saigon to turn himself in. A trial was then scheduled. Khánh removed three of the four corps commanders and six of the nine division commanders for failing to move against Phát and Đức.

== Power shift ==
Kỳ and Thi's role in putting down the coup attempt gave them more leverage in Saigon's military politics. Indebted to Kỳ, Thi, and the youthful clique of officers dubbed the Young Turks for helping him stay in power, Khánh was now in a weaker position. Kỳ's group called on Khánh to remove "corrupt, dishonest and counterrevolutionary" officers, civil servants and "exploitationists", and threatened to remove him if he did not enact their proposed reforms, as "the people and the armed forces will be compelled to make a second revolution". This was interpreted as a thinly veiled warning to Khánh that the younger officers were intent on holding significant power through the military apparatus, contrary to any plans for civilian rule.

Kỳ specifically said nine or ten other officers should be dismissed for involvement in the coup, but refused to identify who he had in mind. Some observers accused Kỳ and Thi of deliberately orchestrating or allowing the plot to develop before putting it down in order to embarrass Khánh and allow themselves to gain prominence and prestige on the political stage. In later years, Cao Huy Thuan, a professor and Buddhist activist based in Da Nang, claimed that during a meeting with Kỳ and Thi a few days before the coup, the officers had discussed their plans for overthrowing Khánh. Another conspiracy claim was propagated by General Trần Văn Đôn, who conjectured that Khánh had tried to provoke or bait rival generals, such as Khiêm, into revolting against him so he could defeat and remove them from the scene, thereby strengthening himself and boosting his political image.

The communists were pleased by the coup, as the South Vietnamese military was wasting its resources and energy on infighting. They did not make any attacks in the days immediately after the coup as they were worried their doing so might galvanize the divided society into action against a common cause.

== Retribution and trial ==
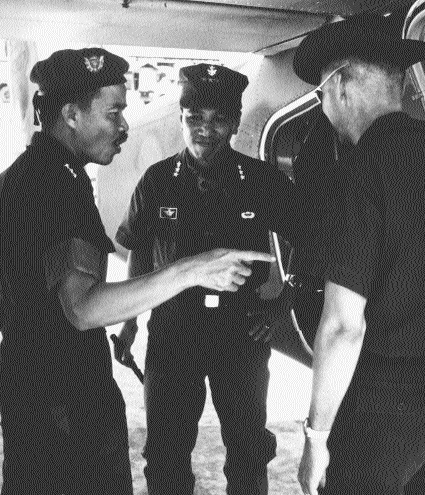
Thi (left) and Thieu (right) during the 1960s. Thi helped stop the coup, while Thieu was regarded as a tacit supporter of the rebellion.

Following the coup, Khánh concluded that his triumvirate partner Khiêm had played a major role in fomenting the coup and insisted he be sent out of Saigon. The Americans agreed and Ambassador Taylor organized for Khiêm to be made Saigon's representative in Washington. Soon after, Thao was dispatched to join Khiêm as his press attaché. During the coup, Minh had remained aloof from the proceedings, angering Khánh and keeping their long-running rivalry going. By the end of October, the Johnson administration had become more supportive of Taylor's negative opinion of Minh and concluded that US interests would be optimized if Khánh prevailed in the power struggle. As a result, the Americans eventually paid for Minh to go on a "good will tour" so he could be pushed off the political scene without embarrassment.

In the middle of October, Phát and 19 others were put on trial in a military court; observers predicted Phát would be the only one to face the death penalty, and that this would be reduced to a custodial term. Of the accused, 7 were civilians and 13 were military officers. They tried to appear confident and waved to family and friends. Đức told the assembled media the trial was unfair, stating "I believe in the supreme court of conscience". He then pointed to his subordinate officers and called them "national heroes". He denied media speculation he had backed down during the coup to avoid being bombed by Kỳ, claiming "I wanted to avoid bloodshed ... I am very proud of my decision".

Phát's lawyers started by asking for the charges against the conspirators to be dismissed, claiming the rebels had not been captured "red-handed", but this request was denied. They were more successful in another demand, managing to persuade the five military judges to allow witnesses to be called. The court agreed to their request to compel Khánh, Kỳ and the civilian Deputy Prime Minister Nguyễn Xuân Oánh to appear before the hearing. The accused officers claimed to have only intended to make a show of force, rather than overthrow Khánh. Đức claimed that the objective of his actions was to "emphasize my ideas" and said his actions did not constitute a coup attempt. Đức said that if he was intending to overthrow the government, he would have arrested public servants or military officials and denied having done so. On the other hand, he also admitted to being concerned by Khánh's policies. Đức said he had decided to end what he regarded as a military protest demonstration when Khánh promised to consider his concerns, and then returned to the IV Corps headquarters in the Mekong Delta. He claimed responsibility for the actions of his subordinate and co-accused, Colonel Ton, who led the 7th Division of IV Corps into Saigon. Ton agreed that Đức had ordered him to move his troops into the capital. During questioning, Đức did not refer to his coup partner Phát.

Asked why he had denounced Khánh as a "traitor" in a radio broadcast during the coup attempt, Phát said he had merely "gotten excited". Phát was asked about the collapse of his coup attempt and he discussed his visit to the American Embassy along with labor union leader Tran Quoc Buu on the evening of September 13. He said his discussion with Deputy Ambassador U. Alexis Johnson was "not too important" and played down its impact, claiming that Johnson's perfunctory use of French had limited any talks he would have wanted to have. This was contradicted by Buu, who told journalists that the discussion with Johnson had lasted for around 90 minutes. Of the civilians arrested, Buu was the most prominent. He was accused of involvement in trying to overthrow the regime because he had been involved in the meeting between Phát and Johnson. Buu acknowledged that he organized the meeting but said he was not involved in any plans for a leadership change. He claimed that US Embassy officials had phoned him during the coup to ask him to order his union members to refrain from agitating on industrial relations matters during the physically dangerous period. He said he then offered to arrange a meeting for the Americans with the coup leaders to see if a non-violent solution to the stand-off could be found. Buu said he was not acting in a partial manner and did not listen to Johnson's discussion with Phát. The Americans agreed with Buu's claims and privately thought he had been arrested for staging labor union activities and demonstrations unrelated to the military power struggle.

One week later, on October 24, the charges were dropped. Khánh then gave Đức and Phát two months of detention for indiscipline; their subordinates were incarcerated for shorter periods. According to Kahin, Khánh rigged the military trial so that Đức and Phát were acquitted so they could be used as a Catholic counterweight to the Young Turks faction of Kỳ and Thi, who in Khánh's eyes had become increasingly strong and ominous. Khánh also tried to build an alliance with the "Da Lat Generals"—so-called as he had put them under house arrest there after toppling them in the January 1964 coup—by recalling them to active roles.

On November 14, Khánh brought back Don as the deputy chief of staff, and installed fellow Da Lat General Tôn Thất Đính as his assistant. However, the Young Turks were cognizant of Khánh's motives, and continued to pressure him to sideline Don and Dinh in an attempt to gain more power for themselves. For his part, realizing his political base within the junta was precarious, Khánh had to seek more popular support. According to Kahin, "in what was strictly a marriage of convenience", Khánh had to try to ameliorate the only large civilian political force in South Vietnam, the Buddhist activists, who publicly called for a negotiated end to the war. This was regarded by Kahin as the start of Khánh's ultimate political downfall, as the Americans were resolutely opposed to any coexistence with the communists and their relations with Khánh declined steadily from then onwards. In December, Khánh and Taylor had an angry exchange after the junta dissolved the consultative High National Council, leading both men to call for the other to leave the country and prompting Khánh to repeatedly denounce the ambassador in the media. Khánh was eventually deposed in February 1965 by Kỳ and Thi with the backing, encouragement and some organizational help from the Americans.
