= Lê Văn Kim =

South Vietnamese Army general and leader in the 1963 military coup

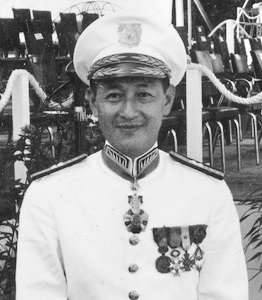

Chief of the Joint General Staff
- In office 5 January 1964 – 30 January 1964
- Preceded by: Trần Văn Đôn
- Succeeded by: Nguyễn Khánh

Secretary-General of the Military Revolutionary Council
- In office 2 November 1963 – 30 January 1964
- Chairman: Dương Văn Minh
- Preceded by: Position established
- Succeeded by: Huỳnh Văn Cao

Personal details
- Born: 1918 Bình Định, French Indochina
- Died: 28 March 1987 (aged 69) Paris, France
- Party: Independent
- Other political affiliations: Military
- Children: Lê Văn Phúc; Lê Văn Minh
- Parents: Lê Văn Nhẫn (father); Trần Thị Bộ (mother)
- Relatives: Trần Văn Đôn (brother-in-law)

Military service
- Allegiance: South Vietnam
- Branch/service: Vietnamese National Army; Army of the Republic of Vietnam
- Years of service: 1940–1965
- Rank: Lieutenant general (Trung Tướng)
- Battles/wars: 1963 South Vietnamese coup

Lieutenant General Lê Văn Kim (1918 – 28 March 1987) was a general of the Army of the Republic of Vietnam. He, his brother-in-law General Trần Văn Đôn, and General Dương Văn Minh, organised the 1963 South Vietnamese coup which toppled President Ngô Đình Diệm and ended in the assassinations of Diệm and his brother, Ngô Đình Nhu.

== Career ==
Kim began his career in the French Army, before transferring to the Vietnamese National Army of the State of Vietnam. He was the Chief of Staff of the 4th Infantry Division during the First Indochina War and supported Diệm during the power struggle against the Binh Xuyen in 1955. Kim was regarded to be the most adept tactician among the ARVN's most skilled tacticians, but soon fell out of favour with Diệm.

In the early years of the Diệm regime, Kim was directing the Land Development Program in the central highlands. Kim decided to financially compensate the highlanders tribes whose land had been confiscated, which the palace disapproved of. The regime felt it was sufficient to compensate the tribal villagers with livestock or alcohol. During this period, Diệm also survived a Vietcong assassination attempt in the highlands town of Ban Me Thuot, when a communist cadre opened fire at an agricultural fair. It was speculated by historian Edward Miller that the regime may have blamed Kim for the security failure.

Kim was then promoted brigadier general, but it was believed that Diệm did so to allow Kim to become head of the Vietnamese National Military Academy, which was regarded as a 'dead-end job' with no troops to command.

== 1960 coup attempt ==
On November 11, 1960, paratroopers from the Airborne Division led by Nguyen Chanh Thi launched a coup attempt against Diệm, and they quickly gained the upper hand before hesitating and negotiating, allowing Diệm the opportunity to call in loyalists to rescue him. During this period, the rebels unilaterally named Kim as their new prime minister. After Diệm regained control, Kim was later put under house arrest. According to Đôn, Kim was willing to accept the post but was going to stay silent unless the coup succeeded. Despite being cleared of wrongdoing, he was removed from his post as the director of the National Military Academy and transferred to Minh's unit.

== Junta ==
Kim was one of the leading figures in Minh's junta, and was the chief of general staff.

During the latter part of Diệm's rule, a centerpiece of the rural pacification campaign was the large-scale construction of strategic hamlets, fortified camps that were designed to lock out insurgents. This failed, however, as many were able to infiltrate the settlements and political affiliation could not be distinguished. It also angered the peasants, who were forced to abandon their ancestral lands and homes, and build new dwellings in the new villages. Many of these hamlets were subsequently overrun by communist attacks. Kim oversaw the future of the program for Minh and they decided to liberalize the system to try to win over the peasants. They forecast that they could reduce the insurgency's support by 30% alone through these less restrictive arrangements, citing more cooperative attitudes in Mekong Delta regions heavily populated with Hòa Hảo and Cao Đài. However this upset and aroused suspicions among the Americans.

=== Overthrow ===
A group of officers, led by Generals Nguyen Khanh, Tran Thien Khiem, and Do Mau were unhappy with their posts after the 1963 coup, and began plotting. They used Kim's assistant, General Duong Van Duc to concoct incriminating documents and purportedly show that Generals Minh, Kim and Đôn had been bought by French agents and were on the brink of declaring South Vietnam's neutrality and signing a peace deal to end the war with the North. Some of the documents were leaked to elements of the American presence in Saigon and were brought to the attention of some senior American officials. Khánh told various American officials that Đôn, Kim and General Mai Hữu Xuân, along with Minh, were "pro-French and pro-neutralist" and part of French President Charles de Gaulle's plan to neutralise Vietnam. Khánh claimed the fact that Đôn had invited two members of the French National Assembly—both from de Gaulle's party—to dinner. According to one source, Kim and Minh were also present, while another said that Kim, Đính and Xuân were there. Khánh alleged at the time that the generals discussed neutralization there, while Đôn and Đính always denied it. Lodge passed a report to Washington on January 20, in which he said that Đôn and Kim retained their French citizenship and "had never at any time foresworn the possibility of a neutral solution at what might seem to them the proper time." He said that although he thought their policies against the communists were effective, "none of us had ever discussed what the next step would be after the Government of Vietnam had reached a position of strength. Perhaps they did favor the French neutrality solution at that time."

On January 30, Khánh launched a coup, arresting Minh, Dinh, Đôn and Kim, claiming that they were part of a neutralist plot with the Việt Cộng and taken to Đà Lạt. Khánh noted that they had served in the Vietnamese National Army in the early 1950s, under the French colonial administration, although he did as well. An anonymous source close to the plotters told The New York Times that "We were anxious about them indeed...and we had conclusive proof that they had been talking with the French in terms of a neutralized Vietnam and that North Vietnam had given support to the plan," explicitly naming Kim and Xuân.

On May 28, 1964, Khanh put his rivals on trial. The generals were secretly interrogated for five and a half hours, mostly about details of their coup against Diệm, rather than the original charge of promoting neutralism. As all of the officers were involved in the plot against Diệm, this did not reveal any information new to them. The court deliberated for over nine hours. When it reconvened for the verdict on May 29, Khánh stated, "We ask that once you begin to serve again in the army, you do not take revenge on anybody." The tribunal then "congratulated" the generals, but found that they were of "lax morality" and unqualified to command due to a "lack of a clear political concept." They were chastised for being "inadequately aware of their heavy responsibility" and for letting "their subordinates take advantage of their positions." The four imprisoned generals were allowed to remain in Da Lat under surveillance with their families. However, there were reports that the trial ended in a festive manner akin to a party, as the officers shook hands and made up with one another, with Minh reported to have commended Khanh for his "fairness" before organising a celebratory dinner for the generals. All four generals were barred from commanding troops for a period; Kim was banned for six years. Offices were prepared for the quartet so that they could participate in "research and planning." Worried that the group of idle officers would plot against him, Khánh made some preliminary arrangements to send them to the United States for military study, but this fell through. When Khánh was himself deposed in 1965, he handed over dossiers proving that the four generals were innocent; the original documents that Khánh claimed proved his accusations of neutralism were neither presented to nor found by anyone.

During the period of house arrest, Khánh briefly released Đính and Kim when the United Front for the Liberation of Oppressed Races, known by its French acronym of FULRO, launched an uprising in the central highlands calling for autonomy for indigenous people. Đính and Kim were sent to Ban Mê Thuột in an attempt to end the standoff in September 1964, but after negotiations stalled, they conferred with Khánh and decided to order ARVN troops to crush the rebellion, which was carried out successfully.
