= 1965 South Vietnamese coup =

Coup attempt in South Vietnam

- Part of the Vietnam War
Date	February 19–20, 1965
Location	Saigon and Biên Hòa, South Vietnam
Result	Original coup failed; Nguyễn Cao Kỳ and Nguyễn Chánh Thi then forced Nguyễn Khánh from power and into exile

Belligerents
(South Vietnam) ARVN rebels	South Vietnam: ARVN ruling junta

Commanders and leaders
(South Vietnam) Trần Thiện Khiêm (South Vietnam) Lâm Văn Phát; Phạm Ngọc Thảo (spy of North Vietnam)	(South Vietnam) Nguyễn Khánh (South Vietnam) Nguyễn Cao Kỳ (South Vietnam) Nguyễn Chánh Thi

Strength
50 tanks, several infantry battalions	At least one infantry regiment and marine brigade

Casualties and losses
- None

On February 19, 1965, some units of the Army of the Republic of Vietnam commanded by General Lâm Văn Phát and Colonel Phạm Ngọc Thảo launched a coup against General Nguyễn Khánh, the head of South Vietnam's ruling military junta. Their aim was to install General Trần Thiện Khiêm, a Khánh rival who had been sent to Washington D.C. as Ambassador to the United States to prevent him from seizing power. The attempted coup reached a stalemate, and although the trio did not take power, a group of officers led by General Nguyễn Chánh Thi and Air Marshal Nguyễn Cao Kỳ, and hostile to both the plot and to Khánh himself, were able to force a leadership change and take control themselves with the support of American officials, who had lost confidence in Khánh.

Although Khánh had seized power in January 1964 in alliance with Khiêm, the pair had soon fallen out over policy disputes along religious lines, and the Catholic Khiêm began to plot against Khánh. Khiêm was believed to have helped plan a failed coup in September 1964, and Khánh exiled him as a result. While in Washington, Khiêm continued to plot alongside his aide Thảo, who was actually a communist agent bent on trying to foment infighting at every opportunity. Aware of Thảo's plans, Khánh summoned him back to Vietnam in an apparent attempt to capture him, and Thảo responded by going into hiding and preparing for his attack. In the meantime, Khánh's hold on power was slipping as his military support dwindled, and he became increasingly reliant on the support of civilian Buddhist activists who favored negotiations with the communists and opposed escalation of the Vietnam War. The Americans—most notably Ambassador Maxwell Taylor—were opposed to this and had been lobbying various senior Vietnamese officers such as Kỳ to overthrow Khánh, who knew that American-sponsored moves to depose him were afoot.

However, the Americans were not counting on Thảo and his fellow Catholic Phát trying to seize power on an explicitly religious platform, claiming fidelity to assassinated former Catholic President Ngô Đình Diệm and promising to recall Khiêm from the US to lead the new regime. This caused alarm among the Buddhist majority, who had campaigned heavily against Diệm's discriminatory religious policies in the months leading up to his ouster in November 1963. Although they wanted Khánh gone, the Americans did not want Thảo and Phát to succeed, so they sought out Kỳ and Thi in an attempt to have them defeat the original coup and then depose Khánh. During the initial attack, Thảo and Phát tried to capture both Khánh and Kỳ, but both men escaped narrowly, although some of their colleagues in the Armed Forces Council were arrested. Although the rebels were able to take control of Tan Son Nhut Air Base, the largest in the country and the military headquarters of South Vietnam, Kỳ was able to regroup quickly and retain control of the nearby Bien Hoa Air Base, using it to mobilize air power and stop the rebel advance with threats of bombing. Late in the night, Thảo and Phát met Kỳ in a meeting arranged by the Americans, where an agreement was reached for the coup to be ended in return for Khánh's ouster. By early next morning, the bloodless military action was over as Thảo and Phát went into hiding, and the junta voted to sack their leader Khánh, who was absent on a military inspection tour, thinking that Kỳ and Thi were on his side.

When Khánh heard of his ouster, he declared it to be illegal. After defying his colleagues and travelling around the country for a day in a fruitless attempt to rally support for a comeback, Khánh went into exile after being named to fill the meaningless post of Ambassador-at-Large and allowed an elaborate, ceremonial, military send-off to save face. Phát and Thảo were later sentenced to death in absentia. Thảo was hunted down and killed in July 1965, while Phát remained on the run for several years before turning himself in and being pardoned.

== Background ==
General Nguyễn Khánh had come to power in January 1964 after surprising the ruling junta of General Dương Văn Minh in a bloodless coup. However, due to American pressure, he kept the popular Minh as a token head of state, while concentrating real power in his hands by controlling the Military Revolutionary Council. In August, the Vietnam War continued to escalate following the Gulf of Tonkin incident, a disputed encounter between communist and American naval vessels off the North Vietnamese coast; Washington accused North Vietnam of attacking their ships in international waters. Khánh saw the tense situation as an opportunity to increase his authority. On August 7, he declared a state of emergency, increased police powers, banned protests, tightened censorship and allowed the police arbitrary search and imprisonment powers. He drafted a new constitution, which would have augmented his personal power at the expense of the already-limited Minh. However, these moves only served to weaken Khánh as large demonstrations and riots broke out in the cities, with majority Buddhists prominent, calling for an end to the state of emergency and the abandonment of the new constitution, as well as a progression back to civilian rule.

Fearing he could be toppled by the intensifying protests, Khánh made concessions, repealing the new constitution and police measures, and promising to reinstate civilian rule and remove Cần Lao Party—a secret Catholic organization used to infiltrate and spy on society to maintain President Ngô Đình Diệm's regime—members from power. General Trần Thiện Khiêm later claimed "Khánh felt there was no choice but to accept since the influence of Trí Quang was so great that he could not only turn the majority of the people against the government but could influence the effectiveness of the armed forces". Many senior officers, particularly the Catholic Generals Khiêm and Nguyễn Văn Thiệu, decried what they viewed as a handing of power to the Buddhist leaders. They tried to replace Khánh with Minh, but abandoned their coup plans after failing to get an endorsement from the Americans. Khánh blamed the government instability on troublemaking by members and supporters of the Catholic-aligned Đại Việt Quốc dân đảng (Nationalist Party of Greater Vietnam, usually known simply as the Đại Việt), who he accused of putting partisan plotting ahead of the national interest. Prominent officers associated with the Đại Việt included Thiệu and Khiêm. For his part, Khiêm blamed Khánh's weakness in dealing with Buddhist activists for the demonstrations in the cities and the rural losses against the communists.

In September, the Catholic Generals Lâm Văn Phát and Dương Văn Đức launched a coup after being demoted by Khánh in response to Buddhist pressure; Phát was a well-known Diệm loyalist. They were supported by the Đại Việt, Khiêm and Colonel Phạm Ngọc Thảo. While Thảo was also a Catholic, he was an undetected communist spy who tried to foment infighting at every opportunity. The coup failed and Khánh exiled Khiêm to Washington as ambassador, and his close friend Thảo was sent along as press attache. Concerned that Air Marshal Nguyễn Cao Kỳ and General Nguyễn Chánh Thi—who had put down the coup attempt for him—had become too powerful, Khánh had Phát and Duc acquitted in their military trial in an effort to use them as a political counterweight. However, the coup was seen as the start of Khánh's ultimate political decline. Due to the intervention of Kỳ and Thi, Khánh was now indebted to them. In an attempt to maintain his political power in the face of increasing opposition from within the junta, he tried to court support from Buddhist civilian activists, who supported negotiations with the communists to end the war. As the Americans were strongly opposed to such policies, relations with Khánh became increasingly strained.

== American encouragement of a coup ==
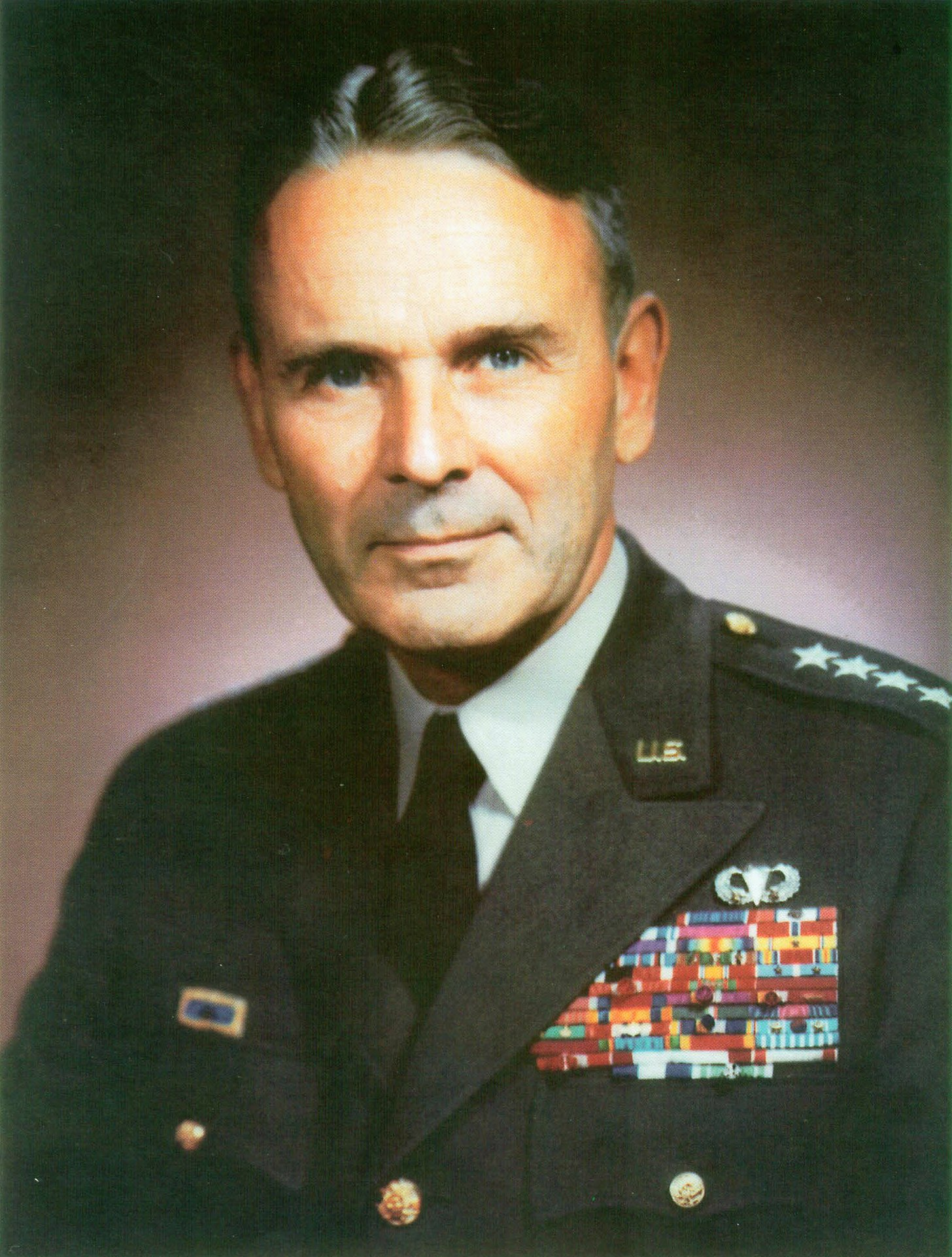
Maxwell Taylor, the US Ambassador to South Vietnam, was an opponent of Khánh and encouraged the other South Vietnamese officers to launch a coup.

By 1965, the Americans were looking for someone to overthrow Khánh, and these efforts were spearheaded by Ambassador Maxwell Taylor, who had begun encouraging other senior officers to move against Khánh since the start of the year, even though there was still significant hesitation and opposition to any regime change back in Washington. At the time, the US was planning to start a large-scale bombing campaign against the communist north and regarded Khánh's reliance on Buddhist support as an obstacle to their aims. Furthermore, Taylor and Khánh developed an intense personal antipathy for one another, which culminated in a breakdown in their relationship; in December 1964, Khánh's junta deposed the High National Council, a civilian advisory body that was designed to give a semblance of civilian rule. This resulted in Taylor angrily condemning Khánh and his generals in private to the point of suggesting Khánh resign the leadership. Khánh responded by threatening to expel Taylor, and going on a media offensive against the ambassador. Taylor threatened to withhold military aid, but the Americans could not do so because of their overriding desire to see the military defeat of the communists, and without foreign funding, South Vietnam could not survive.

In January 1965, the junta-appointed Prime Minister Trần Văn Hương intensified the anti-communist war effort by expanding military expenditure using aid money and equipment from the Americans, and increasing the size of the armed forces by widening the terms of conscription. This provoked widespread anti-Hương demonstrations and riots across the country, mainly from conscription-aged students and Buddhists who wanted negotiations. Reliant on Buddhist support, Khánh did little to try to contain the protests. Khánh then decided to have the armed forces take over the government. On January 27, with the support of Thi and Kỳ, Khánh removed Hương in a bloodless putsch. He promised to leave politics once the situation was stabilized and hand over power to a civilian body. It was believed some of the officers supported Khánh's increased power to give him an opportunity to fail and be removed permanently. Khánh persisted with the facade of civilian government by retaining figurehead chief of state Phan Khắc Sửu and making economics professor Nguyễn Xuân Oánh the caretaker prime minister.

Khánh's deposal of the prime minister nullified a counter-plot involving Hương, which had developed during the civil disorders that forced him from office. In an attempt to pre-empt his deposal, Hương had backed a plot led by some Dai Viet-oriented Catholic officers, reported to include Generals Thiệu and Nguyễn Hữu Có. They planned to remove Khánh and bring Khiêm back from Washington. The US Embassy in Saigon was privately supportive of the aim, but was not ready to give full support. They regarded it as poorly thought out and potentially a political embarrassment due to the need to use an American plane to transport some plotters, including Khiêm, between Saigon and Washington. As a result, the Deputy Ambassador U. Alexis Johnson only promised asylum for Hương if the plot failed.

Khánh's deposal of Hương further heightened American opposition to him and fears that his reliance on Buddhist support would result in his not taking a hardline position against the communists. Aware of declining US support, Khánh tried to initiate peace negotiations with the Viet Cong, but he only managed an exchange of letters and was yet to organize any meetings or negotiations before he was overthrown. In the meantime, this only intensified US efforts to engineer a coup, and many of Khánh's colleagues—mostly Catholic Dai Viet supporters—had by then privately concluded that he was set to pursue a deal with the communists. Many of these felt that Khánh saw himself as the "Sihanouk of Vietnam"; the Cambodian monarch had managed to avoid the Cold War for the time being by shunning both communist and anti-communist blocs. During the first half of February, suspicions and evidence against Khánh began to solidify, an example being his order to release the wife of communist leader Huynh Tan Phát from jail. Taylor's superiors in Washington began to align with his view, giving him more scope to agitate for a coup.

During the dispute with Taylor over the High National Council in December, Khánh had tried to frame the dispute in nationalist terms, in an attempt to rally support around himself against what he saw as overbearing US influence. This worked for a while, as Taylor had angrily berated Khánh's generals, but in the long run it failed, as South Vietnam and the generals' careers and advancement were dependent on US aid. Taylor hoped Khánh's appeals to nationalism might backfire by causing his colleagues to fear a future without US funding. On occasions during the December stand-off, Khánh had appealed to his colleagues to support the expulsion of Taylor from the country. The ambassador said that US support for South Vietnam would end if he was expelled, and the generals backed down, but Khánh said the military did not need US aid. The Americans were aware of Khánh's tactics and exploited it by persistently trying to scare his colleagues with the prospect of a military heavily restricted by the absence of US funding. After the December coup, Taylor credited the fear of US abandonment for having "raised the courage level of the other generals to the point of sacking him", as many were seen as beholden to their desire for personal advancement above all.

In the first week of February, Taylor told Kỳ—who then passed on the message to colleagues in the junta—that the US was "in no way propping up General Khánh or backing him in any fashion". Taylor thought his message had been effective and sent a cable to Washington claiming his words had "fallen on fertile ground". He then had the message repeated to seven other key generals. At this stage, Taylor and his staff in Saigon thought highly of three officers as possible replacements for Khánh: Thiệu, the commander of II Corps; Có; and the commander of the Republic of Vietnam Navy Admiral Chung Tấn Cang. A US Defense Department report described Có as an "outstanding officer ... friendly to Americans" and deemed Cang "a good leader ... anti-communist; friendly towards U.S". Thiệu was quoted in a Central Intelligence Agency (CIA) report as being described by an unnamed American official as "intelligent, highly ambitious, and likely to remain a coup plotter with the aim of personal advancement". At the same time, the CIA was aware that Có had become disillusioned with Khánh and had stopped attending junta meetings after Khánh accused him of "having been bought off by the Americans". Taylor also did not rule out supporting a return to power for Khiêm, despite having agreed with Khánh's decision to exile him after the September 1964 coup.

Taylor cabled Washington to say "I can well visualize [the] necessity at some time of using full U.S. leverage ... to induce our Vietnamese friends to get Khánh out of [the] position of commander-in-chief (from which he pulls the strings) and to install their very best governmental line-up." He also told his State Department superiors that Khánh was very likely aware of his machinations, but that he did not care about this. At the same time, there was also the question of finding another military-appointed prime minister to replace Hương. Taylor wanted Nguyen Luu Vien, Huong's deputy, to take over, and advised South Vietnamese officers who were on good terms with him to try to engineer this, but they were not able to get enough support. Eventually, Phan Huy Quát was appointed prime minister on February 14. Quát was a moderate Buddhist not associated with the political demonstrators, and seen as a compromise candidate who would be acceptable across the religious spectrum, albeit grudgingly. He was also regarded as being favorable to Khánh, who would not be around for more than a few more days to support, control or pressure him in any case. All the while, intelligence reports of Khánh's attempted dealings with the communists increased.

== Preliminary plots ==
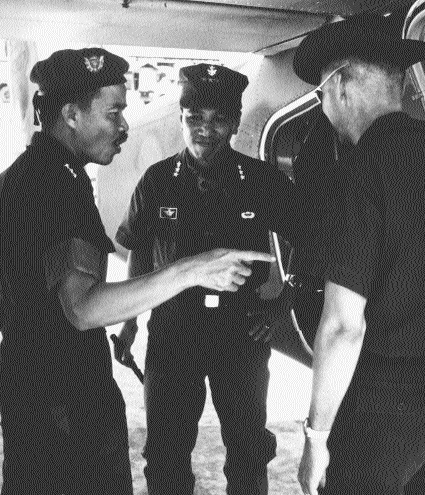
Thi (left) and Thiệu (right) during the 1960s. Thi helped stop the coup and overthrow Khánh, while Thiệu was regarded as a potential leader of a coup against Khánh.

Taylor's exhortations to the Vietnamese officers to remove Khánh were not a secret, and it had an unwanted side-effect; it accelerated coup action from figures not favored by Washington. The likes of Kỳ, Thiệu, Có and Cang were not yet ready to stage a coup, and their preparations were well behind those of Thảo, an unstinting plotter. On February 14, the commander of the Marine Brigade General Lê Nguyên Khang reported to an American official that he was involved in plotting against Khánh but said he and the other Young Turks were not ready because the military was not sufficiently united. He said they had to wait for a time when a coup could be carried out without generating unspecified side-effects. Khang was aware Thảo was planning a move with some generals who were now on the outer. He anticipated trouble in trying to keep his subordinates from joining Thảo, as his men might not wait for the younger generals to launch their coup if they thought it would never come.

At the time, the Vietnamese military was highly factionalized in complicated and unusual ways, and it was not clear where the sympathies of the respective officers lied. Thi was pro-Buddhist, but he and Kỳ had been suspected of mooting a coup attempt against Khánh in September 1964, and he had also been reported by the CIA in December 1964 as having vowed to kill Khánh. Although Kỳ had made comments hinting threats to Khánh, he was also known to be strongly opposed to nominally hardline Catholic Diệm supporters—such as Thảo—who were currently the frontrunners to launch the coup. Meanwhile, the likes of Thiệu, Có and Cang, whom the Americans favored, and were Catholic-aligned in more moderate ways, were cautious in comparison to the flamboyant and impetuous Kỳ and Thi. They maintained a guarded approach, waiting to see what the other officers would do, rather than boldly taking the initiative. For his part, Kỳ was reported by US intelligence to have privately predicted that Khánh would be ousted in an efficient manner without bloodletting and replaced by Thiệu.

== Plot by Phát and Thảo ==
In late December 1964, Thảo was summoned back to Saigon by Khánh, who correctly suspected him and Khiêm of plotting together in Washington. Thảo believed Khánh was attempting to have him killed, so he went underground upon returning to Saigon, and began plotting in earnest, unfazed by the prospect of being charged for desertion. The ruling junta appealed to Thảo in newspaper advertisements and broadcasts to follow orders to report, but he ignored them. Due to his Catholicism, Thảo was able to recruit Diệm loyalists such as Phát. In mid-January 1965, the regime called for him to report to his superiors in the ARVN, warning that he would be "considered guilty of abandoning his post with all the consequences of such a situation" if he failed to do so. At this time, it was still not known that Thảo was a communist agent who was deliberately trying to cause infighting within South Vietnam at every opportunity. With Khánh's hold on power shaky, an anonymous source said Thảo was worried about how he would be treated if someone else took over: "Thảo acted first, out of fear that if he did not, the other generals would overthrow Khánh and get rid of him as well. He knew that if the others overthrew Khánh his fate would be worse than Khánh's." During this time, Thảo kept in touch with elements of the CIA in an attempt to get American backing.

Between January and February, Thảo finalized his own coup plans. Thảo consulted Kỳ—who wanted to seize power for himself—and exhorted him to join the coup, but the air force chief claimed he was remaining neutral. Thảo thus mistakenly thought Kỳ would not intervene against him. Kỳ had actually been preparing his own coup plans for a fortnight and was strongly opposed to the likes of Thảo and Phát.

== Coup beginning ==
Shortly before noon on 19 February, Thảo and Phát attacked, using around 50 tanks and a mixture of infantry battalions to seize control of the post office and radio station in Saigon, cutting off communication lines. The tanks were led by Colonel Dương Hiếu Nghĩa, a Catholic member of the Dai Viet. He surrounded the home of General Khánh, and Gia Long Palace, the residence of head of state Sửu. When he was spotted by the press, Phát emerged from a tank to quip "This operation is to expel Nguyễn Khánh from the government". Thảo said he was going to bring back Khiêm from Washington to head the new regime. In doing so, he caught Khiêm—at least nominally—off guard, asleep in his Maryland home. When informed of what was happening, Khiêm sent a cable pledging "total support" to the plot. Rebel forces also surrounded the headquarters of the Republic of Vietnam Navy at the Saigon Naval Shipyard, apparently in an attempt to capture Cang. However this was unsuccessful, and Cang moved the fleet to Nhà Bè Base, downstream on the Saigon River, to prevent the rebels from seizing the ships.

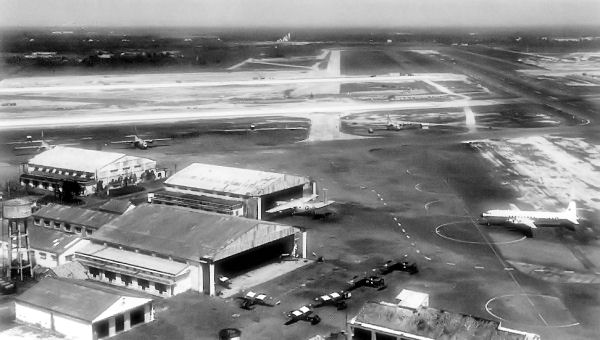
Tan Son Nhut Air Base, pictured here in 1962, was the headquarters of both the US and South Vietnamese military and a key target in any coup.

In the meantime, Thảo's main partner Phát headed towards Tan Son Nhut Air Base – the country's military headquarters – to capture it with an assortment of marines, paratroopers and special forces troops. At the time, most of the senior officers had been in meetings with American officials at Tan Son Nhut since the start of the morning, and Khánh left at 12:30. The plotters had secured the cooperation of someone working inside the Joint General Staff headquarters. This collaborator was supposed to have closed the gate so Khánh would be held up, but left them open. Some of the other senior officers in the Armed Forces Council were not so lucky, and were caught by Phát's troops inside headquarters, while other buildings in the complex remained under junta control.

Khánh had been scheduled to meet with Quát and his cabinet in a building at Tan Son Nhut. It was the new ministry's first meeting, and Taylor and General William Westmoreland, the commander of US forces in Vietnam, were present. Due to the poor relations, Khánh was sure they were plotting against him. He thus suspected their insistence on his attending Quát's first cabinet meeting to be part of a trap, and decided to excuse himself partway through the meeting to go "on tour", at which point he saw troops massing around the perimeter of the air field.

Khánh managed to escape to Vũng Tàu after his plane had just managed to emerge from the hangar and lift off as rebel tanks rolled in to block the runway and shut down the airport. The ground troops also missed capturing Kỳ, who fled through the Saigon streets in a sports car with his wife and mother-in-law. Kỳ ended up at Tan Son Nhut, where he ran into Khánh, and the pair flew off together. Khánh ordered three battalions of loyal troops to proceed to Saigon, while Kỳ ordered a loudspeaker plane to drone overhead and repeatedly announce "Brother must not fight against brother". In the meantime, Khánh tried to lobby Westmoreland through the phone for support.

== Announcement of coup ==
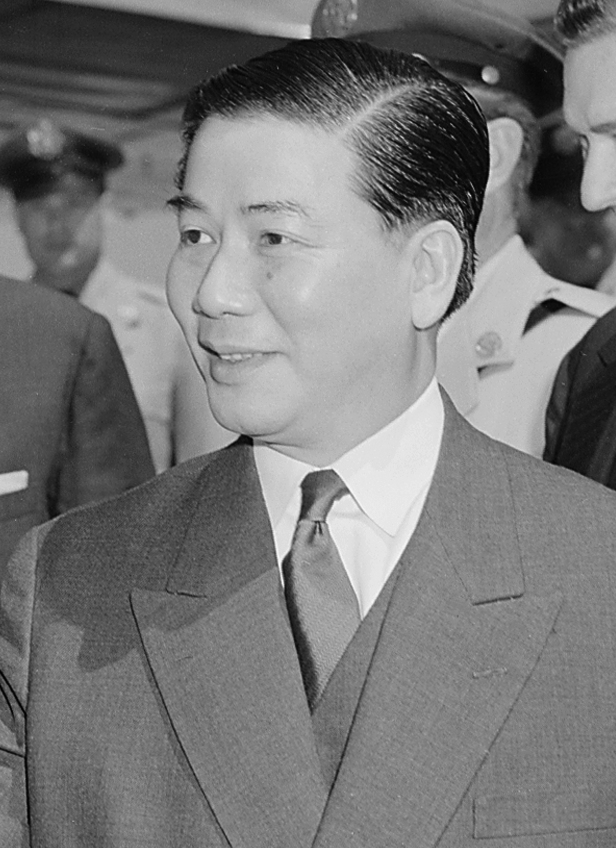
Ngô Đình Diệm, the President of South Vietnam from 1955 to 1963. The plotters praised him and promised to form a regime based on his legacy.

Thảo made a radio announcement claiming the sole objective of his military operation was to get rid of Khánh, whom he described as a "dictator". The coup group made pro-Diệm announcements; the Catholic civilian Professor Nguyen Bao Kiem said then-US Ambassador Henry Cabot Lodge Jr. "was wrong in encouraging the coup against Diệm rather than correcting mistakes". Lodge was one of the strongest advocates among US policymakers of Diệm's removal, and during his tenure as ambassador, refused to meet with the Vietnamese leader for extended periods to show his displeasure with Saigon's non-compliance with American advice. Thảo said he intended to recall Khiêm to Saigon to replace Khánh at the head of the Armed Forces Council. Following this, a Catholic major delivered a long speech, extolling the character and achievements of Diệm, and mourning his loss. This gave the impression the coup plotters were planning to roll back the regime to a Diệm-era position and punish those involved in Diệm's overthrow and subsequent execution in 1963. The rebels also made broadcasts pledging to aggressively fight the Vietcong and cooperate with the United States. Throughout the day, a series of anti-Khánh speeches were broadcast on radio, and the rebels claimed to have the support of four divisions; this statement was rebuffed by the junta as highly dubious and inflated.

The announcements shed more light on the nature of the coup group. American government analysts concluded that the rebellion was "primarily a move by die-hard neo-Diemists and Catholic military militants disturbed at the rise of Buddhist influence, opposed to Gen. Khánh and—in a vague, ill-thought way—desirous of turning back the clock and undoing some of the results of the November 1963 ouster of Diệm." Most of the military figures prominent in the coup were Catholics and members of the Dai Viet. Notable among Catholic civilian support for the action was Professor Kiem, a faculty member of the National Institute of Administration, a body that had US funding. Kiem was the leader of the National Defense Force (NDF), a body based on the secret Catholic Cần Lao Party that was used to sustain Diệm's autocratic rule, but had petered away after his deposal and execution. The CIA had reported that the NDF's members and associates counted among them some senior military officers including Có, Thiệu and General Nguyễn Bảo Trị, commander of the 7th Division based in the town of Mỹ Tho immediately to the south of the capital. Other notable civilian supporters of the coup were Catholic activists Father Hoan Quynh and Mai Ngo Khuc.

American intelligence analysts had thought General Trần Văn Đôn was involved in the coup with Phát and Thảo, but altered their assessment when he stayed in the mountain resort town of Da Lat instead of heading for the capital. Their changed assessment was reinforced by the announcement that Khiêm would be leading the replacement government if the coup was successful. Eight months after the coup was over, Đôn told the American historian George McTurnan Kahin that he had been plotting with Thảo, who had planned for him to become Defense Minister and Chief of Staff of the military, but said the Dai Viet and Kiem had insisted on installing the Catholic Khiêm. A month earlier, American intelligence analysts thought Thảo was planning to replace Khánh as commander-in-chief with Don. Ambassador Khiêm had been putting pressure on his bitter rival Khánh for over two months by charging him and the Buddhists of seeking a "neutralist solution" and "negotiating with the communists", and as soon as the coup broke, he was immediately deemed by media analysts as a key figure behind the action.

As Diệm had strongly discriminated in favor of minority Catholics and placed restrictions on Buddhism, the rebels' radio addresses caused an unsurprisingly negative response among the Buddhist majority. The Buddhist activist monk Thich Tam Chau spoke from a radio station in Nha Trang, exhorting his co-religionists to support the incumbent junta. The Diemist speeches also alarmed pro-Buddhist or anti-Diệm generals, such as Thi and Có, who had been part of the failed 1960 and successful 1963 coups against Diệm respectively, and feared retribution from Thảo and Phát. The speeches drove many anti-Diệm officers who may have otherwise been neutral or sympathetic to the coup, to swing more towards Khánh.

== Khiêm prepares to return from exile ==
By this time, Khiêm was preparing to return to Saigon to assist with the coup or take control if it had already succeeded. His colleagues had anticipated the Americans would lend them an aircraft to transport Khiêm back home, but second thoughts arose among Taylor and Westmoreland. The two American generals had lost confidence in Khánh, but the pro-Diệm ideology being expressed by Thảo's supporters alienated them, due to fears the coup plotters would destabilize and polarize the country if they took power. The Americans wanted Khánh out but were worried that Phát and Thảo could galvanize support for the beleaguered incumbent through their extremely divisive pro-Diệm views, which had the potential to provoke large-scale sectarian divisions in South Vietnam, playing into the hands of the communists and hindering wider American objectives. They were also worried by Thảo's support for the removal of Quát and the civilian components of the government, whom Thảo saw was "too susceptible to Buddhist peacemongering". In contrast, the Americans saw civilian participation in governance as a necessity. They were also concerned a Khánh victory would enhance his prestige and make his attempted deal with the communists more likely, so they wanted to see some third force emerge and defeat both Thảo and Khánh's factions.

The Marine Brigade commander, General Khang, appealed to the US Embassy in Saigon to not allow Khiêm to leave Washington. As a result of this, Taylor messaged the State Department: "Regardless [of] what ultimate outcome may be we feel Khiêm's arrival here ... would only add tinder to what this evening appears to be very explosive situation with possibilities of internecine strife between armed forces units ... Urge he not [to] try return [to] Saigon until situation more clarified." More generally, Westmoreland and Taylor by now decided it was imperative that Thảo and Phát fail, while Khánh should also be deposed by someone else amidst the chaos. Westmoreland gave orders to US officers who were advising South Vietnamese units to stop work if the unit was being used in the coup, and pretend to be neutral even though the American high command had already decided to intervene.

== Failure to capture Bien Hoa Air Base and stalemate ==
Phát was supposed to seize Bien Hoa Air Base, the second largest air force installation in the country, located in the satellite city of Biên Hòa on the northeastern outskirts of Saigon. This was to prevent Kỳ from mobilizing air power against them, but Phát failed, as Kỳ had already flown to Biên Hòa to take control after dropping Khánh off at Vung Tau. Phát could not challenge Kỳ's fighter planes, which were already patrolling the air above Bien Hoa by the time they arrived. Kỳ then flew a short distance southwest and circled Tan Son Nhut, threatening to bomb the rebels. Kỳ had never liked Thảo or Phát and did not want them to take power. In threatening to flatten Tan Son Nhut, Kỳ appeared unconcerned about the junta members who had been captured there, nor the more than 6,000 Americans who worked there, but intervention from Westmoreland stopped any air strike. A CIA report and analysis written after the coup concluded that "Kỳ's command of the air force made him instrumental" in preventing Khánh from being overrun, "until Kỳ changed his mind" on Khánh's continued hold on power. Meanwhile, most of the forces of the III and IV Corps surrounding the capital supported neither Khánh nor the rebels, and took no decisive action.

Taylor and Westmoreland began to lobby Kỳ and Thi, the two most powerful generals in the junta outside Khánh, hoping to enlist them in an effort to shut down Phát and Thảo while also removing Khánh. Kỳ was the most convenient outlet, as the air force along with both the American and South Vietnamese military headquarters were adjacent to one another at Tan Son Nhut, making communication easy, whereas Thi was commanding I Corps in the far north. Westmoreland communicated with Kỳ through the latter's adviser, Robert R. Rowland. Despite his inconvenient geographical location, Thi was seen as being hostile to Khánh by this point in time, and as a supporter of and commander of a region which was seen as the Buddhist heartland of Vietnam, he and his grassroots support base were strongly opposed to the Diemist pro-Catholic ideology espoused by Phát and Thảo.

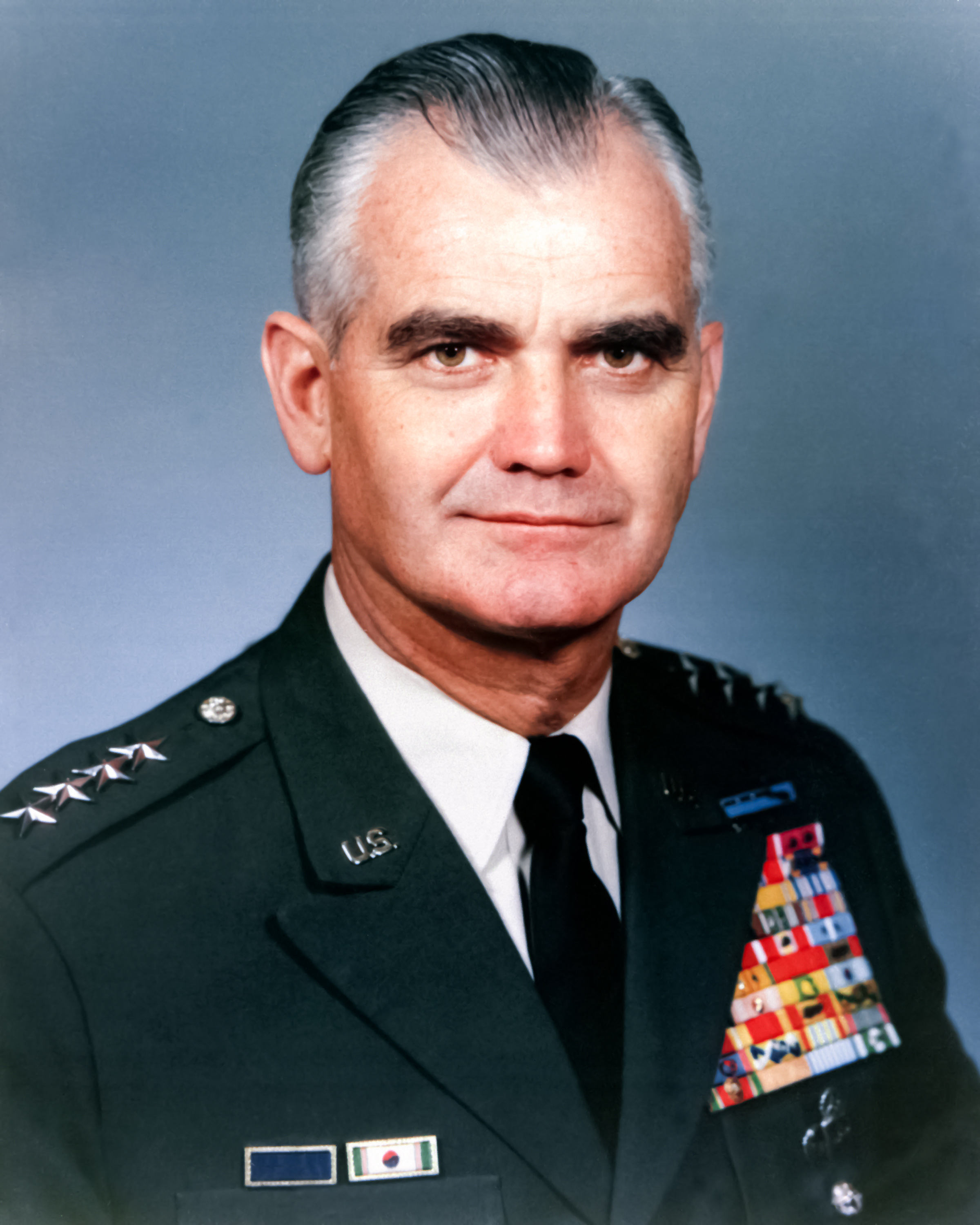
William Westmoreland, the US commander in Vietnam, tried to organize some forces to stop the coup and overthrow the incumbent Khánh.

In the short term, Taylor and Westmoreland unofficially designated Kỳ the duty of moderating between the coup forces and Khánh's loyalists, preventing bloodshed and keeping them apart until some further action was decided upon after an emergency meeting of the Armed Forces Council could be convened. Late in the evening, the 7th Division led by General Trị based in the Mekong Delta town of Mỹ Tho was preparing to move north into the capital to attack Phát and Thảo's forces, after Trị had been won over by Khánh in a meeting at Phú Lâm. However this was stopped after Westmoreland told Tri's American adviser at divisional level, a Colonel Gruenther, to tell the 7th Division commander to consult Kỳ before making any moves. Tri, whom the CIA had assessed as "anti-Communist and pro-US", was shortly afterwards reported to have halted the advance of his regimental-sized task force into the capital, at least for the time being. At the same time, a brigade of Vietnamese marines was being prepared to support Khánh in his fight against the rebels, but it is not clear whether this was to be coordinated with Tri's 7th Division and whether Tri's decision to stand his ground instead of attacking had an effect on the marines. There were also reports of elements of the 9th Division from Cần Thơ in the far south, and the 25th Division from the west moving towards the capital with around 30 armored personnel carriers. They were reportedly joined by the 5th Division who were coming in from Bien Hoa in the north. During all of these moves, Kỳ's hand was strengthened by the mistaken belief of Khánh and his faction that the air force commander supported them.

While this was happening, the Americans consulted with Thi and General Cao Văn Viên, the commander of III Corps surrounding Saigon, to assemble units hostile to both Khánh and the current coup into a Capital Liberation Force. The Americans provided Thi with a plane so he could fly in from his I Corps headquarters in Da Nang to Saigon to lead ground forces against both the rebels and Khánh. In the meantime, there was no further fighting as another round of negotiations was started. In the evening, Khánh came on the radio, using a transmitter believed to be in Ba Xuyen in the Mekong Delta. Khánh denounced the coup leaders as members of the Cần Lao. He said his loyalists were moving on Saigon and that the rebels had to disperse by the next day to avoid an attack. Close to midnight, there were reports that Khánh's loyalists had entered the capital and had passed a rebel roadblock in the Chinese business district of Cholon, around 3 kilometres (1.9 mi) west of central Saigon. It was reported the troops manning the roadblock did not attempt to stop Khánh's men.

== Coup collapse ==
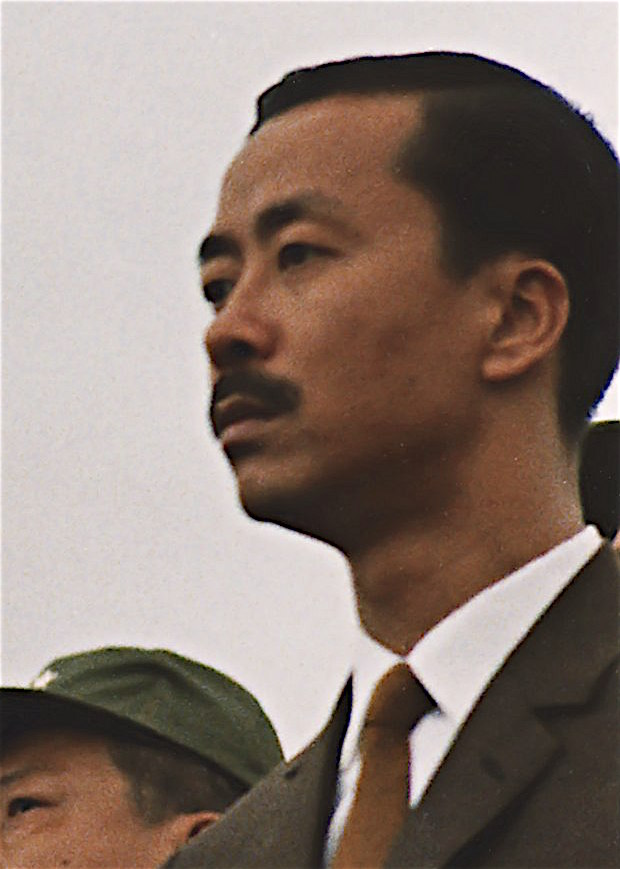
Kỳ was a key figure in stopping the coup and then removing Khánh.

At 20:00, Phát and Thảo met Kỳ in a meeting at Bien Hoa Air Base organized by the Americans, and insisted on Khánh's removal from power. The coup collapsed when, between midnight and dawn, anti-Thảo forces swept into the city from the south along with some components of the 7th Airborne Brigade loyal to Kỳ from Bien Hoa in the north. Whether the rebels were genuinely defeated by the overwhelming show of strength or whether a deal was struck to end the revolt in exchange for Khánh's ouster is disputed, although a large majority support the latter. According to the second version, Phát and Thảo agreed to free the members of the Armed Forces Council they had arrested and withdraw in exchange for Khánh's complete removal from power. Possibly as a means of saving face, Phát and Thảo were also given an appointment with the figurehead chief of state Sửu, who was under the close control of the junta, to "order" him to sign a decree stripping Khánh of the leadership of the military and organizing a meeting of the junta and Prime Minister Quát's civilian cabinet. During the early morning, while the radio station was still in the hands of the rebels, a message attributed to Sửu was read out; it announced Khánh's removal. However, the authenticity of the announcement was put into doubt when paratroopers wrested control of the station from the rebels and Sửu then spoke in person, saying he was trying to get into contact with both factions and convince them to eschew bloodshed. Later the radio station played a pre-recorded speech by Khánh claiming he had regained control of the situation. There were no injuries or deaths in the coup.

== Khánh ousted ==
Phát changed into civilian clothes, and made a broadcast stating "We have capitulated", before fleeing with Colonel Huynh Van Ton. Thảo broadcast a message saying the coup had been effective in removing Khánh. This was not the case as yet, but the Armed Forces Council later adopted a vote of no confidence in Khánh. Later in the morning, while on the run, Thảo made a broadcast using a military radio system to call for Khánh's departure and defend his actions, which he described as being in the best interest of the nation. Eager to remove Khánh, the Americans provided aircraft to transport the officers, Quát, and his civilian cabinet to the meeting at short notice. The motion was precipitated by Thi, who gained the support of Kỳ, and the final vote was unanimous. Sửu and Quát, who were not members of the Armed Forces Council, concurred with the military's decision to depose Khánh. Kỳ, Thi and Thiệu became the key figures in a junta that continued with Sửu and Quát as a civilian front, although General Trần Văn Minh became the nominal commander-in-chief of the armed forces. The junta ordered Khánh to leave South Vietnam immediately, and made a show of support for Quát and his civilian ministry.

Khánh was not present at his ouster, because he was north of Saigon, inspecting a display of captured communist weapons. When he heard of what was happening via a phone call from the junta secretary, General Huỳnh Văn Cao, he became angry and refused to accept his fate. Khánh's contended that only a full sitting of the Armed Forces Council, him included, had the power to make a leadership change. Khánh told Cao of his intention to resist what he saw as an illegal seizure of power. Having concluded that Khánh would fight to the bitter end, Cao went and saw Westmoreland in an open request for help. Westmoreland sent Rowland to meet with the eight available members of the AFC—Kỳ, Thi, Cao, Thiệu, Minh, Khang, Có and Phạm Văn Đồng—to devise a plan to thwart Khánh's attempts to reestablish himself.

=== Khánh's last stand ===
Khánh used his personal aircraft to fly to different provinces, trying to rally support and promising to promote would-be allies. He flew to Vũng Tàu, his favorite retreat, before travelling to Cần Thơ, the main city in the Mekong Delta. He then proceeded to Sóc Trăng, a town near the border with Cambodia. However, he received little support. Despite being forced out of power, Khánh refused to entertain the concept, calling Thi through an intermediary and informing him of his removal from the command of I Corps. The deposed leader's attempted command was met with harsh words from Thi. Having ousted Khánh, the generals held an afternoon press conference, claiming no decision had been definitively made. Nevertheless, they assailed Khánh as a "troublemaker" who was lethargic in pursuing the Vietcong, and accused him of being obsessed with power and politics.

By the end of the evening, Khánh was in Da Lat when his plane ran out of fuel, and no pumps were open at the time, so he was marooned there for the night. He phoned Saigon asking for re-supply, but his rivals denied his wish. Fearing a Khánh comeback, the Armed Force Council met again and unanimously resolved to make contingency plans to repel any counter-insurrection by Khánh. Westmoreland sent Colonel Jasper Wilson, Khánh's former confidant and adviser at corps level, to go to Da Lat to convince Khánh to resign and allow a new military leadership to take the reins. A year earlier, Wilson had helped Khánh depose Minh. Khánh initially refused to depart, calling the coup an American initiative and saying if he capitulated now, it would simply prove that the Americans were involved, as Wilson had been sent to tell him to leave.

Khánh finally agreed to leave if he was given a dignified send-off, so the other generals arranged a ceremonial farewell at Tan Son Nhut on February 24. Military bands played as he theatrically bent down and picked up some loose dirt before putting it in his pocket; Khánh said he was taking his beloved homeland with him, and vowed to one day return. His enemies, the remaining Vietnamese officers, most notably Kỳ and Thi, as well as Taylor, all met him at the airport. The foes managed smiles and handshakes for the media cameras. To make the coup "appear as much as possible the doing of Vietnamese themselves", Taylor had not made any public statement after Khánh's ouster, on orders from the State Department. Wearing his Grand Cross of the National Order, and carrying two more plastic bags filled with Vietnamese soil, Khánh then left as Ambassador-at-Large, and was sent on a meaningless world tour, starting with a report to the United Nations in New York City.

== Repercussions ==
Phát and Thảo were stripped of their ranks, but nothing was initially done as far as prosecuting or sentencing them for their involvement in the coup. The new junta decided to ignore Khiêm's actions and he remained in Washington as the ambassador, with no further action taken. Phát and Thảo stayed in hiding in Catholic villages. They offered to surrender and support the government if they and their officers were granted amnesty.

In May 1965, a military tribunal under Kỳ sentenced both Thảo and Phát, who were still on the run, to death in absentia. As a result, Thảo had little choice but to move around indefinitely or attempt to seize power in order to save himself. He chose the latter. On May 20, a few officers and around 40 civilians, predominantly Catholic, were arrested on charges of attempting to assassinate Quát and kidnap Kỳ among others. Several of the arrested were known supporters of Thảo and believed to be abetting him in evading the authorities. In July 1965, he was reported dead in unclear circumstances after being hunted down; an official report claimed he died of injuries while on a helicopter taking him to Saigon, after being captured north of the city. It was generally assumed he was murdered or tortured to death on the orders of some junta members. Phát remained on the run for three years. During that time, Kỳ's power was eclipsed by Thiệu in a continuing power struggle, and the latter removed Kỳ supporters in the military from positions of high power. In June 1968, Phát came out of hiding and surrendered himself to the authorities. He was pardoned by a military court in August and released.

After he too had been exiled the following year, Thi said "It was necessary to move against him because our army was dependent on the Americans, and we could not get along without them." Thi accused overseas-based Diệm supporters for the coup. Despite his failure to take power, Khiêm said Khánh's downfall made him "very happy. I think my objective has been realized." The Soviet Union responded to the coup by saying "The farce will go on" and lampooning South Vietnam's "bankrupt politicians and warriors".
