= Trần Văn Đôn =

South Vietnamese military officer and politician (1917–1997)

Deputy Prime Minister of South Vietnam
- In office 14 April 1975 – 28 April 1975 Serving with Dương Kích Nhưỡng
- Prime Minister: Nguyễn Bá Cẩn
- Preceded by: Nguyễn Lưu Viên
- Succeeded by: Hồ Văn Minh

Minister of National Defense
- In office 14 April 1975 – 28 April 1975
- Prime Minister: Nguyễn Bá Cẩn
- Preceded by: Trần Thiện Khiêm
- Succeeded by: Nguyễn Hữu Bầu
- In office 4 November 1963 – 30 January 1964
- Prime Minister: Nguyễn Ngọc Thơ
- Preceded by: Ngô Đình Diệm
- Succeeded by: Trần Thiện Khiêm

Member of the House of Representatives of South Vietnam
- In office 31 October 1971 – 14 April 1975 Serving with: Dinh Văn Rơi; Hồ Ngọc Cẩn; Mai Ngọc Được; Nguyễn Văn Hàm; Tạ Thành Hội
- Preceded by: Phạm Tân Nhơ; Trần Văn Phiên; Nguyễn Biên; Nguyễn An
- Succeeded by: Position abolished
- Constituency: Quảng Ngãi province

Personal details
- Born: 17 August 1917 Bordeaux, France
- Died: 1998 (aged 80–81) Arkansas, U.S.
- Party: Independent
- Other political affiliations: National Social Democratic Front (Big tent affiliation); Military (1963–1967)
- Children: 3

Military service
- Allegiance: France; South Vietnam
- Branch/service: French Army; Vietnamese National Army; Army of the Republic of Vietnam
- Years of service: 1940–1965
- Rank: Lieutenant general

Trần Văn Đôn (Vietnamese pronunciation: [t͡ɕən˨˩ van˧˧ ʔɗon˧˧]; August 17, 1917 – 1998) was a general in the Army of the Republic of Vietnam, and one of the principal figures in the 1963 South Vietnamese coup d'état which overthrew President Ngô Đình Diệm.

== Personal life ==
Đôn was born in Bordeaux, France. His father was the son of a wealthy Mekong Delta landowner, which allowed him to travel to France to study medicine. It was during this period that Đôn was born. He returned to France as an adult for his university study. He became a French Army officer when World War II began, later training at École spéciale militaire de Saint-Cyr. Đôn died in 1997.

== Military ==
He returned to Vietnam and served in the French-backed Vietnamese National Army of the French-backed State of Vietnam, fighting against the Việt Minh in the First Indochina War. Đôn was a colonel in 1955, when he and then fellow colonel Dương Văn Minh helped Ngô Đình Diệm establish himself in control of South Vietnam following the Geneva Accords and partition by helping to subdue the private armies of the Hòa Hảo and Cao Đài religious sects, as well as the Bình Xuyên organized crime syndicate. Both were immediately promoted to the rank of general. With the proclamation of the Republic of Vietnam, military officers were faced with becoming Vietnamese citizens if they wanted to remain in their positions. Đôn became a Vietnamese citizen.

Đôn became Diệm's chief of staff and presided over a ceremony in Saigon in which the French-style military rank insignias were burnt and replaced with American-inspired new insignias. In the early 1960s, he commanded I Corps of the Army of the Republic of Vietnam (ARVN), which operated in the far north of South Vietnam, in the border region along the demilitarised zone. He led his forces into the mountainous areas of the Central Highlands to flush out pockets of Viet Cong resistance and to prevent further infiltration from North Vietnam. In all, his command took in five provinces. He often came into dispute with Diệm's brother, Ngô Đình Cẩn, who had his own autonomous private army and secret police and ruled the northern border regions of South Vietnam arbitrarily. Đôn was removed from command of troops and made the chief of the Joint General Staff (JGS), where he was confined to an office with no troops. His work was mainly travelling to the airport to greet visiting American dignitaries. Diệm feared that the respect that Đôn commanded could make him a possible rival for power, as the army leadership was selected for the purpose of preserving Diệm in power, rather than defeating the communists.

Đôn, then chief of the JGS, organised discontented officers, and in mid-1963 began meeting with Lucien Conein, a French-born CIA officer in Saigon with whom he culturally related. His closest confidant was his brother-in-law, General Lê Văn Kim, who was also trained in France.

At the time, South Vietnam was gripped by widespread civil unrest due to Diem's suppression of the Buddhist majority, which responded with mass protests. In August, Don led a group of seven generals to meet Diem and present a request for martial law to disband the groups of monks and their supporters from the temples in Saigon. Also present was Đôn's brother-in-law Lê Văn Kim, head of the military academy. Đôn claimed communists had infiltrated the monks at Xá Lợi and warned that ARVN morale was deteriorating because of the civil unrest and consequent disruption of the war effort. He claimed it was possible that the Buddhists could assemble a crowd to march on Gia Long Palace. Hearing this, Diệm agreed to declare martial law effective on the next day, without consulting his cabinet, and troops were ordered into Saigon to occupy strategic points. Don was appointed as the acting Chief of the Armed Forces in place of General Lê Văn Tỵ, who was terminally ill with cancer and receiving medical treatment abroad. Đôn claimed Diệm was concerned for the welfare of the monks, allegedly telling the generals that he did not want any of them hurt. The martial law orders were then signed and authorized by Đôn. The real purpose of Đôn asking for martial law was to maneuver troops in readiness for a coup, and he had no concrete plans to send the regular army into the pagodas. Nhu sidestepped him and took the opportunity to discredit the army by using Tung's Special Forces and the combat police to attack the pagodas.

After the raids occurred, Đôn privately met with Conein and reiterated that the Americans were mistaken in believing that the ARVN was responsible. Đôn insisted that Diem remained in control although Nhu had to approve all of the generals' meetings with Diệm. Đôn insisted Nhu had orchestrated the raids, fearing that the generals had too much power. He asserted that Nhu used the cover of martial law to discredit the generals by dressing the Special Forces in ARVN uniforms. Đôn insisted that he was unaware of the plans and was at Joint General Staff headquarters when he was informed of the assaults.

After the pagoda raids, Đôn was sought out by Do Mau, who wanted to collaborate.

In the wake of the raids, Đôn attempted to win over General Tôn Thất Đính, the commander of the forces which surrounded Saigon, so that he could encircle Diệm. Đính, who was regarded as being vain, was reveling after having taken credit for the Pagoda raids, even though they were performed by the Special Forces of Colonel Lê Quang Tung. Đôn organised for a national inspection tour with Đính, and played to his ego. Đôn organised many parties for Đính, and told him that he was a national hero worthy of political authority. He even bribed Đính's soothsayer to predict his elevation to political authority. After Đính asked Diệm for the interior ministry post in front of his colleagues and was rebuked and sent off duty in front of his colleagues, Đính changed sides. Đôn and Đính then signed orders transferring the forces based around Mỹ Tho, 60 kilometres south of Saigon from General Huỳnh Văn Cao, a Diệm loyalist, to General Nguyễn Hữu Có. This gave the plotters complete encirclement of Saigon.

=== Coup ===
At 10:00 on 1 November, US Ambassador Henry Cabot Lodge Jr., General Paul Harkins and Admiral Harry D. Felt, the commander of US forces in the Pacific region, were invited to Gia Long Palace by Diệm. Đôn had scheduled the meeting for the visiting Felt at that time to keep Diệm occupied as the troops were moved in and to keep the president in Saigon. They were accompanied by Đôn. Diệm gave one of his chain-smoking monologues and said that he would cooperate with US recommendations.

Before leaving Saigon, Felt held a press conference with Harkins and Đôn while the rebels were rolling into the city. Thinking of the situation, Đôn kept glancing at his watch while waiting for Felt to fly out. The three men were standing as they talked, and Đôn, overcome by nerves, chewed his gum "like a threshing machine", and could not stand still, frequently changing his footing as he talked. After Felt left, the runway was closed, and Đôn brushed off Harkins and quickly went away to get ready for the coup. Up to the last minute, Harkins and Felt remained unaware of the imminent coup, despite Đôn's fidgety behaviour. The pair had paid a visit to Đôn to discuss military issues at 09:15, but instead of the Vietnamese general hosting his American visitors at JGS headquarters, as was the norm, Đôn went to the Military Assistance Command, Vietnam office. Although Felt was surprised, the Americans did not realise the reason for the unusual venue and then pointed at a map and wondered why two airborne battalions appeared to be idling. Đôn replied that they were going into battle, and Harkins nodded, unaware that they were entering Saigon. Harkins had told the generals earlier that he opposed a coup, so Đôn avoided the topic. Felt had been told of the existence of coup plans by Lodge, who falsely informed him that it was not imminent, saying "There isn't a Vietnamese general with hair enough on his chest to make it go." Felt later said that Đôn appeared to be calm and composed.

At 13:00, the plotters summoned many senior officers who were not involved in the plot to the JGS headquarters at Tân Sơn Nhứt Air Base, on the pretext of a routine lunchtime leadership meeting. Mậu and Đôn organised the invitations and set up the trap. At 13:45, Đôn announced that a coup was taking place, and those who remained loyal to the regime were arrested.

Shortly after 16:00, Diệm telephoned JGS headquarters. Đôn answered and stated "the time has come when the army must respond to the wishes of the people" because Diệm had failed to reform his leadership. The pair had a robust argument and Diệm asked the commanders to visit him at the palace to negotiate and work on a reform plan. The generals, remembering that he bought time for loyalists to come to his aid during the 1960 coup attempt by stalling the coup with talks and a false promise of reform and power-sharing, turned down his suggestion.

After the coup proved successful, Đôn promised Diệm safe passage from the country, and asked Conein to secure an American aircraft to take the brothers out of the country. However, Major Nguyễn Văn Nhung, Minh's bodyguard and one of the arresting officers, shot Diệm and Nhu. Đôn maintained that the generals were "truly grievous" over the deaths, maintaining that they were sincere in their intentions to give Diệm a safe exile. Đôn charged Nhu with convincing Diệm to reject the offer, and blamed Minh for the executions, saying "I can state without equivocation that this was done by General Dương Văn Minh and by him alone."

== Junta ==
Đôn then served in the Military Revolutionary Council that resulted from the coup as Defense Minister. A civilian government and cabinet led by Prime Minister Nguyễn Ngọc Thơ was appointed by the MRC to ease some of the workload on non-military matters. However, the presence of Đôn and Đính in both the civilian cabinet and the MRC paralyzed the governance process. Đính and Đôn were subordinate to Thơ in the cabinet, but as members of the MRC they were superior to him. Whenever Thơ gave an order in the civilian hierarchy with which they disagreed, they would go into the MRC and give a counter-order.

During this time, Minh, Don and Tho wanted to coax back non-communist dissidents and isolate those that were communists. They later said that they believed the Americans had become aware of this and grown hostile to them. At the same time, in accordance with the political strategy, the MRC was reluctant to carry out large-scale offensives, which concerned the Americans, who wanted large-scale bombing of North Vietnam.

=== Overthrow ===
A group of officers, led by Generals Nguyen Khanh, Tran Thien Khiem and Do Mau were unhappy with their posts after the 1963 coup, and began plotting. Incriminating documents were concocted to purportedly show that Generals Minh, Kim and Đôn had been bought by French agents and were on the brink of declaring South Vietnam's neutrality and signing a peace deal to end the war with the North. Some of the documents were leaked to elements of the American presence in Saigon and were brought to the attention of some senior American officials. Khánh told various American officials that Đôn, Kim and General Mai Hữu Xuân, along with Minh, were "pro-French and pro-neutralist" and part of French President Charles de Gaulle's plan to neutralise Vietnam. Khánh claimed that the fact that Đôn had invited two members of the French National Assembly—both from de Gaulle's party—to dinner. According to one source, Kim and Minh were also present, while another said that Kim, Đính and Xuân were there. Khánh alleged at the time that the generals discussed neutralization there, while Đôn and Đính always denied it. Another incident that occurred publicly was a January trip by Đôn and Đính to Thailand's capital Bangkok for a military event was a press conference at which Đôn did not rule out de Gaulle's plan if it applied to both Vietnams equally. Lodge passed a report to Washington on January 20, alleging that Đôn and Đính were potential leaders of a group that might go along with de Gaulle's neutralization plan. He said that Đôn and Kim retained their French citizenship and "had never at any time foresworn the possibility of a neutral solution at what might seem to them the proper time." He said that although he thought their policies against the communists were effective, "none of us had ever discussed what the next step would be after the Government of Vietnam had reached a position of strength. Perhaps they did favor the French neutrality solution at that time."

On January 30, Khánh launched a coup, arresting Minh, Dinh, Đôn and Kim, claiming that they were part of a neutralist plot with the Vietcong and taken to Đà Lạt. Khánh noted that they had served in the Vietnamese National Army in the early 1950s, under the French colonial administration, although he did as well. The day after coming to power, Khánh further claimed to Lodge that Đôn was in possession of briefing papers from the Americans on plans for the bombing of North Vietnam and said that they were in danger of being handed over to the communists.

On May 28, 1964, Khanh put his rivals on trial. The generals were secretly interrogated for five and a half hours, mostly about details of their coup against Diệm, rather than the original charge of promoting neutralism. As all of the officers were involved in the plot against Diệm, this did not reveal any information new to them. The court deliberated for over nine hours, and when it reconvened for the verdict on May 29, Khánh stated, "We ask that once you begin to serve again in the army, you do not take revenge on anybody". The tribunal then "congratulated" the generals, but found that they were of "lax morality" and unqualified to command due to a "lack of a clear political concept". They were chastised for being "inadequately aware of their heavy responsibility" and of letting "their subordinates take advantage of their positions". The four imprisoned generals were allowed to remain in Da Lat under surveillance with their families. However, there were reports that the trial ended in a festive manner akin to a party, as the officers shook hands and made up with one another, with Minh reported to have commended Khanh for his "fairness" before organising a celebratory dinner for the generals. All four generals were barred from commanding troops for a period; Kim was banned for six years, and Đôn 18 months. Offices were prepared for the quartet so that they could participate in "research and planning". Worried that the group of idle officers would plot against him, Khánh made some preliminary arrangements to send them to the United States for military study, but this fell through. When Khánh was himself deposed in 1965, he handed over dossiers proving that the four generals were innocent; the original documents that Khánh claimed proved his accusations of neutralism were neither presented to nor found by anyone.

=== Brief restoration ===
In September, Khanh survived a coup attempt by Generals Duong Van Duc and Lam Van Phat after the intervention of the 'Young Turks' faction of Nguyen Chanh Thi and Air Force chief Nguyen Cao Ky. To try and counter-act the increasing power of the latter, on November 14, Khánh brought back Don as the deputy chief of staff. However, the Young Turks were cognizant of Khánh's motives, and continued to pressure him to sideline Don and Dinh in an attempt to gain more power for themselves. The Young Turks then decided to try and sideline Don and the Da Lat generals by introducing a policy to forcibly retire officers with more than 25 years of service, as they thought them to be lethargic and ineffective, but most importantly, rivals for power. However, a civilian advisory body named the High National Council, composed mostly of old men, disagreed with this policy, and after refusing to approve it, the Young Turks launched a coup in December 1964 to remove the HNC.

In February 1965, Don was again in view as Phat and Colonel Pham Ngoc Thao made another attempt to overthrow Khanh with the support of Catholic elements aligned with the Dai Viet Quoc Dan Dang and Diemist sympathisers. American intelligence analysts thought Đôn was involved in the coup, but altered their assessment when he stayed in Da Lat instead of heading for the capital. Eight months after the coup was over, Đôn told the American historian George McTurnan Kahin that he had been plotting with Thảo, who had planned for him to become Defense Minister and Chief of Staff of the military, but said the Dai Viet had insisted on installing the Catholic Khiêm. A month earlier, American intelligence analysts thought Thảo was planning to replace Khánh as commander-in-chief with Don.

== Political service ==
In 1965, Đôn retired and was elected to the Senate in 1967 after topping the elections.

In early April 1975 he was appointed as defense minister in the Nguyễn Bá Cẩn cabinet. In this role he attempted to persuade military leaders to stabilise the situation to buy time for an acceptable political settlement.

Đôn was evacuated from Saigon one day before the fall of Saigon.

In a postwar interview with the RAND Corporation discussing the reasons for the fall of South Vietnam, Đôn stated:

We needed the minds of the people because the problem in Vietnam was not only military but also social, economic and political. When I say "political" I don't mean political party, I mean "people." We needed to have a people's army as we have seen in Israel. [But] we could not ask the people to be involved and to support the struggle, if in this fight we did not change the social order. We [needed] a new social order because what we had was the social order we got from the French side. And it was not a real new social order made by the Vietnamese themselves. The other side, when they opened the war against the South, their motivation was independence and unity and a new social order. We must give the same motivation for the people if you want them to follow you. Independence yes; unity yes; but also a new social order and we failed to do it.

== Awards and decorations ==
=== National Honours ===
- Commander of the National Order of Vietnam
- Gallantry Cross with palm

=== Foreign Honours ===
- France :
  - Officer of the Legion of Honour
  - Croix de Guerre
- Thailand :
  - Commander of the Order of the White Elephant (1965)
