= Dương Văn Đức =

South Vietnamese military commander

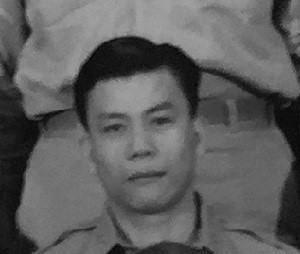

South Vietnamese Minister to South Korea
- In office 16 June 1956 – 10 July 1957
- Preceded by: Diplomatic relations established
- Succeeded by: Nguyễn Quí Anh (as Chargé d'affaires)

Personal details
- Born: 1927 Thủ Đức, French Indochina
- Died: 2000 (aged 72–73)

Military service
- Allegiance: State of Vietnam; South Vietnam
- Branch/service: Vietnamese National Army; Army of the Republic of Vietnam
- Years of service: 19??–1965
- Rank: Lt. General (Trung Tướng)
- Commands: Airborne Brigade (1956); IV Corps (February–September 1964)
- Battles/wars: January 1964 South Vietnamese coup September 1964 South Vietnamese coup attempt

Lieutenant General Dương Văn Đức (Vietnamese pronunciation: [zɨəŋ˧˧ van˧˧ ʔɗɨk̚˧˦]; 1927–2000) was a Vietnamese army officer. He is best known for leading a coup attempt against General Nguyễn Khánh on 14 September 1964. He was a supporter of the Đại Việt Quốc Dân Đảng (DVQDD, Nationalist Party of Greater Vietnam), a Roman Catholic political movement.

Đức joined the French-backed Vietnamese National Army, which became the Army of the Republic of Vietnam (ARVN) after the Republic of Vietnam (South Vietnam) was established. After becoming a major general in 1956 and commanding the Airborne Brigade, Đức served for a year as ambassador to South Korea. Later, he had problems with President Ngô Đình Diệm and went into exile in France, before returning after the arrest and assassination of Diệm after a November 1963 coup.

Duc was an assistant to Lê Văn Kim, one of generals in the ruling junta, but was recruited into a coup plot by Generals Khánh, Trần Thiện Khiêm and Đỗ Mậu. At the time, France was advocating for South Vietnam to become neutral, and the withdrawal of the United States. Đức used his experience of France to draft fake documents purporting to show the junta of Dương Văn Minh wanting to go along with the French proposal. These were then presented to the Americans to ensure support, and Khánh toppled Minh in January 1964 without a fight.

Đức was rewarded with command of IV Corps, which oversaw the Mekong Delta region, before being relieved in September, along with the commander of III Corps and Interior Minister Lâm Văn Phát. This prompted the pair to launch a coup against Khánh on 13 September. They initially took over the capital without a fight, but Khánh escaped, and after receiving endorsements from the U.S., defeated the plotters. At the military trial that followed, charges were dropped.

== Early military career ==
Đức was a member of the Vietnamese National Army of the French-backed State of Vietnam, which fought against the Democratic Republic of Vietnam, which was run by the communist Viet Minh of Hồ Chí Minh. In 1955, during the transition period after the partition of Vietnam, Đức was a VNA colonel and fought in operations against the Hòa Hảo warlord Ba Cụt, who was trying to wrest power from Prime Minister Ngô Đình Diệm. After Ba Cụt was driven from the Mekong Delta, he fled to the Thất Sơn mountains near the border with Cambodia. There, Đức commanded an operation that attempt to capture Ba Cụt in 1955. He claimed to the media that he would capture Ba Cụt within ten days he was unable to do so. Ba Cụt was finally captured in April 1956 and executed several months later. By the end of that year, Diệm had proclaimed himself the president of the newly formed Republic of Vietnam, and the VNA became the Army of the Republic of Vietnam.

Đức was promoted to major general in 1956 and served as an officer in the Airborne Brigade. He was sent abroad to act as the minister to South Korea from 1956 to 1957. Đức was regarded as an effective but idiosyncratic officer. During the later years of Diệm's rule, Đức was in exile in France. The arrest and assassination of Diệm after a November 1963 coup allowed Đức a chance to return to Vietnam.

== 1964 coup with Nguyễn Khánh ==
He returned from exile in Paris, where he had been working as a waiter, and became an assistant to General Lê Văn Kim, the chief of the junta's general staff. At the time, there was a coup plot against the ruling junta of General Dương Văn Minh, and Đức was recruited by a group including Khánh, Đỗ Mậu and Trần Thiện Khiêm.

At the time, the French President Charles de Gaulle wanted Vietnam to become a neutralist country, with the Americans out of the region. This was controversial among the anti-communist South Vietnamese and the plotters wanted to milk the furore by implicating their junta enemies. Đức had years of experience in France, which had given him a good feel of what the French might be up to and what their relations with Francophile members of the ARVN were. He used this to concoct some plausible sounding and incriminating documents for Mậu. They purported to show that three prominent members of the junta: Generals Minh, Kim and Trần Văn Đôn had been bought by French agents and were on the brink of declaring South Vietnam's neutrality and sign a peace deal to end the war with the North. Some of the documents were leaked to some senior U.S. officials.

On the night of 29 January 1964, Mậu and Khiêm alerted their troops to assume their positions around Saigon. At 15:00 the next day, Khánh took over the Joint General Staff Headquarters and seized power in a bloodless coup, having caught the junta off guard. Khánh rewarded Đức by giving him an important command. Duc served as the commander of IV Corps, which oversaw the Mekong Delta region of the country, from 4 March until 15 September 1964, when he was replaced by Major General Nguyễn Văn Thiệu.

== Attempted coup against Nguyễn Khánh (September 1964) ==
The removal was due to Buddhist lobbying, who accused Khánh of accommodating too many Catholics regarded as Diệm supporters in leadership positions. This come after Khánh made an attempt to augment his power in August by ordering a state of emergency and introducing a new constitution, which resulted in mass unrest and calls for civilian rule, forcing Khánh to make concessions in an attempt to dampen discontent. Meanwhile, General Lâm Văn Phát was dismissed as Interior Minister. Disgruntled, the two launched a coup attempt before dawn on 13 September, using ten army battalions that they had recruited, as well as tanks. The coup was supported by Catholic and Đại Việt Quốc Dân Đảng elements. Another member of the conspiracy was Colonel Phạm Ngọc Thảo, who, while ostensibly a Catholic, was actually a communist spy trying to maximize infighting whenever possible. General Khiêm, a member of the ruling triumvirate along with Khánh and Minh, but a rival of the dominant Khánh, was also believed to have supported the plot.

They hoped to overthrow Khánh before their scheduled removal from command took effect. Four battalions of rebel troops moved before dawn from the Mekong Delta towards Saigon, with armored personnel carriers and jeeps carrying machine guns. After cowing several police checkpoints on the edge of the capital with threats of machine-gun and artillery fire, the plotters put rebel sentries in their place to seal off the capital from incoming or outgoing traffic. They then captured communication facilities in the capital including the post office to prevent messages from being sent in or out. Appearing on national radio, and claiming to represent "The Council for the Liberation of the Nation", Phát proclaimed the deposal of Khánh's junta, and accused Khánh of promoting conflict within the nation's military and political leadership. He further promised to capture Khánh and pursue a policy of increased anti-communism, stronger government and military. Phat said that he would use the ideology and legacy of Diệm to lay the foundation for his new junta. There was little reaction from most of the military commanders.

According to historian George McTurnan Kahin, Phát's broadcast was "triumphant" and may have prompted senior officers who were neither part of the original conspiracy nor fully loyal to Khánh to conclude that Phát and Đức would not embrace them if they rallied to their side. Đức claimed that the coup attempt was prompted by "the transfer to the capital of some neutralist elements, and by some pro-communists in the government". However, Phát and Đức could not apprehend Khánh, who had escaped the capital and flew to the central highlands resort town of Đà Lạt. American officials encouraged Khánh to return to Saigon and reassert his control. The general refused to do so unless the Americans publicly announced their support for him to the nation. They then asked Khánh about his plans for the future, but felt he was directionless. After talking to Phát and Đức, they concluded the same and decided to back the incumbent, publicly releasing a statement through the embassy endorsing Khánh. Khánh also received support from Nguyễn Cao Kỳ, the head of the Republic of Vietnam Air Force, who flew over the city and threatened to bomb the rebels, while Brigadier General Nguyễn Chánh Thi of the 1st Division also supported Khánh.

The announcement helped to deter ARVN officers from joining Lam and Đức, who decided to give up. General William Westmoreland, the commander of American forces in Vietnam, had spoken to Đức and reported to Washington that he "in no uncertain terms ... informed him [Duc] that MACV, the U.S. Mission, and the U.S. Government did not support in any way his move, [and] advised that he get his troops moved out of town [Saigon] immediately. He said that he understood and thanked me. He seemed to be a shaky and insecure young man." Đức mistakenly believed Kỳ and his subordinates would be joining the coup, but later realized he was mistaken.

When he learned he had been tricked into thinking that the plotters had great strength, he soon defected. According to an anonymous source, Phát's hardline Diệmist public statements and radio broadcast comments had caused Đức to reconsider his own participation in the coup. After a further meeting between Phát and Đức and Kỳ, the rebels withdrew as Kỳ put on another show of force.

== Staged media conference and claims of harmony ==
As the coup collapsed, Kỳ and Đức appeared with other senior officers at a news conference where they proclaimed that the South Vietnamese military was united, and announced a resolution by the armed forces, signed by them and seven others claiming a united front against corruption. The officers contended that the events in the capital were misinterpreted by observers, as "there was no coup". Kỳ claimed Khánh was in complete control and that the senior officers involved in the stand-off, including Đức, "agreed to rejoin their units to fight the Communists".

Đức claimed that the leading officers had agreed:

1. To put an end to attempts of the Viet Cong to seize power in South Vietnam
2. To purge all Viet Cong elements and their "puppets" out of Government agencies and the ranks of the administration
3. To build a unified nation without distinction based on religion
4. To have the Government treat its citizens impartially

Đức further commented that the fair treatment of citizens was the only way to defeat the communists. When asked if he now supported Khánh, Đức, "looking ill with weariness, if nothing else", simply nodded in agreement. Kỳ claimed that no further action would be taken against those who were involved with Đức and Phát's activities. However, on 16 September, Khánh had Đức and the other plotters arrested and sent to trial. He removed three of the four corps commanders and six of the nine division commanders for failing to move against Phát and Đức.

=== Trial ===
In mid-October, Đức and Phát were among 20 put on trial in a military court. Đức told the assembled media that the trial was unfair, stating "I believe in the supreme court of conscience". He then pointed to his subordinate officers and called them "national heroes". Đức denied media speculation he had backed down during the coup to avoid being bombed by Kỳ, claiming "I wanted to avoid bloodshed ... I am very proud of my decision". Phát's lawyers started by moving for the charges against the conspirators to be dismissed, claiming the rebels had not been captured "red-handed"; this motion was denied. The accused officers claimed they had only intended to make a show of force, rather than overthrow Khánh. Đức claimed that the objective of his actions was to "emphasize my ideas" and said that his actions did not constitute a coup attempt. Đức claimed that if he was truly intending to overthrow the government, he would have arrested public servants or military officials and denied that he had done so. However, he admitted to being concerned by Khánh's policies. Đức claimed he had decided to end what he regarded as a military protest demonstration when Khánh promised to consider his concerns, and then returned to the IV Corps headquarters in the Mekong Delta. Đức claimed responsibility for the actions of his subordinate and co-accused, Colonel Huỳnh Văn Tôn, who led the 7th Division of IV Corps into Saigon in support of the action. Tớn confirmed that Đức had ordered him to move his troops into the capital. During questioning, Đức made no reference to Phát.

One week later on 24 October, the charges were dropped. Khánh then gave Đức and Phát two months of detention for indiscipline; their subordinates were given shorter periods of detention. According to Kahin, Khánh rigged the military trial so that Đức and Phát were acquitted so they could be used as a Catholic counterweight to the Young Turks faction of Kỳ and Thi, who, in Khánh's eyes, had become increasingly strong and threatening.

After this, Đức left the military. In January 1966, he was arrested along with between 10–50 officers, mostly junior officers of the rank of captain, who were suspected of making plans to overthrow Kỳ's junta. Most observers thought the suspicions against the arrested men were not credible, and Đức was released after 24 hours and given an informal warning to avoid political activities. Kỳ made a speech denouncing the alleged coup plot without naming individuals the military was placed on a higher level of alert.
