= Huỳnh Văn Cao =

South Vietnamese military officer (1927–2013)

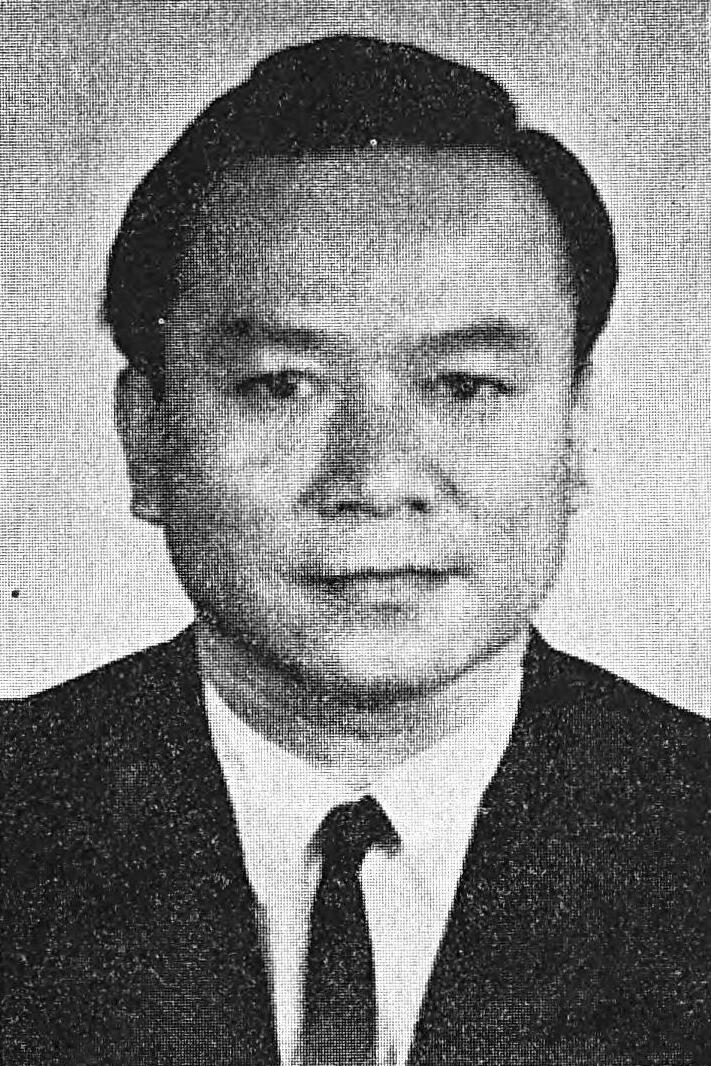
- Born: September 26, 1927; Huế, Annam, French Indochina
- Died: 26 February 2013 (aged 85) Virginia, U.S.
- Allegiance: South Vietnam
- Branch: French Army; Vietnamese National Army; Army of the Republic of Vietnam
- Service years: 1949–1966
- Rank: Major General (Thiếu Tướng)
- Commands: 7th Division; IV Corps
- Conflicts: Battle of Ap Bac; Easter Offensive; Hồ Chí Minh Campaign

Huỳnh Văn Cao (26 September 1927 – 26 February 2013) was a Major general in the South Vietnamese Army of the Republic of Vietnam (ARVN).

== Life ==
In 1950, he graduated from Military school in Huế. He then attended College of Tactics and graduated in Hanoi in 1952. He went to the United States and attended Command and General Staff College and he graduated in 1958.

He was the commander of the Army of the Republic of Vietnam (ARVN) 7th Division. He worked with Lieutenant Colonel John Paul Vann, most notably during the Battle of Ap Bac.

In 1965 he was appointed as commander of the General Political Warfare Department which had been established in 1964 under the guidance of a Nationalist Chinese advisory team invited to South Vietnam several years earlier by President Ngo Dinh Diem. Cao, a onetime favorite of Diem, had survived the political turmoil of 1964 and 1965 through his various political connections, but neither Americans nor Vietnamese thought highly of his abilities, and he may have served only as a figurehead in his new assignment.

On 16 May 1966 during the Buddhist Uprising he was appointed as commander of I Corps replacing General Tôn Thất Đính who had defected to the Struggle Movement. III Marine Amphibious Force commander General Lew Walt met with Cao and was unimpressed. In talks with both Walt and Special Assistant to the COMUSMACV General John F. Freund, Cao revealed that he had no interest in commanding the corps and that other Directory members had coerced him into taking the assignment. On 17 May Cao flew in a U.S. Marine Corps helicopter to Huế to confer with dissident Generals Nguyễn Chánh Thi and Phan Xuân Nhuận. Accompanying him were Walt's chief of staff, Brigadier general Jonas M. Platt and the I Corps deputy senior adviser, Colonel Archelaus L. Hamblen, Jr. After Thi and Nhuan declined to see him, Cao returned to the helicopter and prepared to depart when about a hundred students and soldiers rushed the helicopter pad. Cao scrambled aboard, but as the aircraft began to rise, a South Vietnamese lieutenant began firing at it with a .45-caliber pistol. Returning the fire, the American helicopters door gunner killed the lieutenant and wounded several other South Vietnamese soldiers. Although the local province chief later claimed that the incident was an attempt to assassinate Cao led by a nephew of Tri Quang, the 1st Division's headquarters company commander, Quang denied the allegation and blamed the American gunner for starting the incident. Badly frightened, Cao went on to General Hoàng Xuân Lãm's 2nd Division headquarters at Quảng Ngãi, where the reception was more cordial. Hardly had Cao returned to Da Nang when he encountered more trouble in the person of Colonel Nguyễn Ngọc Loan, chief of the National Police. Loan insisted that Cao order an immediate attack on the pagodas in Da Nang and apparently threatened Cao with bodily harm if he refused. Sometime during an ensuing argument, Hamblen arrived unannounced to find Cao surrounded by Loan and several of his armed police. Terrified, Cao departed with Hamblen and subsequently begged Walt for asylum. Writing to Westmoreland shortly thereafter, Cao asked to be flown to the United States and volunteered to join the U.S. Marine Corps and fight communism "anywhere in the world." He later explained that had he ordered attacks on the pagodas, the Buddhists might have taken reprisals against his Roman Catholic parents, who resided in Hue, and other Catholics. Although first Vien, then Co, flew to Da Nang to try to calm Cao, neither was able to coax him out of the U.S. Marine Corps compound. Cao was then replaced as I Corps commander by General Trần Thanh Phong. On 9 July 1966 a special military tribunal dismissed Cao, Đính, Thi and Nhuận from the ARVN.

He served as Senate First Vice President in the government of South Vietnam.

In 1971 he stated "President Nixon can support President Thiệu, but President Nixon cannot force the Vietnamese people to support President Thiệu."

After the Fall of Saigon, he was left behind in South Vietnam and imprisoned until 1987. He came to the United States in 1990. He was a contributing writer for the Vietnam Magazine and the author of Vietnam: Today & Tomorrow.

== Personal life ==
He was married and had ten children and more than 19 grandchildren.

== Key dates ==
=== Military positions ===
- Platoon Leader, 1950–51
- Company commander, 1951–52
- Battalion commander, 1953–54
- Chief of the Special Staff, Presidency 1955-57
- Commander, 13th Infantry Division, 1957–58
- Commander, 7th Infantry Division and Tien Giang Tactical Zone, 1959–62
- Chief negotiator, Vietnamese Delegation to Meeting with Cambodian Delegation on Vietnam-Cambodia Borders, March 1964
- General commissioner, Popular Complaints and Suggestions Office, 4 May 1964
- Chief, General Political Warfare Department, 1965–66
- Commanding General, I Corps, 16–30 May 1966

=== Political career ===
- Chairman, Social Democrat Bloc, Senate, 1967–1968
- Chairman, foreign Affairs and Information Committee, Senate, 1968
- First Deputy Chairman, Senate, 1970–1971
- Senator, 1971–1975

=== Decorations and awards ===
- Commander of the National Order of Vietnam
- Gallantry Cross with Palm
