= Trần Thiện Khiêm =

Prime Minister of South Vietnam from 1969 to 1975

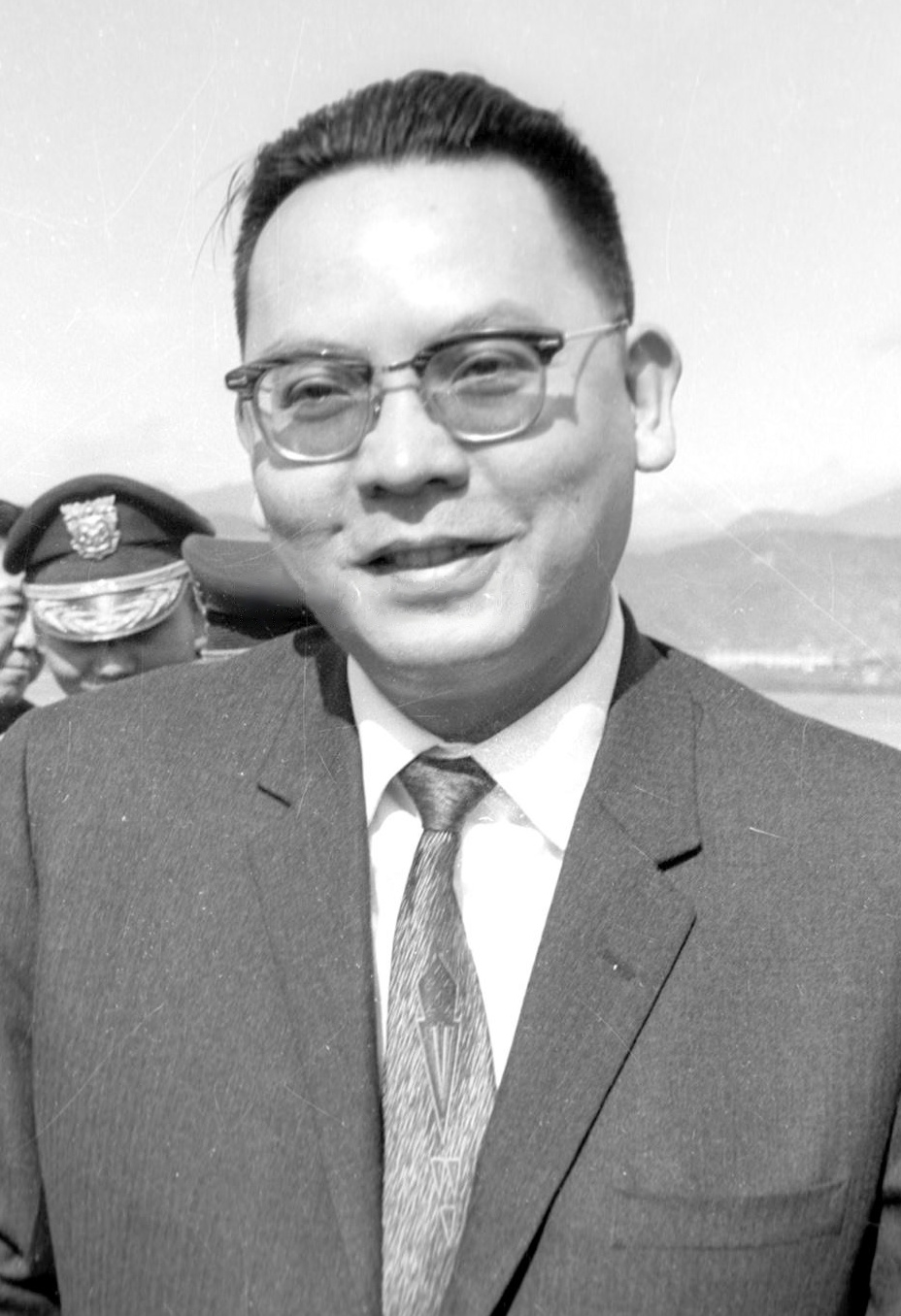
- Khiêm in Taiwan, 1965

8th Prime Minister of South Vietnam
- In office 23 August 1969 – 4 April 1975
- President: Nguyễn Văn Thiệu
- Deputy: Nguyễn Lưu Viên (First Deputy); Phan Quang Đán (Second Deputy; 1974–1975)
- Preceded by: Trần Văn Hương
- Succeeded by: Nguyễn Bá Cẩn

1st Commander-in-chief of Republic of Vietnam Armed Forces
- In office 31 January 1964 – 7 October 1964
- Preceded by: Trần Văn Đôn (as Minister of National Defense)
- Succeeded by: Nguyễn Khánh (as Chairman of Council of Armed Forces)

Minister of National Defense
- In office 6 August 1972 – 14 April 1975
- Prime Minister: Himself; Nguyễn Bá Cẩn
- Preceded by: Nguyễn Văn Vy
- Succeeded by: Trần Văn Đôn
- In office 8 February 1964 – 9 September 1964
- Prime Minister: Nguyễn Khánh; Nguyễn Xuân Oánh (acting); Nguyễn Khánh
- Preceded by: Trần Văn Đôn
- Succeeded by: Nguyễn Khánh

Minister of Internal Affairs of South Vietnam
- In office 27 May 1968 – 29 June 1973
- Prime Minister: Trần Văn Hương; Himself
- Preceded by: Linh Quang Viên
- Succeeded by: Lê Công Chất

Deputy Prime Minister of South Vietnam
- In office 27 May 1968 – 22 August 1969
- Prime Minister: Trần Văn Hương
- Preceded by: Phạm Đăng Lâm
- Succeeded by: Nguyễn Lưu Viên

Personal details
- Born: 15 December 1925 Long An, Cochinchina, French Indochina
- Died: 24 June 2021 (aged 95) Orange County, California, U.S.
- Party: National Social Democratic Front
- Other political affiliations: Military (1963–1967); Cần Lao (until 1963)
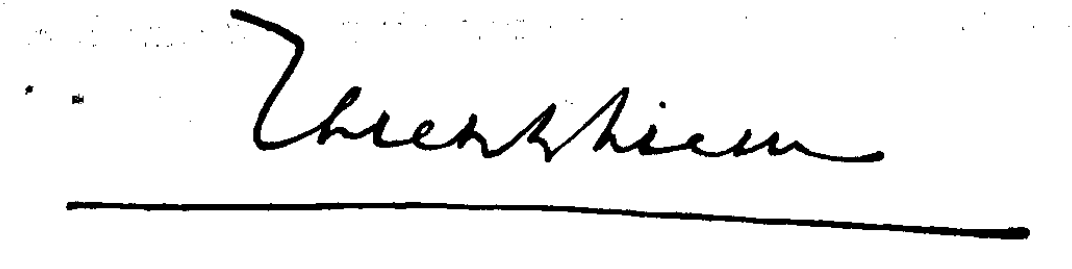
- Signature
- Military career
- Allegiance: Republic of Vietnam
- Branch: State of Vietnam; Army of the Republic of Vietnam
- Service years: 1947–1975
- Rank: General (Đại Tướng)
- Commands: 21st Division (1960–1962); Chief of Staff of the armed forces (1962–1963); III Corps (1964); Chairman of the Joint General Staff (1964)
- Conflicts: 1960 South Vietnamese coup attempt; 1963 South Vietnamese coup; January 1964 South Vietnamese coup; 1965 South Vietnamese coup
- Other work: National Leadership Committee (1964); Ambassador to the United States (1964–1965); Ambassador to South Korea and Taiwan (1965–1968)

Trần Thiện Khiêm (Vietnamese: [ʈəŋ˨˩ tʰiəŋ˨˩˨ kʰim˧˧]; 15 December 1925 – 24 June 2021) was a South Vietnamese soldier and politician, who served as a General in the Army of the Republic of Vietnam (ARVN) during the Vietnam War. He was born in Saigon, Cochinchina, French Indochina (now Vietnam). During the 1960s, he was involved in several coups. He helped President Ngô Đình Diệm put down a November 1960 coup attempt and was rewarded with a promotion. In 1963, however, he was involved in the coup that deposed and assassinated Diêm.

He later joined with Nguyễn Khánh to stage a successful January 1964 coup. In the next few months, the Catholic Khiêm fell out with Khánh whom he accused of being too heavily influenced by Buddhist activists. Khiêm tried to plot against Khánh, but was thwarted. He was implicated in the organization of the September 1964 coup attempt by Generals Lâm Văn Phát and Dương Văn Đức, both Catholics, and was sent into exile to serve as Ambassador to the United States. In February 1965, Colonel Phạm Ngọc Thảo, who had accompanied him to Washington had returned to Saigon and launched a coup with Phát. This was done with Khiêm's support. The coup failed but other officers took the opportunity to force Khánh into exile. Khiêm would return to Vietnam when the political climate among the generals was more favorable and became Prime Minister under President Nguyễn Văn Thiệu, resigning only in the last month before the fall of Saigon.

== Career ==
Khiêm graduated from the Vietnamese National Military Academy in Đà Lạt on 12 July 1947. He became a 1st Lieutenant in June 1948 and served in the Vietnamese National Army of the French-backed State of Vietnam of Emperor Bảo Đại, which fought the Việt Minh of Hồ Chí Minh. Khiêm was appointed captain in 1951 and major in July 1954. In 1957, as a colonel, he became a Deputy Chief of General Staff/Logistics and served as acting Chief of Joint General Staff in October. From 1957 to 1958 he attended the Command and General Staff College at Fort Leavenworth, Kansas in the United States, and upon his return, served as 4th Field Division Commander until February 1960. In September, he switched to command the 5th Division, which at the time was based in Mỹ Tho.

== 1960 defence of Diêm against coup ==
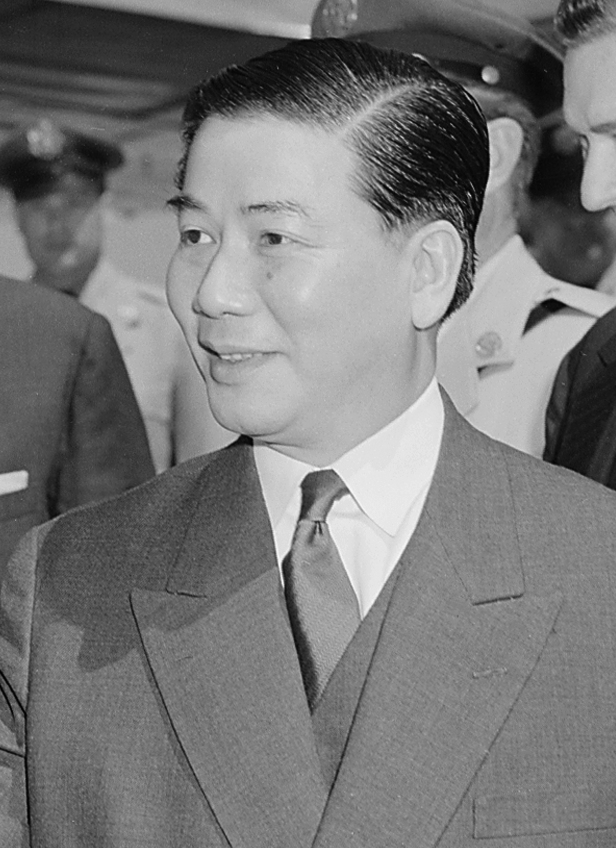
Khiêm was a loyalist of President Diêm.

On 11 November 1960, Colonels Vương Văn Đông and Nguyễn Chánh Thi launched a coup attempt against President Diêm, but after surrounding the palace, they stopped attacking and decided to negotiate a power-sharing agreement. Diêm falsely promised reforms, allowing time for his loyalists to come to the rescue. The rebels had failed to seal the highways into the capital to block loyalist reinforcements.

Khiêm was a Roman Catholic with ties to Diêm's older brother, Archbishop Thục; Diêm was also Khiêm's godfather. Khiêm brought in tanks from the Second Armored Battalion from Mỹ Tho, a town in the Mekong Delta, south of Saigon. As the false promises of reform were being aired, Khiêm's men approached the palace grounds. Some of the rebels switched sides as the power balance changed. After a brief but violent battle that killed around 400 people, the coup attempt was crushed. Khiêm was made a brigadier general after serving as the head of the 21st Division, and was appointed Chief of Staff of the combined armed forces and made a major general in December 1962.

== 1963 coup against Diệm ==
One of Khiêm's subordinates, Phạm Ngọc Thảo, a Communist double agent, was planning one of the many coup plots that engulfed Saigon and destabilised the regime, with the help of Trần Kim Tuyến. Thảo's plans were shelved when an American CIA agent, Lucien Conein, instructed Khiêm, to stop the coup on the grounds that it was premature. Thảo was actually a communist double agent whose involvement in the plotting is generally attributed to cause infighting within the ARVN whenever possible. He later joined the main plot, of which Khiêm was part.

As Diêm was known for his ability to outwit coup plotters, those in the plot did not fully trust each other. On the morning of the coup, an emotional Khiêm approached General Tôn Thất Đính with tears welling in his red eyes and asked him to keep their conversation confidential. After the III Corps commander agreed, Khiêm claimed he wanted to cancel the coup, saying "Đính, I think we still have time to talk to the old man. I don't want to hurt him. Have pity on him!" Đính contemplated the situation and said that he would proceed. Khiêm then reported this to Đôn, and claimed that he had placed Chinese medicinal oil into his eyes to irritate and redden them and thus give the appearance he had become remorseful about the coup, in order to test Đính's loyalty to the plot.

Both Minh and Đôn were still wary of Khiêm and Đính's loyalty up to the last minute, as both were Catholics who were favourites of the Ngô family, who had been rewarded for their loyalty not competence. The other generals were still worried that Đính might switch sides and go through with the second part of Nhu's fake coup, and that Khiêm's alleged test on Đính was simply done to deflect suspicion on him. The generals were also concerned they would not have enough forces to overcome the loyalists. During the coup, Thảo commanded some tanks, which surrounded Gia Long Palace and helped launch the full-scale attack at 03:30 on 2 November. At daybreak Thảo's forces stormed the palace, but found it empty; Diêm and Nhu had escaped. A captured loyalist revealed the brothers' hiding place and under the orders of Khiêm, Thảo went after them. Khiêm ordered Thảo to ensure the brothers were not physically harmed. Thảo arrived at the house in Cholon where the brothers were hiding and brought in a convoy to arrest them. The brothers were subsequently executed en route to military headquarters despite being promised safe exile, apparently on the orders of General Dương Văn Minh. Diêm's aide-de-camp, Lieutenant Đỗ Thơ had earlier urged Diêm to surrender, saying he was sure that his uncle Đỗ Mậu, along with Đính and Khiêm, would guarantee their safety. Thơ wrote in his diary afterwards that "I consider myself responsible for having led them to their death".

== 1964 coup against Minh ==
After the 1963 coup, the key figures took the choice jobs in the Military Revolutionary Council, and Khiêm was demoted from being Chief of Staff of the armed forces to the commander of the III Corps that surrounded Saigon. Khiêm controlled the 5th and 7th Divisions of the ARVN, which were based in Biên Hòa and Mỹ Tho, north and south of Saigon respectively. Khiêm was disgruntled and easily recruited into another coup.

The coup plot was initiated by Brigadier General Đỗ Mậu, who had been the head of military security under Diem and had a thorough knowledge of the backgrounds of most of the senior officers and their strengths and weaknesses. The MRC feared Mậu and placed him in the relatively powerless post of Minister of Information. Mậu began to seek out other slighted officers, including Khiêm, Generals Khánh and Thi, who had returned from exile after Diêm's death.

As the coup plot began to solidify, Khánh came to the fore of the group. It has been concluded by some analysts that Khiêm – who went on to be Khánh's second in command in terms of real power after the coup was successful – was more pre-eminent during the early phases of the planning, but as a Catholic who had been rapidly promoted by Diêm after converting, he "did not dare to carry out a coup d'etat himself out of fear that the Buddhists would react strongly against him and accuse him of trying to reestablish the Ngô Regime". Another factor seen as vital in bringing Khánh to the forefront of the coup group was the fact that the US military leadership deemed Khánh more capable than Khiêm and equally likely to work in accordance with US interests. Khánh was highly regarded by Harkins, who thought of him as "the strongest of all corps commanders". According to a CIA assessment, Khánh had been "consistently favorable to U.S. programs and advice".

Khiêm, Khánh and Mậu kept in touch surreptitiously on a regular basis, supplementing their forces with an assortment of Marine, Air Force and Special Forces officers. They scheduled the coup for 0400, 30 January. According to the plan, Khiêm's III Corps forces would surround the homes of the sleeping junta members in Saigon while Khánh and a paratrooper unit would occupy the military headquarters at Tan Son Nhut Air Base.

On the night of 29 January, Khiêm ordered troops to assume their positions around Saigon, including armored cars and tanks and some elements from the 5th and 7th Divisions. Khiêm then went to sleep. Khánh headed to the staff headquarters, where he saw that the compound was empty apart from a few guards. When he telephoned Khiêm, he found that his co-conspirator had overslept after having forgotten to set his alarm clock. Despite this, by daybreak, Khánh had taken over without a shot being fired. Generals Dương Văn Minh, Trần Văn Đôn and Lê Văn Kim woke up to find Khiêm's men surrounding their houses and thought it to be a quixotic stunt by some disgruntled young officers, having had no inkling of the plot. Khánh put them under house arrest, later charging them with neutralism. In a morning radio broadcast Khánh said he had conducted the coup because of the junta's failure to make progress against the Viet Cong. After the coup, Khiêm became Defense Minister and the Chairman of Joint General Staff while serving on the junta.

== Junta infighting ==
In August 1964, after Khánh decided to take more power for himself by declaring a state of emergency and introducing a new constitution, Buddhists launched protests against the new junta, claiming that there was a plot to revive the Diêm era by predominantly Catholic groups such as Cần Lao veterans and Đại Việt supporters, pinpointing Khiêm and Thiệu, both Catholics who had been favoured by Diêm. Khánh's concessions to the Buddhists sparked opposition from Khiêm and Thiệu, who tried to remove Khánh in favour of Minh, recruiting other officers. Khiêm said "Khánh felt there was no choice but to accept since the influence of [Thích] Trí Quang was so great that he could not only turn the majority of the people against the government but could influence the effectiveness of the armed forces". They sought out Taylor and sought a private endorsement for a coup against Khánh, but the US ambassador did not want any more changes in leadership, fearing a corrosive effect on the government. This deterred Khiêm's group from toppling Khánh.

The division among the generals came to a head at a meeting of the MRC on 26/27 August. Khánh claimed the instability was due to troublemaking by members and supporters of the Catholic-aligned Đại Việt (the Nationalist Party of Greater Vietnam), which he accused of putting partisan plotting ahead of the national interest. Prominent officers associated with the Dai Việt included Thiệu and Khiêm. Khiêm blamed Khánh's concessions to Buddhist activists as the reason for the demonstrations and the rural losses to the communists. Thiệu and another Catholic, General Nguyễn Hữu Có, called for the replacement of Khánh with Minh, but the latter refused. Minh reportedly claimed that Khánh was the only one who would get funding from Washington, so they support him, prompting Khiêm to angrily say "Obviously, Khánh is a puppet of the US government, and we are tired of being told by the Americans how we should run our internal affairs".

After more arguing between the senior officers, they agreed on 27 August that Khánh, Minh, and Khiêm would rule as a triumvirate for two months, until a new civilian government could be formed. The trio then brought paratroopers into Saigon to end the rioting. However, the momentum petered out due to the lack of unity in the ruling triumvirate. Khánh dominated the decision-making, sidelining Khiêm and Minh. Khánh blamed Khiêm for organizing a failed coup attempt led by Generals Lâm Văn Phát and Dương Văn Đức on 13 September. General Huynh Van Cao, a Catholic and former Diệm loyalist, claimed in a 1972 newspaper interview that Khiêm, by then prime minister, had asked him to join the coup. Cao claimed that he declined Khiêm's invitation, mildly mocking him by asking "You're part of the 'Troika' now ... won't you be overthrowing yourself?", and pointing out that a political upheaval in Saigon would be a bad idea because Vietnam was prominent during the ongoing US presidential election campaign and negative publicity could lead to weakening US public and political support for South Vietnam. Khiêm's lack of public action was seen as tacit support for the coup; A US Embassy log during the coup claimed that the Thiệu and Khiêm "seem so passive that they appear to have been either tacitly supporting or associated with his move by Đức and Phát", and that Khiêm had "issued expressions of firm support for Khánh somewhat belatedly", as control was eventually reestablished.

== Plotting from overseas ==
By the end of the year, Khánh had prevailed in the power struggle with Khiêm and Minh. He despatched Khiêm to Washington as ambassador, being convinced Khiêm was destabilizing Saigon. In late December 1964, Khánh summoned Thảo back to Saigon. Thảo suspected Khánh was attempting to have him killed, while Khánh thought that Thảo and Khiêm were plotting against him. Fearing that he would be arrested upon arrival, Thảo attempted to outmanoeuvre Khánh and went underground to plot. In the meantime, Khiêm had been putting pressure on Khánh while serving as his ambassador by charging he and the Buddhists with seeking a "neutralist solution" and "negotiating with the communists".

In January 1965, the junta-appointed Prime Minister Trần Văn Hương introduced a series of measures to expand the military and war effort by widening the terms of conscription. This provoked widespread anti-Hương demonstrations and riots across the country, mainly from conscription-aged students and pro-negotiations Buddhists. Reliant on Buddhist support, Khánh decided to have the armed forces take over. On 27 January, he removed Hương in a bloodless coup. Khánh's deposal of Hương nullified a counter-plot involving Hương that had developed during the civil disorders. In an attempt to pre-empt his deposal, Hương had backed a plot led by some Đại Việt-oriented Catholic officers, including Thiệu and Nguyễn Hữu Có. They planned to remove Khánh and bring Khiêm back from Washington, D.C. The US Embassy in Saigon was privately supportive of the aim, but not ready to fully back the move as they regarded it as poorly thought out and potentially a political embarrassment due to the need to use an American plane to transport some plotters, including Khiêm, between Saigon and Washington.

By this time the US relationship with Khánh had broken down and the US became more intent on a regime change as Khánh was reliant on Buddhist support, which they saw as an obstacle to an expansion of the war. In the first week of February, Taylor told the leading officers that the US was not supporting Khánh, and they thought that Khiêm was a possible replacement although not among the most preferable. However, the candidates favoured by the Americans fell behind Thảo in their planning.

On 19 February, Thảo and General Lâm Văn Phát began their coup attempt, seizing the military headquarters, the post office and radio station. Thảo made a radio announcement stating that he would remove the "dictator" Khánh, and would recall Khiêm to Saigon to lead the junta. Although Khiêm was part of the plot, the timing of Thảo's announcement caught Khiêm off-guard, asleep in his Maryland home. When informed of what was happening, Khiêm sent a cable pledging "total support" to the plot.

Thảo had planned for Đôn to become Defense Minister and Chief of Staff of the military, but the Dai Việt insisted on installing the Catholic Khiêm. During the announcement of the coup, Phát and others made pro-Diêm speeches and hardline Catholic statements. By this time, Khiêm was preparing to return to Saigon to join in on the action or take over if it became successful. His colleagues had anticipated that the Americans would give them an aircraft so that Khiêm could return to Vietnam, but second thoughts arose among Taylor and Westmoreland. The two American generals had lost confidence in Khánh, but the pro-Diêm political ideology being expressed by Thảo's supporters on radio alienated them, as they feared that the coup plotters would destabilize and polarize the country if they took power. The US wanted Khánh out, but were worried that Phát and Thảo could galvanize support for the beleaguered Khánh through their extremely divisive pro-Diêm views, which had the potential to provoke large-scale sectarian divisions in South Vietnam. The Marine Brigade commander, General Lê Nguyên Khang, appealed to the US Embassy in Saigon to not allow Khiêm to depart the US. As a result of this, Taylor messaged the State Department that "Regardless what ultimate outcome may be we feel Khiêm's arrival here ... would only add tinder to what this evening appears to be very explosive situation with possibilities of internecine strife between armed forces units ... Urge he not try return [to] Saigon until situation more clarified."

After a day of chaos, the coup collapsed when, anti-coup forces swept into the city. Whether the rebels were defeated or a deal was struck to end the revolt in exchange for Khánh's removal is disputed, but most believe the latter as the plotters had met Kỳ beforehand and the collapse was rather orderly. Although the coup failed and Khiêm did not return, the Armed Forces Council adopted a vote of no confidence in Khánh and Nguyễn Cao Kỳ, and Thi became the most powerful figure in the junta. In the meantime, Thảo and Phát were sentenced to death in absentia. Thao was hunted down and killed in mysterious circumstances by other factions with the military leadership, while Phát evaded capture for a few years before surrendering and receiving a pardon from Thiệu.

Despite his failure to take power, Khiêm said he was "very happy. I think my objective has been realized." The new junta decided to ignore Khiêm's involvement in the coup and he remained in Washington as the ambassador, with no further action taken. In October 1965 the junta of Kỳ and Thiệu made Khiêm the Ambassador to Taiwan; he served there until mid-1968, then returned to Vietnam and served under President Thiệu as Interior Minister for a year before becoming Deputy Prime Minister at the start of 1969. In September 1969 he became prime minister and defense minister, and he stayed in the role until April 1975 when he resigned and left the country as the communists were in the process of completing their victory over South Vietnam. However, he had little power as Thiệu operated virtually one-man rule.

Khiem lived in retirement in San Jose, California, and was baptized as a Catholic there in 2018. He died on 23 or 24 June 2021, at the age of 95, while recovering from a fall at a nursing home around Irvine, California.

== Other awards ==
=== National honours ===
- South Vietnam :
  - Grand Cross of the National Order of Vietnam
  - Army Distinguished Service Order, First Class
  - Air Force Distinguished Service Order, First Class
  - Navy Distinguished Service Order, First Class
  - Military Merit Medal
  - Gallantry Cross with seven palms, with one silver star
  - Air Gallantry Cross, Silver wing
  - Hazardous Service Medal
  - Armed Forces Honor Medal, First Class
  - Civil Actions Medal, First Class
  - Good Conduct Medal, Second Class
  - Vietnam Campaign Medal with 1949–54 and 1960– devices
  - Military Service Medal, Second Class
  - Chuong My Medal, First Class

=== Foreign honours ===
- Taiwan :
  - Special Grand Cordon of the Order of Brilliant Star (1970)
- Thailand :
  - Knight Grand Cordon of the Order of the White Elephant

== Notes ==
Political offices
Preceded by Trần Văn Hương	Prime Minister of the Republic of Vietnam; 1969–1975	Succeeded by Nguyễn Bá Cẩn
