= Phạm Văn Đổng =

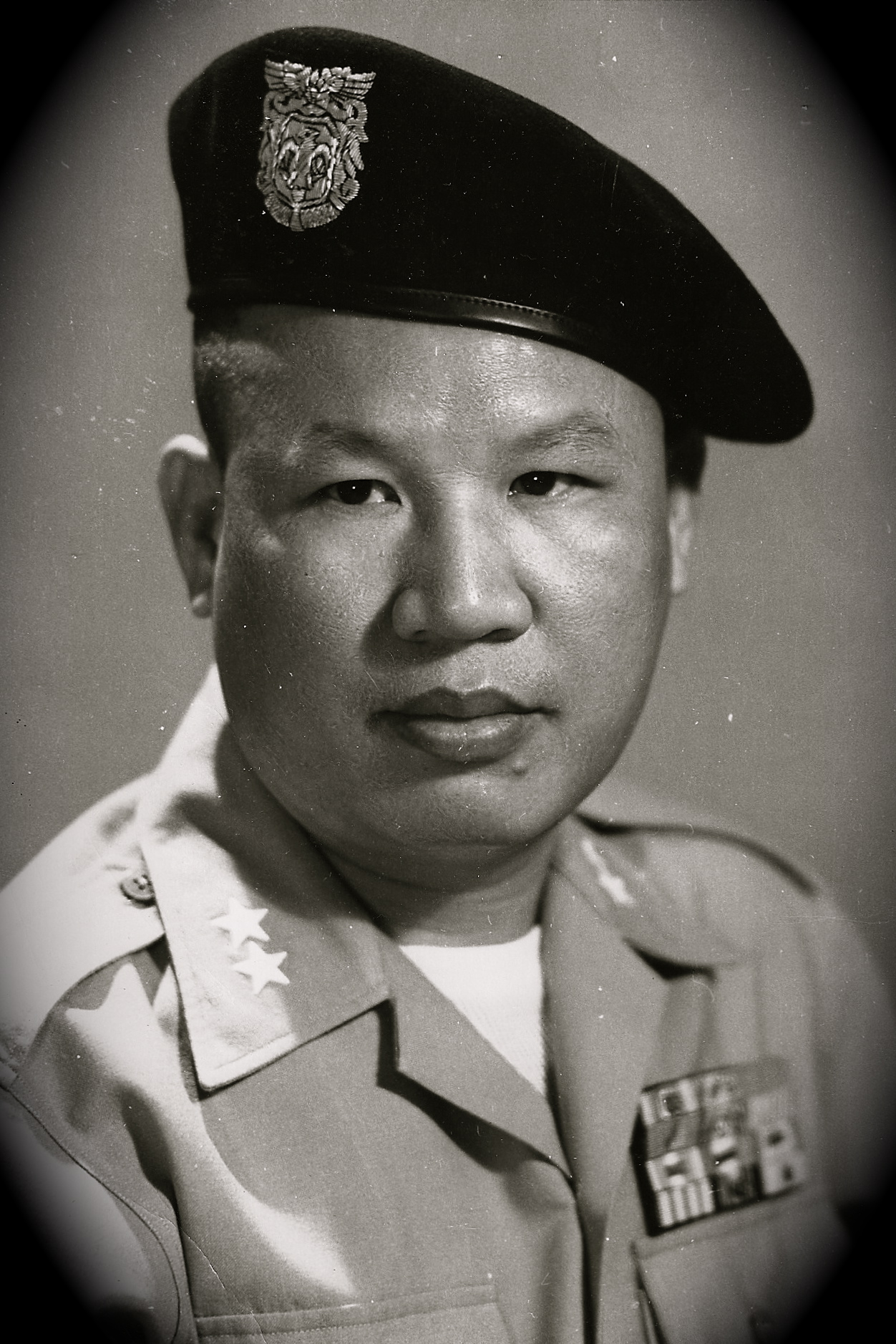
- Official portrait as military governor of Saigon, 1965
- Nickname: Tiger of the Delta
- Born: October 25, 1919; Sơn Tây, Northern Vietnam
- Died: November 26, 2008 (aged 89) Philadelphia, USA
- Buried: Fairfax Memorial Park, Fairfax, Virginia, U.S.
- Allegiance: (South Vietnam) State of Vietnam, Republic of Vietnam
- Branch: AFRVN Infantry, (Lục Quân Quân-lực VNCH)
- Service years: 1939–1967
- Rank: Major General (Thiếu Tướng)
- Commands: Zône Sud, North Vietnam; 55th BVN; 2nd Mobile Group; Bui Chu Secteur; North Vietnam Light Battalions and Artillery Forces; Quang-Yen NCO Academy; Coastal Zone; 3rd Field Division; III Corps – Deputy Commander; 7th Division; Special Capital Military District; Saigon-Giadinh Military Governorship
- Conflicts: World War II; First Indochina War; Vietnam War
- Awards: Order of the Dragon of Annam, Officer; National Order, Commander; Cross of Gallantry, 18 citations
- Other work: Minister of War Veterans (1969–1974)

Phạm Văn Đổng (October 25, 1919 – November 26, 2008) was a South Vietnamese general. A staunch nationalist and anti-communist, he was considered an ally to several Việt Nam Quốc Dân Đảng (Việt Quốc) factions, multiple Đại Việt groups, Việt Nam Cách Mạng Đồng Minh Hội (Việt Cách) high-ranking members, Duy Dân and Hòa Hảo leaders.

== Early life and education ==
Phạm Văn Đổng was born October 25, 1919, in Quốc Oai district, Sơn Tây, Tonkin (now North Vietnam), when Vietnam was still part of French Indochina. He grew up in his father's village of Xuân Đỗ, Gia Lâm district (then part of Bắc Ninh Province) and went to school in Hà Nội where he earned the "Thành Chung" (Diplôme d'Etudes Primaires Superieures Indochinoises (DEPSI)) upon his graduation from Đỗ Hữu Vị School.

Generations of Đổng's family had taught at the Imperial Court. Phạm Văn Đổng himself had planned to become a teacher, so he enrolled at the École Normale d'Instituteurs. In 1939, he had to withdraw, as he did not have the money to bribe a court official, even though he had passed the required examinations. He then joined the French colonial army at the persuasion of his father's friend. It was a good decision as Đồng would later become one of the first Vietnamese officers to command French soldiers at the light division level (Groupement Mobile). Đổng was also one of the few ARVN officers to have been officers in the French Army and the only general officer who had begun his military career as a private.

== Career summary ==
=== World War II ===
Five years after joining the army as an enlisted man, he was promoted to Officer of Materials for the 2nd Battalion of the 19th Colonial Infantry Regiment (Officier du Matériel, II/19e RMIC) stationed in Móng Cái. Here, he earned the trust of young Nùng, many of whom he later trained to be competent officers of the ARVN.

On March 9, 1945, as part of their coup d'état in French Indochina, Imperial Japanese Army forces in Tonkin attacked two battalions of the 19ème RMIC at Hà Cối. Two days later, the regiment commanding officer, Lieutenant Colonel Charles LeCocq, was killed in action while leading a counter-attack. His body would have been left behind were it not for the sharp-shooter Hoang Duc Phung who recovered it with Đổng's mortar support.

Two weeks later, Đổng and remnants of the 1er Territoire Militaire fought their way to Quảng Tây in South China where they joined General Marcel Alessandri who had been cooperating with the Chinese National Kuomintang Army (國民革命軍) in the fight against Japanese armies. There, Đổng attended a special officer class. During this period, he secretly made contacts with several Việt Quốc revolutionaries-in-exile most of whom would become his good friends and ardent supporters throughout his career in South Vietnam. At the end of 1945, Sous Lieutenant Đổng returned to Vietnam where he was assigned to Vạn Hoa.

=== The First Indochina War ===
In 1946, Đổng was transferred to the south where he participated in several major operations in Gò Công, Long Thành, and Thành Tuy Hạ. A year later, his successes against communist troops earned him a promotion to lieutenant. His abilities in organizing intelligence networks eventually landed him a position working for the Governor of North Vietnam, Nghiêm Xuân Thiện as Sous-Directeur des Etudes (Phó Sở Nghiên Cứu) where he reported to Captain Sylvain Trần Văn Minh.

In 1949, Lieutenant Đổng went back to the army as Chief of S-2 for the 2e BVN (Trưởng Phòng 2 của Bộ chỉ huy TĐ2 VN). In 1950, the State of Vietnam's Minister of Defense Phan Huy Quát, a Đại Việt leader, asked Đổng to join the Vietnamese National Army. A year later, after participating in the battle of Vĩnh Yên, he was appointed Commandant of the South Zone based in Nam Định.

Early 1952, Captain Đổng was appointed Commander of the 55th Vietnamese Battalion (55e BVN) stationed at the Nà Sản fire-base. In late November, using 3 battle-hardened divisions (308th, 316th and 320th) General Giap attacked Nà Sản with the intention of defeating the French Union forces to take control of northwest Tonkin. The 55e BVN fought valiantly against the enemy's relentless assaults. To put an end to the "human wave", Đổng ordered his artillery-support to level and to fire howitzers loaded with fragmentation shells directly at the enemy troops. His decision saved the battalion and earned him a promotion to Major.

By the end of the year, he took command of the 2e Groupe Mobile that participated in some of the hardest-fought battles to pacify the Red River Delta, especially in the Ninh Bình area during Operation Hautes Alpes in March 1953. In September 1953, he was appointed Commander of the Bùi Chu Secteur and concurrently Commander of the Forces of North Vietnam Light Battalions and Artillery. The latter position was very important, for he was in command of nineteen light infantry battalions (TĐKQ) and three artillery companies with the mission to pacify a military zone comprising seven provinces.

Prior to taking command of Bùi Chu, Đổng participated in Operation Tarentaise to take back areas under the Việt Minh's control. In October 1953, he commanded Operation Lê Lợi to attack enemy's strongholds in the area. The operation was successful, though the cost was high: one of Đổng light battalions at Quần Phương Hạ was completely destroyed by the Việt Minh's more seasoned independent regiments.

It was in Bùi Chu that Đổng, a Buddhist, would become an ally of Bishop Phạm Ngọc Chi, his diocese and Father Hoàng Quỳnh. In return, these Roman Catholics would become his staunch supporters in both North and South Vietnam.

In mid-1954, he was sent to South Korea to attend a special military training. Coming back to Vietnam shortly after the Geneva Convention that had partitioned the country into two, Đổng as Commander of the Quảng Yên Military Academy redeployed the academy resources and its personnel southward during Operation Passage to Freedom.

=== Vietnam War ===
==== From 1954 to the end of the 1st Republic ====
Đổng had done well as a military man. He had been recognized as a capable tactician by his superiors who continuously promoted him in the first 14 years of his military career. From a humble beginning as a plain soldier in 1939, he had steadily climbed the military ladder to the position of Lieutenant Colonel at the end of the First Indochina War.

After the partition of Vietnam into two countries, Head-of-State Bảo Đại brought his government south where power struggles among different groups would lead to a change in the country's political future. Early 1955, Prime Minister Ngô Đình Diệm consolidated his power over South Vietnam by forcing General Hinh to leave the country then by using the armed forces to defeat the Bình Xuyên, Hòa Hảo and Cao Đài forces. Then, in a rigged referendum on October 23, 1955, Diệm ousted Bảo Đại and founded the Republic. During this time, Đổng was the Coastal Zone Commander (Liên Khu Duyên Hải). After the referendum, Diệm celebrated his rise to power by promoting all senior officers. Even though he supported General Hinh, Đổng was promoted to colonel. He would remain in charge of the coastal zone until October 25, 1956, when President Diệm transferred him to Sông Mao (Bình Thuận) to command the 3rd Field Division, a unit made up entirely of Nùng soldiers. Lieutenant Colonel Đỗ Mậu, Đổng second-in-command who was Diệm's protégé and a Cần Lao party member, was promoted to replace him. Ironically, Mậu later would betray Diệm in 1963.

Colonel Đổng attracted Diệm's attention by refusing to let Cần Lao's cadres conduct political training sessions for his troops. Moreover, he also befriended and sheltered remnants of the Bình Xuyên and Hòa Hảo's defeated forces.

In March 1958, President Diệm seeing that the 3rd Field Division was loyal to none but Colonel Đổng, transferred Nùng soldiers to other units within the Army. In 1959, some of the Nùng soldiers left the army to join Father Nguyễn Lạc Hoá, a good friend of Đổng and a fervent anti-communist priest at the newly formed Sea Swallows enclave in Cà Mau. Đổng, who was self-taught in English, was sent to training at the United States Army Command and General Staff College in Fort Leavenworth, Kansas.

When Đổng returned to Vietnam in 1959, he was appointed Deputy Commander of the III Corps. In this position, he was in charge of conducting campaigns against NVA and Viet Cong units within the Corps's territory. In December 1962, after an American general had advised Diệm to promote Đổng to general and after hearing other American advisers praised the colonel for his commanding skills, the president demoted Đổng to III Corps's Inspector General of Strategic Hamlets.

In August 1963, Buddhist monks caused a political disturbance, commonly known as the Buddhist crisis. This turmoil led to the November 1st coup d'état that toppled Diệm's government. Shortly before the coup, President Diệm had the colonel held at Camp Lê Văn Duyệt out of suspicion that the latter was preparing to launch a coup to topple the government. Đổng was indeed one of the conspirators and his detention shifted the President's suspicion away from other senior officers, primarily General Đôn, head of a CIA-backed and funded group of plotters (CIA liaison officer Lucien Conein gave this group US$42,000). On November 2, General Dương Văn "Big" Minh, a Diệm's protégé, ordered his bodyguard Captain Nguyễn Văn Nhung and Major Dương Hiếu Nghĩa to torture and to kill the brothers Ngô Đình. Most Vietnamese senior officers suspected that general Minh took US Ambassador Lodge's suggestion of eliminating the brothers "to prevent any colonel from bring them back to power".

Several ARVN generals then assumed leadership of South Vietnam. Power struggles, some of which influenced by the monk Trí Quang, would lead to a period of instability in the whole country. Political stability only came in 1967 when Lieutenant General Nguyễn Văn Thiệu and Air Marshal Nguyễn Cao Kỳ were elected leaders of the 2nd Republic.

==== The turbulent years (1964–1967) ====
With the escalation of the Vietnam War and with the increased United States involvement, the role of the ARVN became more significant but was seen by the media in the West as insignificant. After the coup, Colonel Đổng served briefly as 7th Infantry Division Commander, during which time he earned the alias "Tiger of the Delta" for his twelve successful operations against Viet Cong and NVA troops. Late December 1963, he was abruptly relieved command of the division and was sent to Taiwan as military attaché.

Returning from Taiwan in May 1964, he was promoted to brigadier general by General Nguyễn Khánh. Late October 1964, he was promoted to major general. A month later on November 27, he was appointed military governor of Saigon (now Ho Chi Minh City) and concurrently as Special Capital Military District Commander (Tư Lệnh Biệt Khu Thủ đô). During this time, Đổng formed and funded his own armed group made up almost entirely of Nùng soldiers.

Being charged with keeping the capital safe in these troubled times, he had to deal with an enemy in South Vietnam, the Buddhist Struggle Movement led by two monks, Thích Trí Quang of the Ấn Quang group and Thích Tâm Châu of Việt Nam Quốc Tự (VNQT). Both of these monks wanted to topple the government of Vietnam, or at least to render it ineffective. Prime Minister Trần Văn Hương, a Buddhist, took a firm stand against the movement to prevent the country from anarchy. During this turmoil, PM Hương fully supported General Đổng when the latter effectively handled Buddhist protests and street agitations. Arrests were limited but well chosen and almost of detainees were proven to be Communists agents within the Ấn Quang group. At one time, Đổng deployed two battalions to disband a violent and armed mob from VNQT. Tâm Châu stopped his anti-government activities after a meeting with General Nguyễn Khánh, while Trí Quang continued to cause political unrest. Recent declassified CIA documents suggest that the Buddhist movement had been penetrated by Viet Cong agents. Tâm Châu himself published a White Paper in 1993 accusing Trí Quang of being a power-hunger man manipulated by North Vietnam and of harboring Communist agents. A declassified French Sûreté report showed that Trí Quang joined the Indochinese Communist Party in 1949, a fact that former SRV Deputy Prime Minister Tố Hữu proudly confirmed in 2000.

In January 1965, Trí Quang successfully pressured Head-of-State Nguyễn Khánh into dismissing P.M. Hương. A month later, Dr. Quát, a devout Buddhist and former Minister of Defense, was chosen to form a new government. Even without Hương to support his actions, the general did not hesitate in arresting communist agents, many of whom had disguised as monks in the Buddhist movement. His success in preventing Trí Quang from toppling the government led the Armed Forces Council (Hội Đồng Quân Lực) to name the general Uỷ Viên An-Ninh (Security Commissioner) in March, shortly after his friend Nguyễn Khánh was forced to resign and to leave the country.

Infuriated by the AFC's action, Trí Quang manipulated Quát, Thiệu and Kỳ into dismissing the general from his positions of military governor and Special Capital Military District Commander. A recent declassified CIA memo showed Thiệu as the one who requested general "Little" Minh, the Chief of General Staff, to investigate Đổng for protecting gambling operations, a claim that Minh disputed and refused to do as asked. The same memo showed Quát wanting to dismiss the general for being a troublemaker and Kỳ claiming Đổng as corrupted. All of their actions against the general came after Trí Quang's continuous accusation that Đổng was pro Catholics and perhaps even pro Diệm. The monk cited the general's unexplained actions toward some of Diệm's people as evidences, such as: protecting Lê Văn "White" Thái (Dr. Tuyến's assistant), or defending Trần Quốc Bửu (co-founder of the Cần Lao party) and Mã Tuyên (Head of the Triều Châu Chinese in Saigon).

For two years after the dismissal, Đổng remained in politics. He stayed in touch with two friends who had been exiled by Kỳ: Nguyễn Chánh Thi who sided with the monks during the Buddhist Crisis in Central Vietnam and Nguyễn Khánh who was too vocal against American intervention in Vietnamese affairs. During this period, he was sent to several special assignments abroad, most notably to Thailand where his friend and a former Diệm's supporter, general Thái Quang Hoàng was the Ambassador. In June 1967, Kỳ forced the general to retire.

The retirement did not stop Đổng from military and social affairs. He continued to keep in touch with ARVN general officers to learn of troops' morale and he mentored junior officers in tactics. He also continued to serve armed forces personnel by co-founding an association for ancient and current combatants, the Hiệp Hội Chiến Sĩ Tự Do. He worked with Australian Brigadier Ted Serong on a defense plan for the country in case the USA decided to stop all military aid. Closer to home, he continued to train his private army of Nùng soldiers.

==== From the height of a political career to exile ====
From 1969 to 1974, General Đổng served military personnel in a different capacity, Minister of War Veterans (equivalent to the US Secretary of Veterans Affairs). During this time, he worked with West Germany to get financial and medical support for disabled veterans. His relationship with German officials in Oberhausen resulted in military orphans or children of disabled veterans going there to further their education. Most of the students came from the seven ministry-sponsored Quốc Gia Nghĩa Tử schools. Minister Đổng's personal ties with Australian, Taiwanese and South Korean officials benefited Vietnamese veterans. During his tenure, Australia, Taiwan and South Korea provided much needed funding and training to disabled veterans at vocational facilities. His friendship with an American adviser Shelby Robert and his wife Miriam benefited the ministry as well. In April 1973, the Robert and the Gettysburg Presbyterian Church donated several wheelchairs and provided funding to train a Vietnamese doctor from the ministry. Later that year, the minister traveled to the United States and several western European countries to ask for financial assistance. The trip yielded good results: several US colleges provided the ministry with funding for its prosthetics center. In particular, Ohio State University sent professors to train teachers and to teach QGNT's students in three special courses: typing, accounting and home economics.

President Thiệu, in power since 1967, was becoming a dictator. By 1974, he had had thousands opposition persons arrested, and had increased the number of executions. Mass protest demonstrations led by opposition leaders in Saigon caused Thiệu to reorganize his cabinet in an attempt to quiet the opposition. He also used the occasion to get rid of potential threats to his power. Minister Đổng, with his own private army and considered by Thiệu as a potential threat, was dismissed from the cabinet in February 1974 and two months later imprisoned without trial on corruption charges. Government-run newspapers and television channels then launched a public humiliation campaign against the minister, accusing him of corruption and of plotting against the government. In June, a special committee acquitted the minister of all charges after hearing testimonies from the ministry's high-ranking staff. Still, Đổng was only released in July after Trần Quốc Bửu, head of the Tổng Liên Đoàn Lao Công (Confederation of Vietnamese Labor, the equivalent of the American AFL-CIO), and Father Hoàng Quỳnh of the Northern Catholics pressured Thiệu to do so.

After his release, General Đổng spent his time mentoring senior Army officers and advising civilian opposition leaders on tactics against President Thiệu. The Communist invasion in 1975 cut short of his attempt to return to political power.

During the Fall of Saigon, he and his family were able to escape on a US Air Force C130 that took them to Guam, and then onward to the United States where he was offered political asylum.

== Personal life ==
In his spare time, Đổng wrote poems to relax under the pen name of Nùng Khánh Lâm. In 1944 while he was stationed in Móng Cái, he wrote poems to court a Nùng woman, Lê Thị Lý (1919–1992). They got married and eventually had five children. After coming to the United States and settling in Arlington County, Virginia, Đổng would occasionally serve as a translator on special projects for the Defense Department before retiring in 1982 to take care of his wife who had suffered from a stroke.

Two years after Lý died, Đổng remarried to Mỹ-Lan Trịnh, from whom he acquired three stepdaughters. In 1996, he and his new family moved to Philadelphia, Pennsylvania where he died of congestive heart failure on November 26, 2008. Major General Phạm Văn Đổng is survived by his second wife Mỹ-Lan, five children, three stepchildren, nine grandchildren and three great-grandchildren.

== Awards and decorations ==
General Đổng earned the following personal Vietnamese and foreign decorations and awards (unit citations are not listed):

=== Vietnam Decorations ===
- Officer of the Imperial Order of the Dragon of Annam
- Commander of the National Order of Vietnam
- Army Distinguished Service Order, First Class
- Gallantry Cross, with 18 citations – Palms & Gold Stars
- Chuong My Merit Medal, First Class
- Ethnic Development Medal, First Class

=== Foreign Decorations and Awards ===
- France :
  - Knight of the Legion of Honour
  - Officier of the National Order of Merit
  - Croix de Guerre with Bronze Star
  - Croix de guerre des Théatres d'Opérations Extérieures avec 2 palmes d'argent et 4 citations de bronze
  - Volunteer Combatant's Cross
  - Colonial Medal
  - Honour medal for courage and devotion
  - 1939–1945 Commemorative war Medal
  - Indochina Campaign Commemorative Medal
- Taiwan :
  - Order of Blue Sky and White Sun with Grand Cordon
  - Order of Brilliant Star, 1st Class
- South Korea :
  - Order of Military Merit, Eulji Medal
  - Order of Service Merit, 2nd Class
- Thailand :
  - Commander of the Order of the White Elephant
