= Trần Văn Minh (diplomat) =

Vietnamese diplomat and general (1923–2009)

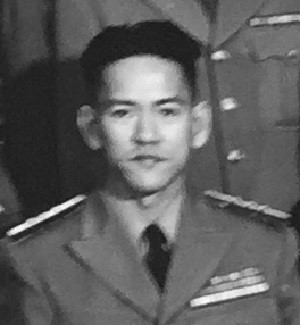

3rd Commander-in-chief of Republic of Vietnam Armed Forces
- In office 21 January 1965 – July 1965
- Preceded by: Nguyễn Khánh (as Chairman of Council of Armed Forces)
- Succeeded by: Nguyễn Hữu Có (as Chief of the Joint General Staff)

Minister of National Defense
- In office 18 January 1965 – 16 February 1965
- Prime Minister: Trần Văn Hương
- Preceded by: Trần Văn Hương
- Succeeded by: Nguyễn Văn Thiệu

South Vietnamese Ambassador to Chad
- In office November 1967 – March 1974

Personal details
- Born: 19 August 1923 Saigon, French Indochina
- Died: 31 May 2009 (aged 85) Nice, France

Military service
- Allegiance: France; State of Vietnam; South Vietnam
- Branch/service: French Army; Vietnamese National Army; Army of the Republic of Vietnam
- Rank: Lieutenant General (Trung Tướng)

Lieutenant General Sylvain Trần Văn Minh (19 August 1923, in Saigon, French Cochinchina – 31 May 2009, in Nice, France) was a Vietnamese diplomat and a general of the Army of the Republic of Vietnam.

In 1942, he passed the entry exam for the St Cyr/St Maixent Military Academy organized in Tong, Indochina. From 1943 to 1945, Lieutenant Minh served with the 9th R.I.C. During this period, he participated in operations in Central and North Vietnam, most notably in Cha Pa. After the Japanese coup of 9 March 1945, he accompanied General Alessandri's troops in the retreat to China. In 1946, he was part of the French troops that retook Dien Bien Phu. From there, he eventually made his way to Saigon, travelling on the Mekong River through Luang Prabang and Vientiane. Deployed to the 22nd R.I.C. (1946–47), he was in charge of protecting military convoys between Saigon and Dalat.

Minh was named Directeur des Etudes (Chánh Sở Nghiên cứu – Director of Intelligence) for the Governor of North Vietnam, Nghiêm Xuân Thiện. 1950 found him in Paris studying at the War Academy (École de Guerre à Paris). Upon his return to Vietnam, he worked at the newly formed State of Vietnam's Ministry of Defense. Two years later, he served on the Chief of Staff. During this time, he worked with General de Lattre de Tassigny in the "Vietnamization" of the Corps Expéditionnaire Français. After participating in Operation Atlante, he was promoted to Commander of the South Sector.

In 1955, Colonel Minh was one of the French delegates at the Geneva Convention. After the accords were signed, he returned home to take command of the first military region in South Vietnam. Late 1955, he was promoted to Général de brigade (Brigadier). A year later, the 33-year-old Minh was promoted to Général de division (Major General). From 1957 to 1959, he served as Commandant of the Dalat military academy. In 1960, President Ngô Đình Diệm named him Inspector General the National Defense, a post he held until 1963.

In 1964–65, he was the Chief of General Staff and in 1965, Minister of Defense. The last position he held was Ambassador of the Republic of Vietnam to Tunis, Tunisia from 1971 until 30 April 1975, when Saigon fell.

Military offices
Preceded by Trần Văn Hương	Minister of Defense; 1965	Succeeded by Nguyễn Văn Thiệu
