= Central Intelligence Office =

The Central Intelligence Office (vi: Phủ Đặc ủy Trung ương Tình báo) was the national strategic intelligence agency for the government of the Republic of Vietnam (South Vietnam), headquarters in Saigon. It was created in 1961, via Executive Decree No. 109/TTP, signed into law on May 5, 1961, by President Ngô Đình Diệm. The agency was responsible for investigating, gathering and analyzing strategic & military intelligence information on communist North Vietnam, and its branch in South Vietnam, the Viet Cong, and report and advise the South Vietnamese government on national security.

== Organization ==
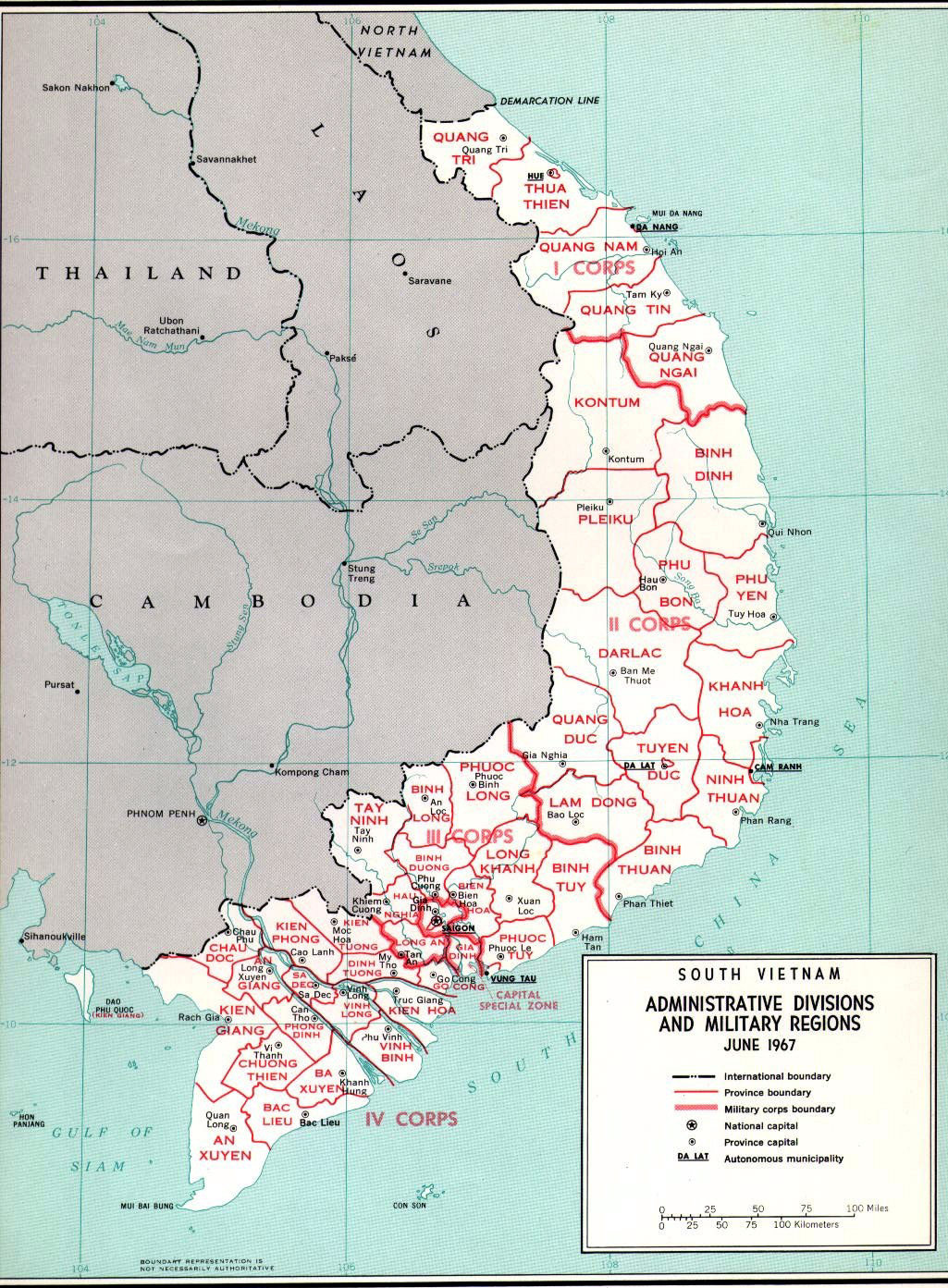
The four Military Tactical Corps Zones

The Intelligence Office included three divisions:

- Domestic Intelligence Bureau (Cục Tình báo Quốc nội). This division has a department for surveillance of domestic communist/enemy activities (Department K); a counterespionage department (Dept. U); and a political department e.g. on subversive political activities like coup d'etats and on the North Vietnamese government (Dept. Z).
- Foreign Intelligence Bureau (Cục Tình báo Quốc ngoại)
- National Inquiry Centre (Trung tâm Thẩm vấn Quốc gia). This division was only responsible for receiving and sending prisoners, e.g. POWs, suspected communists etc., for interrogation

Each military corps zone (I - IV) has one Special Contact Mission under the Domestic Intelligence Bureau. Overseas, there are Foreign Intelligence Bureau departments in France, the United Kingdom, Japan, Thailand and Cambodia.

== Fall of Saigon ==
According to journalist Huy Đức's 2013 book, Bên Thắng cuộc (The Winning Side), on April 24, 1975, Nguyễn Khắc Bình (Director of the CIO) secretly fled. Acting President Trần Văn Hương then appointed Nguyễn Phát Lộc, an assistant of Binh, as the new Director. On the afternoon of April 28, 1975, the U.S. Embassy in Saigon asked all CIO staff to evacuate to 3 Bạch Đằng St. and await for evacuation out of Vietnam; they fled to 2 Nguyễn Hậu St. afterwards. However, on April 30, 1975, at 01:00, electronic communication between the Embassy and CIO staff were cut, leaving them stranded there.

== Chronological List of CIO Directors ==
- Lieutenant Colonel Lê Liêm
- Colonel Nguyễn Văn Y
- Lieutenant General Mai Hữu Xuân
- Brigadier General Nguyễn Ngọc Loan
- Lieutenant General Linh Quang Viên
- Colonel Nguyễn Khắc Bình
- Nguyễn Phát Lộc
- Captain Nguyễn Phúc Sanh - Foreign Intelligence - Cục Tình báo Quốc ngoại

== See also ==
- National Intelligence Service (Republic of Korea) (Republic of Korea - South Korea)
- National Security Bureau (Republic of China) (Republic of China - Taiwan)
- Bundesnachrichtendienst (Federal Republic of Germany - West Germany)
- CIA (United States of America)
