= Trần Quang Vinh =

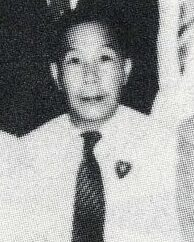
- Vinh in a meeting of pro-Bảo Đại politicians in British Hong Kong in 1947

Minister of National Defense of State of Vietnam
- In office 1 July 1949 – 31 May 1950
- Prime Minister: Bảo Đại
- Preceded by: Himself (as Minister of National Defense of the PCG)
- Succeeded by: Phan Huy Quát

Minister of National Defense of Provisional Central Government of Vietnam
- In office 27 May 1948 – 30 June 1949
- Chief: Nguyễn Văn Xuân
- Preceded by: Position established
- Succeeded by: Himself (as Minister of National Defense of the State of Vietnam)

Commander-in-chief of the Caodaist Armed Forces
- In office 1947–1951
- Leader: Phạm Công Tắc

Personal details
- Born: 8 September 1897 Long Xuyên, French Cochinchina, Indochinese Union
- Died: 1977
- Children: 2
- Education: Collège Chasseloup-Laubat

Military service
- Allegiance: Caodaism
- Years of service: 1943–1953
- Rank: Lieutenant general
- Commands: Commander-ịn-chief of the Caodaist Armed Forces

Trần Quang Vinh (1897–1977) was a political and military leader of the Cao Đài sect active at the time of the establishment of the 1945 Empire of Vietnam. He also the first minister of National Defense of State of Vietnam.

Vinh had been commander of the Cao Dai's paramilitaries, but stepped aside in August 1945 because of his associations with the Japanese. In October 1945 he was briefly captured by the Viet Minh but escaped after 4 months.
