= Nguyễn Phước Vĩnh Lộc =

South Vietnamese general (1923–2009)

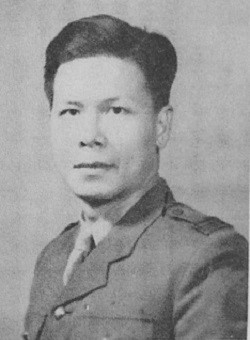
- Born: October 23, 1923; Huế, French Indochina
- Died: January 8, 2009 (aged 85); Houston, Texas, U.S.
- Children: 7
- Military career
- Allegiance: South Vietnam
- Branch: Army of the Republic of Vietnam
- Service years: 1950–1975
- Rank: Lieutenant General (Trung Tướng)
- Conflicts: Vietnam War

Nguyễn Phúc Vĩnh Lộc (23 October 1923 – 8 January 2009) was a Lieutenant general of the Army of the Republic of Vietnam (ARVN) during the Vietnam War.

== Early life ==
Vĩnh Lộc was born in Huế on 23 October 1923 when the city was a part of the French protectorate of Annam, French Indochina. He was a cousin of the emperor Bảo Đại, the last Emperor of the Nguyễn dynasty.

== Military career ==
During the Vietnam War, Vĩnh Lộc served as the commander of II Corps, which oversaw the Central Highlands from 23 June 1965 until 28 February 1968, replacing Major General Nguyễn Hữu Có.

In late 1965 COMUSMACV General William Westmoreland regarded the II Corps leadership as shaky. He had passed on his dissatisfaction with Vĩnh Lộc, to Junta leader Air Vice Marshal Nguyễn Cao Kỳ and Defense Minister Có several times, characterizing Vĩnh Lộc's abilities as "marginal" and his retention "a calculated risk." Westmoreland felt that the isolated Highlands was an allied weak point and expected heavy fighting there. The local senior adviser, Colonel Theodore C. Metaxis, held similar opinions and, as an alternative, suggested that Vĩnh Lộc be made political governor of the Highlands and his military responsibilities delegated to someone else.

During the 1966 Buddhist Uprising he declared that he was neither for Struggle Movement leader General Nguyễn Chánh Thi nor Junta leader Kỳ which raised the possibility of his defecting to the Struggle Movement. However the Struggle Movement was eventually crushed and Thi exiled.

During the Tet Offensive he was described as spending the early days leading troops in Pleiku like an infantry captain rather than performing his duties as a Corps commander.

Vĩnh Lộc was eventually replaced by Lieutenant General Lữ Mộng Lan on 23 February 1968. The demise of Vĩnh Lộc was a victory for both President Nguyễn Văn Thiệu and Westmoreland. He had ruled the Central Highlands as a personal fief since 1965 and was the last of the old, independent general-warlords who had habitually defied the central government in Saigon. To Americans, he was a "mercurial, unstable opportunist" - more of a politician than a general and more effective as a governor than a fighter.

== Later life and death ==
He died in Houston, Texas on 8 January 2009.
