= Minister of National Defense (South Vietnam) =

South Vietnam government minister

- Tổng trưởng Quốc phòng (Vietnamese)
- Personal seal (1948–75)

- Flag of the minister

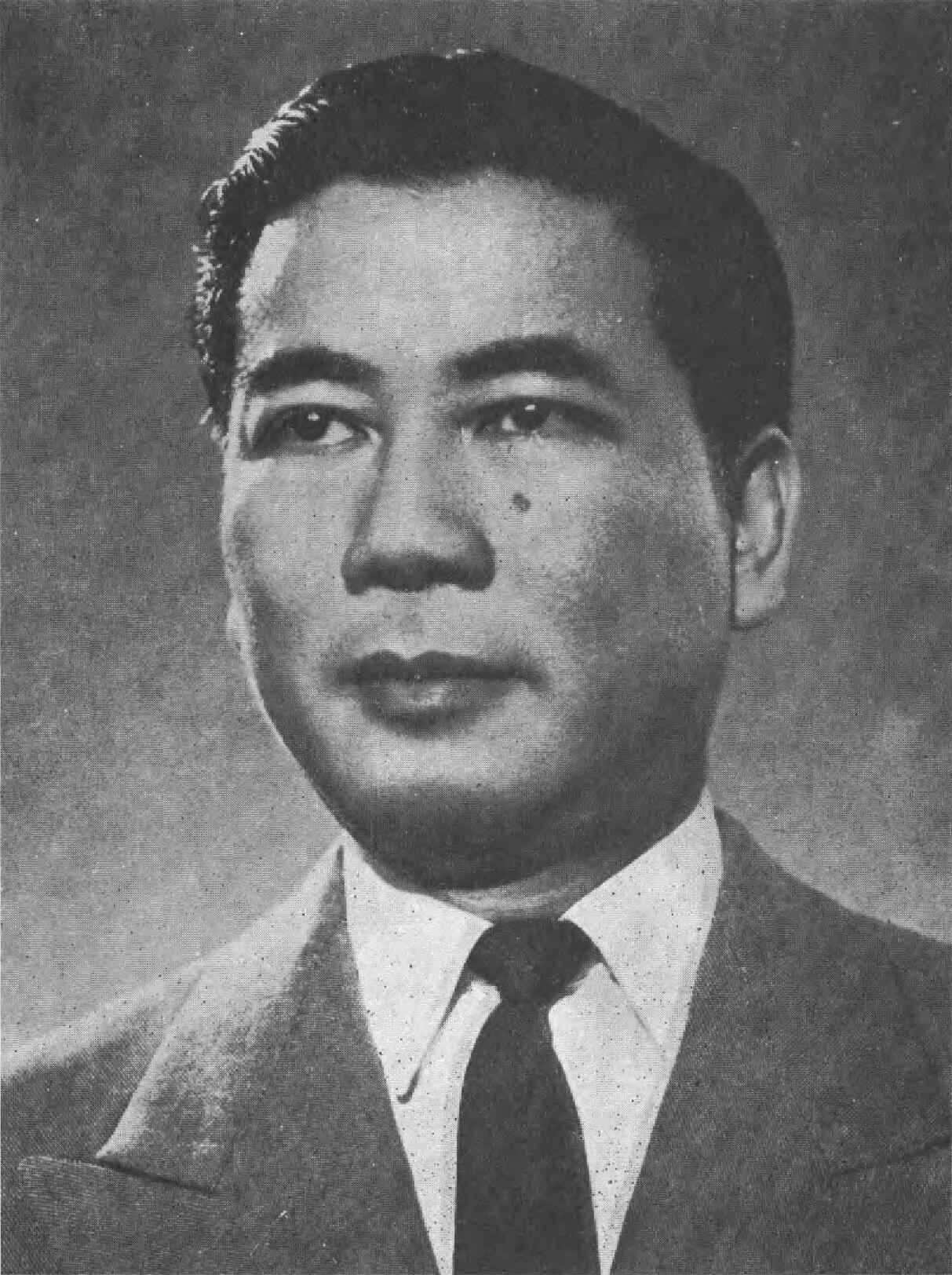
- Longest serving Ngô Đình Diệm; 6 July 1954 – 2 November 1963
- Ministry of National Defense
- Reports to: The president
- Seat: Saigon (now Ho Chi Minh City)
- Appointer: The chief of state (1949–55); The president (1955–75)
- Formation: 1949; 77 years ago
- First holder: Trần Quang Vinh
- Final holder: Trần Văn Đôn
- Abolished: 1975; 51 years ago
- Superseded by: Minister of Defence (South Vietnam)

The minister of national defense (Vietnamese: Tổng trưởng Quốc phòng Quốc) was a government minister in charge of the Ministry of National Defense of South Vietnam. The minister was responsible for conducting defense strategies and affairs related to the country's military.

== List of ministers ==
The following is a list of defence ministers of South Vietnam from 1949 until the fall of Saigon in 1975:

=== State of Vietnam (1949–1955) ===
No.	Portrait	Name (born–died)	Term of office			Political party	Government(s)	Ref.
No.	Portrait	Name (born–died)	Took office	Left office	Time in office	Political party	Government(s)	Ref.
1		Trần Quang Vinh (1897–1977)	27 May 1948	20 January 1950	1 year, 238 days	Independent	Provisional Government; Bao Dai	
2		Phan Huy Quát (1908–1979)	20 January 1950	7 May 1950	107 days	Nationalist Party of Greater Vietnam		
3		Trần Văn Hữu (1896–1984)	6 May 1950	21 February 1951	291 days	Independent		
4		Nguyễn Hữu Chi (1896–1984)	21 February 1951	7 March 1952	1 year, 15 days	Independent		
(3)		Trần Văn Hữu (1896–1984)	7 March 1952	6 June 1952	91 days	Independent		
5		Nghiêm Văn Trí (1907–?)	6 June 1952	January 1953	107 days	Independent		
–		Lê Quang Huy (?–?)	7 January 1953	8 January 1953	1 day	Independent		
(2)		Phan Huy Quát (1908–1979)	8 January 1953	17 December 1953	343 days	Nationalist Party of Greater Vietnam		
6		Ngô Đình Diệm (1901–1963)	6 July 1954	26 October 1955	1 year, 112 days	Personalist Labor Revolutionary Party		

=== Republic of Vietnam (1955–1975) ===
No.	Portrait	Name (born–died)	Term of office			Political party	Government(s)	Ref.
No.	Portrait	Name (born–died)	Took office	Left office	Time in office	Political party	Government(s)	Ref.
1		Ngô Đình Diệm (1901–1963)	26 October 1955	2 November 1963 X	8 years, 7 days	Personalist Labor Revolutionary Party		
2		Trần Văn Đôn (1917–1997)	4 November 1963	30 January 1964	87 days	Independent		
3		Trần Thiện Khiêm (1925–2021)	8 February 1964	9 September 1964	223 days	Military		
4		Nguyễn Khánh (1927–2013)	9 September 1964	4 November 1964	56 days	Military		
5		Trần Văn Hương (1902–1982)	4 November 1964	18 January 1965	75 days	Independent		
6		Trần Văn Minh (1923–2009)	18 January 1965	16 February 1965	29 days	Military		
7		Nguyễn Văn Thiệu (1923–2001)	16 February 1965	20 June 1965	124 days	Military		
8		Nguyễn Hữu Có (1925–2012)	21 June 1965	26 January 1967	1 year, 219 days	Military		
9		Cao Văn Viên (1921–2008)	26 January 1967	9 November 1967	286 days	Military		
10		Nguyễn Văn Vy (1916–1981)	9 November 1967	6 August 1972	4 years, 271 days	Military		
(3)		Trần Thiện Khiêm (1925–2021)	6 August 1972	14 April 1975	2 years, 251 days	Military		
(2)		Trần Văn Đôn (1917–1997)	14 April 1975	28 April 1975	14 days	Independent		
