= Nguyễn Văn Vỹ =

South Vietnamese commander and politician (1916–1981)

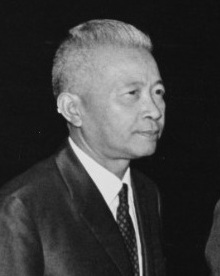
- Vỹ greeting US Secretary of Defense Melvin Laird at Tan Son Nhat Airport in 1971

Minister of National Defense
- In office 9 November 1967 – 6 August 1972
- President: Nguyễn Văn Thiệu
- Prime Minister: Trần Thiện Khiêm
- Preceded by: Cao Văn Viên
- Succeeded by: Trần Thiện Khiêm

Personal details
- Born: 16 January 1916 Hanoi, Tonkin, French Indochina
- Died: 1981 (age 65) Saint-Mandé, France

Military service
- Allegiance: State of Vietnam; Republic of Vietnam
- Branch/service: Vietnamese National Army; Army of the Republic of Vietnam
- Years of service: 1939 – 25 October 1955 (Vietnamese National Army); 26 October 1955 – 30 April 1975 (Army of the Republic of Vietnam)
- Rank: Lieutenant general (Trung tướng)

Nguyễn Văn Vỹ (Vietnamese pronunciation: [ŋwiən˦ˀ˥ van˧˧ vi˧˧]; 16 January 1916 – 1981) was a South Vietnamese soldier who rose to the rank of General in the Army of the Republic of Vietnam (ARVN). In addition to his military career, he served as Minister of National Defense of the Republic of Vietnam from 1967 to 1972.

Vy was born in 1916 in Hanoi.

== Military career ==
After graduating from the administration school, against his father wishes, joined the French Officer military academy and served as an officer of an airborne regiment. He was a veteran of the Dien Bien Phu battle and took part in the allied landing in Korea. He originally served in the Vietnamese National Army under General Nguyễn Văn Hinh. On 1 May 1955 Vy was arrested after trying to take over the Army in the name of Emperor Bảo Đại to stop Ngô Đình Diệm from taking power fraudulently, and was forced to flee to France as an exile.

Vy returned to South Vietnam after the 1963 coup which removed Diem from power and led to his assassination. He was arrested during the January 1964 South Vietnamese coup for being a member of the military committee command staff, under General Dương Văn Minh (or "Big Minh"). It was the late President Diem and his brother Ngo Dinh Nhu who want to open talks with the North Vietnamese. Like most of the military leaders involved in the alleged plot, he was soon released. He rose to the rank of Lieutenant General, and was appointed Chief of Staff of the Army of the Republic of Vietnam in 1967.

In February 1967 Prime Minister Nguyễn Cao Kỳ appointed him and the Defense Minister, General Cao Văn Viên, to a committee to root out corruption among senior military personnel. President Nguyễn Văn Thiệu replaced Viên as Defense Minister with Vy on 25 May 1968. As Defense Minister, Vy ran the Servicemen's Mutual Aid and Savings Fund (SMASF), a government-run and owned pension fund for South Vietnamese military personnel.

In 1971 Vy allegedly embezzled millions of dollars from the fund in order to create or buy the Bank of Industry and Commerce, Vicco (a road and bridge construction company), Vi-navatco (a transportation firm), Icico (an insurance company), and Foproco (a food processing company). On 22 March Thiệu dismissed five of Vy's senior aides due to a scandal relating to the SMASF. Thiệu removed him from office on 6 August 1972. He was placed under house arrest, and fired in March 1974. He died in the Bégin Military Teaching Hospital in 1981 at the age of 65.

== Awards and decorations ==
- South Vietnam :
  - Grand Officer of the National Order of Vietnam
  - Army Distinguished Service Order, First Class
  - Air Force Distinguished Service Order, First Class
