= Trần Kim Tuyến =

South Vietnamese intelligence officer (1925–1995)

- Born: 24 May 1925; Ninh Bình Province, French Indochina
- Died: 23 July 1995 (aged 70); Cambridge, England
- Military career
- Allegiance: State of Vietnam
- Branch: Central Intelligence Office
- Service years: 1954–1975
- Rank: Chief of Intelligence

Trần Kim Tuyến (24 May 1925 – 23 July 1995) was the chief of intelligence of South Vietnam under its first President Ngô Đình Diệm from 1955 to 1963. As a Roman Catholic, he was trusted by the Ngô family, and was part of their inner circle. Tuyến was responsible for a variety of propaganda campaigns against communists, and was prominent in operating the secret Cần Lao party apparatus which maintained the Ngô family's rule.

In the course of his work, Tuyến emulated the tactics of the communists. He eventually became disillusioned and plotted against the regime before being exiled. After Diệm was deposed, Tuyến returned to South Vietnam, but the military junta which had replaced the Ngô family jailed him for five years. He fled the country in 1975 as Saigon was falling.

== Early years ==
A short and light man at less than 45 kilograms or 99 pounds, Tuyến hailed from Phát Diêm, Ninh Bình Province, Vietnam, French Indochina. He studied at the French-founded university in Hanoi, obtaining degrees in law and medicine. As a university student, he had protested against the French colonial administration's control over Vietnam's Catholic clergy, landing him in trouble with the police.

However, his religious convictions caused him to spurn the Hồ Chí Minh-led Viet Minh independence movement, which was strongly atheist. Although he was ambitious, Tuyến was aware of his provincial accent and his manner of stumbling over long words, which was not considered to be consistent with the archetypal leader with a city accent. In 1946, while still a student, Tuyến came to know the Ngô family by chance. His future mentor Ngô Đình Nhu wanted to travel from Hanoi to a Catholic area near the border with Laos and needed a guide. A Catholic priest asked Tuyến to lead the way on a bicycle while Nhu followed in a covered cyclo to evade French colonial and Vietminh attention.

== Rise to power ==
In mid-1954, at the time the Geneva Conference had concluded, Tuyến had been working for the anti-communist Vietnamese National Army of the State of Vietnam in an outlying province, only travelling to Hanoi during the weekends. As a result of the discussions in Geneva, Vietnam was to be temporarily partitioned pending national reunification elections in 1956. In the meantime, the Vietminh controlled the Democratic Republic of Vietnam in the north, and the State of Vietnam was handed the south. The agreements also allowed for the free passage of civilians between either side for 300 days, while military personnel were obliged to move to their respective zones. Tuyến had persuaded a substantial number of northern Catholics to leave their homes and move south. As a result, he later tried to persuade Diệm to maintain some contact with members of the communist regime in Hanoi in the hope of persuading them to defect.

Tuyến was in Hanoi when his sister's husband told him that he could travel to Saigon immediately on the plane of Prime Minister Diệm of the State of Vietnam — Diệm had been in Hanoi to urge civilians to flee communist rule and head into the south of the country. Tuyến decided to make use of the opportunity and left with only a pair of spare trousers and the clothes on his back. His fiancée accepted his indirect marriage proposal — he asked her if she would join him in the south. Tuyến accepted Diệm's offer that he work for his younger brother, Nhu. Tuyến lived in the Independence Palace, sleeping on the floor, as Diệm sought to restore order in the south. Tuyến was unemployed for two months before being assigned to the Ministry of Information, essentially a propaganda unit.

In 1955, Diem created the Service des Études Politiques et Sociales (Service for Political and Social Studies, SEPES), which for the surveillance of government officials, which according to the historian Edward Miller, 'would eventually become one of the most feared components of the Diem government's security apparatus', and Tuyến was made its inaugural director. Tuyến developed SEPES into a complex body that oversaw secret anti-communist missions domestically and also Laos, but was mainly used to monitor public servants, military personnel, police and non-communist opposition politicians and activists through a network of regime informants throughout the civil and military apparatus.

== Campaigns ==
Tuyến's first task was to disperse the approximately 800,000 northerners who had migrated south during the free travel period in Operation Passage to Freedom before the partition of Vietnam. Most were Catholics who had moved after a propaganda campaign designed to build a strong Catholic anti-communist power base for Diệm in the south, using the slogan "The Virgin Mary has gone south". Believing they had made a great sacrifice in moving, the northerners insisted on settling in or near the overcrowded capital Saigon, which had better urban amenities than regional and rural areas.

Tuyến decided to emulate communist propaganda techniques. He sent some elderly people to a Saigon camp to pose as refugees, and then ordered the police to stage a noisy arrest scene. His staff took photographs of the incident and distributed pamphlets claiming that communists had infiltrated the camps. This fear-mongering campaign prompted refugees to disperse for fear of being arrested for being communists. Tuyến targeted a clandestine newspaper run by anti-Diệm nationalist intellectuals, by printing counterfeit copies of the magazine with communist propaganda substituted in place of the real content. He then circulated the fake copies and then had the outlet banned for being communist. Tuyến later supervised the operations of various newspapers that acted as government mouthpieces, including the Cach Mang Quoc Gia (National Revolution).

Nhu took Tuyến under his wing and asked him to draft the rules for the Cần Lao, a secret Catholic body founded by Nhu, which consisted of many small cells that were used to spy on South Vietnamese society at all levels, in order to detect and quash opposition. The Cần Lao was anti-communist but drew its totalitarian techniques from both Stalinist and Nazi models. SEPES, with Tuyến leading the way, was responsible to screening prospective members, fundraising and indoctrination of new recruits. In mid-1956, Nhu appointed Tuyến as his go-between with CIA agents stationed in South Vietnam. The U.S. ambassador Frederick Reinhardt arranged for Tuyến to work with CIA agents such as Philip Potter and William Colby, who later became the Director of CIA under President Richard Nixon. Nhu and Tuyến used SEPES to send men into North Vietnam to engage in sabotage and propaganda. Almost all were either imprisoned or killed. His methods led some CIA agents to refer to him as "Vietnam's Goebbels". Tuyến had an intelligence unit of 500 men, and was used by Nhu as a fixer, to arrange secret meetings with dissidents.

Tuyến was involved in internal power struggles within the Diem regime's intelligence sector, overcoming the chairman of the National Revolutionary Movement, the regime's mass movement, Tran Chanh Thanh, who was removed in 1957 with Nhu's assistance. He then sidelined Huynh Van Lang, a young Catholic who was the party's financial director and had grown the Can Lao's financial outlets. Tuyến convinced Nhu to reduce Lang's authority.

Due to Tuyến's profile in the regime's repression, US Ambassador Elbridge Durbrow suggested to Diem in 1960 that Tuyến be removed from public power and sent overseas in a suite of liberalisation measures, which Diem rejected.

Tuyến was a key figure in persuading undecided ARVN divisions to support Diệm and put down the 1960 South Vietnamese coup attempt.

In 1962, Nhu appointed Tuyến and Colonel Phạm Ngọc Thảo, a communist double agent from a Catholic background, to oversee the Strategic Hamlet Program, which attempted to isolate the Viet Cong by barricading villagers inside fortified compounds, theoretically locking the communists out. Tuyến led the way in promoting the concept to the populace.

== Downfall ==
Time passed and Tuyến began to show displeasure at the increasing interference of Nhu's wife, Madame Nhu into politics; displeasure turned to offence and Nhu began to ignore Tuyến. In early 1963, Tuyến was ordered by Diệm to go home and rest because the latter thought the former had been too lenient with disillusioned military officers and politicians who were veering towards opposition. Tuyến was never recalled to work. Instead, Tuyến responded by dispatching his staff back to their former position they had held before they joined his department, leaving the intelligence bureau in a state of collapse. In May, when the Buddhist crisis erupted after Diệm's forces had banned Buddhists from flying the Buddhist flag to commemorate Vesak, and fatally fired on them, Diệm recalled Tuyến, hoping he could resolve the crisis.

Tuyến eventually began to plot against the Ngo family. He began meeting with Colonel Đỗ Mậu, the chief of military security and other colonels in key leadership positions in the marine and paratroop divisions around Saigon. He also used his contacts in the Cao Đài and Hòa Hảo religious sects in plotting the coup. With growing displeasure among the populace against the Diệm regime, Tuyến targeted 15 July as the date for a coup but was unable to recruit the generals required for his plan as he was too closely associated with Nhu to gain their trust.

In the end, Tuyến's old group ended up being led by Thảo, who was deliberately fomenting discord among the army in order to help the communists. Thảo's group did not lead the coup, as they were integrated into the main group led by Generals Dương Văn Minh and Trần Văn Đôn, which would depose and assassinate Diệm and Nhu on 2 November 1963.

Aware that Tuyến might be involved in plotting against Diệm, Nhu sent him to Cairo as ambassador. At the time, the Soviet Union-aligned Egypt was leading a campaign of African countries against South Vietnam at the United Nations, and Nhu ostensibly sent him to Cairo to lead a diplomatic push against communist influence there. It was effectively an exile for Tuyến. Upon arriving in Cairo, Tuyến was greeted with the news that Egypt had extended diplomatic relations to North Vietnam. Tuyến eventually flew to Hong Kong, where British intelligence provided him with protection; Tuyến kept in contact with anti-Diệm forces in Vietnam.

After Diệm was overthrown in November 1963, Tuyến decided to return to Vietnam. His wife was pregnant and he reasoned that as he had no enemies in the military junta and had worked well with them in the past, he would be safe. However, he was arrested and tried by the junta for corruption and abuse of power, and sentenced to five years in prison. Tuyến believed he was jailed because the generals were afraid that he would claim they were corrupt puppets of Nhu.

When his prison term ended, Tuyến remained under house arrest after the brother of President Nguyễn Văn Thiệu intervened. Tuyến's wife was allowed to teach in a high school and Tuyến was allowed to write political columns under an assumed name. In April 1975, as South Vietnam collapsed amid a communist onslaught, British intelligence arranged for Tuyến's wife and their three youngest children to leave for Cambridge, where their eldest son was studying. Tuyến was reluctant to leave, but did so on 29 April 1975, the day before the fall of Saigon. He departed on one of the last helicopters from 22 Gia Long Street and flew out of the besieged city with the help of Phạm Xuân Ẩn, a Time magazine correspondent and – ironically – a communist spy.
