= Đỗ Mậu =

South Vietnamese military officer and politician (1917–2002)

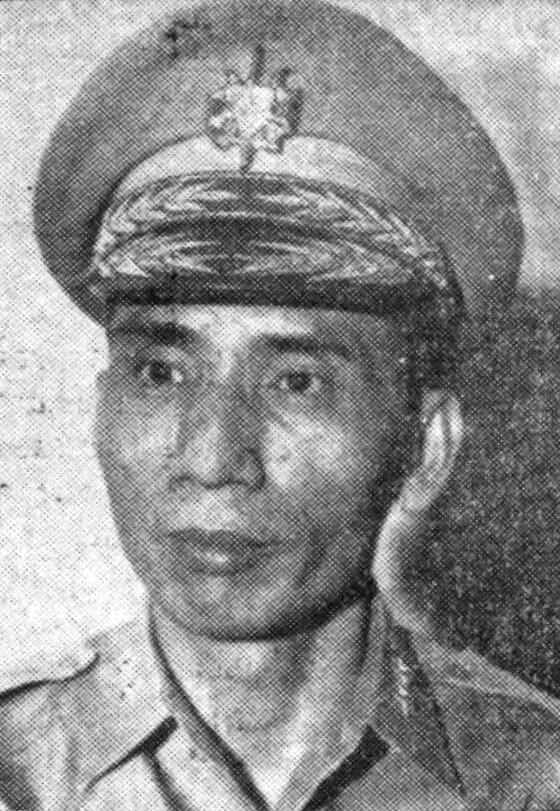
- Mậu in 1964

Deputy Prime Minister of South Vietnam
- In office 8 February 1964 – 30 September 1964 Serving with: Nguyễn Tôn Hoàn; Nguyễn Xuân Oánh
- Prime Minister: Nguyễn Khánh
- Preceded by: Position established
- Succeeded by: Nguyễn Lưu Viên

Personal details
- Born: 1 July 1917 Quảng Bình province, Annam, French Indochina
- Died: 11 April 2002 (aged 84) California, U.S.
- Party: National Social Democratic Front
- Other political affiliations: Military (1963–1967)
- Spouse: Nguyễn Thị Hải
- Children: 10
- Occupation: Information Minister (November 1963 – January 1964); Deputy Prime Minister for social and cultural affairs (1964); Co-founder of the political party Lực Lượng Dân Tộc Việt (The National Viet People's Force), 1960s Author of the political memoirs: Việt Nam Máu Lửa Quê Hương Tôi (Vietnam, My Country in Blood and Fire; ed. 1986, 1996; ISBN 1-884129-31-5) and Tâm Thư (Letter from the Heart, ed. 1995)

Military service
- Allegiance: Vietnamese National Army, Army of the Republic of Vietnam
- Years of service: 1940s–1965
- Rank: Major General
- Commands: Director of Military Security (1958–1963)
- Battles/wars: 1963 South Vietnamese coup, January 1964 South Vietnamese coup

Đỗ Mậu (Vietnamese pronunciation: [ʔɗo˦ˀ˥ məw˧˨ʔ]; 1 July 1917 – 11 April 2002) was a major general in the South Vietnamese Army of the Republic of Vietnam (ARVN), best known for his roles as a recruiting strategist in both the 1963 coup that toppled President Ngô Đình Diệm and the 1964 coup led by General Nguyễn Khánh that deposed the junta of General Dương Văn Minh. He was born in Quảng Bình Province.

Having abandoned the Communist-led Việt Minh resistance to join the Vietnamese National Army, the predecessor of the ARVN, Mau rose to be head of military security under Diệm. At that time a colonel with no troops to command, Mậu was nevertheless an important member of the conspiracy due to his liaisons with a wide number of officers, which allowed him to recruit widely for coup participants. He initially tried to organize a coup group himself with Colonel Phạm Ngọc Thảo, an undetected communist agent bent on maximising infighting, and disillusioned intelligence director Trần Kim Tuyến mainly consisting of mid-level officers. Later this group was integrated into the main plot led by a group of generals; Mậu had helped to liaise between some of these generals. He also concocted false data to convince Diệm to send the ARVN Special Forces—mainly used to defend Diệm and his family from coups in Saigon—into the countryside to battle a non-existent large-scale communist attack. The coup was successful and Diệm was captured and executed.

After the coup, Mậu was promoted to major general and made one of 12 members of the ruling junta. Fearing his political skills, the leading generals tried to sideline him and placed him in the non-influential post of Information Minister, where he censored newspapers. Mậu responded by plotting his own coup, joining forces with Nguyễn Khánh, Dương Văn Đức, Trần Thiện Khiêm, Nguyễn Chánh Thi and Dương Ngọc Lắm. Three months after Diệm was deposed, the next coup was successful without needing a battle. Mậu was then made one of three deputy prime ministers, overseeing social and cultural affairs. Disillusioned with Khánh's tendency toward military dictatorship, and isolated by the young generals, Mậu retired from the military for good in 1964.

== Early years and career ==
During the 1940s, Mậu had joined the Việt Minh resistance as a Battalion Commanding officer in the Central Vietnam, but became disillusioned by Communist cadres. He then joined the French-backed Vietnamese National Army (VNA) of the State of Vietnam and trained at a French military academy. A quietly spoken officer, Mậu rose up the ranks, and the VNA became the ARVN after the State of Vietnam became the Republic of Vietnam when Prime Minister Diệm deposed Bảo Đại and declared himself president in a fraudulent referendum organised by Diệm's brother and advisor, Ngô Đình Nhu.

== 1963 coup ==
The ruling Ngô family came under pressure in the Buddhist crisis of 1963, when discontent among the country's Buddhist majority towards the pro-Catholic regime erupted into civil unrest. There were many conspiracies against Diệm in 1963, many of them by different cliques of military officers independent from one another. According to Ellen Hammer, there were "perhaps as many as six and possibly more" different plots, and these spanned the gamut of society to include civilian politicians, union leaders, and university students.

In mid-1963, one group consisted of mid-level officers such as colonels, majors, and captains. Mậu was in this group, which was coordinated by Trần Kim Tuyến, South Vietnam's director of intelligence. Tuyến had been a palace insider, but a rift had developed in recent years, and he began to plot as early as 1962. As South Vietnam was a police state, Tuyến was an extremely powerful figure with many contacts. Another in the group was Colonel Phạm Ngọc Thảo, an undetected communist agent who was deliberately fomenting infighting among the officers and mismanaging the Strategic Hamlet Program in order to destabilize the Saigon government.

Tuyến's group had many officers who were members of the opposition Việt Nam Quốc Dân Đảng and Đại Việt Quốc Dân Đảng parties, which had been discriminated against in promotions, which were preferentially given to members of the regime's secret Cần Lao Party. These included commanders of airborne, marine and tank units from the 5th Division, mostly at battalion level. As Mậu was in a role that involved coordinating with other senior officers, he was an effective conduit for coup plotting. He was popular and needed by the other officers as he was able to keep compromising information about them from Nhu, Diệm's younger brother and main strategist.

When Tuyến's machinations were discovered, he was exiled by Nhu. Mậu and Thảo took over but their initial coup plans for July 15 were shelved when American CIA officer Lucien Conein instructed Thảo's superior, General Trần Thiện Khiêm, the head of the ARVN, to stop the coup on the grounds that it was premature. Thảo and Mậu's group resumed plotting, intending to move on 24 October, and they recruited a total of 3,000 men. They augmented their forces with an assortment of officers from auxiliary units such as from the Signal Corps, Transportation Corps and some Republic of Vietnam Air Force pilots. Mậu enlisted the help of Khiêm following Tuyến's departure into exile. Mậu gained the cooperation of an assortment of military and civilian dissidents known as the Military and Civilian Front for the Revolution in Vietnam (MCFRV). The MCFRV started to plot independently in August, and was led by a cousin of Mậu.

Following the Xá Lợi Pagoda raids, the senior generals started their own plot in earnest. General Trần Văn Đôn, nominally a high-ranking general, but without command of troops because the palace distrusted him, was sought out by Mậu, who wanted to collaborate. Mậu later accompanied the ranking general in the plot, Dương Văn Minh, on recruitment campaigns. Despite his high rank, Minh was out of favour and served as the Presidential Military Advisor, a meaningless desk job where he had no subordinates in the field and no access to soldiers. Mậu helped Minh to secure the cooperation of General Nguyễn Khánh, who commanded the II Corps that oversaw the central highlands of the country, and Colonel Nguyễn Văn Thiệu, who commanded the 5th Division based just outside the capital Saigon in Biên Hòa. According to Thiệu, Mậu and Minh had promised to establish a more strongly anti-communist government, to expel Nhu and his wife, Madame Nhu, from the country and keep Diệm as a figurehead president. In October, the younger officers' plot was integrated into the generals' larger group, which was more likely to succeed, as Khiêm and Mậu were involved with both groups. The coup was successfully executed on 1 November 1963 under the leadership of Generals Minh and Đôn.

When the coup was about to take place, Mậu helped to get to weaken loyalist forces. Mậu concocted military intelligence reports with false data claiming the Viet Cong (VC) was massing outside the capital for an offensive. He then convinced Diệm and Nhu to send several companies of ARVN Special Forces personnel out of the capital to fight the VC. The United States had cut off funding for the CIA-trained Special Forces because Diệm used them to stop coups, repress dissidents and attack Buddhist pagodas in the capital instead of combating the communists in rural areas. Mậu's deception meant that what was effectively a private unit of the Ngô family would be unable to defend them.

Another of Diệm's younger brothers, Ngô Đình Cẩn, began to suspect Mậu and told the palace, which told army chief General Trần Thiện Khiêm to have Mậu arrested. However, Khiêm, also part of the plot, deliberately procrastinated and Mậu remained free. In the meantime, it was too late for the brothers to bring their loyalists back into the capital. Mậu helped to organise a lunchtime meeting at Joint General Staff Headquarters and invited senior officers to the event. At 13:45 on 1 November 1963, the coup was launched, and those who remained loyal to Diệm were arrested.

Mậu found himself on the opposite side to his nephew and Air Force Lieutenant Đỏ Thơ, Diệm's aide-de-camp. Late in the evening, Thơ accompanied the Ngô brothers as they escaped the rebel siege on Gia Long Palace and absconded to the home of a Chinese supporter in Cholon. The following day the brothers were captured and executed. Thơ died in action a few months later in a plane crash.

After the coup was successfully completed, the media learned about the conspiracy organised by Tuyến and Thảo which was more advanced than that of the generals before being integrated into the main plot. Đôn thought the younger officers had publicized their well-advanced plot in order to gain personal acclaim and distract attention from the generals' success, so he threatened to arrest them but Mậu intervened to protect them. Mậu was a principal tactician of the coup. He did not explicitly command troops, but had a thorough knowledge of the backgrounds of most of the ARVN officers and their strengths and weaknesses. This had allowed him to help recruit rebels, avoid loyalists and engineer the previous coup. The Military Revolutionary Council (MRC) of General Dương Văn Minh respected Mậu, but their fears about his shrewdness led them to place him in the relatively powerless post of Minister of Information, even though he was one of 12 members of the MRC. Mậu's closest aides were posted further away from any real power.

Mậu was mainly responsible for stifling anti-government sentiment. Saigon newspapers, which been able to operate liberally in the post-Diệm era, reported that the junta was paralysed because all twelve generals in the MRC had equal power. They strongly attacked Prime Minister Nguyễn Ngọc Thơ, accusing his civilian government of being "tools" of the MRC. They also questioned Thơ's activities under Diệm's presidency, accusing him of personally benefiting from corruption under Diệm's land policy. Mậu's ministry had already circulated a long list of topics which could not be reported. Thơ could no longer tolerate what was being reported about him. He called journalists into his office and assailed them for what he regarded as inaccurate, irresponsible and disloyal reporting. Thơ accused them of lying, and claimed one of the journalists was a communist while another was a drug addict. He said that his administration would "take steps to meet the situation" if the media did not behave responsibly. The next day Mậu's ministry closed down three newspapers for "disloyalty". During this time, Mậu enacted the "Golden Rules" to govern media conduct: Do not promote Communism or neutralism. Do not endanger national security or the army's morale. Do not spread false news of any kind. Do not slander individuals. Do not bolster vices.

== 1964 coup ==
Disgruntled, Mậu began recruiting for a coup against Minh's MRC, sounding out exiles in Cambodia and France as well as those who had returned after the overthrow of Diệm. Mậu started by targeting General Khánh, who was moved from II Corps to I Corps in the far north of South Vietnam. This, it was speculated, was to keep him far away from Saigon. This was contrary to Khánh's request for a transfer to the Mekong Delta close to Saigon. Khánh made no attempt to hide his anger at not being given a more important job by the MRC. Khánh had long been regarded as an ambitious and unscrupulous officer by his colleagues, and he had a reputation for switching sides in high-level disputes for personal gain.

The most important link in Mậu's plan was Colonel Nguyễn Chánh Thi, the former paratroop commander who had fled to Cambodia in the wake of the failed 1960 coup attempt against Diệm. Mậu persuaded the junta to install Thi as Khánh's deputy in I Corps. He tricked the junta into doing so by reasoning that Khánh had largely been responsible for putting down the 1960 revolt and that Thi would be an ideal mechanism for keeping Khánh in check, whom they distrusted. Privately, Mậu predicted Thi would be a bridge between him in Saigon and Khánh in Huế. Mậu recruited General Trần Thiện Khiêm, who had worked with him during the November 1963 coup. Khiêm had assisted Diệm in putting down the 1960 plot and had since been demoted from being Chief of Staff of the ARVN to the commander of the III Corps that surrounded Saigon following Diệm's fall. Khiêm joined the plot and controlled the divisions surrounding the capital. Khiêm, Khánh and Mậu kept in touch surreptitiously on a regular basis, supplementing their forces with an assortment of Marine, Air Force and Special Forces officers. Mậu recruited the chief of the Civil Guard, Dương Ngọc Lắm who was under investigation by the junta for swindling military funds, and General Dương Văn Đức, who had recently returned from Paris and was an assistant to General Lê Văn Kim, the chief of the junta's general staff.

At the time, there was innuendo that some generals in the MRC would become neutralist and stop fighting the communists, and that they were plotting with French president Charles de Gaulle, who supported such a solution in order to remove the US presence. Đức used his French experience to concoct some plausible sounding and incriminating documents for Mậu, which purported to show that some junta members were French agents. Some of the documents were leaked to some senior American officials. In January 1964, troops led by Khánh, Khiêm, and Thi overthrew the MRC in a bloodless coup. Khánh assumed control of a new junta, and Mậu was one three Deputy Prime Ministers, overseeing social and cultural affairs.
