= Nguyễn Ngọc Loan =

Vietnamese police chief (1930–1998)

- Loan in 1976
- Born: December 11, 1930; Huế, French Indochina
- Died: July 14, 1998 (aged 67); Burke, Virginia, U.S.
- Education: Huế University
- Military career
- Allegiance: State of Vietnam (1951–1955); South Vietnam (1955–1975)
- Branch: Vietnamese National Army; Republic of Vietnam Air Force; Republic of Vietnam National Police
- Service years: 1951–1975
- Rank: Major general
- Conflicts: Vietnam War; Tet Offensive; Fall of Saigon

Nguyễn Ngọc Loan (Vietnamese: [ŋʷǐənˀ ŋâwkp lʷāːn]; 11 December 1930 – 14 July 1998) was a South Vietnamese general and chief of the South Vietnamese National Police.

Loan gained international attention when he summarily executed a handcuffed prisoner named Lê Công Nà on February 1, 1968, in Saigon, Vietnam during the Tet Offensive. South Vietnamese Vice President Nguyễn Cao Kỳ stated that the man was "a very high ranking" political official, but had not been a member of the Viet Cong military. The event was witnessed and recorded by Võ Sửu, a cameraman for NBC, and Eddie Adams, an Associated Press photographer. The photo and film became two famous images in contemporary American journalism.

Despite the determination of the Immigration and Naturalization Service that Loan committed war crimes, owing to which he was liable for deportation back to Vietnam, the then US President Jimmy Carter intervened personally to halt the deportation proceedings.

== Early life ==
Nguyễn Ngọc Loan was born 11 December 1930 to a middle-class family in Huế and was one of eleven children. He studied pharmacy and graduated near the top of his class at Huế University before joining the Vietnamese National Army in 1951. He soon studied at an officer training school, where he befriended classmate Nguyễn Cao Kỳ. Loan received pilot training in Morocco before returning to Vietnam in 1955, serving with the Republic of Vietnam Air Force (RVNAF) for the next decade.

Loan received additional training in the United States at some time during this period, enabling him to speak English fluently by the time he became prominent during the late 1960s. Loan's career followed Ky's, and when Ky became commander of the RVNAF, Loan served as chief of staff. During the February 1965 Operation Flaming Dart airstrikes targeting North Vietnam Loan flew as Ky's wingman.

== Career ==
In June 1965, when Ky became premier of South Vietnam, he promoted Loan to colonel and appointed him director of the Military Security Service. This was followed within a few months by an appointment to director of the Central Intelligence Office, giving Loan simultaneous control of both military intelligence and security. He was further made director general of the Republic of Vietnam National Police in April 1966. Having these positions enabled Loan to wield immense power, and he supervised the suppression of the early 1966 uprising of Ky's rival General Nguyễn Chánh Thi and dissident Buddhists. When Ky agreed to become vice president for President Nguyễn Văn Thiệu in 1967, the former relied on the assistance Loan provided for him in order to retain power.

Loan was a staunch South Vietnamese nationalist, refusing to give Americans special treatment in his jurisdiction. For example, in December 1966 he rejected the arrest of Saigon mayor Van Van Cua by American military police and insisted that only South Vietnamese authorities could arrest and detain South Vietnamese citizens. He also insisted that U.S. civilians, including journalists, were subject to South Vietnamese jurisdiction while in Saigon. Loan's uncompromising stand caused him to be regarded as a troublemaker by the Presidency of Lyndon B. Johnson. Loan was also skeptical of the U.S. CIA-backed Phoenix Program to attack and neutralize the clandestine VC infrastructure.

Loan's men were also involved with the arrest of two VC operatives on 15 August 1967 who had been engaged with attempting peace negotiations with U.S. officials without the participation of the South Vietnamese in an initiative code-named Buttercup. His opposition to such surreptitious dealing, and his opposition to releasing one of the communist negotiators, reportedly angered the Americans, and forced them to keep both him and the South Vietnamese better informed of diplomatic dealings involving their country.

Loan was an accomplished pilot—he commanded an airstrike on VC forces at Bù Đốp in 1967, soon before he was promoted to permanent brigadier general rank. The Americans were displeased at his promotion, and Loan submitted his resignation soon thereafter. The South Vietnamese cabinet subsequently rejected Loan's resignation.

=== Execution of Bảy Lốp ===
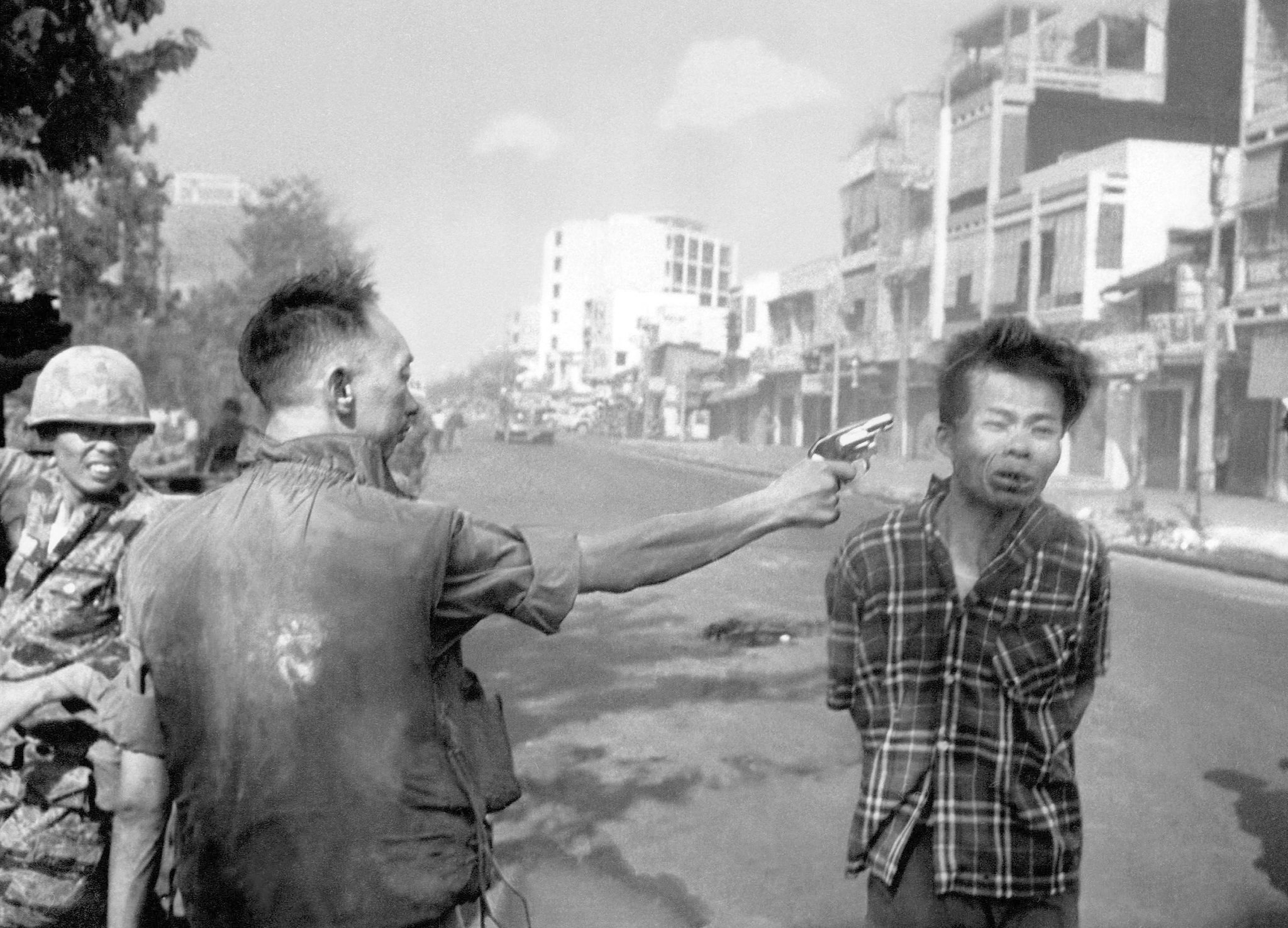
The Saigon Execution photograph of Loan summarily executing Lê Công Nà

On 1 February 1968, during the Tet Offensive, a Viet Cong in civilian clothing was captured in a building in the Cho Lon quarter of Saigon, near the Ấn Quang pagoda. The man was long believed to have been an officer of a sapper (special attack) unit named Nguyễn Văn Lém, a.k.a. Bảy Lốp, but historian Erik Villard has found evidence suggesting that the man was actually Lê Công Nà, a Communist Party political operative and a member of the Saigon Gia Dinh Party Committee. Handcuffed, Bảy Lốp was brought to Loan, who then summarily executed him on the street using his sidearm, a .38 Special Smith & Wesson Bodyguard Model 49 revolver. A reporter for The New York Times later wrote that this likely violated the Geneva Conventions.

A story emerged during the 1980s that the deceased had just murdered a police major, a subordinate and close friend of General Loan, and the major's whole family. The photographer Eddie Adams believed and repeated this story. "It turns out that the Viet Cong lieutenant who was killed in the picture had murdered a police major—one of General Loan's best friends—his whole family, wife, kids, the same guy. So these are things we didn't know at the time." "I didn't have a picture of that Viet Cong blowing away the family." In 2008, a new version appeared, in which Lém had murdered the family of Lieutenant Colonel Nguyễn Tuấn, who was not a subordinate of General Loan but an officer of the armored forces of the ARVN. Only one of Lt. Col. Tuan's children, Huan Nguyen, survived the attack and later became the first Vietnamese American promoted to rear admiral in the United States Navy. Max Hastings also wrote that American historian Edwin Moise (a Peace Corps teacher during the war) "is convinced that the entire story of Lém murdering the Tuân family is a post-war invention". Hastings concluded that "the truth will never be known".

Interviewed by Oriana Fallaci in May 1968 for her book Nothing, and So be it, he stated that he was aware of the indignation he caused and that he understood Fallaci's opinion when she regarded him as a cold-blooded killer. He said that he killed Lém because he felt enraged that the VC were wearing civilian clothes. Speaking to Fallaci, he said: "He wasn't wearing a uniform and I can't respect a man who shoots without wearing a uniform. Because it's too easy: you kill and you're not recognized. I respect a North Vietnamese because he's dressed as a soldier, like myself, and so he takes the same risks as I do. But a Vietcong in civilian clothes – I was filled with rage." Loan has also recounted, "If you hesitate, if you didn't do your duty, the men won't follow you".

The execution was captured as a photo by Associated Press photographer Eddie Adams and on video by NBC News television cameraman Võ Sửu. After the execution, Loan told Adams: "They killed many of our people and many of yours." Võ Sửu reported that after the shooting Loan went to a reporter and said "These guys kill a lot of our people, and I think Buddha will forgive me."

The photograph and footage were broadcast worldwide, allegedly increasing anti-war sentiment. Eddie Adams' photo won him the 1969 Pulitzer Prize for Spot News Photography. Adams later stated he regretted he was unable to get a picture "of that Viet Cong [the deceased] blowing away the [Tuan] family".

=== Subsequent career ===
A few months after the execution picture was taken, Loan was wounded seriously near Saigon by machine gun fire to his right leg. Again, his picture was published by the world press, this time as Australian war correspondent Pat Burgess carried him back to his lines.

On 8 June 1968 President Thiệu replaced Loan as Director of National Police with Trần Văn Hai. In late June he went to Australia for medical treatment, returning to Vietnam later that year. In May 1969 he and his family flew to the US where he received medical treatment at Walter Reed Army Medical Center and remained in Alexandria, Virginia until December 1969 when they returned to Vietnam. Soon after his arrival in the US Adams was awarded the Pulitzer Prize for his photo and this brought attention to Loan. Senator Stephen M. Young denounced Loan in the Senate calling him a "brutal murderer".

In August 1970 he was appointed to a Defense Ministry job that involved long-range planning but lacked actual power. Loan helped construct hospitals for war wounded and was a frequent visitor to children's hospitals and orphanages. His leg wound continued to trouble him and it was amputated in September 1974.

== Later life ==
In 1975, during the fall of Saigon, Loan approached the US Embassy for evacuation, but was refused, and he and his family escaped aboard an RVNAF airplane and eventually reached the US. There he moved to Dale City, Virginia. He then opened a restaurant named "Les Trois Continents" in the Washington, D.C. suburb of Burke, Virginia at Rolling Valley Mall. The restaurant served pizza, hamburgers, and Vietnamese cuisine, but was described as more of a pizzeria. Loan also worked as a secretary in a Washington company at this time. When interviewed, Loan stated "All we want to do is to forget and to be left alone".

Adams later apologized in person to Loan and his family for the damage his photograph did to his reputation.

House of Representatives member Elizabeth Holtzman forwarded a list of Vietnamese officials who may have committed war crimes (including Loan) to Immigration and Naturalization Service (INS). House of Representatives member Harold S. Sawyer later requested the Library of Congress investigate Loan. In 1978, the INS contended that Loan had committed a war crime, following a report by the Library of Congress which concluded that the summary execution of Nguyễn Văn Lém had been illegal by Vietnamese law, in an attempt to revoke his permanent resident status to ensure that he could not become a United States citizen. They approached Adams to testify against Loan, but Adams instead testified in his favor and Loan was allowed to stay. The deportation was halted by the intervention of United States President Jimmy Carter, who stated that "such historical revisionism was folly".

Loan visited the Vietnam Veterans Memorial and praised it.

In 1991, Loan closed his restaurant and retired after a decrease of business caused by increased publicity about his past. Adams recalled that on his last visit to the pizza parlor soon before it closed, he had seen written on a toilet wall, "We know who you are, you fucker".

== Death ==
Nguyễn Ngọc Loan died of cancer on 14 July 1998, aged 67, in Burke, Virginia. After his death, Adams praised him: "The guy was a hero. America should be crying. I just hate to see him go this way, without people knowing anything about him."

Adams wrote a eulogy to Loan in Time:

The general killed the Viet Cong; I killed the general with my camera. Still photographs are the most powerful weapon in the world. People believe them, but photographs do lie, even without manipulation. They are only half-truths. What the photograph didn't say was, "What would you do if you were the general at that time and place on that hot day, and you caught the so-called bad guy after he blew away one, two or three American soldiers?".

== Personal life ==
Loan was married to Chinh Mai, with whom he raised five children.
