= Trần Văn Hai =

South Vietnamese officer (1927–1975)

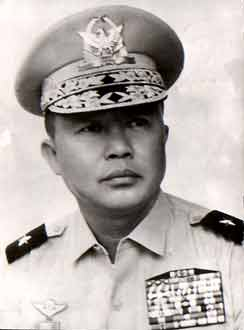

Brigadier General Trần Văn Hai (1927 – April 30, 1975) was an officer in the Army of the Republic of Vietnam. He was born in Cần Thơ.

== Military service ==
In 1951, Hai graduated from the Dalat Military Academy, Class 7.

In May 1968, he was commanding the Ranger Branch Command, directly supervising the Ranger operations to clear Vietcong (VC) forces that infiltratedthe Chợ Lớn area in the May Offensive. On 2 June Hai was onboard a United States Army UH-1 gunship that was firing rockets at VC positions. One of the rockets misfired and hit a South Vietnamese command group at the Thuong Phuoc High School, killing Saigon police chief Lieutenant colonel Nguyễn Van Luân, port director of Saigon Lieutenant Colonel Pho Quoc Chu, 5th Ranger Group commander Nguyễn Van Phuoc and 4 other officers, all allies of Prime minister Nguyễn Cao Kỳ. Kỳ was supposed to be present but cancelled; the attack gave rise to rumours that this was an attempt by President Nguyễn Văn Thiệu to assassinate his political rival Kỳ.

On 8 June 1968 Thiệu appointed him as director general of the Republic of Vietnam National Police, replacing Nguyễn Ngọc Loan. During the next week he replaced seven of Saigon's nine district police chiefs.

He was the commander of the 7th Division at Dong Tam, near Mỹ Tho.

In 1970, he was commander of the Special Tactical Area 44, before commanding the 7th Division. He was renowned for being incorruptible, outspoken and brave.

== Death ==
On April 30, 1975, at midnight he committed suicide at the Division Headquarters, Đồng Tâm Base Camp. His motives are unknown, but according to The New York Times, General Hai feared persecution due to the humiliation of surrendering to VC divisions outside at the NH4 (now National Route 1A). General Hai is one of the five ARVN generals who committed suicide to avoid a humiliating surrender to VC/NVA soldiers.
