= Linh Quang Viên =

South Vietnamese commander (1918–2013)

Linh Quang Viên (November 11, 1918 – January 17, 2013) was a Vietnamese soldier who rose to the rank of Lieutenant General in the Army of the Republic of Vietnam.

Vien was born in Cao Bang, northern Vietnam. He attended Albert Sarraut High School in Hanoi, and graduated in 1939.

In 1958, he graduated from the Command and General Staff College, [Fort Leavenworth], Kansas. He served in the Army of the Republic of Vietnam (ARVN) and rose to the rank of Lieutenant General, Chief of Staff Inter-armed Forces (Tham Muu truong Lien Quan). In 1964 he commanded the 22nd Division. He participated in many military cabinets between 1965 and 1974 during the various military junta's leadership after the deposal of President Ngo Dinh Diem. Was Political Commissar in the Armed Forces Council (Uy Vien Chinh Tri Hoi Dong Quan Luc), Head of the Central Intelligence Directorate (Phu Dac Uy Trung Uong Tinh Bao), Minister of Information (Tong Truong Thong Tin), Minister of National Security (Tong Truong An Ninh Quoc Gia), and also Interior Minister (Tong Truong Noi Vu) for a short time.

In 1974, he retired from the South Vietnamese Armed Forces, but was soon appointed Ambassador to the Central Africa Republic and Chad. He remained at these posts until the fall of Saigon in 1975. He was then offered asylum by France, went to Paris and stayed there until 1978 when he immigrated to the US, where he settled in Virginia.

For many years, he was actively involved in several political and community activities within the Vietnamese community in Virginia, including association with the Vietnamese National Congress (Nghi Hoi), the Movement for the Support of the Liberation of Vietnam (Phong Trao Yem Tro Khang Chien), and the Government of Free Vietnam (Chinh Phu Viet Nam Tu Do).
