= Nguyễn Hữu Có =

South Vietnamese military officer and politician (1925–2012)

First Deputy Chairman of the Central Executive Committee of South Vietnam (First Deputy Prime Minister)
- In office 1 October 1965 – 27 January 1967 Serving with Nguyễn Lưu Viên
- Chairman of the Central Executive Committee: Nguyễn Cao Kỳ
- Preceded by: Trần Văn Đỗ; Trần Văn Tuyên
- Succeeded by: Phạm Đăng Lâm

Minister of National Defense
- In office 21 June 1965 – 27 January 1967
- Prime Minister: Nguyễn Cao Kỳ
- Preceded by: Nguyễn Văn Thiệu
- Succeeded by: Cao Văn Viên

Personal details
- Born: 23 February 1925 Mỹ Tho, Tiền Giang Province, French Indochina
- Died: 3 July 2012 (aged 87) Ho Chi Minh City, Vietnam
- Party: National Revolutionary Movement (1956–63); National Social Democratic Front (Big tent affiliation, 1967–75); Vietnamese Motherland Front (1994–2012)
- Other political affiliations: Military (1963–67)
- Spouse: Nguyễn Thị Tín
- Children: 12

Military service
- Allegiance: Republic of Vietnam
- Branch/service: Vietnamese National Army; Army of the Republic of Vietnam
- Years of service: 1943–1967
- Rank: Lieutenant general
- Battles/wars: 1963 South Vietnamese coup

Nguyễn Hữu Có ([ŋwiəŋ˨˩˦ hɨw˨˩˦ kɔ˦˥] ng'weeng-heew-koh; 23 February 1925 – 3 July 2012) was a South Vietnamese soldier and politician who served in the Army of the Republic of Vietnam, rising to the rank of lieutenant general. He was prominent in several coups and juntas in the 1960s.

In 1963, Có came to prominence for his role in the November coup that deposed Vietnam's president, Ngô Đình Diệm, who was assassinated. Có's superior, General Tôn Thất Đính, moved him into command of the 7th Division to lock loyalist forces out of Saigon. Có was promoted to brigadier general after the coup, and as South Vietnam was inflicted with a cycle of coups over the next two years, he became more prominent as other generals defeated one another in power struggles.

By 1965, Có was the Deputy Prime Minister and Defense Minister in a junta headed by Prime Minister and Air Marshal Nguyễn Cao Kỳ and General Nguyễn Văn Thiệu, the figurehead chief of state. Có came under increasing scrutiny for his exorbitant wealth and was widely seen as corrupt, while Kỳ viewed him as a political threat. In 1967 Kỳ fired Có when both men were overseas on diplomatic visits. Kỳ then organized military forces to prevent Có from flying back, effectively sending him into exile. Over time, Thiệu began to eclipse Kỳ in a power struggle, and allowed Có to return in 1970. Có then stayed out of public life, and worked in banking and business. In 1975, the communists overran the south, and after hesitating in planning his escape from South Vietnam, Có was captured by the communists, who imprisoned him in re-education camps for 12 years. Có decided not to emigrate after being released and lived in Vietnam until his death in 2012.

== Early career ==
Có was a field commander for the French-backed Vietnamese National Army that fought against Hồ Chí Minh's Việt Minh during the First Indochina War. He led a "groupement mobile".

== Diem overthrow ==
He was a participant in the 1963 coup that deposed President Ngô Đình Diệm and ended in his assassination. Colonel Có was the deputy of General Tôn Thất Đính, who commanded the III Corps forces that oversaw the region surrounding the capital Saigon. Đính was entrusted to command III Corps because the Ngô family trusted him to defend them in the face of any coup attempts. However, in late 1963, Đính began to plot against Diệm along with a group of generals.

As part of the generals' plot, Đính sent Colonel Có to Mỹ Tho to talk to the 7th Division commander, Colonel Bùi Đình Đạm, and two regimental commanders, the armoured unit commander, both of the 7th Division, and the Mỹ Tho provincial chief. At that time, the 7th Division was under the control of the IV Corps that was commanded by Diệm loyalist General Cao. This division was on the outskirts of Saigon and its stance would be critical in determining the success or failure of a coup. Exhorting the 7th Division officers to join the coup on the grounds that the Diệm regime was unable to keep the military going forward, he stated that all the generals except Cao were in the plot, while Đính was going to do so. According to one account, Đính had intended that loyalists would report Có's activities to Diệm and Nhu so that it would give him an opportunity to orchestrate a stunt to ingratiate himself with the palace and make the coup easier to carry out.

Nhu's agents heard of the conversation and reported to the palace. When the Ngô brothers confronted with the report of what had happened in Mỹ Tho, Đính feigned astonishment at his deputy's behavior. He began crying and said "This is my fault, because you have suspected me. I have not really gone to work for the last 15 days but have stayed at home because I was sad. But I am not against you. I was sad because I thought I was discredited with you. So Nguyen Huu Co profited from my absence to make trouble." Đính claimed to know nothing of Có's activities and raised his voice, vowing to have his deputy killed. Nhu opposed this and said he wanted keep Có alive to catch the plotters, and tried to use Đính to achieve this. Nhu ordered Đính to plan a fake coup against the Ngô family. One of Nhu's objectives was to trick dissidents into joining the false uprising so that they could be identified and eliminated.

Đính was put in charge of the fake coup and was allowed the additional control of the 7th Division, giving his III Corps complete encirclement of Saigon. This would prevent Cao from storming the capital to save Diệm as he had done during the 1960 coup attempt. Not trusting Có, Diệm put a Catholic loyalist, Colonel Lâm Văn Phát, in command of the 7th Division on 31 October. According to tradition, Phát had to pay the corps commander a courtesy visit before assuming control of the division. Đính refused to see Phát and told him to come back on Friday at 14:00, by which time the real coup had already been scheduled to start. In the meantime, Đính had General Trần Văn Đôn sign a counter-order transferring command of the 7th Division to Có.

With a group of his personal rebel officers, Có flew by helicopter to My Thơ, the division headquarters, to take command on the morning of the coup, 1 November. Reaching the Mekong Delta town two hours before the scheduled start of the coup, he held a ceremony for the division's incumbent officers—who thought the change of command was a routine matter — in a local hall. When the coup started, Có's men charged through the doors with automatic guns and arrested the officers, before taking command. He said "Please remain seated quietly. Anyone who rises will be instantly shot".

Có then telephoned Cao, further south in the Mekong Delta's largest town Cần Thơ, where the IV Corps was headquartered. The rebel colonel assured Cao that the divisional and corps transfer had taken place smoothly. Có, a central Vietnamese, was afraid that Cao, a Mekong Delta native would recognise his fake southern accent, and realise that he was impersonating Phát, another southerner. However, Cao did not notice the faked accent. When Cao was informed by his subordinates that there was a coup occurring in the capital, he believed in to be part of the false coup, as he had been told beforehand by Nhu; Cao was one of the regime's most loyal and favourites generals and he was going to help stage the second part of Nhu's plan. However, Cao did tell one regiments and a few tanks to ready themselves for the second part of the plot. Late during the night of the coup, Cao realised the coup was genuine.

He sent the 9th Division under Colonel Bùi Dzinh to move north through Mỹ Tho towards Saigon to save Diệm but Có had already made plans to cut off any attempt by Cao to relieve Saigon. When Cao radioed the 7th Division in Mỹ Tho, Có identified himself and taunted the corps commander, saying "Didn't you recognise my accent?". Có told the general that he had ordered all the ferries to the Saigon side of the Mekong River, and told Cao not to attempt to cross unless he wanted to die.

Seeing that Diệm was lost, Cao expressed solidarity with the coup. After the coup succeeded, Có became a general in the ruling Military Revolutionary Council (MRC). Có said that Diệm "made so many mistakes", most notably his strong preferential treatment of Roman Catholics, usually from his native central Vietnam, at the expense of Buddhists. Diệm had generally promoted military officers on loyalty, rather than merit.

== Junta ==
The MRC led by General Dương Văn Minh was deposed in a January 1964 coup by General Nguyễn Khánh, and he put several leading generals — Trần Văn Đôn, Tôn Thất Đính and Mai Hữu Xuân — in jail, but Có was not affected. South Vietnam had a series of short-lived juntas, including military-supervised civilian cabinets over the next 18 months.

In August 1964, Khánh tried to give himself more power, but this provoked strong protests and forced him to back down into a weaker position than before, and his rule became unstable as more concessions were demanded. Khánh promised to dissolve the junta and create a National Assembly within a year. The division among the generals came to a head at a meeting of the junta on 26/27 August, as they blamed each other's policies and machinations for the problems. Thiệu and Có called for the replacement of Khánh with Minh, but the latter refused. Minh reportedly claimed that Khánh was the only one who would get funding from Washington, so they supported him, prompting angry arguments as to whether Khánh was a puppet. After more arguing between the senior officers, they agreed that Khánh, Minh, and Khiệm would rule as a triumvirate for two months, until a new civilian government could be formed. However, the triumvirate did little due to their disunity. Khánh dominated the decision-making and sidelined Khiệm and Minh.

In January 1965, the junta-appointed Prime Minister Trần Văn Hương introduced a series of measures to expand the military and war effort, most notably by widening the terms of conscription. This provoked widespread anti-Huong demonstrations and riots, mainly from conscription-aged students and pro-negotiations Buddhists. Reliant on Buddhist support, Khánh decided to have the armed forces take over, removing Hương on 27 January. Khánh removed Hương in a bloodless coup with the support of Thi and Kỳ. He promised to leave politics once the situation was stabilized and hand over power to a civilian body. It was believed that some of the officers supported Khánh's increased power so that it would give him an opportunity to fail and be removed permanently.

Khánh's deposal of the prime minister nullified a counter-plot involving Hương which developed during the civil disorders that forced him from office. In an attempt to preempt his being deposed, Hương had backed a plot led by some Đại Việt-oriented Catholic officers reported to include Generals Có and Thiệu. They planned to remove Khánh and bring Khiệm back from Washington. The U.S. Embassy in Saigon was privately supportive of the aim, but was not ready to fully back the move as they regarded it as poorly thought out and potentially a political embarrassment due to the need to use an American plane to transport some plotters, including Khiệm, between Saigon and Washington. As a result, they only promised asylum for Hương if necessary.

By this time, the U.S. relationship with Khánh had broken down, and the U.S. became more intent on a regime change as Khánh was reliant on Buddhist support, which they saw as an obstacle to an expansion of the war. In the first week of February, Taylor told the leading officers that the US was "in no way propping up General Khánh or backing him in any fashion".

At this stage, the U.S. Embassy thought highly of three officers as possible replacements for Khánh: Thiệu, Có the commander of II Corps and Admiral Chung Tấn Cang, Commander of the Republic of Vietnam Navy. A U.S. Defense Department report stated that Có was an "outstanding officer ... friendly to Americans". At the same time, the CIA knew that Có had become disillusioned with Khánh and had stopped attending junta meetings after Khánh accused him of "having been bought off by the Americans".

However, the relatively cautious Thiệu, Có and Cang's preparations were well behind those of Colonel Phạm Ngọc Thảo, a communist double agent. Có and the other American-preferred officers maintained a guarded approach, waiting to see what others would do, rather than boldly taking the initiative, and Thảo struck first. The Americans opposed Thảo, and with their support, Kỳ and Thi defeated the coup and then overthrew Khánh as well, becoming the most important officers in the resulting junta. In mid-1965, Air Marshal Nguyễn Cao Kỳ became prime minister and General Thiệu as the figurehead president. They headed a 10-man junta of which Có was a part until elections were held in 1967. Có was the Deputy Prime Minister and Defense Minister.

Có was generally regarded as being corrupt. As a general, he had a base pay of US$177 monthly, but he managed to purchase three villas in Saigon and owned property estimated at US$600,000 near Tan Son Nhut Air Base on the capital's outskirts. His wealth was believed to have come from bribes from subordinate officers who wanted postings away from danger, usually desk jobs, as well as charging up to US$3,400 a head for draft evaders, depending on how rich they were. Có was also accused of using his position as defense minister to pocket the rent collected from the American military for building U.S. bases on land rented from the Saigon government. His wife was known to be a gambling addict during his halcyon days and was reputed to have once lost US$8,500 in one outing.

Có was seen as a political threat to Kỳ and a magnet for dissidents. For his part, Có deemed Kỳ to be "immature". In early 1967, Kỳ sent Có to Taiwan, ostensibly to represent the junta at a ceremony to opening direct air services from Taipei to Saigon. In the meantime, Kỳ made a state visit to Australia. With Có out of the country and unable to stage a coup, and Kỳ not within striking distance in case anyone wanted to capture him, news of Có's removal was broken in Saigon on 25 January. Có expressed a desire to return to Saigon, but was threatened with arrest and trial, and soldiers were deployed to the airport. Có spent three years in exile in Hong Kong. When President Thiệu sidelined Kỳ from real power, he allowed Có to return to South Vietnam in 1970. Có stayed away from politics and worked as a commercial banker and then as a businessman.

== Imprisonment and later life ==
On 30 April 1975, Saigon fell and the communists took control. Có made plans to leave but hesitated and was not evacuated by the US military. He considered leaving by boat, but deemed it too risky with 11 children. In June 1975, Có was told to report to a re-education camp along with the vast majority of public servants and military officers.

Có was initially held at Quang Trung National Training Center, about 15 km north of Saigon, which had been an ARVN training center for newly enlisted men. According to him, the conditions were good, although there were political propaganda lectures. In June 1976, he was suddenly moved by an airplane in the middle of the night to Yên Bái in the north of the country where he was forced to perform manual labor. In 1978, he and some other ARVN generals were relocated to Hà Tây, in the Red River Delta east of the capital Hanoi, where he was imprisoned in an Interior Ministry facility, where he was asked to write what he knew about South Vietnam's military strategies and government mechanisms.

In 1979, Có was moved by himself to Nam Ha, where he underwent propaganda lessons and did manual labor alongside military and civilian prisoners. He was returned to Hà Tây to be reunited with the other generals. In 1983 he was moved back to Nam Ha, where he stayed until his release in 1987, after 12 years in captivity. While he was imprisoned, his wife, who had always been a housewife, took her first job, in a knitting factory to support their children. Có decided to remain in Vietnam under communist rule after being released. In 2012, he died at his home in Ho Chi Minh City after a six-year battle with diabetes.

== Awards and decorations ==
- South Vietnam :
  - Commander of the National Order of Vietnam
  - Army Distinguished Service Order, First Class
