= Nguyễn Chánh Thi =

South Vietnamese Army officer

- Born: 23 February 1923; Huế, Annam, French Indochina
- Died: 23 June 2007 (aged 84) Lancaster, Pennsylvania, US
- Allegiance: French Union; State of Vietnam; Republic of Vietnam
- Branch: French Union Forces (1940–1949); Vietnamese National Army (1949–1954); Army of the Republic of Vietnam (1954–1966)
- Service years: 1940–1966
- Rank: Lieutenant general (Trung Tướng)
- Commands: Airborne Brigade (1955–1960); 1st Division (1964); I Corps (1964–1966)
- Conflicts: Battle of Saigon (1955); 1960 South Vietnamese coup attempt; 1963 South Vietnamese coup d'état; January 1964 South Vietnamese coup; September 1964 South Vietnamese coup attempt; February 1965 South Vietnamese coup attempt; Buddhist Uprising

Nguyễn Chánh Thi ([ŋwiəŋ˨˦ c̻an˦ˀ˥ tʰi˧˥]; 23 February 1923 – 23 June 2007) was an officer in the Army of the Republic of Vietnam (ARVN). He is best known for being involved in frequent coups in the 1960s and wielding substantial influence as a key member of various juntas that ruled South Vietnam from 1964 until 1966, when he was overpowered by Republic of Vietnam Air Force chief and Prime Minister Nguyễn Cao Kỳ in a power struggle and exiled to the United States. Known for his flamboyant style and hostility to US advice, Thi's ousting was supported by the American leadership, who backed Kỳ's pro-US regime.

Thi joined the French Army at the age of 17 and was captured by Japan after they invaded French Indochina during World War II. After several months, he escaped and later transferred to the Vietnamese National Army of the French-backed State of Vietnam, which, in October 1955, became the ARVN and Republic of Vietnam (South Vietnam), respectively. A paratrooper, he fought for then-Prime Minister Ngô Đình Diệm against the Bình Xuyên organized crime syndicate in the 1955 Battle for Saigon. Impressed by Thi's performance, Diệm referred to him as his own "son" and put him in command of the Airborne Brigade.

In November 1960, Thi led the paratroopers in a coup against Diệm, citing political interference in the military. The rebels gained the upper hand but Thi was reluctant to push for a complete victory, and the coup was defeated after Diệm falsely promised to make reforms in order to buy time for loyalists to rescue him. Thi fled into exile in Cambodia, but returned after Diệm was deposed and executed in November 1963. He became the deputy commander of the I Corps under Nguyễn Khánh, and helped his superior to overthrow Diệm's subjugators three months later. Thi became the commander of the 1st Division, before taking control of I Corps later in the year.

During the year after Khánh's rise to power, Thi helped Khánh stage or put down several coup attempts, making him a key player in South Vietnamese military politics. In September 1964, he and Kỳ helped rescue Khánh from a coup attempt by two disgruntled Catholic pro-Diệm generals, Lâm Văn Phát and Dương Văn Đức. This gave Kỳ and Thi increased leverage in the junta. Two months later, he was prominent in shutting down a junta-appointed civilian advisory body after they disapproved of a plan by younger officers to compulsorily retire old generals. In January 1965, he helped Khánh depose Prime Minister Trần Văn Hương, but by this time he had turned against Khánh. In February 1965, he helped defeat a coup attempt by Phát and Phạm Ngọc Thảo, and helped to force Khánh's resignation at the same time. Over the next year, Kỳ and Thi were the foremost officers in the junta, and in June 1965, Thi declined an opportunity to serve as prime minister after being nominated by his fellow officers following the resignation of Phan Huy Quát. Thi wanted to let a rival take the job and then step in after he had failed, but never received a second opportunity.

Thi oversaw I Corps with a great deal of autonomy, and the other officers felt threatened, which was accentuated by his alignment with Buddhist activist movements in his region, traditionally a Buddhist stronghold. The Buddhists were opposed to expansion of the Vietnam War and the American leadership viewed Thi negatively. In early 1966, feeling more confident about his hold on power, Kỳ orchestrated Thi's removal, and announced that Thi would be going to the US for medical treatment, but in reality into exile. Thi refused to go along with Kỳ's false story and wanted to stay in Vietnam, and this led to civil unrest in I Corps, where Thi was popular. The disquiet escalated into open rebellion by pro-Thi military units, allied to Buddhist anti-junta activists calling for civilian government and an end to the US-driven war expansion policy. After three months of virtual secession, Kỳ's forces quelled the dissidents, and Thi emigrated to the US, where he lived for the rest of his life.

== Early life ==
Thi was born on 23 February 1923 in Huế, then the capital of Vietnam and the seat of the Nguyễn dynasty. At the time, Vietnam was part of the colony of French Indochina and his father was a low-level mandarin in the French-controlled monarchy and had served in the French Army during World War I. Thi joined the French Army at 17; a few months later, Imperial Japan invaded Indochina during World War II, wresting control from France. Thi was a Japanese prisoner of war for several months until he escaped amidst the confusion of an Allied bombing raid on the Japanese military jail. According to family documents, Thi was captured and imprisoned by the communist Viet Minh of Ho Chi Minh for three months at the end of the war in 1945 as they declared independence during the August Revolution. At the time, a power vacuum emerged as the defeated Japanese withdrew from Vietnam. France attempted to reassert its colonial grip over Indochina, while various Vietnamese groups jockeyed for power at the head of an independent country. In 1946, full-scale conflict erupted between the Vietminh, who had declared the Democratic Republic of Vietnam (DRV) independent, and France. As part of their political effort, the French created the State of Vietnam (SoV), an associated state in the French Union, and installed former Emperor Bảo Đại as the head of state. Thi served in the SoV's Vietnamese National Army (VNA), and rose steadily up the ranks.

== Diệm era ==
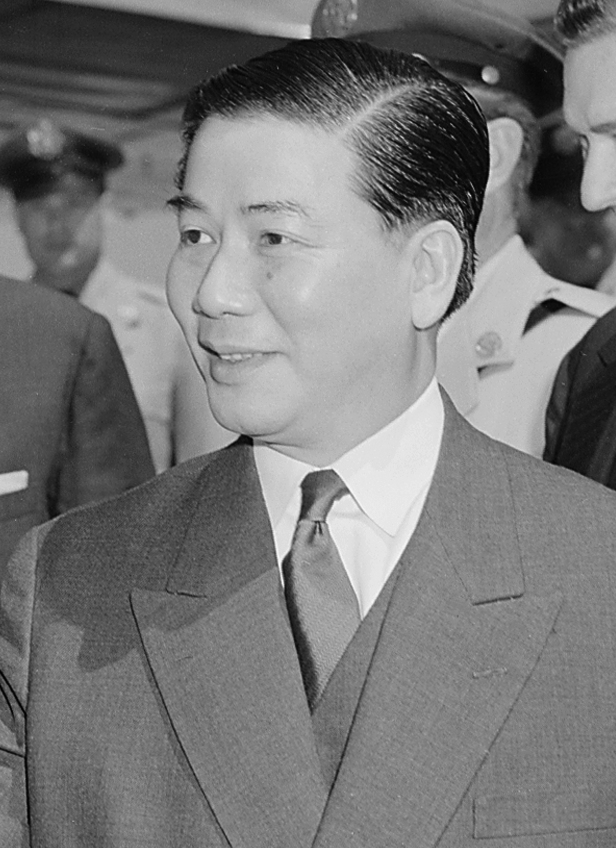
Ngô Đình Diệm, the President of South Vietnam from 1955 to 1963, referred to Thi as "my son".

In 1954, the Vietminh defeated the French Union forces at the Battle of Dien Bien Phu and France decided to withdraw from Vietnam. Under the provisions of the Geneva Accords, the Vietminh's DRV would take control of the northern half of the country, and the SoV the south, pending national reunification elections in 1956. In the meantime, the State of Vietnam remained unstable. The Cao Đài and Hòa Hảo religious sects had their own private armies and de facto states in the Mekong Delta, while the Bình Xuyên organized crime syndicate controlled the national police, had their own military, and dominated the rampant drug trade, prostitution and illegal gambling in the southern capital Saigon. In April and May 1955, Thi fought in VNA airborne units for Prime Minister Diệm against the Binh Xuyen in the Battle for Saigon after Diệm gave them an ultimatum to surrender. When they did not, the VNA attacked and decisively dispersed the Binh Xuyen after a few days of heavy street fighting. This performance so impressed the lifelong bachelor Diệm that he thereafter referred to Thi as his "son". Diệm promoted Thi to the rank of colonel and put him in charge of the Airborne Brigade, which was expanded into a division a few years later. The Central Intelligence Agency (CIA) was not as impressed. One of their reports described Thi as "an opportunist and a man lacking strong convictions". An American military advisor assessed Thi as "tough, unscrupulous, and fearless, but dumb". In October 1955, Diệm deposed Bảo Đại in a fraudulent referendum overseen by his brother Ngô Đình Nhu and declared himself President of the newly proclaimed Republic of Vietnam. The VNA thus became the Army of the Republic of Vietnam, and after Diệm canceled the reunification elections, the Vietnam War ensued.

== Failed coup against Diệm ==
In 1960, Thi led a revolt against Diệm after lobbying by his Airborne Division deputy commander, Lieutenant Colonel Vương Văn Đông. Đông had become discontented with Diệm's arbitrary rule and constant meddling in military affairs. Diệm, who promoted officers on religion and loyalty, rather than skill, gave orders directly to individual commanders, and played senior officers against one another in order to weaken the military leadership and prevent them from becoming effective, lest they try to challenge his rule. Đông later stated his sole objective was to force Diệm to improve the governance of the country. Đông was clandestinely supported by his brother-in-law, Lieutenant Colonel Nguyễn Triệu Hồng, and Hong's uncle, Hoang Co Thuy, members of the Việt Nam Quốc Dân Đảng (VNQDĐ, the Vietnamese Nationalist Party), which was an anti-communist political organization whose members had been marginalized by Diệm. The coup was organized with the help of some VNQDĐ and Đại Việt Quốc Dân Đảng (Nationalist Party of Greater Vietnam, known as Đại Việt) members, civilians and officers alike. Đông enlisted the cooperation of an armored regiment, a marine unit and three paratrooper battalions. The operation was launched on 11 November at 05:00. The coup was executed ineffectually; although the rebels captured the headquarters of the Joint General Staff at Tan Son Nhut Air Base, they failed to block the roads leading into Saigon and cut off loyalist reinforcements. Thi's men also failed to disconnect phone lines into the palace, which allowed Diệm to appeal for aid from loyal units. After taking the key military points, the paratroopers headed towards Independence Palace. At first, they did not attack, believing that Diệm would capitulate. Most of Thi's soldiers had been tricked into thinking that they were attacking in order to save Diệm from a Presidential Guard mutiny. When the attack finally started, Diệm was nearly killed in the opening salvoes when gunfire hit his bed, but he had arisen just a few minutes earlier. Despite their numerical advantage, the paratroopers' first assault was repelled by the loyalists. Thi and Dong held fire; they brought in reinforcements and attacked again, but the loyalists held firm. In the meantime, Thi's rebels had captured the national police offices, the studios of Radio Saigon and the Presidential Guard barracks. They had also put most of the Saigon-based generals under house arrest.

Apparently poised for a military victory, the rebels hesitated. Đông wanted to storm the palace and capture the president and his family. Thi felt that despite Diệm's shortcomings, he was South Vietnam's best available leader and thus was worried Diệm could be killed in an attack. Thi thought that enforced reform was the best outcome. The rebels wanted Nhu, Diệm's younger brother and chief advisor, and his wife, Madame Nhu, who were widely regarded as the powers behind Diệm's rule, out of the government, although they disagreed over whether to assassinate or deport the couple. Thi demanded that Diệm appoint an officer as Prime Minister and remove Madame Nhu from the palace. Saigon Radio broadcast a speech authorized by Thi's Revolutionary Council, claiming that Diệm was being removed for corruption and suppression of liberty. Worried by the uprising, Diệm sent representatives to negotiate. After lengthy talks, the parties agreed to a ceasefire. In the meantime, loyalist forces headed towards the capital. Diệm promised to end press censorship, liberalize the economy, and hold free and fair elections. Diệm refused to sack Nhu, but agreed to dissolve the cabinet and form a new government which would accommodate members of the Revolutionary Council. In the early hours of 12 November, Diệm taped a speech detailing the concessions, and Thi broadcast the message on Saigon Radio.

When the loyalist reinforcements rolled into the capital aboard tanks and armored vehicles and began to wrest the initiative, the rebels began to break. After a brief, violent battle that killed around 400 people, the coup attempt was crushed. The casualties included a large number of anti-Diệm civilians; Thi exhorted them to bring down the Ngô family by charging the palace; 13 were gunned down by the loyalist soldiers as they invaded the grounds. After the failed coup, Đông, Thi and other prominent officers fled to Tan Son Nhut and climbed aboard a C-47. They fled to Cambodia, where they were given asylum by Prince Norodom Sihanouk, a long-time Diệm opponent. Diệm promptly reneged on his promises, and intensified his authoritarian rule and crackdowns on dissidents. Almost three years after the incident, Diệm opened the trial for those involved in the coup on 8 July 1963. Thi and his fellow exiled officers were found guilty and sentenced to death in absentia. In the meantime, Thi lived self-sufficiently in Cambodia for three years.

== 1964 coups with Khánh ==
Diệm was killed in a November 1963 coup, allowing Thi to return to South Vietnam and resume his military service. Soon after arriving home, Thi found himself involved in another coup plot, acting as the link between Khánh and Đỗ Mậu, two generals disgruntled with their position under the military junta of Minh, who oversaw the overthrow of Diệm. Mau was one of the principal tacticians in the 1963 coup; although he did not command troops, he had a thorough knowledge of the backgrounds of the ARVN officers and their strengths, weaknesses and characteristics through his role as Diệm's director of military security, and this understanding had allowed him to engineer the previous coup. Minh's junta feared Mau's shrewdness and tried to sideline him by making him the Minister of Information, a relatively unimportant position.

Disgruntled, Mau began recruiting for a coup, targeting Khánh, who had been moved to the I Corps in the far north of South Vietnam to keep him far away from Saigon. Khánh made no attempt to hide his annoyance at not being given a more important job, and had long been regarded as an ambitious and unscrupulous officer by his colleagues. Mau persuaded the junta to install Thi as Khánh's deputy in I Corps. He tricked the junta by telling them that as Khánh had played a large part in putting down the 1960 coup attempt, Thi would still be harboring resentment. According to Mau, Thi would thus be an ideal mechanism for keeping the disliked Khánh in check. Privately, Mau predicted that Thi would act as a bridge between him in Saigon, and Khánh in Huế. He was correct in thinking the 1960 conflict would be irrelevant as allegiances shifted over time and that the pair would work together for their current aims.

The trio were joined by General Trần Thiện Khiêm, the disaffected commander of the III Corps that surrounded Saigon, and an assortment of Marine, Air Force and Special Forces officers and their units. Other notable recruits were Diem loyalist and former chief of the Civil Guard, Duong Ngoc Lam, who was under investigation for corruption, and General Đức, who had recently returned from exile in Paris. The cabal scheduled the coup for 04:00, 30 January. On 29 January, Thi followed Khánh to the capital. The plotters and their agents met in obscure locations spots around town. On the night of 29 January, the rebel troops assumed their positions around Saigon. A number of American officers and embassy officials were alerted to be in their offices at 2:00. At 03:00, Khánh took over the Joint General Staff Headquarters at Tan Son Nhut, and by dawn, the coup had succeeded without a shot being fired as Minh's junta was caught unaware. The popular Minh was allowed to stay on as a ceremonial but powerless head of state, but his colleagues were taken into custody. Nevertheless, Minh remained disgruntled and persistently tried to regain his influence through political means. On 2 February 1964, Thi was appointed to be commander of the 1st Division based in Huế, as part of I Corps. He stayed in the post until 21 October and on 14 November, he took control of the entire corps. This corps oversaw the five northernmost provinces of central Vietnam and the 1st and 2nd Divisions.

=== Defeating the September 1964 coup ===
In August, Khánh gave himself more powers, provoking widespread riots and demonstrations across the nation, with Buddhist activists prominent in expressing opposition against Khánh. The anarchy forced Khánh to back down and make concessions, and he ended up in a weaker position than before. Among the concessions he made was to remove or demote some Catholic officials who had been close to Diệm's religiously discriminatory rule, angering the minority Catholic community. Among those demoted were Generals Phát and Đức, both Catholic. They launched a coup attempt backed mainly by Catholic elements against Khánh before dawn on 13 September. They took over the city without firing a shot, and used the national radio station to proclaim the deposing of Khánh's junta. There was little initial reaction from most of the military commanders, including Thi.

However, Phát and Đức could not apprehend Khánh, and the Americans decided to support the incumbent after concluding that the rebels did not have a satisfactory plan to rule. Thi and Air Force chief Kỳ were then prominent in helping to crush the coup. Kỳ and Thi's role in putting down the coup attempt gave them more leverage in Saigon's military politics. Indebted to Kỳ, Thi and their so-called Young Turks for maintaining his hold on power, Khánh was now in a weaker position. This group of young officers were headlined by Thi, Kỳ, IV Corps commander General Nguyễn Văn Thiệu, and Admiral Chung Tấn Cang, the head of the Republic of Vietnam Navy. They publicly called on Khánh to remove "corrupt, dishonest and counterrevolutionary" officers, civil servants and exploitationists, and threatened to remove him if he did not enact their proposed reforms.

Some observers accused Kỳ and Thi of either allowing or deliberately orchestrating the plot to embarrass Khánh, portray themselves as heroes, and therefore gain prominence on the political stage. In later years, Cao Huy Thuan, a professor and Buddhist activist based in the city of Đà Nẵng in I Corps, claimed Kỳ and Thi met with him a few days before the coup, and had discussed their plans for joining a coup against Khánh. At the subsequent military trial of Phát and Đức's faction, the plotters were acquitted. According to the historian George McTurnan Kahin, Khánh rigged the trial so that Đức and Phát were acquitted so they would be used as a Catholic counterweight to the Young Turks faction of Kỳ and Thi, who in Khánh's eyes had become increasingly strong and ominous. Khánh decided to build an alliance with the generals from Minh's junta by releasing them from house arrest and recalling them to active roles. However, Thi and Kỳ were aware of the motives for these moves and adjusted accordingly.

=== Dissolution of the High National Council ===
The Young Turks and Khánh wanted to forcibly retire officers with more than 25 years of service, ostensibly because they thought them to be lethargic, out of touch, and ineffective. However, the unspoken and most important reason was because they viewed the older generals as rivals for power. Specific targets of this proposed policy were Minh and other senior officers in his short-lived junta, Trần Văn Đôn, Lê Văn Kim and Mai Hữu Xuân.

The signature of the military-appointed civilian Chief of State Phan Khắc Sửu was required to pass the ruling, but Sửu referred the matter to the High National Council (HNC), a junta-appointed civilian advisory body, to get their opinion. The HNC turned down the request. This was speculated to be because many HNC members were old, and did not appreciate the generals' negativity towards seniors. On 19 December, the generals dissolved the HNC. The operation was commanded by Thi — who had traveled into Saigon from I Corps — and Kỳ. The national police, which was under the control and command of the military, moved through the streets before dawn, arresting five HNC members and other politicians and student leaders they deemed to be an obstacle to military rule. Minh and the other aging generals were arrested and flown to Pleiku, a Central Highlands town in a Montagnard area and forcibly retired, while other officers were simply imprisoned in the capital. The junta's forces also arrested around 100 members of the National Salvation Council (NSC) of the anti-war Lê Khắc Quyến party. The NSC was a new political party active in the I Corps region that opposed the expansion of the war and was aligned with Thi and the Buddhist activist monk Thích Trí Quang. As Thi was active in the purge, it was believed that the Quyen had fallen out with Thi.

The deposal prompted US Ambassador Maxwell D. Taylor to angrily berate Thiệu, Thi, Kỳ and Cang in a private meeting and threaten to cut off aid if they did not reverse their decision. Although nettled by the outburst, Thi took a perverse pleasure in riling Taylor. He was seen by a CIA officer soon after, grinning. When asked why he was happy, Thi said "Because this is one of the happiest days of my life ... Today I told the American ambassador that he could not dictate to us." The dispute escalated for a few days as the junta threatened to expel Taylor, and Khanh went on a media offensive. A CIA informant reported that the arguments with Taylor had incensed the volatile Thi so much he privately vowed to "blow up everything" and "kill Phan Khac Suu, Trần Văn Hương and Nguyen Khanh and put an end to all this. Then we will see what happens." However, the dispute galvanized the officers' nationalist sentiments and they rallied around the embattled Khánh for a time. They ignored Taylor's threats without suffering repercussions because the Americans were too intent on defeating the communists to cut funding in an attempt to force policy change in Saigon. Thi became notorious for his involvement in infighting. A CIA dossier compiled in the 1960s said that Thi "is like a card player, placing his bets now on this leader, then on another; he plays his subordinates in the same manner. His only real objective is to continue the game." Time described him as "vain, ambitious, an inveterate intriguer". The New York Times described him as "a coup specialist".

In late January 1965, Buddhist protests against junta-appointed civilian Prime Minister Trần Văn Hương broke out across South Vietnam. The unrest came after Huong had unveiled plans to expand conscription and the war against the communists, and demonstrations were at their largest in I Corps, a Buddhist and anti-war escalation stronghold. In Huế, matters degenerated into a riot as 5,000 demonstrators attacked the United States Information Service Library and burned 8,000 books. Khánh and Thi were thought to have turned a blind eye to the rioting in order to allow the disorder to ruin the Huong government and allow them to inherit power. Khánh decided to have the armed forces replace Huong, and on the morning of 27 January, Khánh staged a bloodless putsch with the support of Thi and Kỳ. However, many of the officers had agreed to Khánh's plan in hopes he would fail and discredit himself.

== 1965 coup against Nguyen Khanh ==
By this time, Taylor's relationship with Khánh had already broken down irreparably over the issue of the HNC, and the US became increasingly intent on a regime change as Khánh was becoming increasingly reliant on Buddhist support, which they saw as an obstacle to their war expansion plans. In the first week of February, Taylor told the leading South Vietnamese officers that the US was "in no way propping up General Khánh or backing him in any fashion". Despite their mutual alignment with Buddhist activists, Thi was known to have become personally hostile to Khánh by this time. During this time, many officers were organizing separate plots against Khánh.

Shortly before noon on 19 February, the undetected communist agent, Colonels Thảo and Phát used tanks and some infantry battalions to seize control of the national military headquarters, post office and the radio station of Saigon. The rebels failed to capture Kỳ, who fled to Tan Son Nhut, where he ran into Khánh, and the pair flew off together, while some junta figures were arrested there. Thao made a radio announcement stating his desire to get rid of Khánh, whom he described as a "dictator", while some of his fellow rebels made comments eulogizing Diem and indicating that they would start a hardline Catholic regime. This alarmed Thi, as the tone of the comments indicated that the rebels might punish people who had fought against Diệm in the past, such as those involved in the 1960 and 1963 coups.

The Americans decided that while they wanted Khánh out, they did not approve of Thảo and Phát, and their polarizing policies, so they began to lobby Kỳ and Thi, the two most powerful officers apart from Khánh, to defeat both sides. While Kỳ used air power to stop the two sides from confrontation by threatening to bomb them if they opened fire, the Americans consulted with Thi and General Cao Văn Viên, the commander of III Corps surrounding Saigon. They wanted Thi and Vien to assemble units hostile to both Khánh and the rebels into a Capital Liberation Force. The Americans provided Thi with a plane so that he could fly in from his I Corps headquarters in Đà Nẵng to lead ground forces against both Khanh and the rebels.

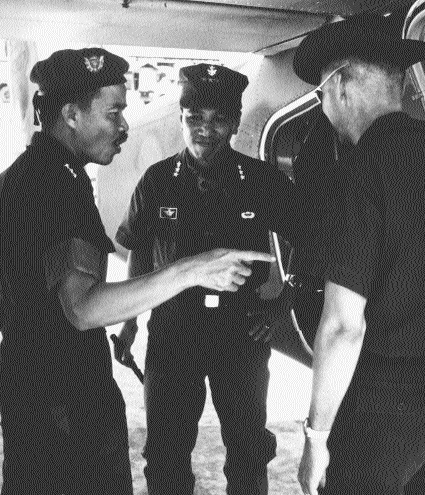
Thi (left) and Thiệu (right) during the 1960s. Both were prominent in Saigon military politics in the 1960s.

Late in the night, Thảo and Phát met with Kỳ in a meeting organized by the Americans, and insisted that Khanh be removed from power. The coup collapsed when, between midnight and dawn, anti-coup forces swept into the city; it was generally thought that the rebels did not put up a fight after being assured that Khánh would be ousted. Early in the morning, Thi, who gained the support of Kỳ, proposed a motion within the junta to remove Khánh and force him into exile, and the final vote was unanimous—Khanh was absent from the meeting. Kỳ, Thi and Thiệu then became the key figures in a junta that continued with Sửu and Prime Minister Phan Huy Quát as a civilian front, although General Minh became the nominal commander-in-chief of the armed forces.

Thi was a senior member in the ten-man ruling junta, which wanted to expand the military effort against the communists, something that was opposed by the Buddhist protestors. Thi performed a balancing act and accommodated the Buddhists, wanting them to see him as a friend. He allowed the students to publish a magazine that was highly critical of military rule. Thi also manoeuvred to have his trusted subordinate Colonel Pham Van Lieu installed as the head of the national police—a body controlled by the army and effectively a military unit—increasing his political power. Following his ascension, Lieu replaced most of the Saigon district police chiefs with Thi supporters, raising the ire of some other prominent officers. The Buddhist activist leader Thích Trí Quang said that "Thi is nominally a Buddhist, but does not really care about religion". In June 1965, Quat and Sửu resigned because of persistent disputes with the military and one another; Thi had an opportunity to take power. Quat resigned and tried to directly hand over power to Thi, but this was not allowed by the generals. Nevertheless, Thi was offered the prime ministerial position by his colleagues. He was seen as having a similar level of political influence to Kỳ, and was voted in as prime minister by the ten-man junta. However, he declined the job offer on the private advice of Lieu, who told him that the political conditions were not ideal and that he should let a rival take control and fail before stepping in himself. According to Kahin, "to his [Thi's] own bitter disappointment, he was never given a second chance". Thi's blunder was a great relief to the Americans, who were aware of the fact that Thi—despite being anti-communist—had a hostility towards American advice. Kỳ and Thiệu, both pro-American and supportive of a drastic escalation in anti-communist military activity, became prime minister and head of state respectively, the latter post being largely ceremonial. Regardless of who held the top jobs, no officer had firm control over his peers, and the respective corps commanders were effectively allowed to independently rule their own regions in return for ongoing support of the junta.

In the same year, US ground forces were introduced into combat roles in large numbers, and the first US Marines came ashore at Da Nang in Thi's I Corps. The flamboyant Thi organized for the American troops to be greeted by military bands, welcoming banners and teenage girls who garlanded them with flowers. This caused embarrassment to US military officials who felt the introduction of combat troops and resultant American casualties would not be received well by the public when contrasted with Thi's celebratory fanfare. Soon after the Americans were in position, Thi tipped off Marine Lieutenant General Lewis W. Walt about a major movement of Việt Cộng insurgents near Chu Lai in Quảng Trị Province near the border with North Vietnam. This resulted in Operation Starlite, generally regarded as the first offensive action undertaken by the Americans in the Vietnam War. Occurring between 18–24 August, it resulted in the 1st Việt Cộng Regiment being pushed to the coast.

== Buddhist Uprising of 1966 ==
Air Marshal Kỳ, the prime minister and the most powerful member of the junta feared Thi as a rival. Many political observers in Saigon thought Thi actively wanted to depose Kỳ, and regarded him as the biggest threat to the other officers' factions and the junta's stability. According to Kỳ's memoirs, Thi was a "born intriguer" who had "left-wing inclinations". Time magazine published a piece in February 1966 claiming Thi was more dynamic than Kỳ and could seize power at any time. Historian Robert Topmiller thought Kỳ may have seen the article as destabilizing and therefore decided to move against Thi, who was known to have the "deep-rooted" loyalty of his soldiers. A large part of the South Vietnamese military was the Regional and Popular Forces, militia that served in their native areas, and they appreciated a commander with whom they had a regionalistic rapport. The support from the Buddhists, his troops and the regionalistic tendencies gave Thi a strong power base and made it hard for the other generals and the Americans to move against him. The outspoken Thi was also known as the general most likely to question and speak out against US policy.

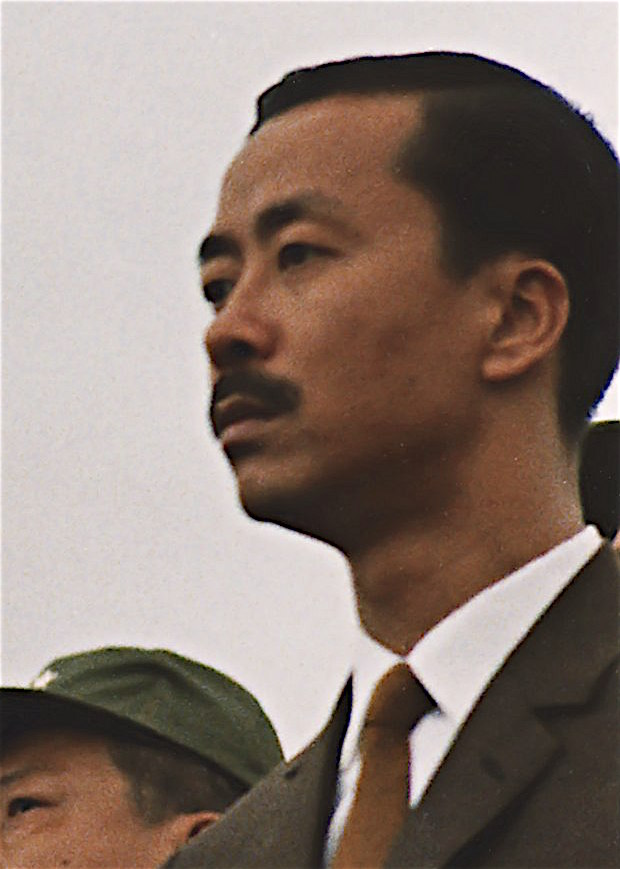
Nguyễn Cao Kỳ, Thi's fiercest rival.

The historian Stanley Karnow said of Kỳ and Thi: "Both flamboyant characters who wore gaudy uniforms and sported sinister moustaches, the two young officers had been friends, and their rivalry seemed to typify the personal struggles for power that chronically afflicted South Vietnam. But their dispute mirrored more than individual ambition." Both were also known for their colorful red berets. There were reports Thi was showing insubordination towards Kỳ. The US military commander in Vietnam, General William Westmoreland, said that Thi once refused to report to Kỳ in Saigon when requested. On one occasion, when Kỳ came to I Corps to remonstrate with him, Thi turned to address his staff and mockingly asked "Should we pay attention to this funny little man from Saigon or should we ignore him?" Thi made this comment rather loudly, within earshot of Ky, and the Vietnamese politician Bùi Diễm thought that Kỳ viewed Thi's comment as a direct and calculated challenge to his authority. Time said Thi "ran it [I Corps] like a warlord of yore, obeying those edicts of the central government that suited him and blithely disregarding the rest". Of the four corps commanders, Thi was seen as the one with the most power and independence from Saigon. Kahin thought Kỳ may have feared that Thi would secede from Saigon and turn central Vietnam into an independent state. The CIA analyst Douglas Pike, who worked in Vietnam, speculated that this would have been a large part of Ky's thinking, as Vietnamese people have often had strong regional tendencies.

Knowing that Westmoreland and the US Embassy were hostile to Thi and supportive of his leadership, Kỳ mustered the support of eight generals on the 10-man junta, meaning that along with his vote, there were nine officers in favor of Thi's removal. With Thi the only non-supporter, Kỳ and his colleagues removed Thi from the junta and his corps command on 10 March 1966. Thi claimed that during this meeting, knowing the other generals' antipathy to him, he nettled them by chastising their commitment to the country. He said the populace would never support the generals' war effort as long as they lived so comfortably, and he mocked them for ostentatiously flying their wives and mistresses to Hong Kong for shopping expeditions. The junta put Thi under house arrest pending his deportation from the country, and appointed General Nguyễn Văn Chuân, the erstwhile commander of 1st Division and a Thi subordinate, as the new I Corps commander.

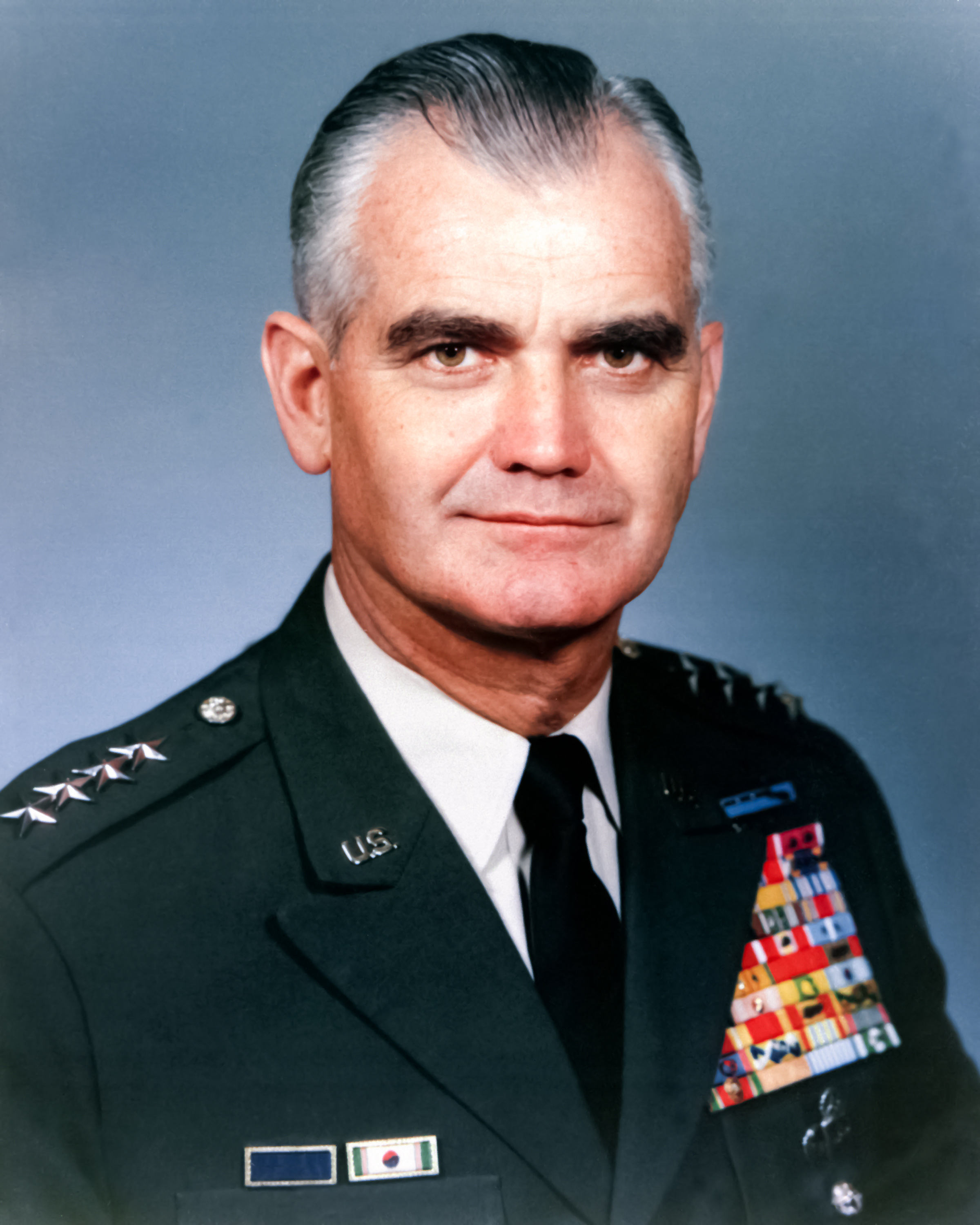
William Westmoreland, the US commander in Vietnam, disapproved of Thi and supported his removal from command.

The Americans supported Thi's removal as they regarded him as being soft on communism, and a "virtual warlord". US Ambassador Henry Cabot Lodge Jr., Westmoreland and the Defense Secretary Robert McNamara were supportive of the Kỳ-Thiệu regime, their prosecution of the war against the communists and support of a US escalation, and they opposed Thi, regarding him as lacking firmness against communism. At a White House meeting after news of the dismissal came through, Taylor said that Thi was "a bad character and good riddance". Lodge wrote in a report that Thi "cherished some resentment against the Americans in respect of what he considers political and military interference and infringement of sovereignty", claiming he had contemplated "the possibility of establishing a government in the south which would be of such a character that the bulk of the population including the Vietcong would support it—and presumably neutralization of the country and possibly federation with the North would soon be possible". The Americans wanted to ease Thi out of the corridors of power by offering him an economic future in the US and free education for his children, and Lodge and Westmoreland personally spoke to him in an attempt to convince him to accept, but they were unsuccessful. On the other hand, Thi had the support of Walt, who commanded American forces in I Corps and was the senior advisor to Thi's forces. Unlike his countrymen, Walt thought highly of Thi, and his ability as an officer.

Kỳ claimed Thi was leaving the country to receive medical treatment for his nasal passages, as well as a general health examination. An official announcement said that the junta "had considered and accepted General Thi's application for a vacation". Thi retorted that "The only sinus condition I have is from the stink of corruption." With the health story exposed as a sham, Kỳ gave a series of reasons for dismissing Thi, accusing him of being too left-wing, ruling I Corps like a warlord, having a mistress who was suspected of being a communist, and being too conspiratorial. Kỳ knew that Thi supported negotiations with the communists as a means of ending the war, and had a history of consistently removing officials and military figures who promoted such a policy, but did not publicly mention this as a reason. Thi's dismissal provoked the Buddhist Uprising, led by the "Struggle Movement". Thi was immensely popular in the Buddhist stronghold of Huế, a city of approximately 120,000, and civil unrest erupted throughout the region. When he returned to the former imperial capital five days after being relieved of his command, around 20,000 supporters mobbed him, shouting and trying to touch him. This was part of a gamble by Kỳ to allow Thi back to his home city in an attempt to placate the dismayed locals, but it did not work. A general strike incapacited 90% of Da Nang, the second biggest city in South Vietnam and the main port in central Vietnam.

During a rally, a Buddhist student leader cried "Do you want the general to stay with us?" to which the students and other protestors answered, "Yes! Yes!" Thi told the large crowd to "Think about our country, not about me". During the tongue-in-cheek speech, he made sarcastic references about his need to go to the US for health treatment. He told a journalist that he would accept "any position which is useful for the country", leading some to think that he wanted Kỳ or Thiệu's job. According to Time magazine, Thi's speeches showed he "was obviously torn between a desire to rally support for a comeback and his soldier's distaste for adding to dissension". Kahin said that "despite the circumspection of his public addresses, [they] undoubtedly helped encourage the Struggle Movement."

The various dissidents formed a pro-Thi, anti-Kỳ organization called the Military-Civilian Struggle Committee, better known as the Struggle Movement. Their message and influence quickly spread as they called for the end of military rule and took over radio stations and government buildings in I Corps. They intensified their calls for Kỳ to fulfil his promise to hold democratic elections. Some I Corps units supportive of Thi then decided to join the Struggle Movement and ceased military operations against the Vietcong, instead starting a stand-off against Kỳ. Throughout April and May there were tense incidents as units loyal to the junta were flown in from Saigon, and the factions came close to warfare.

Thi publicly disassociated himself from the Struggle Movement. However, he remained in I Corps and was still regarded as a significant political influence and motivating factor for the Struggle Movement. Regardless of what he may have thought, the discontent against Kỳ was by then too much for him to control even if he had wanted to. By June, ARVN loyalists, with the help of the American forces, prevailed. Their superior numbers convinced many in the Struggle Movement to back down and realign with the government, and those who refused were militarily defeated, often in bitter street-to-street fighting. While the Struggle Movement was finally ebbing away, Thi agreed to meet with Kỳ at an American air base in Chu Lai to reach a settlement, seeing as the junta was going to prevail in any case. Thi agreed to the original offers of subsidies and the cover story of a medical trip.

== Exile ==
After the uprising was crushed, Thi was deported to the US, and lived in a small apartment on Connecticut Avenue on Dupont Circle, Washington, D.C. Although the apartment was small, Kahin, who interviewed Thi after his exile, described it as "handsome". However, The New York Times called it "shabby". Thi left his uniforms in his closet in Vietnam and disposed of all his medals. The only thing he kept from his military career was an army blanket. As part of his removal from South Vietnam, the American government gave him a substantial living allowance and paid for all his children's education fees. Around 1973, the payments were suddenly discontinued. In Washington, Thi spent much of his time at the Library of Congress, reading books about Asian history. Outspoken and still supported by many Buddhists, Thi tried to return to South Vietnam in February 1972, but troops loyal to President Thiệu surrounded his plane on the tarmac and prevented him from disembarking; the aircraft eventually took off and returned to the US.

Thi lived in the American capital where he had a house on Everett St. NW until 1975, when he moved to Arkansas. He lived in the southern state for a short period before settling in Lancaster, Pennsylvania. He worked in a variety of jobs and occasionally made speeches at universities and to Vietnamese American organizations and meetings. According to his relatives, Thi remained popular among the Vietnamese American community, most of whom had come to the US after the fall of Saigon and were stridently anti-communist. His family said their refugee compatriots often recognized him, and usually refused to let him pay for meals at their restaurants. Thi's second marriage, to Oanh Nguyen, ended in divorce. They had five children, four sons and a daughter. He later remarried, to Catherine Nguyen, who bore him a daughter. In all, Thi had six children and 12 grandchildren. He died at the Hospice of Lancaster County from heart ailments on 23 June 2007.

== Honour ==
=== Foreign honour ===
- Malaysia :
  - Honorary Commander of the Order of the Defender of the Realm (P.M.N.) (1965)
