= 1964 South Vietnamese coup =

The 1964 South Vietnamese coup may refer to:

- January 1964 South Vietnamese coup
- September 1964 South Vietnamese coup attempt
- December 1964 South Vietnamese coup
