= 1964 Brinks Hotel bombing =

Vietcong bombing in Saigon, South Vietnam

- Part of the Vietnam War
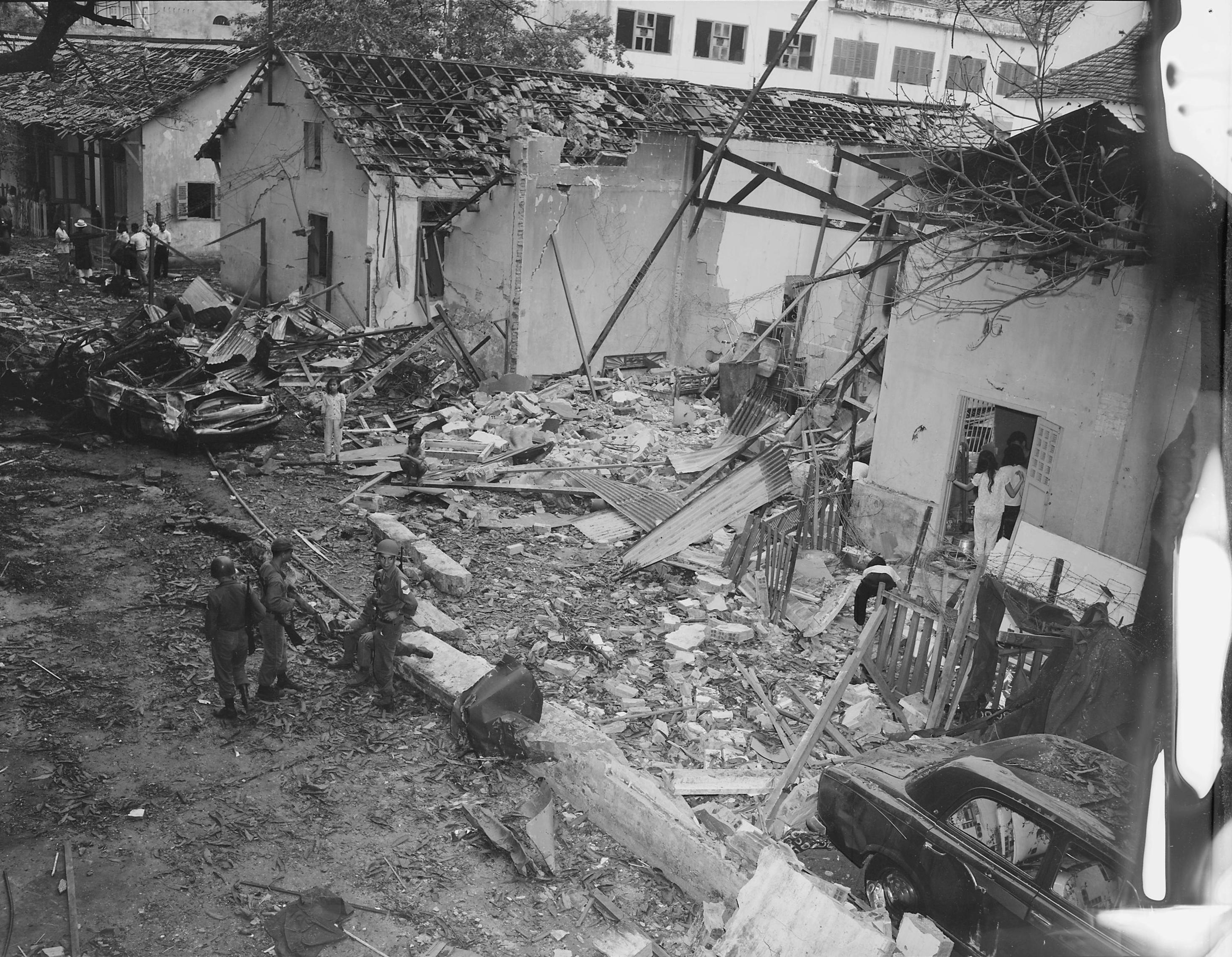
- The aftermath of the bombing
- Location: 10°46′10″N 106°40′55″E; Saigon, South Vietnam
- Date: 24 December 1964
- Attack type: Bombing
- Deaths: 2
- Injuries: 53–63
- Perpetrator: Vietcong

The Brinks Hotel in Saigon, also known as the Brink Bachelor Officers Quarters (BOQ), was bombed by the Vietcong on the evening of 24 December 1964, during the Vietnam War. Two Vietcong operatives detonated a car bomb underneath the hotel, which housed United States Army officers. The explosion killed two Americans, an officer and an NCO, and injured approximately 60, including military personnel and Vietnamese civilians.

The Vietcong commanders had planned the venture with two objectives in mind. Firstly, by attacking an American installation in the center of the heavily guarded capital, the Vietcong intended to demonstrate their ability to strike in South Vietnam should the United States decide to launch air raids against North Vietnam. Secondly, the bombing would demonstrate to the South Vietnamese that the Americans were vulnerable and could not be relied upon for protection.

The bombing prompted debate within the administration of United States President Lyndon B. Johnson. Most of his advisers favored retaliatory bombing of North Vietnam and the introduction of American combat troops, while Johnson preferred the existing strategy of training the Army of the Republic of Vietnam to protect South Vietnam from the Vietcong. In the end, Johnson decided not to take retaliatory action.

== Background and planning ==
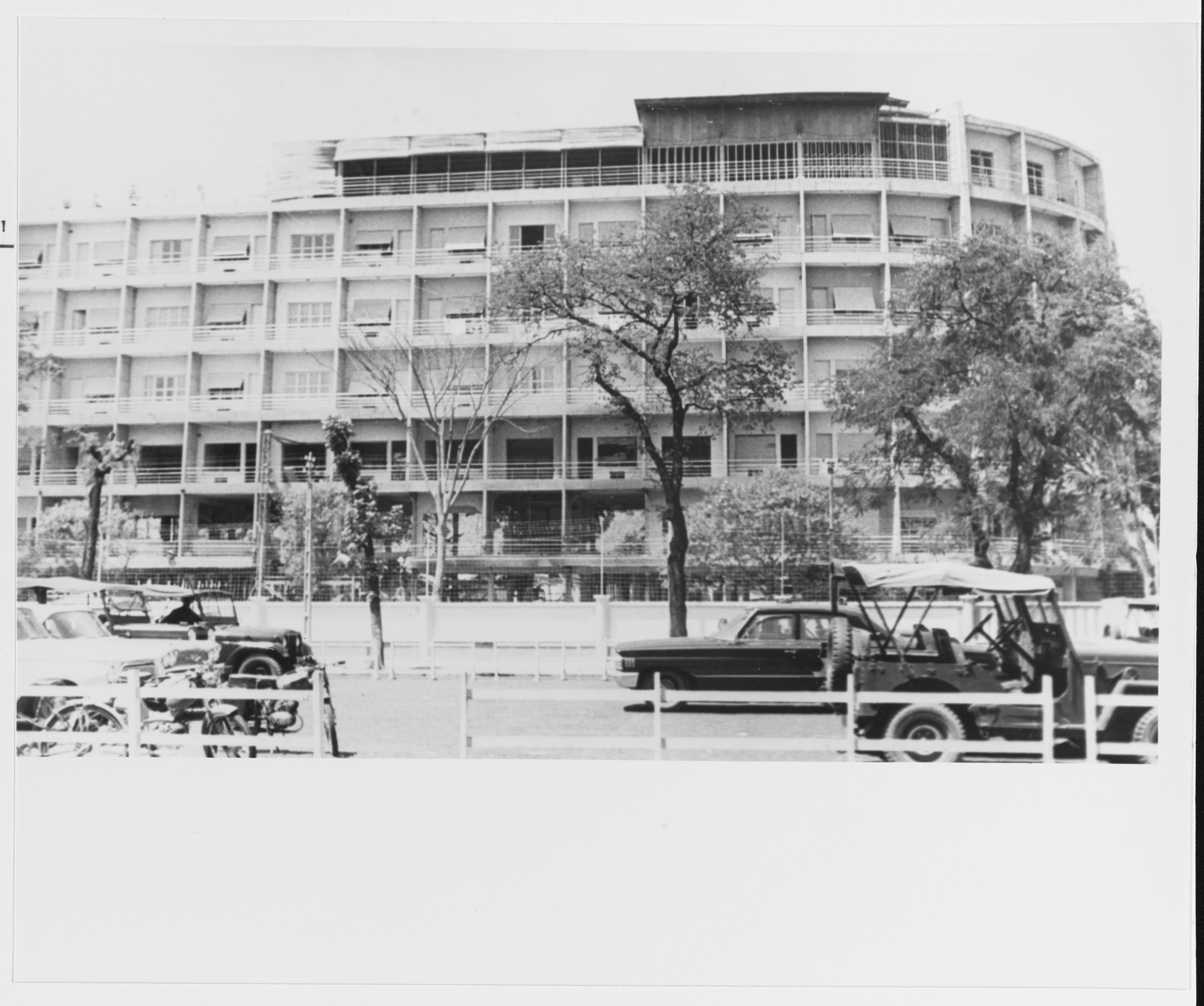
Brink BOQ, Saigon, South Vietnam

Following World War II, the communist-dominated Viet Minh fought the French colonial forces in an attempt to gain Vietnamese independence. After the French defeat at the Battle of Dien Bien Phu in 1954, Vietnam was partitioned at the 17th parallel, pending national reunification elections in 1956. The elections were canceled, resulting in the long-term existence of communist North Vietnam and anti-communist South Vietnam as separate states. In the late 1950s, South Vietnamese guerrillas known as the Vietcong—covertly supported by North Vietnam—began an insurgency with the aim of forcefully reunifying the country under communist rule. With the Cold War at its height, the United States—the main backer of South Vietnam—sent military advisers into the country to help train and guide the Army of the Republic of Vietnam (ARVN) in their fight against the Vietcong. By 1964, there were 23,000 American military personnel in the country. The communists viewed the Americans as colonizers and the South Vietnamese as their puppets, and attacked both with force. Urban attacks on American personnel began in February 1963, with a bombing at a dining venue that killed one and wounded three. During that month, there were three more attacks on Americans in dining or entertainment venues, killing a total of 6 and injuring 68, leading to systematic security measures being put in place in Saigon to protect off-duty Americans.

The bombing was planned and performed by two Vietcong agents who escaped uninjured and were never captured. Nguyen Thanh Xuan recollected his involvement to historian Stanley Karnow after the war had ended. In late November, Xuan and his comrade received orders from a Vietcong intermediary to bomb the Brinks Hotel. The building housed United States Army officers, including lieutenant colonels and majors, and attracted off-duty personnel with its highly regarded food and drink, rooftop seating areas and movie screenings. It also hosted a few officers who were members of the Australian Army Training Team Vietnam. The building was named after Brigadier General Francis G. Brink, who had served as the first commander of MAAG Indochina during the First Indochina War, and had been used by American personnel for about four years. A rooftop dinner had been planned for Christmas Eve.

According to the historian Mark Moyar, it was a six-story building and had 193 bedrooms, although The New York Times reported that the building had eight stories and had 60 bedrooms that housed two people each. The building was L-shaped and was surrounded by a 4.5 m concrete wall, which provided a buffer zone of 15 m from the wall of the hotel. The buffer zone was used as a carpark and the streets adjoining the hotel were heavily lit and guarded by Vietnamese personnel at all times. The sentries had a reputation for being lax patrollers, as US journalists often entered the compound late in the evenings without being checked.

The Vietcong duo observed their target over the next month, mixing with the crowds in the busy street outside. Noting that South Vietnamese officers mingled freely with Americans, they obtained ARVN uniforms from Saigon's black market, enabling them to get closer. Xuan disguised himself as a military chauffeur, while his partner dressed as a South Vietnamese major. They mingled with the real officers so that they could copy their mannerisms, speaking style and even their way of smoking. The Vietcong pair then procured the two cars and explosives needed for the operation.

The Vietcong commanders had planned the venture with two aims in mind. Firstly, by attacking an American institution in the heart of the heavily guarded capital, the bombing would demonstrate the Vietcong's ability to strike against the Americans in Vietnam, should the United States decide to launch air raids against North Vietnam. Secondly, the attack would demonstrate to the South Vietnamese public that the Americans were vulnerable and could not be relied upon for protection. Xuan added that "all the crimes committed by the Americans were directed from this nerve center". In the month leading up to the attack, South Vietnamese military intelligence had seized communist documents indicating a strategy of attacking US military targets in urban areas during the Christmas period in order to lower the morale of the US public and turn opinion against intervention in Vietnam. He recalled that the number of American officers at the Brinks Hotel had swelled on Christmas Eve because they were using the building to coordinate their celebrations, and that the attack would therefore cause more casualties than on a normal day.

== Explosion ==
The bombers planted explosives weighing approximately 90 kilograms (200 lb) in the trunk of one of the cars, and set a timing device to trigger the bomb at 17:45, during the happy hour in the officers' bar at the hotel. The pair drove their vehicles into the hotel's grounds. Knowing from their intelligence that a certain American colonel had returned to the US, the "major" lied and told the hotel clerk that he had an appointment with the American officer, claiming that the colonel would be coming from Da Lat. The clerk correctly replied that the colonel had left the country, but the "major" insisted that the clerk was mistaken. The "major" then parked his vehicle in the car park beneath the hotel, before ordering his chauffeur to leave and fetch the American with the other vehicle. He then left the hotel grounds, asking the guard to tell the American colonel to wait for him. The "major" claimed that he had not eaten all day and was going to a nearby café.

While the "major" was at the eatery, the bomb detonated, killing two American officers. The first and highest-ranking officer killed was Lieutenant Colonel James Robert Hagen, who had served in the army for 20 years and was working for MACV. Hagen was found dead amid the rubble two hours after the blast. The second victim was David M. Agnew, a civilian employee of the Navy Department who attended to real estate matters.

The injury reports are conflicting. Karnow reported that 58 people (military and civilian) were injured, Mark Moyar reported that 38 American officers were wounded along with 25 Vietnamese civilians, who worked inside the building, while journalist A. J. Langguth reported that 10 Americans and 43 Vietnamese were injured. A report in The New York Times the day after the attack reported 98 injuries, including 61 US military personnel, 2 US civilians, 34 Vietnamese and an Australian serviceman. Many of the US officers were still on their way back to the Brinks and arrived a few minutes after the blast; there would have been more casualties if the explosion had occurred later. Most of the injured suffered from lacerations or concussions and were not badly hurt; all but 20 were released from hospital within five hours and those who remained did not suffer life-threatening injuries. Many mid-level officers, including lieutenant colonels and majors, were injured, though few were hospitalized for more than one day.

Apart from the steel girders, which supported the building, the explosion completely destroyed the ground floor. The bottom four floors were all punctured by the blast and sustained significant damage. The damage was accentuated because several trucks were in the underground car park, with gas canisters ready for delivery; the explosion detonated the gas, creating a fireball which took 40 minutes to extinguish. Several vehicles were crushed or destroyed by fire. The damage was sufficient to render the building uninhabitable pending a major repair, and all those who were billeted there had to be moved to other accommodation. Flying debris damaged nearby buildings, including the living quarters for enlisted men located across the street, and Saigon's two leading hotels, the Caravelle and the Continental. The force of the explosion also shattered windows at the United States Information Service two blocks away and in shopfronts on the main shopping promenade Rue Catinat.

The blast destroyed the studios of the Armed Forces Radio Service, which were on the ground floor of the hotel, but the station returned to the airwaves two hours later, using an emergency transmitter. The explosion forced the US to fly in more bomb-detection equipment, as most of the devices already in Vietnam were stored inside the hotel and were destroyed in the attack.

At the time, American entertainers, including Bob Hope, were in Saigon to perform for US personnel. It is unclear whether Hope was a target; Moyar reported that Hope was targeted, but was delayed at the airport due to a luggage mishap, while Lawrence J. Quirk reported that the comedian and his troupe were staying in a hotel across the street and were not in range of the blast. At a show the next day, Hope quipped: "A funny thing happened to me when I was driving through downtown Saigon to my hotel last night. We met a hotel going the other way."

== Reaction ==
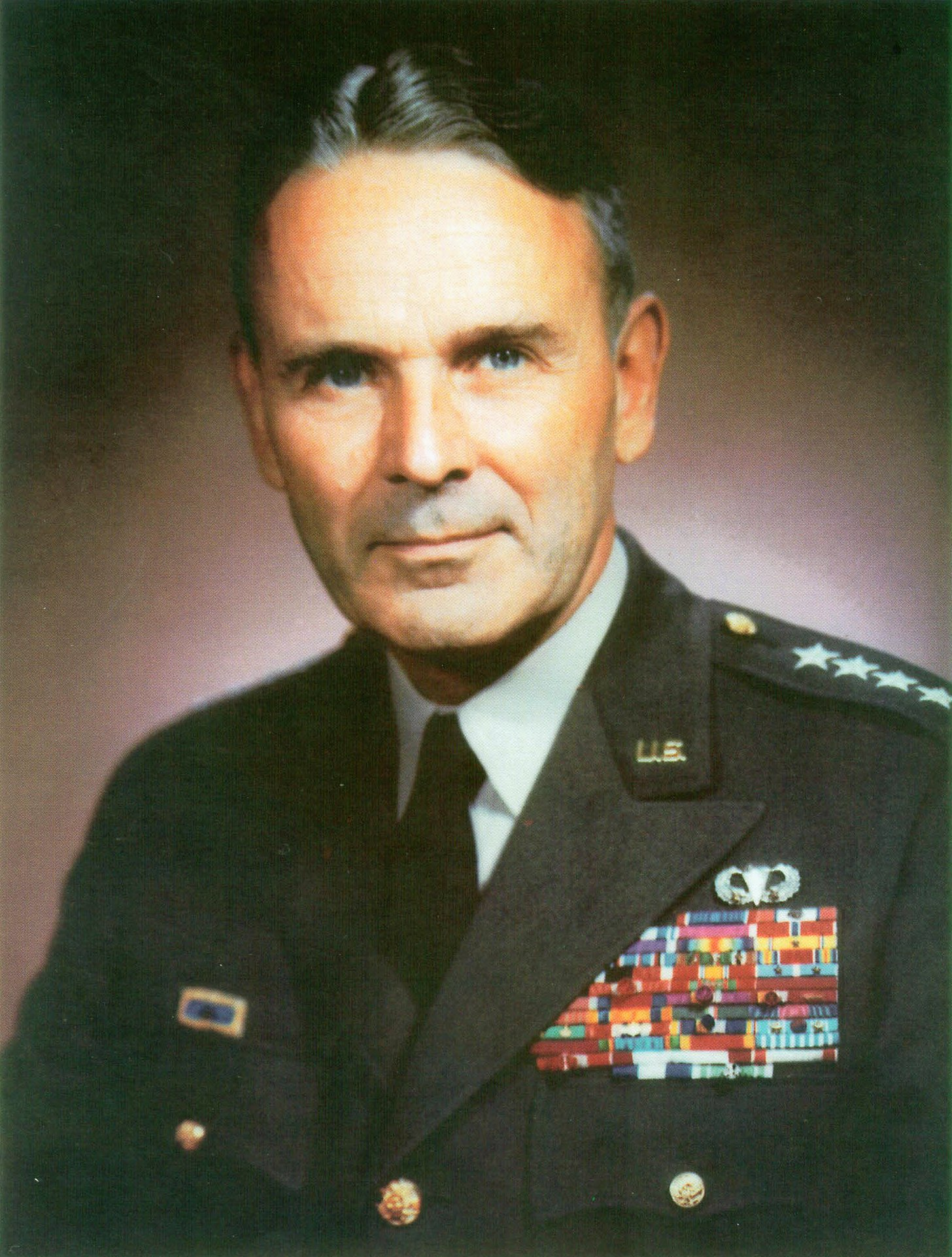
Maxwell Taylor, the US Ambassador to South Vietnam, called for air strikes against North Vietnam in retaliation for the bombing.

The attack surprised American officials and policymakers on Vietnam, who were confident that the South Vietnamese government was in control in Saigon and that the Vietcong were only a threat in rural areas. The South Vietnamese government was unstable, as it was the latest in a series of military juntas that had ruled for brief periods before being deposed. The infighting exasperated Maxwell Taylor, the US ambassador to South Vietnam and former chairman of the US Joint Chiefs of Staff, who felt that the disputes between the junta's senior officers were derailing the war effort. Less than two weeks before the bombing the generals had dissolved the High National Council, a civilian advisory body, prompting Taylor to summon the generals to his office. The ambassador then angrily denounced the generals, and the next day advised General Nguyen Khanh, the president, to resign and go into exile, as he had lost Taylor's confidence.

Khanh threatened to expel Taylor, who said that his forced departure would mean the end of US support for South Vietnam. On 22 December, Khanh announced on Radio Vietnam that "We make sacrifices for the country's independence and the Vietnamese people's liberty, but not to carry out the policy of any foreign country". Khanh explicitly denounced Taylor in an interview published in the New York Herald Tribune on 23 December, and on the day of the bombing, he issued a declaration of independence from "foreign manipulation". At the time, Khanh was also secretly negotiating with the communists, hoping to put together a peace deal so he could expel the Americans from Vietnam. As a result, there was a suspicion among a minority that Khanh and his officers had been behind the attack, though the Vietcong had claimed responsibility.

The Americans responded by organizing urgent security meetings with Saigon officials to increase safety standards. This led to an increase in military patrols around all US military accommodation in Saigon, which were also exhaustively searched for explosives. An additional 65 US Navy personnel were deployed for this purpose, and passers-by in the streets were stopped and checked for weapons.

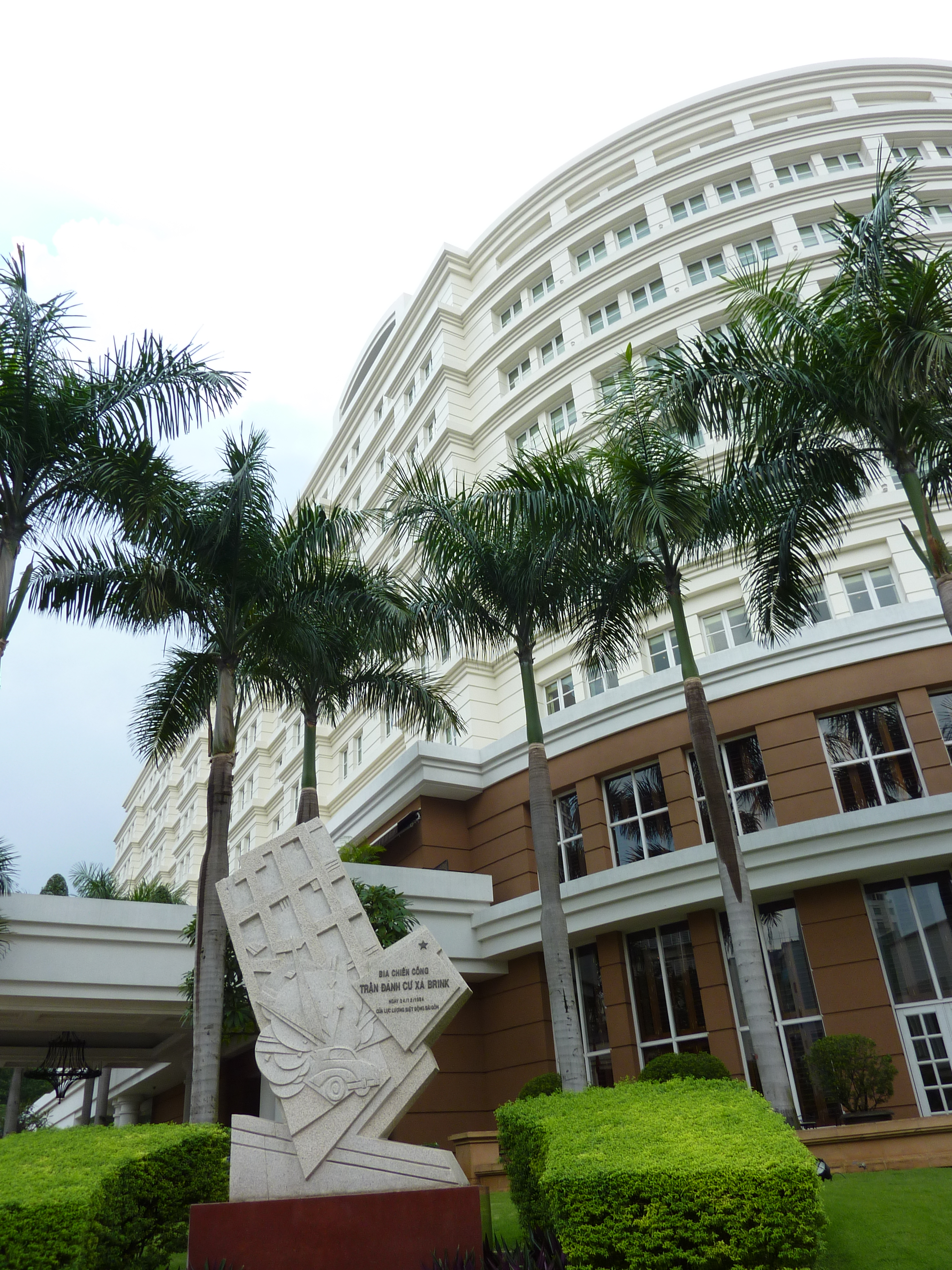
The text in Vietnamese present on the memorial reads (from top to bottom): BIA CHIẾN CÔNG · TRẬN ĐÁNH CƯ XÁ BRINK · NGÀY 24/12/1964 · Lực lượng biệt động Sài Gòn (Feat of Arms Stele · The Battle of Brink Apartment · On 24 December 1964 · [of] The Saigon Commando Force)

General William Westmoreland, who was the US Army commander in South Vietnam, Taylor, and other senior US officers in Saigon and Washington, D.C., urged President Lyndon B. Johnson to authorize reprisal bombings against North Vietnam. Taylor messaged Washington on Christmas Day, saying, "Hanoi will get the word that, despite our present tribulations, there is still bite in the tiger they call paper, and the U.S. stock in this part of the world will take sharp rise. Some of our local squabbles will probably disappear in enthusiasm which our action would generate." Taylor recommended that the US take unilateral action, citing the animosity between himself and Khanh's junta.

Johnson called his US-based advisers to his Texas ranch for discussions on Christmas Day. Secretary of State Dean Rusk and Secretary of Defense Robert McNamara advised Johnson to reject Taylor's proposal. Johnson declined to act, stating that an escalation during the Christmas period would be inappropriate, as it would damage public morale. He also noted that because of the political instability in Saigon, the international community and the American public were unlikely to believe that the Vietcong were behind the attack, feeling that they would instead blame local infighting for the bombing, although the Vietcong had already claimed responsibility. Johnson administration officials concluded four days after the bombing that the Vietcong were responsible. Johnson believed that it was too late to retaliate and that any action taken more than 36 hours after the event constituted unprovoked aggression. The State Department cabled Taylor and the embassy, saying that "In view of the overall confusion in Saigon", public US and international opinion towards an American air strike would be that the Johnson administration was "trying to shoot its way out of an internal [South Vietnamese] political crisis". Johnson said to Taylor that "Every time I get a military recommendation it seems to me that it calls for large-scale bombing. I have never felt that this war will be won from the air." At the time, Johnson was reluctant to accede to his officials' calls for large-scale bombing of North Vietnam, a strategy that eventually became policy.

In January 1965, the Vietcong secretly held their third conference in South Vietnam. The delegates expressed strong confidence that—according to Mark Moyar—"the Americans lacked the will to strike North Vietnam or shield South Vietnam from the mortal blow" (i.e. from a forthcoming offensive). Moyar believes that this conclusion resulted in part from the Americans' failure to retaliate for the Brinks Hotel bombing. At the time, North Vietnam vigorously denied ever sending troops or equipment into South Vietnam. In reality, both sides violated the 1954 Geneva Accords by covertly infiltrating the other's borders to carry out hostile military activity. Meanwhile, South Vietnam's government had imposed media censorship in November 1964 and closed ten newspapers for sympathizing with the communists. The attack fomented feelings of insecurity among American policymakers about communist attacks. Johnson hoped that the continuing presence of American military advisers would be sufficient to strengthen the ARVN so that it could stabilize the Saigon government, but many of his defense department advisers felt that American combat troops were needed on the ground. This increased the tension between the president's civilian and military officials, before the Americans became directly involved in fighting in 1965. David Tucker of the United States Army War College said that the bombing was "insignificant for the conventional military balance but important for the political struggle that was the primary focus of the enemy [Vietcong]". The facility was repaired and American officers continued to stay there until the fall of Saigon on 30 April 1975, when the communists overran South Vietnam and reunified the country under their rule.

Today, the site is a Park Hyatt hotel built along French Colonial architectural lines, and there is a memorial to the bombing at the site.
