= Beverly Deepe Keever =

American journalist and war correspondent

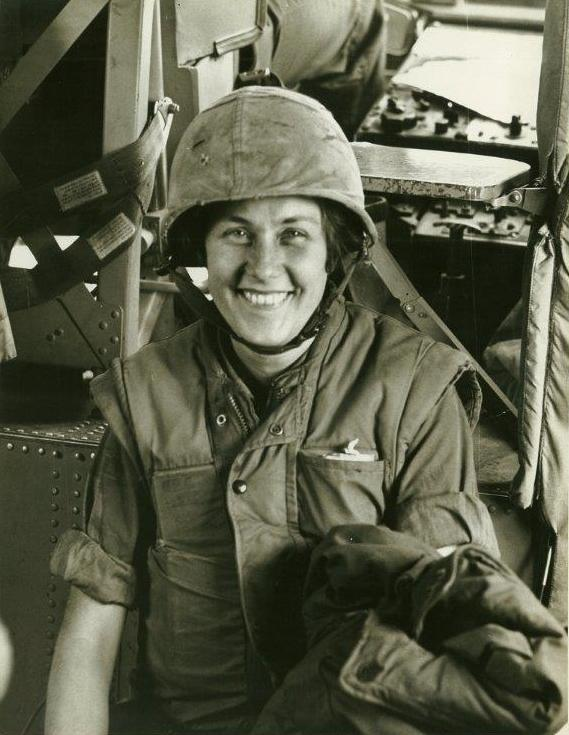
- Keever in 1968
- Born: Beverly Deepe; June 1, 1935 (age 90); Hebron, Nebraska, U.S.
- Education: University of Nebraska, Bachelor of Arts, Columbia University, Master of Science in Journalism University of Hawaiʻi, Master of Library and Information Studies and Doctor of Philosophy
- Occupations: Journalist, author, professor
- Notable credit(s): Death Zones and Darling Spies: Seven Years of Vietnam War Reporting (2013), News Zero: The New York Times and The Bomb (2004), 15 U.S. News Coverage of Racial Minorities, A Sourcebook: 1934 to 1996; co-editor and chapter contributor, Top Secret: Censoring the First Rough Draft of Atomic-Bomb History, Four articles based on the personal papers of Wilbur Schramm, a founder of the communications discipline, Poisoning the Pacific on Nuclear Guinea Pigs, Suffering Secrecy Exile, Remember Enewetak, Stopping the Presses: The Unprecedented Licensing of Hawaii's Media After the Attack on Pearl Harbor
- Spouse: Charles J. Keever

Beverly Deepe Keever (born June 1, 1935) is an American journalist, Vietnam War correspondent, author and professor emerita of journalism and communications.

Beverly Deepe Keever’s career has spanned the journalistic profession and professorate. It ranged from public opinion polling for an author-syndicated columnist in New York City, to war correspondent, to covering Capitol Hill in Washington, D.C., and then to teaching and researching journalism and communications for 29 years at the University of Hawaiʻi at Mānoa.

As a professor emerita and 40-some years after departing Saigon, she wrote her memoirs of covering the Vietnam War for seven years—longer than any other American correspondent of that time. Titled Death Zones and Darling Spies, the book chronicles her dispatches as a freelancer and then successively for Newsweek, the New York Herald Tribune, The Christian Science Monitor and the London Daily Express and Sunday Express as she discusses in a video presentation with interviewer Lynn Roper, instructor for the Osher Lifelong Learning Institute in Lincoln, Neb., in 2021.

Her 1968 coverage of the embattled Khe Sanh Combat Base was submitted for the Pulitzer Prize for International Reporting by the Christian Science Monitor. Another of her 1968 dispatches was selected by the Columbia University Graduate School of Journalism in its centennial year as one of the 50 great stories by its alumni. In 2001, she was one of some four dozen combat correspondents whose work was selected for an exhibit at the Newseum in Washington, D.C., designed to trace 148 years of war reporting starting with the Crimean conflict of 1853. Fourteen years later, her artifacts and journalistic career were displayed and discussed in the "Reporting Vietnam" exhibit featured at the Newseum through September 2015.

She also researched and wrote News Zero: The New York Times and The Bomb. Excerpts from and adaptations of this book have been published in two award-winning cover articles in Honolulu's alternative weekly and on global web sites. She is also a co-editor of 15 U.S. News Coverage of Racial Minorities: A Sourcebook, 1934-1996.

In 1969, Beverly Deepe married Charles J. Keever.

== Early life and education ==
Beverly Deepe was born during the height of the Dust Bowl days in 1935 to Doris Widler Deepe and Martin Deepe as they struggled on her grandfather’s mortgaged farm. At a Coon Ridge country school, the youngster was inspired by reading Pearl S. Buck's Good Earth, resulting in a childhood dream of visiting China.

She then entered the University of Nebraska, double-majoring in journalism and political science, graduating in 1957 as Phi Beta Kappa for scholarship and Mortar Board for leadership. She went on to attend Columbia University Graduate School of Journalism, graduating in 1958 with honors.

She worked for two years in New York as an assistant to public-opinion pollster and syndicated columnist, Samuel Lubell. She lived modestly, while learning to travel light and fast, ring doorbells of voters in barometer precincts, analyze election data and develop systematic record-keeping. She carried these skills with her as she traveled to Asia.

To fulfill her childhood fantasy, in 1961, she wrote a Ship-side View of Drab Shanghai from a Polish passenger-carrying steamer. 52 years later, she again visited Shanghai and described the immense advances that had transformed it in its determined push toward a "de–Americanized" world economy.

She later was awarded from the University of Hawaiʻi at Mānoa a Master's degree in Library and Information Studies and a doctorate in American Studies.

== Career ==
=== Journalism ===
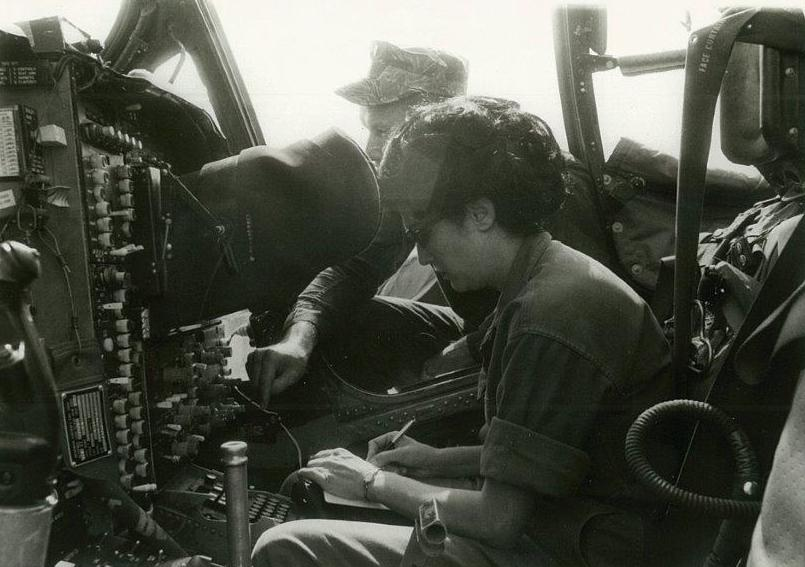
Beverly Deepe Keever with USMC UMA (aco) 242 Sqd of A-6 Intruder out of Danang Airbasse March 12, 1967 with Bomber/Navigator explaining all the electronic gadgets – for Cosmopolitan piece on USMC (which was later published; this photo was not submitted)

Twenty-seven-year-old Beverly Deepe arrived in South Vietnam in early 1962 just as President John F. Kennedy had initiated a new phase of an anti-communist campaign. With this uptick in newsworthiness, she worked as a freelancer without a regular paycheck. She relied on her portable typewriter to write dispatches airmailed on speculation to Associated Press Newsfeatures and other media outlets. Upon her arrival, she was the sole female correspondent among the eight resident Western correspondents. When she departed Vietnam after seven years of continuous reporting, she had outlasted all of them. During that long tenure, she acquired an institutional knowledge and array of valuable local sources, giving her a unique and often lipsticked perspective.

She was among the 467 women correspondents accredited by the U.S. Military command from 1965 to 1973, the years when U.S. combat units arrived and when they departed; of those 467, 267 were American. Scholars assess that with more women covering the Vietnam War than any previous U.S. conflict, it was "a turning point—to some extent a watershed—for American women as war correspondents" and in doing so, "they staked out a lasting place for their gender on the landscape of war."

She helicoptered to Western-styled forts designed to foment communist infiltration along the Laotian border only to learn seven years later of their fall or abandonment. By Jeep and by speedboat along the waterways of the Mekong Delta, she traveled to interview embittered peasants and tenant farmers.

By 1965 with the introduction of American combat troops and squadrons of U.S. aircraft and helicopters, she reported on American and South Vietnam fighters, who often had difficulty detecting friendly folk from hide-and-seek guerrillas as discussed in this documentary aired on Nebraska Public Media in 2023, and produced by Prof. Barney McCoy.

Her Vietnam War reporting included these key dispatches:

- She wrote a number of articles probing why the pro-communist guerrillas fought so hard against the world's superpower over the seven years, consulting her Vietnamese assistants and numerous other sources, dissecting translations of captured documents, and interviewing pro-communists who had defected or been captured.
- In 1962, she was probably the first American correspondent to write about "death zones." She used that chilling term in quoting province chief Maj. Trần Văn Minh, head of the Saigon government's Operation Sunrise that warned the rural population in pro-communist-controlled jungled areas northwest of Saigon to leave their home areas or were forcibly relocated to secured areas because the 40-square-mile pro-communist stronghold was going to be bombed and shelled. The gripping "death zones" term was later sanitized by the U.S. government into the more palatable label of "free-fire zones" needed to obscure the increased number of allied airstrikes and artillery bombardments.
- In 1964 when working for the New York Herald Tribune, she was the first to report on the first-ever detected presence of North Vietnamese fighting units, based on her field trip to the northern city of Danang and interviews with top U.S. and South Vietnamese officers. But the Pentagon and Secretary of Defense Robert McNamara denied her dispatches during this politically sensitive period before the U.S. presidential elections. Months after the election, her articles were officially confirmed, as disclosed in the Pentagon Papers.
- In 1964, her exclusive interviews with Vietnamese prime minister and military strongman Gen. Nguyễn Khánh upset the American Embassy in Saigon and Washington. But she also relayed his prediction that America's policy in Vietnam was so wrong-headed that "The United States will lose Southeast Asia." Time described her "dust-up" with the Embassy and Khanh interviews as "a singular achievement for a girl who has yet to be accepted as a regular in Saigon's corps of foreign correspondents and who had been a Tribune correspondent for only two months," noting that she was the only U.S. reporter not regularly invited to U.S. briefings. Within a year, Khanh was exiled; within a decade the American military and political presence had vanished from South Vietnam, paving the way for a communist take-over.
- In 1965, the New York Herald Tribune published her five-part series on the vital role Vietnamese women played on both sides of the armed conflict and provided a window on the havoc this made-by-men war was disrupting everyday life. The newspaper advertised the series as describing women "surviving amidst a savage, never-ending Holocaust.".
- For a four-part series in the Christian Science Monitor, in January 1968, she rode on the back of a motorcycle driven by a Western correspondent into communist-held territory during an agreed-on ceasefire by both sides to observe their Tet lunar new year celebrations. They were greeted by a veteran Communist Party cadre who had cleared their visit. He revealed the first of two surprises. First he represented both the South Vietnamese government-approved trade union and the pro-communist National Liberation Front, evidencing that a pro-communist supporter or sympathizer had penetrated the government’s own legal labor union. Second was the overt subservience of the supposedly homegrown southern communist guerrillas to North Vietnamese dominance. North Vietnam’s Ho Chi Minh spoke on Radio Hanoi and ended with a poem he had composed for the occasion, proclaiming, “This spring is different from others; more victories are coming.”
- In late 1968 with the pivotal U.S. presidential election approaching, her reporting exposed the conniving between Republican candidate Richard Nixon with the Saigon government to undercut President Johnson’s peace initiative so as to dissuade voters from backing Democrat Hubert Humphrey. In October 1968, she heard such unusual comments that she sent an advisory to the Monitor's overseas editor Hank Hayward. “There’s a report that Vietnamese Ambassador to Washington Bui Diem has notified the Foreign Ministry that Nixon aides have approached him and told him the Saigon government should hold to a firm position now regarding negotiations, and once Nixon is elected he’ll back the Thieu government in their demands.” She asked the Monitor to check out the rumor but heard nothing back. Three days after her advisory, on October 31, President Johnson announced he had ordered a complete bombing halt of North Vietnam and that the first negotiation session with Hanoi was set for November 6, the day after the presidential election. But four days before the presidential election, President Thieu surprisingly rejected Johnson’s peace initiative. In a bombshell televised speech before the Vietnamese National Assembly, Thieu announced South Vietnam would not send a delegation to Paris by November 6, fearing the communists would be seated as a co-equal with his government. She reported his speech was a direct rebuke to President Johnson. On the day before the election, November 4, she cabled the Monitor, “Purported encouragement from the Nixon camp was a significant factor in President Nguyen Van Thieu’s refusal to send a delegation to the Paris peace talks—at least until the American Presidential election is over.” It was an exclusive but it was not published. Years later, in 2018, she was interviewed by Rachel Maddow on MSNBC for a special report, “Betrayal: The Plot That Won The White House,” about her “scoop.”
- In 1968, during the communist country-wide blitz capturing portions of the American Embassy grounds in Saigon, overrunning dozens of provincial towns and exposing the U.S. failed search-and-destroy military strategy, she wrote that the U.S. faced the possibility of losing its first major war in its history. This front-page dispatch in The Christian Science Monitor was later selected by the Columbia University Graduate School of Journalism, her alma mater, as one of the 50 great stories by its alumni in its 100-year history.
- In 1969 she was submitted for a Pulitzer Prize in international reporting by the Christian Science Monitor for her earlier coverage of the embattled Khe Sanh Combat Base while it was being bombarded by communist artillery so skillfully across the border in Laotian mountains that hundreds of sorties of American strategic bombers could not silence the phantom weapons. "Most of Beverly Deepe's readers presume she is a man—for her beat in Vietnam is rough, tough and dangerous," the Monitor's entry letter read. The Pulitzer Prize Committee was then told, "Yet Miss Beverly Ann Deepe, who hails from little Carleton, Nebraska, has been reporting the war and political developments from Saigon and military outposts such as Khe Sanh for seven years now. She holds her own with hosts of masculine correspondents—and asks no favors."
- In 2001 she was among four dozen or so correspondents whose work had been selected for an exhibit to showcase 148 years of war reporting beginning with the Crimean conflict of 1853. Displayed at the Newseum in Washington, D.C, these "War Stories" illustrated "how correspondents deal with the challenge of reporting the facts accurately," especially when their coverage contradicts official announcements, as hers had done. Fourteen years later, her journalistic career was discussed in the "Reporting Vietnam" exhibit at the Newseum through September 12, 2015.
- In this Hawaiʻi Public Radio interview in 2023 with Ann Auman, her former faculty colleague at the University of Hawaiʻi at Mānoa, she discusses some of her Vietnam War dispatches.

=== Academia ===
After Vietnam, she began teaching journalism and communications at the University of Hawaiʻi for 29 years. While teaching, she earned a master's degree in library and information studies and a PhD in American studies. She created numerous instructional materials for her students of public affairs reporting, conducted research and wrote extensively on First Amendment and freedom-of-information issues as described in Let Us Now Praise a Lone Hawaii Voice Fighting for Open Records. She also conducted research and wrote about it that led to publication of three books.

== Selected works ==
Deepe Keever has written a number of books, including:

- Death Zones and Darling Spies: Seven Years of Vietnam War Reporting (2013) – deals with Vietnam War reporting, based on Keever's own experiences and archival research.
- News Zero: The New York Times and The Bomb (Common Courage Press, 2004)
- U.S. News Coverage of Racial Minorities: A Sourcebook, 1934-1996 (co-editor) (Greenwood Press, 1997) – Keever was co-editor of this edited volume, and also co-authored two chapters and contributed two sole-authored chapters.

== Awards and honors ==
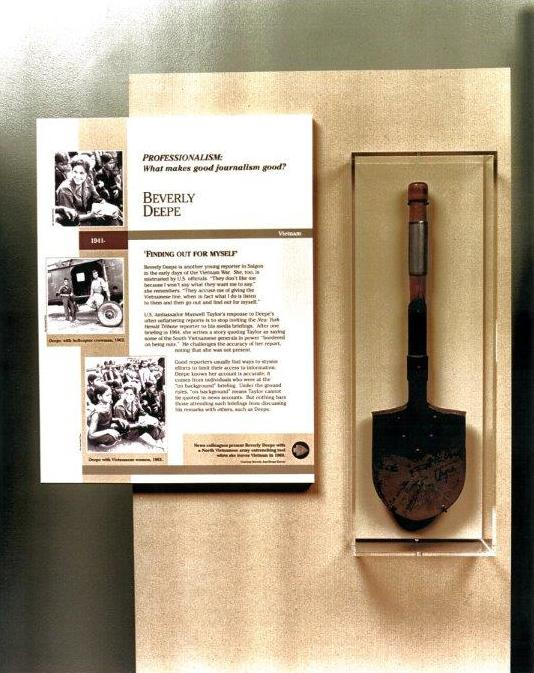
Newseum exhibit featuring B. D. Keever's shovel

She has received the University of Hawaiʻi Regents Medal for Excellence in Teaching, numerous freedom-of-information awards and awards from the alumni associations of two of her alma maters, the University of Nebraska College of Journalism and Mass Communications and the Columbia University Graduate School of Journalism. In March 2015 she was inducted into the Marian Andersen Nebraska Women Journalists' Hall of Fame, housed in Andersen Hall of the College of Journalism and Mass Communications at the University of Nebraska campus. From May through September 12, 2015, the Newseum, blocks from the White House in Washington, included in its "Reporting Vietnam" exhibit her press card issued through the Christian Science Monitor and a North Vietnamese shovel for digging foxholes given to her by fellow correspondents upon her departure from Saigon and a description of her journalistic contributions.
