= High National Council (South Vietnam) =

High National Council of the Republic of Vietnam Thượng Hội đồng Quốc gia Việt Nam Cộng hòa
- 1964
- Flag Emblem
- Anthem: Tiếng gọi Công dân
- Capital: Sài Gòn
- Common languages: Vietnamese, French
- Government: constitutional republic under a military dictatorship
- Chairman
  - September - October 1964: Phan Khắc Sửu
  - October - November: Nguyễn Xuân Chữ
- Secretary-General
  - September - December 1964: Trần Văn Văn
- Historical era: Cold War
  - Established: 8 September 1964
  - Nguyễn Khánh coup: 20 December 1964
- Currency: Đồng
Preceded by	Succeeded by
Revolutionary Military Council (South Vietnam)	National Leadership Committee
- Today part of: Vietnam

The High National Council (Vietnamese: Thượng Hội đồng Quốc gia) (8 September 1964 – 20 December 1964) was a civilian legislative assembly convened by the Military Revolutionary Council (MRC) led by the three generals Dương Văn Minh, Nguyễn Khánh and Trần Thiện Khiêm, under US pressure, after the First Republic led by Ngô Đình Diệm was overthrown by the military junta. Its ultimate objective was to prepare the constitution of the Second Republic of Vietnam. The Council consisted of 16 well-respected citizens: Nguyễn Xuân Chữ, Tôn Thất Hanh, Nguyễn Văn Huyền, Ngô Gia Hy, Nguyễn Đình Luyện, Nguyễn Văn Lực, Trần Đình Nam, Hồ Văn Nhựt, Trần Văn Quế, Lê Khắc Quyến, Phan Khắc Sửu, Lương Trọng Tường, Hồ Đắc Thắng, Lê Văn Thu, Mai Thọ Truyền and Trần Văn Văn.

Phan Khắc Sửu was elected by the Council as its chairman on 27 September 1964, and was nominated as Head of State of South Vietnam on 24 October 1964. The Vice-Chairman was Nguyễn Xuân Chữ, and the General Secretary was Trần Văn Văn. Dr Hồ Văn Nhựt was nominated for the role of Prime Minister of South Vietnam as he had the support from all religious and political parties. It was the first time since the First Republic that this position, of greater power than Head of State, was handed over to a civilian. However, Dr Nhựt wanted a solution for national reconciliation and, after unsatisfactory negotiations with the MRC and American authorities, he declined the offer. Trần Văn Hương, prefect of Saigon, was subsequently appointed Prime Minister. His civilian government was short-lived as it was opposed by Buddhist Uprising and military revolt, resulting in the military reassuming control of the government and dissolving the Council. Thereafter, South Vietnam went through a period of political instability until the Nguyễn Văn Thiệu/Nguyễn Cao Kỳ junta took power in mid-1965.
