= January 1964 South Vietnamese coup =

1964 overthrow of Gen. Dương Văn Minh's military junta in South Vietnam

1965 South Vietnamese coup
- Part of the Vietnam War
Date	January 30, 1964
Location	Saigon, South Vietnam
Result	Coup successful: Đôn, Kim, Đính and Xuân put under house arrest; Nguyễn Văn Nhung summarily executed after the coup

Belligerents
Army of the Republic of Vietnam (ARVN) rebels	Military Revolutionary Council of South Vietnam

Commanders and leaders
Nguyễn Khánh; Trần Thiện Khiêm; Nguyễn Văn Thiệu; Nguyễn Chánh Thi; Đỗ Mậu	Dương Văn Minh; Trần Văn Đôn; Lê Văn Kim; Tôn Thất Đính; Mai Hữu Xuân

Strength
Part of the III Corps and one paratroop unit	None (caught off guard)

Casualties and losses
1 (Nguyễn Văn Nhung)	

Before dawn on January 30, 1964, General Nguyễn Khánh ousted the military junta led by General Dương Văn Minh from the leadership of South Vietnam without firing a shot. It came less than three months after Minh's junta had themselves come to power in a bloody coup against then President Ngô Đình Diệm. The coup took less than a few hours. Major Nguyễn Văn Nhung, who was Minh's aide and bodyguard, was arrested and summarily executed after power had been seized.

Distrusted by his colleagues because of his tendency to change sides and his reputation as an intriguer, Khánh was assigned to I Corps in the far north of the country after Diệm's overthrow to keep him away from the capital Saigon. Khánh, who had played a minor role in Diệm's overthrow, joined forces with Generals Trần Thiện Khiêm and Nguyễn Văn Thiệu, who felt they deserved better posts in the junta, and Colonels Nguyễn Chánh Thi and Đỗ Mậu, the latter being the director of military security under Diệm and an effective strategist.

During the three months of his rule, Minh, his civilian Prime Minister Nguyễn Ngọc Thơ, and his leading military colleagues, Generals Trần Văn Đôn and Lê Văn Kim, attempted to defeat the National Liberation Front (Viet Cong) non-militarily. They felt that a battleground victory was impractical or impossible and pursued a strategy of trying to politically integrate the insurgents into the mainstream. This meant an intensification of rural non-military initiatives and a reduction in armed operations. This brought them into conflict with the United States, which had plans to start bombing North Vietnam. At the same time, in January 1964, the French government of President Charles de Gaulle proposed the neutralization of Vietnam and the withdrawal of American forces. Khánh and his fellow plotters exploited this to spread rumors that Minh's junta was about to make a deal with Hanoi and then gained the support of the US, most notably through the chief of military forces in Vietnam, General Paul Harkins, who supported Diệm and opposed Minh's November coup.

Before dawn on January 30, the coup forces caught the junta completely off-guard and seized power without a fight. Khánh grudgingly decided to keep Minh as a figurehead chief of state while maintaining real power in his hands as Minh was popular within the army and the Americans wanted a show of unity to be maintained. Khánh also tried to consolidate his standing in the military by promoting a group of younger officers, and increasing the pay of the enlisted men. In the meantime, the other key generals in the junta, Don, Kim, Đính and Xuân, were put under house arrest, accused by Khánh of attempting to negotiate a peace deal with North Vietnam. However, when they were brought to a military trial presided over by Khánh, the junta leader did not provide any evidence and convicted them of "lax morality". Khánh then allowed them back to meaningless desk jobs, but the show trial brought him much embarrassment. Khánh later admitted that there was no basis to the charges of neutralism against the four generals, and after a tumultuous year in power, Khánh was himself deposed in February 1965 and forced into exile.

== Background ==
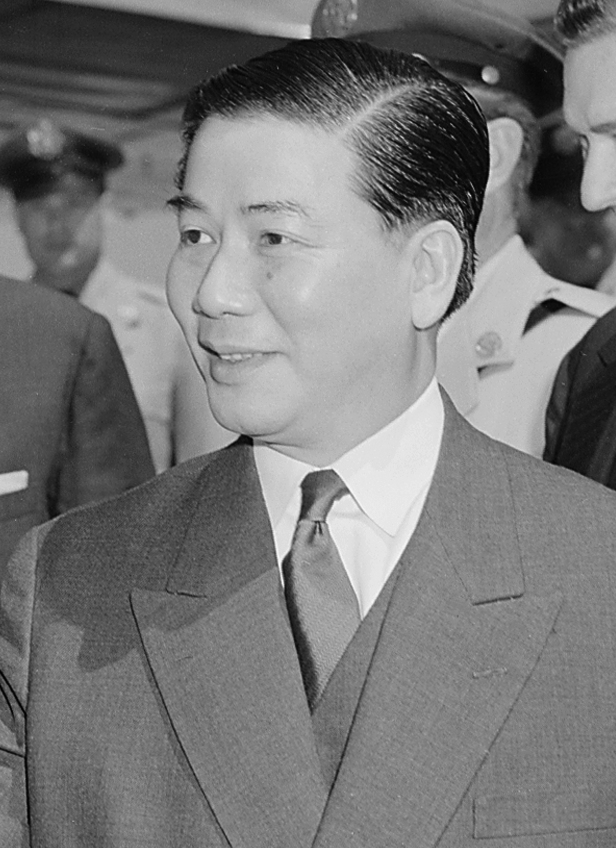
Khánh was distrusted because of his tendency to switch sides and his ambivalent attitude to the coups against Ngô Đình Diệm, the President of South Vietnam from 1955 to 1963.

Khánh had long been regarded as an ambitious and unscrupulous officer. Following the partition of Vietnam, Khánh, a French-trained officer who served in the French-backed Vietnamese National Army during the First Indochina War, had rallied to support Ngô Đình Diệm, who became the first president of the anti-communist South Vietnam (Republic of Vietnam). He rose to become the deputy chief of staff in the Army of the Republic of Vietnam (ARVN), but his record of political loyalty was called into question. In 1960, during an attempted coup by rebel paratroopers, Khánh jumped over the walls of the Independence Palace and joined Diệm during the siege, trying to negotiate an end to the stand-off with the rebels. Khánh parleyed with the rebels long enough for loyal forces to arrive from the outside the capital to suppress the uprising, but his critics contended that he was waiting to see which side would gain the upper hand and was not committed to Diệm. In any case, Diệm then promoted him to be the commander of II Corps. In his younger days, Khánh had joined the Việt Minh but then defected to the French colonial army after a year. Khánh claimed that he had left the Viet Minh because of its communist inclinations, but critics claimed that he was simply switching sides because the French-backed State of Vietnam offered him more opportunities for advancement.

Khánh participated in the 1963 South Vietnamese coup that deposed Diệm, playing a minor role, although he claimed to be a key player. Khánh expected a large reward, but the junta instead sidelined him, excluding him from the twelve-man Military Revolutionary Council. In mid-December he was moved from the II Corps in the Central Highlands to the command of the I Corps based around Huế and Da Nang in the far north of the Republic of Vietnam. This, it was speculated, was to keep him far away from Saigon in an attempt to stop him from involving himself in politics. This was contrary to Khánh's request for a transfer to the IV Corps in the Mekong Delta close to Saigon, where most of the fighting was taking place. In an interview with journalist Robert Shaplen, Khánh made no attempt to hide his annoyance at not being given a more important job. With respect to the 1963 coup that overthrew and killed Diệm, he cryptically commented "It is too soon yet to tell the whole story, but someday I will tell it to you". The Central Intelligence Agency (CIA) also reported that Khánh was motivated by a suspicion that Minh's junta knew he was untrustworthy and was going to give him an overseas government post to sideline him completely.

=== Harkins and his support for Khánh ===
Luckily for Khánh, although his colleagues did not like or trust him, the Americans, civilian and military regarded him highly. Most notable among his supporters was the US commander, General Paul Harkins, who regarded Minh and his colleagues as "political generals" and thought poorly of them, in contrast to Khánh, who he regarded as a serious soldier. Harkins prepared quarters for Khánh next to his own when the Vietnamese officer visited the capital. Harkins also mistakenly believed that Khánh was happy to have been posted to I Corps and content to focus on military matters rather than politics, unaware of Khánh's anger at being sidelined from Saigon. The US commander thought that Khánh had done an effective job in I Corps, restoring it to normality after the upheavals of Diệm's final months in power.

Like Khánh, Harkins was not on good terms with the junta. With respect to the overthrow of Diệm, Ambassador Henry Cabot Lodge Jr. and elements in the US State Department were in favor of regime change, while the US military leadership supported Diệm's retention. It was well known to Minh and his close supporters that Harkins had strongly opposed the coup and tried to stop it. As a result, they distrusted him as a "symbol of the old order" and did not "look for advice" from Pentagon officials. Lacking influence on the new government, Harkins fell significantly behind Lodge as the leading American in Saigon. According to Kahin, the two were never close and "if prior to the ouster of Diệm they appeared to be estranged team members, thereafter they hardly seemed to be on the same team." In a report to US President Lyndon Baines Johnson in December 1963, McNamara claimed that "The Country Team is the second major weakness [after the Minh government]. It lacks leadership and is not working to a common plan...Above all Lodge has virtually no official contact with Harkins. Lodge sends in reports with major military implications without showing them to Harkins."

Harkins resented his decreasing relevance, especially as his term in Vietnam would be over in six months anyway, so he decided to try to regain influence lost to Lodge by altering the shape of the Saigon regime. The split between Harkins and Lodge was also kept unresolved by domestic political imperatives in Washington. The Defense Department would not drop their support for Harkins, so he was not recalled early. Although Johnson said of Lodge "He ain't worth a damn. He can't work with anybody. He won't let anybody else work", the president chose not to try to force any changes due to the upcoming US Presidential election. Lodge was the front-runner for the Republican nomination at the time, and Johnson wanted to keep him in Saigon rather than having the ambassador in the US campaigning against him and the Democratic Party. Aside from Harkins, General Maxwell Taylor, the Chairman of the Joint Chiefs of Staff, was also known to regard Khánh as the nation's foremost general, while Undersecretary of State George Ball told Lodge that "Our [the State Department's] impression is that Khánh is one of the best of the generals, both courageous and sophisticated." Khánh was known for his pro-American views, and Lodge's aide, Colonel Mike Dunn said that Khánh was not only a fluent speaker of English, but "he spoke American; American Army in fact." On one occasion Khánh had told American officials that South Vietnam "must rely on American support".

At the time, the South Vietnamese government was plagued by infighting. A civilian government and cabinet led by Prime Minister Nguyễn Ngọc Thơ was appointed by the MRC to ease some of the workload on non-military matters. However, the presence of Generals Trần Văn Đôn and Tôn Thất Đính in both the civilian cabinet and the MRC paralyzed the governance process. Đính and Đôn were subordinate to Thơ in the cabinet, but as members of the MRC they were superior to him. Whenever Thơ gave an order in the civilian hierarchy with which they disagreed, they would go into the MRC and give a counter-order. The junta was paralyzed because all twelve generals in the MRC had equal power. Each member of the MRC had the power of veto, enabling them to stonewall policy decisions. The press strongly attacked Thơ, accusing his government of being "tools" of the MRC. The media further derided Thơ for the personal benefits that he gained as a landlord from the Diệm administration's token land reform policy. On January 1, 1964, a Council of Notables comprising sixty leading citizens met for the first time. Its job was to advise the military and civilian wings of the government with a view towards reforming human rights, the constitution and the legal system. The council, which consisted almost entirely of professionals and academic leaders, soon became engaged in endless debate and never achieved its initial task of drafting a new constitution.

=== Ineffective junta rule ===
The provisional government lacked direction in policy and planning, resulting in it quickly losing control. Minh was criticized for being lethargic and uninterested in running the country. The number of rural attacks instigated by the Viet Cong surged in the wake of Diệm's deposal, partly due to the displacement of troops into urban areas for the coup. The increasingly free discussion generated from the surfacing of new and accurate data following the coup revealed that the military situation was far worse than what was reported by Diệm. The incidence of Viet Cong attacks continued to increase as it had done during 1963, the weapons loss ratio worsened and the rate of Viet Cong defections fell. The units that participated in the coup were returned to the field to guard against a possible major communist offensive in the countryside. The falsification and inflation of military statistics by Diệm's officials had led to miscalculations, which manifested themselves in military setbacks after Diệm's death. Khánh claimed that "After the November coup, there was much relaxation, wining and dining, and little prosecution of the war effort." Khánh claimed that he had built up intelligence infrastructure to weed out the Viet Cong under Diệm's rule, but that the other generals had disbanded it and released communist prisoners.

At the same time, Thơ was also becoming unpopular in the military establishment. One of the goals of the coup plots at the time was to remove Tho and the prime minister's unpopularity helped to distract some of the incumbent officers from the fact that they were the primary target—at the time, the MRC was moving towards removing Tho, and Minh was the only senior general to still have confidence in him. A more important reason for the incumbent generals' lack of preparedness for Khánh's coup was their misunderstanding of the US stance. After what had happened to Diệm, as well as other failed coup attempts, they regarded American backing as the decisive factor for the survival of any government and the success of any coup. As a result, repeated assurances from Lodge and Johnson's laudatory comments in private and public convinced them that they remained on firm ground. Johnson had told Lodge to assure Minh in a meeting on January 1, 1964, that he had "the complete support of the United States as the leader of Vietnam [emphasis in the original]".

=== The junta's policy conflicts with the US ===
Aside from non-military problems facing the junta, it also came into conflict with the Americans over political strategy, most notably as to whether armed force or politics should be the focus of efforts to end the communist threat to South Vietnam. Minh, the leading generals and Tho, favored a politically oriented solution, feeling that the deposal of Diệm and Nhu had created new possibilities for ending the insurgency of the National Liberation Front, or Viet Cong, mainly through an outreach program. They thought that military force would not be sufficient for Saigon, and that political means were more effective than using American firepower in making up for this. To the junta leaders, the rapid growth of the insurgency in Diệm's final year was due to it being seen as a rallying point and symbol of opposition to Diệm and Nhu, rather than an endorsement of the communists. The senior junta generals believed that with the Ngô brothers dead, the insurgency was now without its major focus of opposition, and therefore, motivation to operate in a vigorous way. To them, most of the insurgents were non-communist, with heavy elements of Cao Đài and Hòa Hảo religious sects or other opposition that had joined because of passionate anti-Diệm sentiment. Minh thus saw the post-Diệm period as an opportunity for grassroots political strengthening to undercut the NLF support base and force the remainder to integrate into mainstream society due to political realities.

Minh and his closest supporters tended to view regard Huỳnh Tấn Phát, Nguyễn Hữu Thọ and the other nominal NLF leaders as "former bourgeois colleagues" and moderate, nationalist non-communists who were uncomfortable with a foreign presence in South Vietnam, and whose political views had remained largely unchanged since their departure for the jungle a few years before. Minh's group thus believed that the NLF could be peacefully reintegrated into mainstream politics. After his overthrow, Tho said that his administration wanted to win over the religious sects and the Cambodian minority in the Mekong Delta who had felt alienated by Diệm, as according to him, avowed communists were a weak minority in the NLF. This would then make the communists irrelevant in a free electoral process in a normal peaceful society with a pro-western foreign policy that was not hardline anti-communist. According to Tho, this plan was not a deal with communists or the NLF as his group saw it as a political attempt to coax back non-communist dissidents and isolate those that were communists. Minh and Đôn also later described similar plans and said that they believed the Americans had become aware of this and grown hostile to them.

At the same time, in accordance with the political strategy, Minh's junta was reluctant to carry out large-scale offensives, which concerned the Americans, particularly Harkins, Taylor and CIA chief John McCone. While Harkins and Taylor had opposed Diệm's ouster, the junta's policies also disappointed many supporters of the anti-Diệm coup as they saw regime change as necessary to their hopes of a more aggressive anti-communist war. For their part, Minh's leadership group believed that a more low-key military approach was needed for their political campaign against the insurgency.

During the latter part of Diệm's rule, a centerpiece of the rural pacification campaign was the large-scale construction of strategic hamlets, whereby villagers were compelled to move into fortified camps in an attempt to lock out insurgents. However this failed as many were able to infiltrate the settlements, whereas a previous implementation of such principles in Malaya had been successful as the local communists were ethnic Chinese who were physically distinguishable from the anti-communist ethnic majority. It also angered the peasants, who were forced to abandon their ancestral lands and homes, and build new dwellings in the new villages. Many of these hamlets were subsequently overrun in communist attacks, something many villagers found to their liking. General Lê Văn Kim oversaw the future of the program for Minh and it was decided to liberalize the system to try to win over the peasants. They forecast that they could reduce the insurgency's support by 30% alone through these less restrictive arrangements, citing more cooperative attitudes in Mekong Delta regions heavily populated with Hòa Hảo and Cao Đài. However this upset and aroused suspicions among the Americans.

Minh's administration also opposed a proposed increase to US military and civilian advisers into district and village level, maintaining that this would give the impression of colonialism and that a low-key approach was more advisable and would not provoke resentment. This caused great concern among the Americans. In December McNamara and McCone visited Vietnam and wrote a very pessimistic report to Washington expressing concern at the effectiveness of the current policies in Saigon with respect to military gains and rural consolidation, and whether it would lead to a communist takeover. Đôn said that under orders from Harkins, the US officers attached to the four corps commanders had been vigorously trying to convince them of the need to bomb North Vietnam, and by implication, the need to have a coup due to the incumbent government's refusal to allow a bombing campaign. Đôn claimed that such lobbying was influential in convincing some officers to join the coup.

Most notably the Saigon junta opposed US proposals to escalate the war with a large-scale bombing campaign against North Vietnam, as advocated by the US Joint Chiefs of Staff. This plan called for the use of American resources badged as South Vietnamese. This was objected to on the grounds that it would lose moral capital for Saigon as they promoted their cause as just and compatible with the physical safety of fellow Vietnamese, as well as fears that it would provoke a communist land invasion from the north.

The Americans became increasingly worried about the growing chasm in the outlook towards the war, and on advice from his advisers, Johnson described neutralism as "another name for a Communist takeover" in a New Year's message to Minh. As Minh remained adamant about these policies, Roger Hilsman and Lodge, the main proponents of removing Diệm, began to lose confidence in the junta, joining the military establishment, who had opposed the coup against Diệm in the first place. In a January 21 meeting between Harkins, Lodge, Minh, Kim and Tho, the Americans mooted a plan to bomb North Vietnam and were explicitly rebuffed by Minh, who thought that such actions would result in escalation and be counterproductive, possibly inducing a Chinese land incursion akin to what had happened during the Korean War. The Australian historian Anne E. Blair identified this meeting as sealing Minh's political "death warrant" because when Lodge reported the meeting to Washington, the leading generals in the US military lobbied McNamara claiming that it was no longer feasible to work within the parameters laid out by Saigon and that the US should simply take control of anti-communist military policy.

There was also growing concern that the calls by Prince Sihanouk of Cambodia for the neutralization of his own country, and his attempts to convene an international conference on the matter, would increase such sentiment in Vietnam, something that was oft-repeated in the American media. Minh publicly opposed Sihanouk's ideas and similar plans mooted by French President Charles de Gaulle, but discussion of the concepts continued to grow.

== First moves ==
About a month before Minh's junta was overthrown, Khánh was approached by one of the principal tacticians in the removal of Diệm, General Đỗ Mậu. A colonel at the time of the previous coup, Mậu had been head of military security under Diệm. Although he did not explicitly command troops, Mậu had a thorough knowledge of the backgrounds of most of the senior ARVN officers and their strengths and weaknesses. This had allowed him to help engineer the previous coup. The MRC respected Mậu, but their fears about his shrewdness led them to place him in the relatively powerless post of Minister of Information. Mậu's closest aides were posted further away from any real power in an attempt to fragment his networks of influence. Mậu began to search for officers to replace the junta, searching for exiles in Cambodia and France as well as those who had returned to Vietnam after the overthrow of Diệm. The most important link in Mậu's plan was Colonel Nguyễn Chánh Thi, the former paratroop commander who had fled to Cambodia in the wake of the failed 1960 coup attempt against Diệm. Mậu persuaded the junta to install Thi as Khánh's deputy in I Corps. He tricked the junta into doing so by reasoning that as Khánh had largely been responsible for putting down the 1960 revolt, Thi would be an ideal mechanism for keeping Khánh in check, claiming that the two would be implacably opposed to one another. Privately, Mậu predicted that Thi would be a bridge between him in Saigon and Khánh in Huế. He was correct in thinking that the 1960 conflict would be irrelevant in the shifting of allegiances over time and that the pair would work together for their current aims of advancement. Mậu recruited a second figure in the form of General Trần Thiện Khiêm, who was one of Khánh's fellow cadets and had worked with Mậu during the November coup. Khiêm had assisted Diệm in putting down the 1960 plot and had since been demoted from being Chief of Staff of the ARVN to the commander of the III Corps that surrounded Saigon. Khiêm readily joined the plot and controlled the 5th and 7th Divisions of the ARVN, which were based in Biên Hòa and Mỹ Tho north and south of Saigon respectively. This brought the two division commanders subordinate to Khiêm into the plot, as long as they would obey his orders. Khiêm, Khánh and Mậu kept in touch surreptitiously on a regular basis, supplementing their forces with an assortment of Marine, Air Force and Special Forces officers. Another was General Dương Văn Đức, who had recently returned from exile in Paris and was an assistant to Kim, the chief of the junta's general staff. During this time, the plotters received encouragement from Harkins through their American advisers, something seen as crucial to the plot's increasing momentum.

Among the notable recruits were several officers who had been prominent Diệm loyalists and were then cashiered or demoted soon after Minh's junta took charge. Others loyal to Diệm then became fearful that they would soon be removed too. Minh's junta proceeded slowly and gradually, hoping to avoid pre-emptive coups by officers fearing a demotion or sacking. However, their public drive against military corruption deeply worried Diệm loyalists who had bad reputations. A CIA report on December 7, 1963, concluded that "however desirable and perhaps even necessary" such a "threatened purge of corrupt elements from the ranks of the military establishment from a long term point of view...in the short term" it could be anticipated to cause a "disruptive effect on the solidarity of the military establishment."

Among those who did join the coup was the chief of the Civil Guard, Duong Ngoc Lam, a Diệm loyalist who had recently been promoted from colonel to brigadier general. He was under investigation by the junta for swindling military funds and was readily converted.

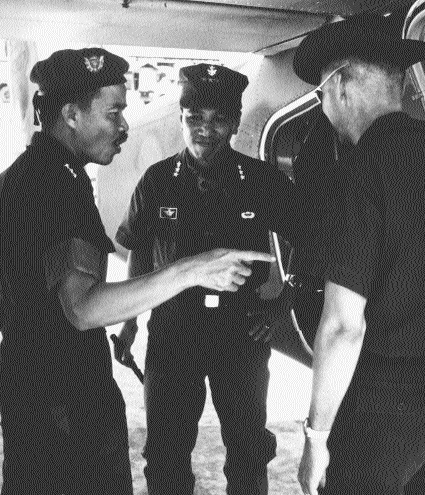
Thi (left) and Thiệu (right) during the 1960s. Both were prominent in supporting Khánh's coup.

During Minh's brief rule, several changes were made to military units in the capital that played into the hands of Khánh's group. Following the removal of Diệm, the protection for incumbent rulers in Saigon also decreased. The Presidential Guard that Diệm used to protect Gia Long Palace against coups was dissolved and sent into the countryside, as were units of the ARVN Rangers, which had been kept in the capital for the same purpose. A significant boost to the plotter's scheme came on January 5, when Dinh relinquished command of the III Corps to Khiêm following persistent pressure by the US military establishment that he needed to fully concentrate on his work as interior minister. Khiêm took over and was now in accord with the subordinate 5th and 7th Division commanders Nguyễn Văn Thiệu and Lâm Văn Phát, both of whom played a large part in the coup forces. Dinh later reflected that his replacement by Khiêm was "a prelude to the coup" while Đôn said that it gave Khiêm a concrete base from which to organize a putsch. Khiêm had long been disgruntled with his position in the post-Diệm regime, as was Thieu, and had been planning a coup of his own.

As the coup plot began to solidify, Khánh came to the fore of the group. It has been concluded by some analysts that Khiêm—who went on to be Khánh's second in command in terms of real power after the coup was successful—was more pre-eminent during the early phases of the planning, but that as a Catholic who had been rapidly promoted by Diệm after changing religion, he "did not dare to carry out a coup d'état himself out of fear that the Buddhists would react strongly against him and accuse him of trying to reestablish the Ngô Regime." Another factor seen as vital in bringing Khánh to the forefront of the coup group was that the US military leadership deemed Khánh more capable than Khiêm and equally likely to work in accordance with US interests. Khánh was highly regarded by Harkins, who thought of him as "the strongest of all corps commanders." According to a CIA assessment, Khánh had been "consistently favorable to U.S. programs and advice".

=== Rumor campaign ===
In late December and early January, student demonstrations in South Vietnam were held against neutralism and French President Charles de Gaulle, who advocated the removal of the Americans and negotiations between the two Vietnams. The Council of Notables had accused the provisional government and junta of having an uncertain stance on the issue and went as far as to recommend that South Vietnam suspend diplomatic relations with France. The rumors and crisis heightened when a reputed French agent, Lieutenant Colonel Tran Dinh Lan suddenly returned to Saigon after several years in France. He had served in both the French and Vietnamese National Army and had brought with him several million US dollars' worth of South Vietnamese piasters. Lan moved into the home of one of Kim's top aides, fuelling speculation that French agents were being systematically brought into the capital. Such rumors served to spread the belief that a French-sponsored neutralist deal was imminent and gave the conspirators an opportunity to act.

Duc had years of experience in France, which had given him a good feel of how the French might be thinking and what their relations with Francophile members of the ARVN might resemble. He used this to concoct some plausible sounding and incriminating documents for Mậu. They purported to show that three prominent members of the junta: Generals Minh, Kim and Đôn had been bought by French agents and were on the brink of declaring South Vietnam's neutrality and signing a peace deal to end the war with the North. Some of the documents were leaked to elements of the American presence in Saigon and were brought to the attention of some senior American officials.

Khánh held a number of meetings with American officers in Huế during the first two weeks of January. In addition to routine military matters, coup discussions were also reported to have taken place. Khánh also regularly flew down to Saigon to take part in plotting with his colleagues. These usually took place in the secluded house of a colonel who was a nearby province chief. Meetings were also held at Khánh's headquarters in Huế. Khánh began growing a small goatee, which he customarily grew when he was attempting a new project and would only shave once the job had been completed.

During this time, Khánh spread rumors in the capital that the French were behind a plan to install a pro-communist government that would implement de Gaulle's plans for the neutralization of Vietnam. Helping Khánh in a concerted smear campaign were Khiêm and Thieu. The French Foreign Office had announced that Paris would establish diplomatic relations with Peking on January 28, and Khánh used this as an opportunity to play on American anti-neutralist sentiment. De Gaulle's attempt to cultivate relations with communist China was tied to his policy of calling on US troops to leave Vietnam.

Khánh told various American officials that Đôn, Kim and General Mai Hữu Xuân, along with Minh, were "pro-French and pro-neutralist" and part of de Gaulle's plan. Khánh claimed that the fact that Đôn had invited two members of the French National Assembly—both from de Gaulle's party—to dinner. According to one source, Kim and Minh were also present, while another says that Kim, Đính and Xuân were there. Khánh alleged at the time that the generals discussed neutralization there, while Đôn and Đính always denied it. Another incident that occurred publicly was a January trip by Đôn and Đính to Thailand's capital Bangkok for a military event was a press conference at which Đôn did not rule out de Gaulle's plan if it applied to both Vietnams equally.

The Bangkok and dinner incidents were believed to have been part of the basis for a report by Giovanni D'Orlandi, the Italian Ambassador in Saigon, passed on by Lodge to Washington on January 20. It alleged that Đôn and Đính were potential leaders of a group that might go along with de Gaulle's neutralization plan. At the time, Lodge said that his office had no solid evidence that either of the pair was contemplating neutralization, but just after the coup, he cabled Washington to say he was rethinking his position. He said that Đôn and Kim retained their French citizenship and "had never at any time foresworn the possibility of a neutral solution at what might seem to them the proper time." He said that although he thought their policies against the communists were effective, "none of us had ever discussed what the next step would be after the Government of Vietnam had reached a position of strength. Perhaps they did favor the French neutrality solution at that time." On the other hand, Undersecretary of State W. Averell Harriman had been told by staffers that the claims were merely a smokescreen disseminated by Khánh and his followers to gain support for a power grab. Lodge's personal staff had also failed to find evidence substantiating Khánh's charges. Lodge had put embassy employee Frederick Flott in charge of American-French liaison in South Vietnam. Flott found nothing to support the claims of a linkage between de Gaulle's proposal and Minh's junta and reported that many French contacts had bemoaned their lack of success in rallying Minh's administration to de Gaulle's proposal.

== Final preparations ==
On January 28, Khánh flew from Huế to Saigon dressed in civilian clothes on a commercial airliner. He covered for his ruse by claiming that he was travelling with United States military adviser Colonel Jasper Wilson and stating that he had come for a dental appointment. This came after Duc had arrived in I Corps earlier in the day with a message from the other plotters that Khánh was to be in Saigon to lead the coup on the day after. What Khánh had actually done was to send Wilson to Saigon earlier in the day to check with the embassy and confirm that Washington did support the coup.

Through Wilson, Khánh told Lodge that he possessed documents proving that Đôn, Kim and Xuân were about to stage a coup and neutralize South Vietnam. He asserted that their planning involved talks with France. Khánh claimed that pre-emption was needed because if the plot was not stopped immediately crushed, it was a realistic chance of success as a "neutralist platform might strike [a] responsive chord among junior officers." Wilson then phoned Khánh at 15:00 to confirm that Military Assistance Command, Vietnam (MACV) and the embassy did not object, using a predetermined codeword to convey the endorsement to Khánh.

It was later revealed that Harkins had reported in a cable that Wilson had seen him around 15:00 on behalf of Khánh to determine whether Washington would support a "counter-coup" against those who "planned to seize control and immediately announce a position of neutralization". Harkins stated that he ordered Wilson to report to Lodge. Harkins then reported that he was undertaking "a field trip", believed to be an attempt to lobby Saigon-based forces to join the coup. Harkins was later reported to have said in response to Khánh's asking whether he objected to a coup, "No, I think you are a very fine general." Afterwards, when asked why he had not tipped off the junta, Harkins said that the ruling officers "weren't getting along anyway, so maybe it was a change for the better. I thought it was."

Khánh flew into Saigon after Wilson's confirmation, and stayed at the house of a friend and waited for the coup, which was scheduled the coup for 04:00 January 30. According to the plan, Khiêm's forces in Saigon would surround the homes of the sleeping junta members while Khánh and a paratrooper unit would occupy the Joint General Staff headquarters near Tan Son Nhut Air Base. Thi followed Khánh to the capital on the same day, and the plotters met in obscure places around town.

At this time, there was one major obstacle, the armored units in the capital and its outskirts. The plotters needed help from Colonel Dương Hiếu Nghĩa, one of the leading Đại Việt officers and temporary head of the Capital Armored Command, who was key to the coup's success. A friend and appointee of Minh, Nghia caused difficulties by failing to respond to Thiệu's order that all armor be moved north out of Saigon to Thiệu's 5th Division headquarters at Biên Hòa, a satellite city on the northeastern edge of the capital. A CIA cable reported that Nghia was aware that the movements were part of a coup against Minh and told Thieu that he would not deploy out of the capital and declared his support for Minh. This caught the plotters off guard, and as Harkins left on his "fieldtrip" at the same time, Kahin conjectured that he had actually gone to lobby Nghia to support the coup or at least partially back it by agreeing to help depose Minh's confidants Đôn, Đính, Kim and Xuân. However, it was then reported that Nghia had agreed to support Thieu, who had apparently then gained the control of both the armored and marine elements in Saigon. He also gained the cooperation of Lieutenant Colonel Lý Tòng Bá, the commander of the 6th Armored Squadron and Brigadier General Lâm Văn Phát, the Catholic and Diệm-loyalist commander of the 7th Division, which along with the Thieu's 5th Division was part of Khiêm's III Corps. Harkins returned from his expedition on the same day and met Lodge, who told him of Khánh's more recent meeting with Wilson. Less than two hours before the coup took place, in the middle of the night, Lodge told Harkins of the time that the coup would begin and the location of the coup command post.

== Coup ==
On the night of January 29, Mậu and Khiêm alerted the rebel troops to assume their positions around Saigon. These included many of those used in the first coup: armored cars and tanks and some elements from the 5th and 7th Divisions, two airborne battalions and one Marine battalion and an assortment of Special Forces, Ranger and Civil Guard units. A number of American officers and embassy officials were alerted to be in their offices at 02:00. Lodge was kept fully informed throughout the night. As the time approached, Khánh donned his paratrooper uniform and headed to the military headquarters at Tan Son Nhut, where he saw that the compound was empty apart from a few guards. When he telephoned Khiêm, he found that his co-conspirator had overslept after having forgotten to set his alarm clock. Despite this, by daybreak, Khánh had taken over the government without a shot being fired.

Khánh used the coup to enact retribution against Minh's leading generals. Khánh had Kim, Đôn, Đính and Xuân arrested, claiming that they were part of a neutralist plot with the French. Khánh noted that they had served in the Vietnamese National Army in the early 1950s, under the French colonial administration, although he did as well. Lan was also arrested as a suspected French agent. The junta members were caught totally unaware. Minh, Đôn and Kim woke up to find hostile forces surrounding their houses and thought it to be a quixotic stunt by some disgruntled young officers.

Tho was apprehended during the coup and put under house arrest while the plotters consolidated their grip on power; he was then removed from the political scene. General Nguyen Van Vy, who had returned from France after Diệm's deposal to serve as Deputy Chief of Staff for training, was put under house arrest before being released within a day of the coup's success.

Colonel Nghia showed his mixed feelings about the junta with the selective use of his armored troops. They supported Khánh's move against Đính, Đôn, Kim and Xuân, but tried to protect Minh by using tanks to shield Minh's house from Lam's Civil Guard units, which were also used to arrest the four other leading junta members. Although Minh was taken away, this was claimed to be a protective measure to shield him from some of Khánh's more hawkish supporters, and he was never formally arrested and taken into detention. Throughout the morning the deposed officers were taken one by one to JGS headquarters by the plotters. The generals were then flown to My Khe beach, near Da Nang.

Wilson accompanied Khánh and reported the coup's progress to Lodge roughly twice an hour. The US ambassador then relayed the information promptly to Washington. For 90 minutes up until 06:00, Wilson reported that matters were on track. During the early stages of the coup, the Airborne Brigade command post was used as the headquarters of the rebels, before they set up at JGS headquarters after matters were stabilized. At 06:10 Khiêm arrived at the Airborne Brigade command post to join Khánh and 35 minutes later the IV Corps commander, General Nguyễn Hữu Có came to join the coup. Paratroopers and infantry cut off the roads into the city to prevent any would-be loyalist units from storming into the capital, but no such attempt was made. In total, 3,000 troops from eight battalions were involved in the coup and tanks were brought in from Mỹ Tho to the south.

General Nguyễn Văn Chuân was invited to the coup headquarters by Khiêm after the takeover was complete. He recalled that there were 15–20 Vietnamese officers present along with Khánh and Khiêm, and that many had been placed on leave without pay or removed after Diệm's overthrow. Chuan said that Khánh chaired a meeting, and claimed that Minh's government was "neutralist, pro-Communist and pro-French", and incompetent. He said that the plotters "didn't know what to call the coup d'état to make it sound all right; it was only a while later that they thought of the term 'rectification'". Wilson was present at the meeting and telephoned Harkins "every five minutes", and Khánh left the meeting early and left Khiêm in charge, saying that he had to meet Harkins. During the meeting, Thieu and Mậu turned up by 08:40 and the atmosphere of the meeting was likened to a triumphant election campaign function on vote-counting night. Before leaving and telling the others he was meeting Harkins, Khánh had announced to the officers in the room that he would be heavily dependent on US advice and support.

Chuan said that the obvious characteristic of the plotters assembled at the JGS headquarters was "the heavy involvement of the Harkins group...this action was not being carried out independently...[but] was directed by foreigners." He concluded that Minh had been overthrown by the Americans for opposing their plan to expand the war and the US military presence. Bui Diệm, the future South Vietnamese Ambassador to the US, reflected years later that many people knew of the coup and the lack of action on the part of American officials was a sure indication of encouragement for Khánh.

During the pre-dawn coup and throughout the day, there was little reaction by the public who went about their daily life as though nothing had happened. Many appeared unaware that a coup had occurred while they were still sleeping. There was no disruption to road traffic or the media, and although flights were halted in the morning, they resumed in the afternoon. There were plans to enact a curfew but this was abandoned.

== Reaction and aftermath ==
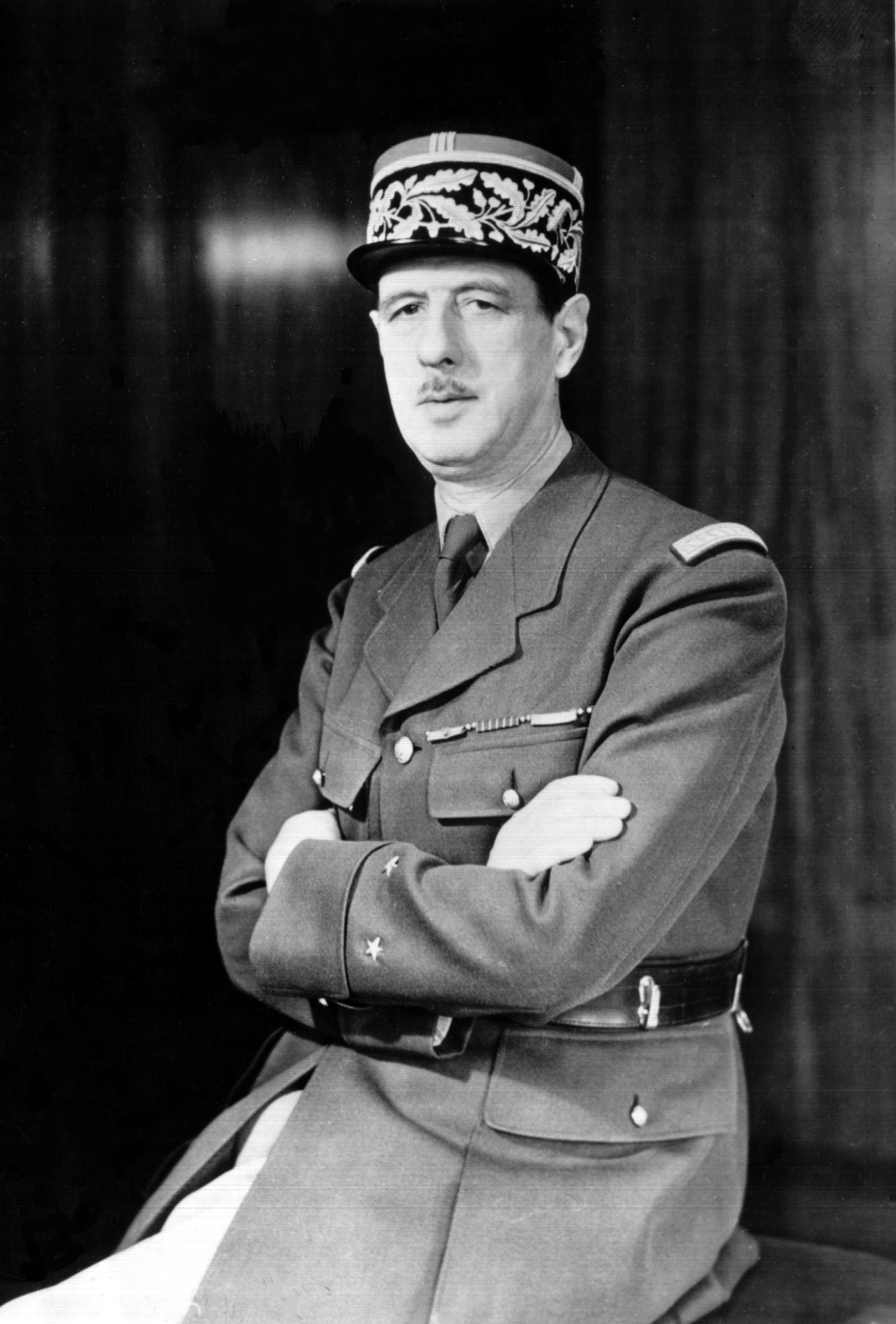
At the time Charles de Gaulle wanted to recognize communist China and make South Vietnam neutral. The plotters accused the ruling junta of being part of de Gaulle's plot.

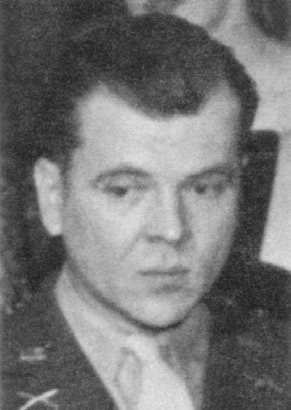
Khánh had told CIA officer Lucien Conein (pictured) that he planned to seize power, but senior US officials in Washington ignored Conein's report.

US officials in Washington were surprised by the coup. Although Khánh had already told CIA officer Lucien Conein—who helped to plan the coup against Diệm—in December 1963 that he intended to overthrow Minh, the report was filed away among the many rumors that were received by American representatives.

Following the coup, Khánh was promoted by the Americans—in both the media and government—as South Vietnam's new hope. Khánh was generally portrayed in the American media—which was widely supportive of the change in Saigon's leadership—as a "strong man". Khánh presented himself as a robust and aggressive officer and was shown in photographs wearing his paratrooper's uniform. The newspapers had been strongly critical of Minh and went along with Khánh's claim that he would "fight Communism to the final victory" and that the change was a turning point for the better.

Khánh had a meeting with Lodge in the morning of the coup for around an hour after arranging a meeting through Wilson. Due to concerns as to whether Washington would express support for the coup and what the official policy was, the meeting was not held at the embassy but at the home of Lodge's aide Dunn. However, if Lodge was concerned about keeping a low profile regarding the coup, Khánh was not, arriving at Dunn's residence with seven jeeploads of aides before embracing Lodge. He told Lodge that he would go after the communists aggressively and that the coup would not disrupt the military in any significant way. Khánh vowed to intensify the war effort, ask Lodge for guidance constantly, introduce democracy and install a direct phone line between Vietnamese military headquarters and the US Embassy. Lodge also reported that Khánh wanted to give the impression that he seriously thought that neutralist deal involving de Gaulle was a genuine and ominous prospect, and that de Gaulle had made much progress in influencing the previous administration.

In the immediate aftermath of the coup, Lodge claimed that the US had "nothing to do with the operation" and would not speculate on how the coup might affect policy in Washington. Blair said that "Lodge's role in the coup...[was] largely a passive one. He gave no "green light" to the conspirators, nor did he liaise with them." After Khánh's seizure of power, Vietnamese military officers referred to the leadership change as "Harkins's Revenge" or "The Pentagon's Coup". All the main Vietnamese figures from both sides, including Khánh himself, Minh, Đôn, Đính and Tho all agreed in later years that the US was heavily and decisively involved and that a coup would have otherwise been impossible.

In his first radio broadcast upon seizing power, which did not occur until 16:00, Khánh assailed the former regime for its performance during its three months at the top. He said "The political, economic, and social situation in the countryside still offers no promising prospect. There has not been one single compensation worthy of the sacrifices accepted daily by the soldiers." He alluded to a neutralist plot, claiming that "some persons" had joined "with the colonialists standing for neutralism in order to pave the way for the Communists to enslave us". Khánh's broadcast was signed by 17 generals and 32 other senior officers. Many observers were immediately sceptical of the claims of neutralism and regarded personal ambition as the motivating factor all along. An anonymous source close to the plotters told The New York Times that "We were anxious about them indeed...and we had conclusive proof that they had been talking with the French in terms of a neutralized Vietnam and that North Vietnam had given support to the plan", explicitly naming Kim and Xuân.

It was not clear whether the Department of State or Lodge was enthusiastic about the political change in Saigon at the time, but if they were not, they were handed a fait accompli. A CIA report from Saigon soon after the seizure of power told the State Department that "It is safe to say that Khánh's group will be essentially pro-American, anti-communist and anti-neutralist in general orientation." As far as Harkins was concerned, with US policy committed to maintaining leadership in the hands of senior military officers, there were no other apparent options; he told General Taylor, "One thing is for sure with this coup. We've gone through all the eligible general officers." For his part, Lodge chose not to warn the junta, to which the embassy had pledged their support, as to the imminent plot, despite being well aware of it. He said in a cable a few days after the coup that "General Khánh's coup was extremely disconcerting at first blush", but that the lack of public reaction to the overthrow of Minh indicated that Khánh's actions were not something to be alarmed about. He wrote that the progress of history was often made in many phases by different individuals or groups, using the analogy that in an American political party, the people who manage the primary campaigns are different from those who run the national elections, while the officer-holders are entirely separate. Lodge speculated that while Minh and his generals were successful in removing Diệm—something Lodge strongly encouraged—they may not be the ideal administrators of a nation themselves. With respect to the prospects of defeating the communists, he said "Our side knows how to do it; we have the means with which to do it; we simply need to do it. This requires a tough and ruthless commander. Perhaps Khánh is it." Blair said that Lodge's habit of looking for American parallels to Vietnamese situations hindered his judgment, pointing out that Khánh's rule merely saw more instability and chaos. At the end of February, Lodge was still positive and cabled Washington to say that "I continue to be favorably impressed by him. He is really very much more able than the Minh, Don, Kim group and, of course, he is so far above Diệm and Nhu that there is no comparison."

The State Department appeared to not be well-informed about the action, as Ball cabled Lodge a few hours after the coup started: "We have so little info on motivations and other factors involved in current crisis that we leave to your judgment how to handle. Meantime we trust you will make very clear that we had nothing to do with coup. If you consider it advisable and possible there would seem to us to be merit in preserving Minh as head of Government since he appears to have best potentialities for rallying support of people." The Pentagon had opposed the removal of Diệm and opposed his successors, while the State Department supported such a move, and Khánh later reflected: "Maybe in the coup of January 30, 1964, the U.S. Army had come to conclude that it too should have the capacity to bring about a coup."

The Johnson administration turned out to be very happy with the change in power as it viewed Khánh as being more amenable to its policy. Upon instructions from the US Embassy, Saigon's Foreign Ministry drafted a text for a media conference where the coup was described merely as a "change in the Chairmanship and composition of the Military Revolutionary Council". Washington promptly promised support for the new regime even before Khánh had formed a government. At the same time, despite the fact that many senior members of Minh's junta were in custody, the Americans said that no change in power had occurred and that a fresh diplomatic recognition was not needed. Lodge claimed that Khánh's actions were merely a leadership change at the top of the MRC.

Having told his colleagues the same at the coup headquarters, Khánh told Lodge at the embassy that he would be relying upon him for political advice. On January 31, he explicitly requested the ambassador's judgment for what type of government he should form and for suggestions for leadership roles. Rusk suggested that Khánh should occupy the head of state as well as the chairmanship of the MRC, and on February 2, Johnson sent him a personal and supportive handwritten note, having been reported to be uneasy at first. However, Johnson also sent McNamara to Saigon to warn the officers that continued power struggles could make the US Congress hostile to further requests for funding. According to Blair, Johnson had no "inside knowledge of its preparation and mechanics". She concluded that Johnson had nothing to do with the coup and had no foreknowledge of it.

According to Blair, "Khánh could play Lodge like a musical instrument" in justifying his coup. The day after coming to power, Khánh further claimed to Lodge that Đôn was in possession of briefing papers from the Americans on plans for the bombing of North Vietnam and said that they were in danger of being handed over to the communists. Khánh further claimed to be desperately trying to retrieving the documents to prevent the communists from accessing the material. Blair cited Lodge's immediate response—he took Khánh seriously and sent an urgent cable to Washington through the top-secret CIA channel—as an example of gullibility with respect to Khánh's tendency to make grandiose and self-serving claims. Lodge was also greatly reassured by Khánh's assurances to support US bombing of North Vietnam, increased actions against the Viet Cong and an increase in US advisers down to village level. Lodge also told Khánh that military progress was the bottom line as far as continued US support for his leadership was concerned. According to Blair, "For Lodge, when something was done, it was done, and he cleared his mind of all but the cover-story". She said that Lodge was not interested in getting detailed information on the coup, only that "the best information was that the coup was planned and carried out by General Thieu".

== Khánh's consolidation of power ==
Khánh swiftly attempted to cement his grip on power by announcing himself as the new head of state and as Chairman of the Military Revolutionary Council in place of Minh. Khánh had tried to convince Minh to stay on as a powerless head of state, and a standoff developed on the day of the coup before Khánh concluded that Minh would refuse to serve. Minh was taken to military headquarters, and after refusing for several hours to cooperate, was taken under armed guard to his home for lunch. He continued to defy Khánh throughout the afternoon, calling for his fellow generals to be released. Minh had not been implicated in the alleged French neutralist plot and he remained silent throughout the day. A week later, Khánh managed to persuade Minh to remain as a figurehead head of state. This was partly due to American pressure, reasoning that the popular Minh would be a unifying and stabilizing factor in the new regime and that his cooperation would provide continuity. According to Kahin, it was "a means of symbolizing to the outside world a political unity and continuity that actually did not exist". Khánh characterized Minh's real lack of power to the Americans in private as being "exactly like the King of England", but on a "provisional basis". Khánh would have preferred to see Minh completely away from any public position along with his colleagues in Da Lat.

For his part, Minh resented that he had been deposed by a younger officer whom he viewed as an unscrupulous upstart. Minh was also upset with the detention of his fellow generals and around 30 of his junior officers. The latter group was set free when Minh made this a condition for his serving as the figurehead chief of state. Khánh attempted to avoid the issue of substantiating the alleged neutralist plot for as long as he could, and then tried to revive it by claiming that French agents were attempting to assassinate him and to enforce neutralism. Khánh offered no evidence, only claiming that the French had paid a hitman US$1300 to kill him, before later inflating the supposed reward for his assassination. American intelligence officials in Vietnam privately said that they were not aware of any such threat.

Khánh tried to ease hostile sentiment among the enlisted men in the South Vietnamese military towards the deposal of the popular Minh by raising the wages of privates and corporals by 20%, with the approval and funding of the US. He also tried to increase his support base among the senior officers several young colonels to the rank of "aspirant brigadier general". Recipients of the promotions were the commander of the Republic of Vietnam Navy Chung Tấn Cang, Republic of Vietnam Air Force commander Nguyễn Cao Kỳ, Airborne Brigade commander Cao Văn Viên, who was captured and almost executed by the deposed generals for refusing to turn against Diệm during the November 1963 coup, and Thi. Tôn Thất Xứng was promoted to brigadier general and made the commander of the Regional Forces.

=== Appointment of cabinet ===
Khánh soon came to dominate the MRC. He turned out to be far more politically astute and motivated than the previous junta, seeking out veteran Vietnamese politicians and technocrats to create a new government. A week after taking power, Khánh summoned Dr. Nguyễn Tôn Hoà, a Catholic who was one of the former leaders of the southern branch of the Đại Việt Quốc dân đảng (Nationalist Party of Greater Vietnam). Hoan had been exiled in Paris during the Diệm era, but remained active, publishing a magazine and keeping up to speed with developments in Vietnam. Hoan had generated little popular following during his campaign for power in the 1940s and 1950s and was unable to form a government as prime minister when he returned. Khánh thereupon decided to act as both Prime Minister and Chairman of the reorganized MRC, which he expanded to include 17 generals and 32 further officers for a total of 50 members. Hoan was appointed as the first Deputy Prime Minister in charge of rural pacification. He was given control of five ministries including the Interior, National Defense and Rural Affairs and two special commissions, which were primarily engaged in consolidating the strategic hamlets of Ngô Đình Nhu into the renamed New Rural Life Hamlets. The second Deputy Prime Minister was Harvard University-trained banker and economist Nguyễn Xuân Oánh, who was associated to the Đại Việt. Oanh was charged with managing the finance and economy of the country. Mậu was the Third Deputy Prime Minister, overseeing social and cultural affairs. Other Đại Việt politicians given cabinet posts included Phan Huy Quát as foreign minister and Ha Thuc Ky as interior minister. However, the second most powerful member of the new regime was Khiêm, who was defense minister, and Khánh firmly controlled the civilian government through the junta, which he rearranged to give greater weight to his fellow coup-plotters.

Khánh selected a cabinet of thirteen ministers and two Secretaries of State at ministerial level, and chose new provincial and district chiefs. He originally tried to include members of a variety of political and religious groups including representatives of the Cao Đài and Hòa Hảo sects, who still had remnants of their private armies intact after their defeat by Diệm in 1955. Although Khánh insisted that he had no party affiliation, the orientation of his government was toward the Đại Việt, who held many of the key posts in the government. This provoked bitterness from other anti-communist nationalists and groups that were banned under Diệm and were seeking a greater role in public life, as well as from a younger generation who felt that the established nationalist parties were responsible for dividing the people.

Khánh promised that the village elections abolished under Diệm would be held as soon as feasible and that a new National Assembly would be elected within a year. He started by abolishing the Council of Notables. Many Vietnamese and American observers considered this rash and premature, as promises of elections been frequently broken and that the council had at least been an effective forum for dissent, giving the semblance of democracy in the absence of parliamentary representation.

== Trial ==
Khánh presided over the trial, which took place on May 28 after prodding by the Americans for him to give his opponents a hearing. Minh was accused of misusing a small amount of money, before being allowed to serve as an advisor on the trial panel.

The generals were secretly interrogated for five and a half hours, mostly about details of their coup against Diệm, rather than the original charge of promoting neutralism. As all of the officers were involved in the plot against Diệm, this did not reveal any information new to them. The court deliberated for over nine hours, and when it reconvened for the verdict on May 29, Khánh stated, "We ask that once you begin to serve again in the army, you do not take revenge on anybody". The tribunal then "congratulated" the generals, but found that they were of "lax morality" and unqualified to command due to a "lack of a clear political concept". They were chastised for being "inadequately aware of their heavy responsibility" and of letting "their subordinates take advantage of their positions". Khánh also assailed Đính, claiming that he had derogatorily compared Khánh to Gamal Abdel Nasser in a meeting with Diệm. The four imprisoned generals were allowed to remain in Da Lat under surveillance with their families. However, there were reports that the trial ended in a festive manner akin to a party, as the officers shook hands and made up with one another, with Minh reported to have commended Khanh for his "fairness" before organising a celebratory dinner for the generals. All four generals were barred from commanding troops for a period; Kim was banned for six years, and Đôn 18 months. Offices were prepared for the quartet so that they could participate in "research and planning". Worried that the group of idle officers would plot against him, Khánh made some preliminary arrangements to send them to the United States for military study, but this fell through.

The trial was held behind closed doors and the public was not informed of the results nor that legal proceedings had occurred until a few days later. Despite the outcome, when the matter was made public, it was accompanied with a warning from Khánh against neutralism. The public press release stated that Khánh's junta had taken a lenient approach to enhance "the spirit of unity and the traditional comradeship in arms of the armed forces." Some civilians in Khánh's cabinet were caught off-guard by the secret hearing and one spoke out, saying "Letting them go like this removes the apparent justification for the whole Government's existence". The junta statement did not specifically charge anyone of neutralism but said that repetition of such activities could result in discharges from the military, implying that neutralist moves had occurred in the past. It warned of "infliction of all the punishments reserved for military personnel who have committed the crime of treason against the people in the struggled against the Communists and neutralists."

Khánh's actions left divisions among the officers of the ARVN who became dissatisfied with him. When Khánh was himself deposed in 1965, he handed over dossiers proving that the four generals were innocent; the original documents that Khánh claimed proved his accusations of neutralism were neither presented to nor found by anyone. Robert Shaplen said that "the case...continued to be one of Khánh's biggest embarrassments". Nevertheless, despite what the South Vietnamese public may have thought of him, Khánh enjoyed continuing confidence among the Americans until the latter part of 1964.
