= Nguyễn Ngọc Thơ =

Vice president of South Vietnam from 1956 to 1963

Nguyễn Ngọc Thơ 阮玉書
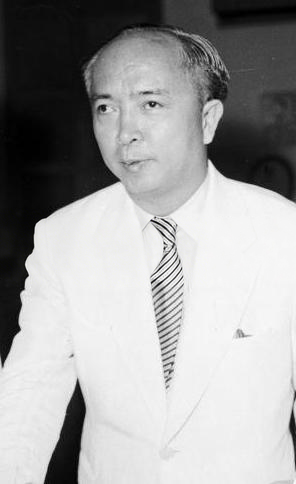
- Thơ in 1958

2nd Prime Minister of South Vietnam
- In office 4 November 1963 – 30 January 1964
- Deputy: None
- Chairman of the Military Revolutionary Council: Dương Văn Minh
- Preceded by: Ngô Đình Diệm (1954–1955)
- Succeeded by: Nguyễn Khánh

Governor of the National Bank of Vietnam
- In office 4 November 1963 – 30 January 1964
- Prime Minister: Himself
- Preceded by: Nguyễn Lữ Ông
- Succeeded by: Nguyễn Xuân Oánh

1st Vice President of South Vietnam
- In office 18 December 1956 – 2 November 1963
- President: Ngô Đình Diệm
- Preceded by: Position established
- Succeeded by: Nguyễn Cao Kỳ (1967)

South Vietnamese Ambassador to Japan
- In office 1955–1956
- President: Ngô Đình Diệm
- Preceded by: Đinh Văn Kiểu (as Chargé d'affaires)
- Succeeded by: Bùi Văn Thinh

Personal details
- Born: 26 May 1908 Long Xuyên, Cochinchina, French Indochina
- Died: 12 June 1976 (aged 68) Saigon – Gia Dinh, South Vietnam
- Party: Independent
- Parent: Nguyễn Ngọc Chơn (father)
- Education: Collège Chasseloup-Laubat

Nguyễn Ngọc Thơ (Vietnamese: [ŋwiən˦ˀ˥ ŋawk͡p̚˧˨ʔ tʰəː˧˧]; chữ Hán: 阮玉書 26 May 1908 – 12 June 1976) was a South Vietnamese politician who was the first vice president of South Vietnam, serving under President Ngô Đình Diệm from 1956 until Diệm's overthrow and assassination in 1963. He also served as the first prime minister of South Vietnam, serving from November 1963 to late January 1964. Thơ was appointed to head a civilian cabinet by the military junta of General Dương Văn Minh, which came to power after overthrowing and assassinating Diệm, the nation's first president. Thơ's rule was marked by a period of confusion and weak government, as the Military Revolutionary Council (MRC) and the civilian cabinet vied for power. Thơ lost his job and retired from politics when Minh's junta was deposed in a January 1964 coup by General Nguyễn Khánh.

The son of a wealthy Mekong Delta landowner, Thơ rose through the ranks as a low-profile provincial chief under French colonial rule, and he was briefly imprisoned by Imperial Japan when they invaded and deposed the French during World War II. During this time he met Minh for the first time as they shared a cell. Following World War II, he became the interior minister in the French-backed State of Vietnam, an associated state in the French Union. After the establishment of the Republic of Vietnam in 1955 following the partition in 1954, Thơ was sent to Japan as ambassador and secured war reparations. Recalled to Vietnam within a year, he helped to dismantle the private armies of the Hòa Hảo religious sect in the mid-1950s. Thơ led the political efforts to weaken the Hòa Hảo leadership. While Minh led the military effort, Thơ tried to buy off Hòa Hảo leaders. One commander, Ba Cụt, was personally hostile to Thơ, whose father had confiscated the land of Ba Cụt's family decades earlier. The stand-off could not be ended peacefully in this case, and Ba Cụt was captured and executed.

This success earned Thơ the vice presidential slot in December 1956 to widen the popular appeal of Diệm's nepotistic and sectarian regime. It was reasoned that Thơ's southern heritage would broaden the regime's political appeal—Diệm's family was from central Vietnam and most administrators were not from South Vietnam. Thơ was not allowed to take part in policy decisions and had little meaningful power, as Diệm's brothers, Nhu and Cẩn, commanded their own private armies and secret police, and ruled arbitrarily. Thơ oversaw South Vietnam's failed land reform policy, and was accused of lacking vigour in implementing the program as he was himself a large landowner. He was noted for his faithful support of Diệm during the Buddhist crisis that ended the rule of the Ngô family. Despite nominally being a Buddhist, Thơ defended the regime's pro–Roman Catholic policies and its violent actions against the Buddhist majority.

Thơ turned against Diệm and played a passive role in the coup. Upon the formation of the new government, he struggled to keep the nation under control as the MRC and civilian cabinet often gave contradictory orders. Media freedom and political debate were increased, but this backfired as Saigon became engulfed in infighting, and Thơ had a series of newspapers shut down after they used the new-found freedom to attack him. During that time, South Vietnam's military situation deteriorated as the consequences of Diệm's falsification of military statistics and the misguided policies that resulted were exposed. Minh and Thơ had a plan to try to end the war by winning over non-communist members of the insurgency, believing that they constituted the majority of the opposition and could be coaxed away, weakening the communists. As part of this policy, which the US opposed, the government chose to take a low-key military approach in an attempt to portray themselves to the Vietnamese public as peacemakers. However, they were deposed in Khánh's US-backed coup before they could pursue their strategy.

== Early career ==
The son of a wealthy southern landowner, Thơ was born in the province of Long Xuyên in the Mekong Delta. He began his bureaucratic career in 1930, serving the French colonial authorities as a low-profile provincial chief. During World War II, the Japanese invaded Vietnam but left a Vichy regime in place. Thơ rose to become the first secretary of the Resident Superior of Annam, the French governor of the central region of Vietnam. During this time, he crossed paths with Ngô Đình Diệm, a former interior minister under the French regime in the 1930s. The French thought that Diệm was working with Imperial Japan and tried to have him arrested, but Thơ tipped off Diệm and the Kempeitai, resulting in their escape.

In March 1945, Japan, which had invaded and occupied French Indochina in 1941 during World War II, decided to take direct control and overthrew the French colonial regime. Thơ was thrown into a crowded cell with several other prisoners that had no light or toilet and filled with their own excrement. One of his cellmates was Dương Văn Minh, then a junior officer in the French military forces with whom he would work over the next two decades. Thơ was released first and lobbied to have Minh released as well and the pair remained close friends.

Following World War II, Thơ became interior minister in the French-backed State of Vietnam under former Emperor Bảo Đại. Following the withdrawal of France from Indochina after the Battle of Điện Biên Phủ, Vietnam was partitioned into a communist north and anti-communist south. Following the proclamation of the Republic of Vietnam—commonly known as South Vietnam—by President Ngô Đình Diệm, who had dethroned Bảo Đại in a fraudulent referendum, Thơ was appointed the inaugural ambassador to Japan. Despite spending most of his time in Tokyo confined to his bed by a fractured hip, Thơ secured reparations from Japan for its imperial occupation of Vietnam during World War II.

In 1956, Diệm recalled him to Saigon to help deal with the Hòa Hảo, a religious sect equipped with a private army. The Hòa Hảo was effectively an autonomous entity in the Mekong Delta, as its private army enforced a parallel administration and refused to integrate into the Saigon administration. While the Army of the Republic of Vietnam (ARVN) General Dương Văn Minh led the military effort against the Hòa Hảo, Thơ helped to weaken the sect by buying off its warlords.

However, one Hòa Hảo commander, Ba Cụt, continued to fight, having had a personal history of bad blood with Thơ's own family. The orphaned, illiterate Cụt's adopted father's rice paddies were confiscated by Thơ's father, which purportedly imbued Cụt with a permanent hatred towards the landowning class. Cụt was eventually surrounded and sought to make a peace deal so he sent a message to Thơ asking for negotiations so that his men could be integrated into mainstream society and the nation's armed forces. Thơ agreed to meet Ba Cụt alone in the jungle, and despite fears the meeting was a Hòa Hảo trap, he was not ambushed. However, Cụt began asking for additional concessions and the meeting ended in a stalemate. Cụt was captured on 13 April 1956 and guillotined after a brief trial and his remaining forces were defeated in battle.

During this period, Thơ was the Secretary of State for the National Economy. In November, Diệm appointed Thơ as vice president in an effort to widen the regime's popular appeal. The appointment was endorsed by the National Assembly in December 1956, in accordance with the constitution. The move was widely seen as an attempt to use Thơ's Mekong Delta roots to increase the government's popular appeal among southern peasants, because Diệm's regime was dominated by family members, Catholics from central Vietnam.

== Diệm era ==
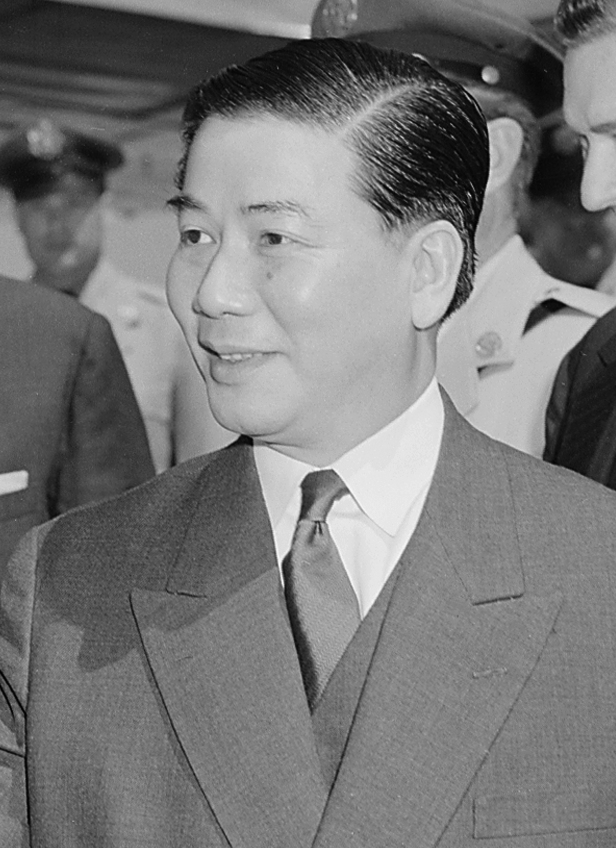
Ngô Đình Diệm (pictured), the President of South Vietnam.

Despite the importance of his title, Thơ rarely appeared with Diệm in public and was a figurehead with little influence. The real power lay with Diệm's younger brothers, Nhu and Cẩn, who commanded private armies and secret police, as well as giving orders directly to ARVN generals. Nhu reportedly once ordered a bodyguard to slap Thơ because he felt Thơ had shown him a lack of respect. Diệm held Thơ in contempt and did not allow him to take part in major policy decisions, despite theoretically being the second most powerful man in the country. Thơ had a rapport with the military officers, having befriended Minh years earlier. He was regarded as a genial and affable administrator with a reputation for making compromises.

Thơ was charged with overseeing South Vietnam's land reform program, because the minister of agrarian reform, Nguyễn Văn Thời, answered to him. As both men were wealthy landowners, they had little incentive for the program to succeed. The US embassy received angry criticism of Thoi's lack of enthusiasm towards implementing the policy, stating, "he is most certainly not interested in land distribution which would divest him of much of his property".

Thơ also retained a degree of influence over domestic economic policies, which ran far behind Diệm's priorities of absolute control over the military and other apparatus through which he maintained his rule. Despite never having been trained in economic matters, Thơ had a prominent hand in the administration of the Commodity Import Program, an American initiative akin to the Marshall Plan, whereby aid was funnelled into the economy through importing licenses rather than money, in order to avoid inflation. However, Thơ's administration of the program led to the vast majority of the imports being consumer goods for the upper classes, rather than capital goods to develop South Vietnam's economic capacity. Under Thơ's watch, the foreign trade deficit hovered between 150 and 200%, and the gap between the urban elite and the peasant majority grew. American advisers thought Thơ and the Ngô brothers continually went against their counsel because they were either incompetent or simply distrustful and thus did the opposite of what was recommended.

Thơ also clashed with Interior Minister Nguyễn Hữu Châu over economic strategy. Châu was married to Madame Nhu's sister and appointed due to nepotism, but was later expelled from the Ngô family due to his dissent. The Americans claimed Thơ, who was trained in public security, "knew more about political control than the 'basic laws of the market place'". In mid-1961, after a visit by US Vice President Lyndon B. Johnson and pressure from leading American officials, Diệm relieved Thơ of his economic duties.

Thơ then began to put try to put pressure on the Americans to influence Diệm. During a fact-finding mission by General Maxwell Taylor, the chief of the US military, and Walt Rostow, Thơ and Minh complained of Diệm's autocratic ways and religious favoritism towards his fellow Catholics to the disadvantage of the majority Buddhist populace. In 1962, he told senior US Embassy official Joseph Mendenhall that Diệm's military subordinates invented arbitrary and falsely inflated figures of Viet Cong fighters.

== Role in Buddhist crisis ==
Despite being a Buddhist, Thơ had a reputation for heaping praise on Diệm's Roman Catholic government. On Diệm's 62nd birthday, Thơ paid tribute, saying, "thanks to the Almighty for having given the country a leader whose genius was outweighed only by his virtue". (Buddhism is a Dharmic religion which does not recognise a supreme being in a theistic sense.) Thơ later accompanied Diệm to the Roman Catholic Redemptorist Church to pray for the President. Thơ had little public following, with American Chairman of the Joint Chiefs of Staff General Maxwell Taylor calling him "unimpressive", while prominent State Department official Paul Kattenberg derided Thơ as a "nonentity".

In another project, the village of La Vang in Quảng Trị Province near the border with North Vietnam, was the scene of a female apparition in the late 19th century. Buddhists claimed that the bodhisattva Avalokiteshvara (also known as Kuanyin; Vietnamese: Quan Âm) performed the miracle. Diệm's brother, Ngô Đình Thục, was the Roman Catholic Archbishop of Huế and the foremost religious figure in South Vietnam's nepotistic regime. Thục declared that the apparition was the Virgin Mary, and ordered that a cathedral be built in place of the makeshift Buddhist pagoda that occupied the site. Thơ made notable financial donations to the project for political reasons.

In June, as the Buddhist crisis escalated, Diệm appointed Thơ to lead a government committee to deal with grievances raised by the Buddhist community following the Huế Vesak shootings in which eight Buddhists were killed by government forces while protesting a ban on the flying of Buddhist flags. The committee concluded the Việt Cộng was responsible for the deaths, despite eyewitness accounts and amateur video showing that the government had fired directly at protesters. The committee's whitewash caused Buddhist protests to escalate. When de facto First Lady Madame Nhu (herself a Buddhist convert to Catholicism) mockingly described the self-immolation of Buddhist monk Thích Quảng Đức as a "barbecue", Thơ refused to condemn her remarks, saying they were "personal opinions".

Thơ was part of an Interministerial Committee, a group of government officials that negotiated a Joint Communique with the Buddhists to end the civil disobedience. An agreement was signed, but never implemented. Thơ was later criticised by the Nhus through their English language mouthpiece, the Times of Vietnam, for the deal. Despite the general amnesty granted to arrested Buddhist activists, on 13 August, Thơ gave a press conference during which he vowed to prosecute the Buddhist victims of the Huế Vesak shootings, and revoking the amnesty and vowing to jail Buddhist demonstrators.

At a farewell dinner for US ambassador Frederick Nolting in July, Thơ called for the Buddhists to be "crushed without pity". He derisively said that Buddhism was not a religion and further claimed that while anybody could become a Buddhist monk, it took years of training to become a Catholic priest. When the Thai ambassador disagreed, citing his own previous monastic training, Thơ taunted him in front of other diplomats.

With the pressure on the Diệm regime increasing during the Buddhist crisis, Nhu and Diệm began to shun their cabinet members because they presented arguments contrary to the thinking of the Ngô family. Many ministers attempted to resign, but Thơ was credited with persuading them to stay in office. Finding the situation increasingly intolerable, Thơ also considered resigning but the dissident generals urged him to remain. They were worried that mass resignations would arouse suspicion of a coup plot.

== Prime minister ==
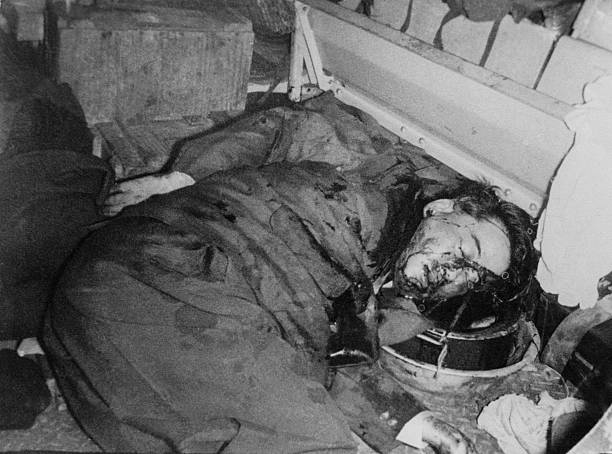
The corpse of Diệm after his assassination on 2 November 1963

In private, Thơ expressed his displeasure with Diệm's rule to US officials. He complained of Diệm's reliance on Nhu in the running of the country, Nhu's attempt to run a police state through his secret Cần Lao apparatus and the lack of success against the Việt Cộng. During the McNamara Taylor mission to South Vietnam, Thơ confided his belief that the country was heading in the wrong direction to the American delegation, imploring them to pressure Diệm to reform his policies. He privately revealed his belief that of the thousands of fortified settlements built under Nhu's Strategic Hamlet Program, fewer than thirty were functional. Years after, Tho stated that neither Diem and Nhu, nor the American political figures that made policy on Vietnam, understood one another.

Joseph Mendenhall, a senior Vietnam adviser in the US State Department, advocated the removal of Diệm in a military coup and his replacement with Thơ. Thơ was privately aware that he was the choice of the generals to run the government after the planned overthrow of Diệm. By this time, Diệm and Nhu realized a plot was afoot against them, but did not know that General Tôn Thất Đính, a palace favourite was involved. Nhu ordered Đính and Colonel Lê Quang Tung, the ARVN Special Forces commander, to plan a fake coup against the Ngô family.

One of Nhu's objectives was to trick dissidents into joining the false uprising so that they could be identified and eliminated. Another objective of the public relations stunt was to give a false impression of the strength of the regime. The first stage of the scheme would involve loyalist soldiers, disguised as insurgents, faking a coup and vandalising the capital. A "revolutionary government" consisting of opposition activists who had not consented to being named in the regime would be announced, while Diệm and Nhu would pretend to be on the run. During the orchestrated chaos of the first coup, the loyalists and Nhu's underworld contacts would kill the leading plotting generals and their assistants, such as Thơ, CIA officer Lucien Conein, and US Ambassador Henry Cabot Lodge Jr. A fake "counter-coup" was to follow, whereupon the loyalists would triumphantly re-enter Saigon to restore the Diệm regime. However, the plot failed because Đính was part of the coup plot and sent the loyalist forces out of the capital to open the door for the rebels.

After the coup on 1 November 1963, in which Diệm and Nhu were killed the following day, Thơ was appointed prime minister by Minh's military junta five days later, on 6 November 1963. He was the leading civilian in the provisional government overseen by the Military Revolutionary Council (MRC). Minh had earlier promised US officials that the civilians would be above the generals in the hierarchy. In addition, he was minister for finance and the economy. Thơ's appointment was not universally popular, with some leading figures privately lobbying for a clean break from the Diệm era.

=== Relationship with junta ===
Thơ's civilian government was plagued by infighting. According to Thơ's assistant, Nguyễn Ngọc Huy, the presence of Generals Trần Văn Đôn and Tôn Thất Đính in both the civilian cabinet and the MRC paralysed the governance process. Đính and Đôn were subordinate to Thơ in the civilian government, but as members of the MRC they were superior to him. Whenever Thơ gave an order in the civilian hierarchy with which the generals disagreed, they would go to the MRC and countermand it.

Saigon newspapers, which had re-opened following the end of Diệm's censorship, reported that the junta was paralysed because all twelve generals in the MRC had equal power. Each member of the MRC had the power of veto, enabling them to stonewall policy decisions. The press, which was liberalised following the downfall of Diệm, strongly attacked Thơ, accusing his government of being "tools" of the MRC. Thơ's record under Diệm's presidency was called into question, with allegations circulating in the media that he had supported the repression of the Buddhists by Diệm and Nhu. Thơ claimed that he had countenanced Nhu's brutal Xá Lợi Pagoda raid, attempting to prove that he would have resigned were it not for Minh's pleas to stay. The media further derided Thơ for the personal benefits that he gained from the Diệm administration's land policy. Minh defended Thơ's anti-Diệm credentials by declaring that Thơ had taken part in the planning of the coup "from the very outset" and that he enjoyed the "full confidence" of the junta.

At one point in December, Thơ could no longer withstand what the free media were publishing about him and called around 100 journalists into his office. An angry Thơ shouted at the writers and banged his fist on the table, assailing them for what he regarded as inaccurate, irresponsible and disloyal reporting. Thơ claimed the media were lying in saying that he and his civilian cabinet were puppets of the generals, and claimed that one of the journalists was a communist while another was a drug addict. He said that his administration would "take steps to meet the situation" if the media did not behave responsibly. Having already had his Information Minister, General Đỗ Mậu, circulate a list of topics that were not to be reported on, Thơ had Mậu close down three newspapers for "disloyalty" on the following day.

On 1 January 1964, a Council of Notables, comprising sixty leading citizens, met for the first time, having been selected by Colonel Phạm Ngọc Thảo. Its job was to advise the military and civilian wings of the government with a view towards reforming human rights, the constitution and the legal system. Thơ publicly stated that he expected a "rational attitude" coupled with "impartial and realistic judgments" and said that it was part of the provisional government's quest to "clear the way for a permanent regime, which our people are longing for". The council consisted almost entirely of professionals and academic leaders, with no representatives from the agricultural or labour movements. It soon became engaged in endless debate and never achieved its initial task of drafting a new constitution. Thơ later admitted that the council was unrepresentative of South Vietnamese society and had been a failure. He claimed that the council's desire to move away from the rubber stamp model of Diệm's National Assembly had caused it to degenerate into a debating society.

=== Policies ===
With the fall of Diệm, various American sanctions that were implemented against South Vietnam in response to the repression of the Buddhist crisis and Nhu's Special Forces' Xá Lợi Pagoda raids, were lifted. The freeze on US economic aid, the suspension of the Commercial Import Program and various capital works initiatives were lifted. The United States quickly moved to recognise Thơ and Minh.

Thơ's government halted Nhu's Strategic Hamlet Program. Nhu had trumpeted the program as the solution to South Vietnam's difficulties with Việt Cộng insurgents, believing that the mass relocation of peasants into fortified villages would isolate the Viet Cong from their peasant support base. Thơ contradicted Nhu's earlier reports on the success of the program, claiming that only 20% of the 8,600 existing strategic hamlets were under Saigon's control, with the rest having been taken over by the communists. Those hamlets that were deemed to be tenable were consolidated, while the remainder were dismantled and their inhabitants returned to their ancestral land.

Thơ's approach to removing Diệm supporters from positions of influence drew criticism from both supporters and opponents of the deposed president. Some felt he was not vigorous enough in removing pro-Diệm elements from authority, whereas others felt that the magnitude of the turnover of public servants was excessive and bordering on vengeance. A number of officials suspected of having engaged in corruption or Diệmist oppression were indiscriminately arrested without charge, most of whom were later released. Đính and the new national police chief, General Mai Hữu Xuân, were given control of the interior ministry. The pair were accused of arresting people en masse, before releasing them in return for bribes and pledges of loyalty. Not all officials under Diệm could automatically be considered pro-Diệm, yet there were calls for further removals of the old guard. The government was criticised for firing large numbers of district and provincial chiefs directly appointed by Diệm, causing a breakdown in law and order during the abrupt transition of power. One high profile and heavily criticised non-removal was that of General Đỗ Cao Trí, the commander of the ARVN I Corps who gained prominence for his particularly stringent anti-Buddhist crackdown in the central region around Huế. Trí was simply transferred to the II Corps in the Central Highlands directly south of the I Corps region.

Thơ and the leading generals in the MRC also had a secret plan to end the communist insurgency, which called itself the National Liberation Front (NLF) and claimed to be independent of the communist government of North Vietnam. They claimed that most of them were first and foremost southern nationalists opposed to foreign military intervention and US involvement and support of Diệm. The MRC and Thơ thought that an agreement to end the war within South Vietnam was possible. Thơ recalled in later years that his government's plan was to generate support among the Cao Đài, Hòa Hảo and ethnic Cambodian minorities, elements of which were in the NLF and bring them back into the mainstream fold out of the insurgency into a non-communist pro-West political system. He thought that it was possible to sideline the communists as he described them as "still having no dominance and only a minor position" within the NLF. According to Thơ, this plan was not a deal with the communists or the NLF as his group saw it as a political attempt to coax back non-communist dissidents and isolate those that were communists.

The government rebuffed American proposals to bomb North Vietnam on the grounds that such actions would cede the moral high ground, which they claimed on the basis of fighting purely for self-defense. For their part, Minh and Thơ's leadership group believed that a more low-key military approach was needed for their political campaign against the insurgency. Minh and Thơ explicitly and bluntly turned down the bombing proposal in a 21 January meeting with US officials. Australian historian Anne E. Blair identified this exchange as sealing the regime's "death warrant".

She pointed out that when the discussion was reported to Washington, the leading US generals in the US military lobbied Defense Secretary Robert McNamara, claiming that it was no longer feasible to work within the parameters laid out by Saigon and that the US should simply take control of anti-communist military policy, thereby necessitating a coup. The Americans became increasingly concerned with Saigon's reluctance to intensify the war effort, and bombing rebuff was regarded as a critical point. The government's plans to win over the NLF were never implemented to any degree before the government was deposed.

=== Downfall ===
The provisional government lacked direction in policy and planning, resulting in its quick collapse. The number of rural attacks instigated by the Viet Cong surged in the wake of Diệm's deposal, due to the displacement of troops into urban areas for the coup. The increasingly free discussion generated from the surfacing of new and accurate data following the coup revealed that the military situation was far worse than what was reported by Diệm. The incidence of Việt Cộng attacks continued to increase as it had done during the summer of 1963, the weapons loss ratio worsened and the rate of Viet Cong defections fell. The units that participated in the coup were returned to the field to guard against a possible major communist offensive in the countryside. The falsification of military statistics by Diệm's officials had led to miscalculations, which manifested themselves in military setbacks after Diệm's death. Aside from battlefield setbacks, something that was outside his remit, Thơ was also becoming unpopular in the military establishment. One of the goals of the various anti-Minh coup plots at the time was to remove Thơ, and the prime minister's unpopularity helped to distract some of the incumbent officers from the fact that they were the primary target; at that time, the MRC was moving toward removing Thơ, and Minh was the only senior general to retain confidence in him.

On 29 January, General Nguyễn Khánh ousted Minh's MRC in a bloodless pre-dawn coup; although Khánh accused the junta of intending to make a deal with the communists and claimed to have proof, he was actually motivated by personal ambition. After Khánh was deposed a year later, he admitted that the allegations against Minh's group were false. In later years, Khánh, Thơ and Minh's generals all agreed that the coup was strongly encouraged by the Americans and could not have occurred without their backing.

Thơ was apprehended during the coup and put under house arrest while the plotters consolidated their grip on power; he was then removed from the political scene. The civilian arm of the government was replaced with Khánh appointees, and Thơ left politics, having personally enriched himself during his period in government. His activities after leaving politics are not known. He died in Saigon – Gia Dinh on 12 June 1976, at the age of 68.

== Notes ==
Political offices
Preceded by Position established	Vice President of the Republic of Vietnam; 1956–1963	Succeeded by Nguyễn Cao Kỳ (in 1967)
Preceded by Position established	Prime Minister of the Republic of Vietnam; 1963–1964	Succeeded by Nguyễn Khánh
Diplomatic posts
Preceded by Position established	Ambassador of South Vietnam to Japan; 1955–1956	Succeeded by Bùi Văn Thinh
