= Nguyễn Văn Nhung =

South Vietnamese army officer (1919/20–1964)

Major Nguyễn Văn Nhung
- Born: 1919 or 1920; French Indochina
- Died: 31 January 1964 (aged 44–45); Saigon, South Vietnam
- Military career
- Allegiance: South Vietnam
- Branch: French Army (1944–49); Vietnamese National Army (1949–55); Army of the Republic of Vietnam (1955–63)
- Rank: Major
- Conflicts: First Indochina War; 1963 South Vietnamese coup d'état Ngô Đình Diệm, Ngô Đình Nhu and Lê Quang Tung
- Other work: Aide-de-camp and bodyguard of General Dương Văn Minh, military hitman who assassinated or executed 50 people

Nguyễn Văn Nhung (1919 or 1920 – 31 January 1964) was an officer in the Army of the Republic of Vietnam (ARVN). After joining the French Army in 1944 during the colonial era of Vietnam, he soon met and became the aide-de-camp and bodyguard of Dương Văn Minh, and spent the rest of his career in this role as Minh rose up the ranks to become a general. Nhung and Minh later transferred to the French-backed Vietnamese National Army (VNA) during the First Indochina War and he became an officer; the VNA then became the ARVN after the creation of the Republic of Vietnam (South Vietnam). A soft-spoken man, Nhung was a professional military assassin best known for his role in the November 1963 coup d'état led by Minh that ousted President Ngô Đình Diệm from office.

At the end of the coup, Nhung - having shot Colonel Lê Quang Tung, the loyalist commander of the Army of the Republic of Vietnam Special Forces at a grave at Tân Sơn Nhứt Air Base the day before - executed President Diệm and his brother Ngô Đình Nhu. An investigation led by General Trần Văn Đôn, another coup plotter, determined that Nhung had repeatedly stabbed and shot the Ngô brothers while escorting them back to military headquarters after having arrested them. It was widely believed that Minh had ordered Nhung to execute the Ngô brothers. Following Nguyễn Khánh's successful January 1964 coup against Minh's military junta, Nhung died in mysterious circumstances, the only fatality in the otherwise bloodless regime change.

== Career ==
Nhung was born in either 1919 or early 1920. At the time, Vietnam was a French colony within French Indochina; and, in 1944, Nhung joined the French Army, where he soon met Dương Văn Minh, who became his superior for the next two decades. Nhung would spend most of his career as Minh's aide-de-camp and bodyguard. He was described as a quiet and slightly built man who smoked a pipe. Following the end of World War II, the French set up the State of Vietnam, an associated state within the French Union, and created the Vietnamese National Army (VNA), and both Minh and Nhung transferred to the VNA, where they were trained and commissioned as officers. By November 1963, Nhung had risen to the rank of captain. He was reputed to have etched a line on his revolver for each of his killings, and ended the lives of 50 people during his career.

== 1963 coup ==
=== Tung assassination ===
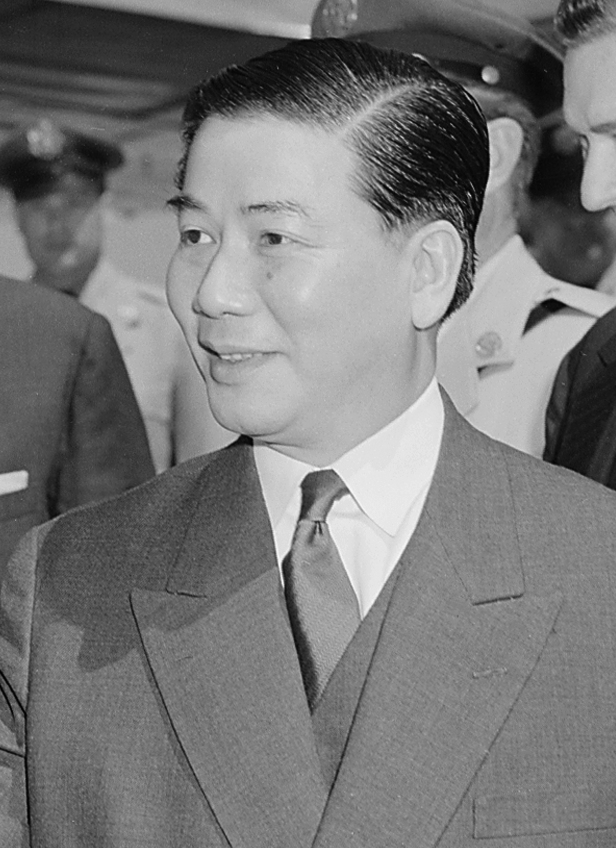
Ngô Đình Diệm, the President of South Vietnam.

On 1 November 1963, a group of ARVN generals, led by Minh, orchestrated a coup against President Ngô Đình Diệm. The plotters summoned a group of ARVN officers to the Joint General Staff headquarters at Tân Sơn Nhứt Air Base, on the pretext that they were going to attend a lunch meeting. Among those invited was the loyalist commander of the Army of the Republic of Vietnam Special Forces, Colonel Lê Quang Tung. At 13:30 (UTC 06:30), General Trần Văn Đôn announced that a coup was taking place. Most of the officers rose to applaud, but Tung did not, refusing to join the coup. He was taken away by Nhung, all the while shouting, "Remember who gave you your stars!"

At 16:45, Tung was forced at gunpoint to talk to Diệm on the phone, telling the president that he had ordered his special forces to surrender. Minh then ordered Nhung to execute the Diệm loyalist. Tung had failed to convince the president to surrender and still commanded the loyalty of his men. The other generals had little sympathy for Tung, because the special forces' commander had disguised his men in regular army uniforms and framed the generals for the Xá Lợi Pagoda raids in August. The generals were well aware of the threat that Tung posed; they had discussed his elimination during their planning, having contemplated waging an offensive against his special forces. At nightfall, Nhung took Tung, and his brother and deputy, Major Lê Quang Triệu, with their hands tied, to a jeep and drove them to the edge of the air base. Forced to kneel over two freshly dug holes, the brothers were shot into their graves and buried.

=== Diệm and Nhu assassination ===
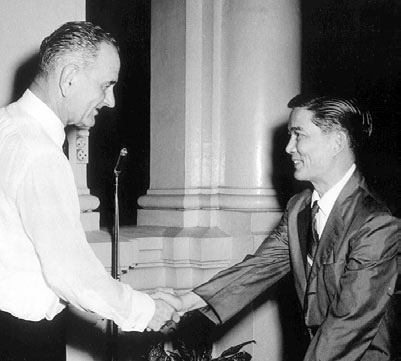
Ngô Đình Nhu (pictured) shaking hands with United States Vice President Lyndon B. Johnson.

By the next morning, the loyalist forces had collapsed. Diệm and his younger brother and chief adviser, Ngô Đình Nhu, agreed to surrender, and coup plotter Đôn promised them safe passage out of the country. In the meantime, Minh left Joint General Staff (JGS) headquarters and travelled to Gia Long Palace in a sedan, accompanied by Nhung. He arrived at the palace at 08:00 in full military uniform to supervise the arrest of Diệm and Nhu for the surrender ceremony.

However, the Ngô brothers were not there, they had escaped from Gia Long Palace via a secret tunnel to a safehouse in Cholon the previous night. Diệm and Nhu had communicated with the generals via a direct phone link from the safehouse to the palace, giving the false impression that they were still besieged. Having been informed of Diệm and Nhu’s whereabouts, Minh dispatched a group of officers and troops—which included Nhung—to arrest them. He was aware that the brothers had left the safehouse to go to St Francis Xavier's Church. Led by General Mai Hữu Xuân, the officers took an M113 armored personnel carrier (APC), four jeeps, and several soldiers to Cholon. As they left, Minh gestured to Nhung with two fingers, taken to be an order to shoot the brothers.

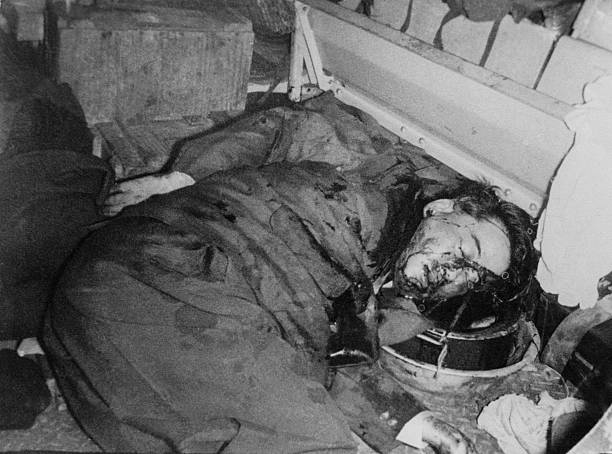
The corpse of Ngô Đình Diệm in the back of an armoured personnel carrier

The soldiers arrived at the church and promptly arrested the brothers, tying them with their hands behind their backs. After the arrest, Nhung and Major Dương Hiếu Nghĩa sat with Diệm and Nhu inside the APC, and the convoy departed for Tân Sơn Nhứt. They stopped at a railroad crossing on the return trip where, by all accounts, the brothers were assassinated. An investigation by Đôn later determined that Nghĩa had shot the brothers at point-blank range with a semi-automatic firearm and that Nhung sprayed them with bullets before repeatedly stabbing their bodies with a knife.

During the journey back, Nghĩa gave his account of the assassinations to military headquarters: "As we rode back to the Joint General Staff headquarters, Diệm sat silently, but Nhu and the captain [Nhung] began to insult each other. I don't know who started it. The name-calling grew passionate. The captain had hated Nhu before. Now he was charged with emotion." When the convoy reached a train crossing, Nghĩa said that Nhung "lunged at Nhu with a bayonet and stabbed him again and again, maybe fifteen or twenty times. Still in a rage, he turned to Diệm, took out his revolver and shot him in the head. Then he looked back at Nhu, who was lying on the floor, twitching. He put a bullet into his head too. Neither Diệm nor Nhu ever defended themselves. Their hands were tied." In a 1994 interview, General Nguyễn Khánh recalled, "Nhu (Diệm's brother) was alive when they put the knife in to take out some of the organs...the gallbladder. And in the Orient when you are a big soldier, big man - this thing is very important... They do it against Nhu when Nhu was alive... And Diệm had this happen to him, and later on they kill him by pistol and rifle."

Đôn and other officers were stunned when the corpses arrived at JGS headquarters. Đôn confronted Minh in his office, and while they were remonstrating, Xuân entered the room. Unaware of Đôn's presence, Xuân snapped to attention and stated in French, “Mission accomplie”. Despite Đôn's investigation, no one was ever charged with the killings.

== Death ==
Following the coup, Nhung's commanding officer, General Minh, became the President of South Vietnam, ruling through a military junta known as the Military Revolutionary Council. After three months of rule, which was criticised for its lack of direction, General Nguyễn Khánh deposed Minh in a bloodless coup before dawn on 30 January 1964. Minh was briefly put under house arrest, and the next day, reports surfaced that Nhung was confirmed to have died, the only fatality in the coup or its aftermath.

There was initially confusion as various conflicting reports of Nhung's demise surfaced, one source telling journalists that Nhung lived in a cottage within the grounds of Minh's villa and shot himself outside his house. These informants speculated that Nhung committed suicide to avoid having to live to see Minh being demoted or humiliated. The time of this incident was reported to be 21:00. Other reports at the time said that Nhung was found dead as a result of strangulation at the Joint General Staff headquarters. According to variations of this line, Nhung either hanged himself in custody or was murdered by an unknown hand.

More recently, historians have come to believe that Khánh ordered that Nhung be liquidated and that the earlier reports were deliberately false material disseminated by Khánh through his subordinates. According to this account, one of Khánh's men took Nhung to the garden of a Saigon villa and forced him to kneel, before executing him with a single gunshot to the back of the head. Nhung's death led to protests among the Saigon public, who took the killing to be a signal that the remaining members of Diệm's regime would be reinstated to positions of authority.

Nhung was buried on 1 February, the day after his death, in the presence of family and friends, at Gia Đính cemetery. Nhung's death was never formally investigated by an independent body and the official line of suicide continued to be propagated.

Minh was said to have been deeply affected by the loss of his long-time aide, and it was reported that the general erected an altar dedicated to Nhung's memory in his office, with the major's portrait on it. Shortly after the coup, Khánh made Minh the figurehead head of state under American advice, hoping that the presence of the popular general would help to unify the armed forces, but Minh made little attempt to help Khánh, partly because of resentment over the loss of his aide.
