= Tôn Thất Xứng =

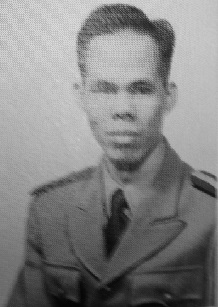
Tôn Thất Xứng

Major General Tôn Thất Xứng ([toŋ˧˧ tʰək̚˦˥ sɨŋ˦˥], tong tək sing; 1923–2018) was an officer of the Army of the Republic of Vietnam.

He served as the commander of I Corps, which oversaw the northernmost part of the country, from 30 January 1964 until 14 November of the same year, when he was replaced by Lieutenant General Nguyễn Chánh Thi. Xứng was installed on the day of the successful coup by General Nguyễn Khánh that toppled the military junta of General Dương Văn Minh.
