= Dương Hiếu Nghĩa =

South Vietnamese soldier

- Born: c. 1925; Sa Đéc, Vietnam
- Died: 14 April 2019 (aged 94); Richland, Washington, U.S.
- Military career
- Allegiance: South Vietnam
- Branch: Army of the Republic of Vietnam
- Rank: Colonel
- Conflicts: Vietnam War

Dương Hiếu Nghĩa (c. 1925 – 14 April 2019) was a Colonel in the South Vietnamese Army of the Republic of Vietnam (ARVN). He graduated from the Đà Lạt National Military Academy. During the Vietnam War, he served in various infantry and armored units. His highest administrative position was Province Chief of Vĩnh Long.

Dương, along with Captain Nguyễn Văn Nhung, executed President Ngô Đình Diệm and the President's confidant, his brother Ngô Đình Nhu after the latter were arrested at the end of an army coup. After the Fall of Saigon in 1975, Nghĩa spent at least a dozen years in various re-education camps.

== Execution of Diem ==
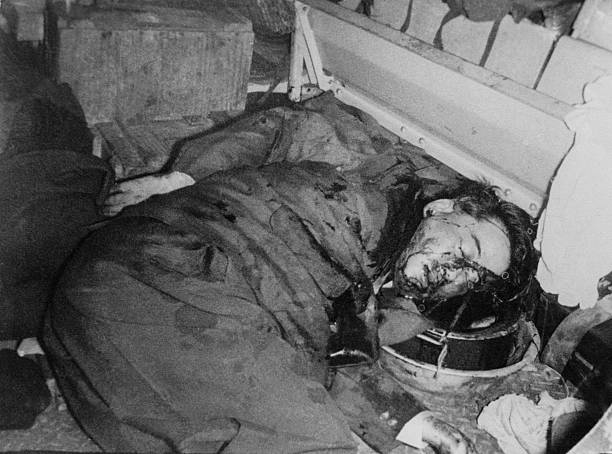
The corpse of Ngô Đình Diệm in the back of an armoured personnel carrier, 2 November 1963

Nghĩa was part of a group of military personnel sent to arrest Diem and Nhu at the conclusion of the successful coup. After arresting the brothers and tying them with their hands behind their backs, Nghĩa and Major Nguyen Van Nhung sat with Diệm and Nhu inside an M113 armored personnel carrier, and the convoy departed for Tân Sơn Nhứt Air Base. They stopped at a railroad crossing on the return trip where, by all accounts, the brothers were assassinated. An investigation by General Tran Van Don later determined that Nghĩa had shot the brothers at point-blank range with a semi-automatic firearm and that Nhung sprayed them with bullets before repeatedly stabbing their bodies with a knife.

Nghĩa gave his account of the assassinations to military headquarters: “As we rode back to the Joint General Staff headquarters, Diệm sat silently, but Nhu and the captain [Nhung] began to insult each other. I don’t know who started it. The name-calling grew passionate. The captain had hated Nhu before. Now he was charged with emotion.” When the convoy reached a train crossing, Nghĩa said that Nhung “lunged at Nhu with a bayonet and stabbed him again and again, maybe fifteen or twenty times. Still in a rage, he turned to Diệm, took out his revolver and shot him in the head. Then he looked back at Nhu, who was lying on the floor, twitching. He put a bullet into his head too. Neither Diệm nor Nhu ever defended themselves. Their hands were tied.”

== 1964 coup ==
Nghĩa was then involved in a January 1964 coup, just three months later, against the military junta led by General Duong Van Minh that had toppled Diem. The plotters, led by General Nguyen Khanh, needed help from Nghĩa, one of the leading Đại Việt officers and temporary head of the Capital Armored Command. A friend and appointee of Minh, Nghĩa caused difficulties by failing to respond to General Nguyen Van Thieu's order that all armor be moved north out of Saigon to Thiệu's 5th Division headquarters at Biên Hòa, a satellite city on the northeastern edge of the capital. A CIA cable reported that Nghĩa was aware that the movements were part of a coup against Minh and told Thieu that he would not deploy out of the capital and declared his support for Minh. This caught the plotters off guard, and as Harkins left on his "fieldtrip" at the same time, historian George McTurnan Kahin conjectured that he had actually gone to lobby Nghĩa to support the coup or at least partially back it by agreeing to help depose Minh's confidants Đôn, Ton That Dinh, Le Van Kim and Mai Huu Xuan. However, it was then reported that Nghĩa had agreed to support Thieu, who had apparently then gained the control of both the armored and Marine elements in Saigon.

When the coup began, Nghĩa showed his mixed feelings about the junta through the selective use of his armored troops. They supported Khánh's move against Đính, Đôn, Kim and Xuân, but tried to protect Minh by using tanks to shield Minh's house from Duong Ngoc Lam's Civil Guard units, which were also used to arrest the four other leading junta members.

== Death ==
Duong died in Richland, Washington on 14 April 2019, at the age of 94.

== See also ==
- Arrest and assassination of Ngo Dinh Diem
- 1963 South Vietnamese coup
