= Mai Hữu Xuân =

South Vietnamese general

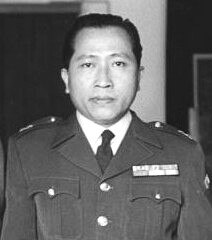
- Born: 1917; Quảng Bình province, Protectorate of Annam, French Indochina
- Died: unknown Southern California, United States
- Military career
- Allegiance: State of Vietnam; South Vietnam
- Branch: Vietnamese National Army; Army of the Republic of Vietnam
- Service years: 1940–1965
- Rank: Lieutenant General (Trung Tướng)
- Commands: National Police (November 1963 – January 1964)
- Conflicts: 1963 South Vietnamese coup
- Other work: Mayor of Saigon (November 1963 – January 1964)

Major General Mai Hữu Xuân was a general of the Army of the Republic of Vietnam (ARVN) and a participant in the November 1963 coup that deposed President Ngô Đình Diệm and ended in his assassination.

Xuân started his career in the Vietnamese National Army of the French-backed State of Vietnam and worked in military security and was made an ARVN general, but was later put into a minor job by Diệm. During the coup against Diệm, Xuân led trainee enlisted men in a successful attack on the headquarters of the National Police, and the secret police. Xuân then led a group that arrested Diệm and his younger brother and chief adviser, Ngô Đình Nhu, after their hiding place was discovered. During the trip back to headquarters, the Ngô brothers were assassinated, leading to a debate over who gave the order.

During 1964, Xuân was a member of the ruling junta, and served as the mayor of Saigon and the head of the National Police, during which time he was accused of arresting people for ransom. After three months, the junta was overthrown by General Nguyễn Khánh and Xuân was arrested along with Generals Trần Văn Đôn, Lê Văn Kim and Tôn Thất Đính, accused of plotting to make peace with the communists and making South Vietnam a neutral state. Khánh was able to find evidence and his military tribunal convicted them of "lax morality", and being unqualified to command due to a "lack of a clear political concept". Xuân and his colleagues were put under house arrest for a period, before being released and compulsorily retired after a service limit was introduced.

== Early career ==
Xuân was born in 1917 in Quảng Bình province in the Protectorate of Annam. In 1937, he graduated from the French-language junior high school program in Saigon with a Thành Chung diploma. Afterwards, he was appointed as a non-civil servant, serving as the station master of Xóm Gà railway station. In 1940, he began his career in the French secret police and was recruited as an informant for the French Federal Security Service in Indochina (the Sûreté générale indochinoise).

He served under Prime Minister Nguyễn Văn Tâm during the French-backed State of Vietnam era in the 1950s in military security. When Diệm became Prime Minister of the State of Vietnam, Xuân fought for him as an officer in the Vietnamese National Army (VNA) in the Battle for Saigon in May 1955, against the Bình Xuyên organised crime syndicate that sought to take over the capital. The VNA dismantled the Bình Xuyên and Xuân was made a general. Xuân turned against Diệm after he was relegated to a minor job, and he readily joined the plot against Diệm as opposition to his rule grew in 1963.

== Diệm assassination ==
The ARVN conducted a coup against Diệm on 1 November 1963, and Xuân led some of the units. He used some newly enlisted troops from the Quang Trung National Training Center to capture the headquarters of the National Police, which included the secret police under the direct control of Diệm's brother and adviser, Nhu.

The next morning Diệm and Nhu, who had escaped from the siege on the palace, agreed to surrender. The coup leader, General Dương Văn Minh dispatched a convoy to pick them up from their hideout in Cholon. The convoy was led by Xuân and consisted of Colonels Nguyễn Văn Quan and Dương Ngọc Lắm. Quan was Minh's deputy, and Lắm had been the commander of Diệm's Civil Guard until defecting mid-way through the coup once a rebel victory seemed assured. Two further officers made up the convoy: Major Dương Hiếu Nghĩa and Captain Nguyễn Văn Nhung, Minh's bodyguard.

When the officers arrived, Diệm requested that the convoy stop at the palace so that he could gather personal items before being exiled. Xuân turned him down, clinically stating that his orders were to take the brothers directly to headquarters. Nhu expressed disgust that they were to be transported in an armoured personnel carrier (APC), asking "You use such a vehicle to drive the president?" Xuân said that it was selected to protect them from "extremists". Xuân ordered the brothers' hands be tied behind their backs before shoving them into the carrier. One officer asked to shoot Nhu, but Xuân turned him down. He didn't want to kill Nhu at that point as he purportedly intended to torture Nhu for money.

After the arrest, Nhung and Nghĩa sat with the Ngô brothers in the APC. Before dispatching the convoy, Minh was reported to have gestured to Nhung with two fingers. This was taken as the order to kill the Ngô brothers. As the convoy on the route to the Joint General Staff headquarters, Xuân ordered the APC to stop over at a National Police station where he brutally tortured Nhu and Diệm, asking them where they had hidden money. When they refused to release the information, Xuân killed them with his pistol. An investigation by Đôn later determined Nghĩa shot the brothers at point-blank range with a semi-automatic firearm and that Nhung sprayed them with bullets before repeatedly stabbing the bodies with a knife without realizing that both the brothers had already been killed by Xuân.

The generals were shocked to see the dead bodies and Đôn ordered another officer to tell reporters that the brothers had died in an accident. He went to confront Minh in his office.

Đôn: Why are they dead?
Minh: And what does it matter that they are dead?

At this time, Xuân walked into Minh's office through the open door, unaware of Đôn's presence. Xuân snapped to attention and stated "Mission accomplie". Although the blame was widely placed on Minh, U.S. Ambassador Henry Cabot Lodge Jr. thought that Xuân was partly culpable asserting that "Diệm and Nhu had been assassinated, if not by Xuân personally, at least at his direction."

== Junta and overthrow ==
Under the military junta, Xuân served as the national police chief. He was accused of arresting people en masse, before releasing them in return for bribes and pledges of loyalty. Xuân did not survive long in his new post. General Khánh, disgruntled that Minh and the other leading generals did not offer him a position in the 12-man junta, began to plot. Khánh was transferred to command I Corps, based around Huế and Đà Nẵng in the far north of Vietnam. Khánh had wanted a transfer to the IV Corps in the Mekong Delta close to Saigon, close to the political intrigue.

Khánh joined forces with other ambitious officers who resented the MRC for giving jobs they felt were insignificant. These included Brigadier General Đỗ Mậu, the Minister of Information, Colonel Nguyễn Chánh Thi, and General Khiệm, who had been demoted from being Chief of Staff of the ARVN to the commander of the III Corps that surrounded Saigon, which meant that he controlled the troops near the capital.

At the time, French president Charles de Gaulle was contemplating recognising the People's Republic of China and wanted Southeast Asia neutralised as part of his agenda to cultivate relations with the communist bloc. De Gaulle wanted the United States out of South Vietnam. Khánh told various American officials that Generals Xuân, Đôn, Minh, and Lê Văn Kim were "pro-French and pro-neutralist" and part of de Gaulle's plan. Before dawn on 30 January, Khánh and his colleagues seized power in a bloodless coup before dawn, catching the MRC completely off guard. Khánh had Xuân arrested, along with Minh, Đôn, Kim and Tôn Thất Đính, claiming that they were part of a neutralist plot with the French. Khánh noted they had served in the French-backed Vietnamese National Army in the early 1950s, although he had done so as well. The generals were flown to My Khe beach, near Đà Nẵng and placed under house arrest.

== Retribution by Khánh ==
On May 28 1964, Khanh put his rivals on trial. The generals were secretly interrogated for five and a half hours, mostly about details of their coup against Diệm, rather than the original charge of promoting neutralism. As all of the officers were involved in the plot against Diệm, this did not reveal any information new to them. The court deliberated for over nine hours, and when it reconvened for the verdict on May 29, Khánh stated, "We ask that once you begin to serve again in the army, you do not take revenge on anybody". The tribunal then "congratulated" Xuân and his colleagues, but found that they were of "lax morality", unqualified to command due to a "lack of a clear political concept". Xuân and his fellow generals were chastised for being "inadequately aware of their heavy responsibility" and of letting "their subordinates take advantage of their positions". They were allowed to remain in Đà Lạt under surveillance with their families.

Xuân was barred from commanding troops, as were his colleagues. An office was prepared so that he could participate in "research and planning". Worried that Xuân and his idle colleagues would plot against him, Khánh made arrangements to send them to the United States for military study, but this fell through. In any case, the younger generation of officers forcibly retired Xuân and the other generals by making it compulsory for officers to retire after 25 years of military service. When Khánh was himself deposed in 1965, he handed over dossiers proving that Xuân and his colleagues were innocent.

== Final years ==
After being forcibly retired, Xuân, along with former Lieutenant Generals Trần Văn Đôn and Lê Văn Kim, established the DOXUKI Import-Export Company. Before the Fall of Saigon, Xuân was evacuated from Saigon on a naval warship alongside Brigadier General Nguyễn Thành Hoàng and Colonel Nguyễn Hồng Đài (the son-in-law of Dương Văn Minh) on 29 April 1975. He later died from heart disease on an unknown date while living in Northern California.

== Sources ==
- Hammer, Ellen J. (1987). A Death in November: America in Vietnam, 1963. New York: E. P. Dutton. ISBN 0-525-24210-4.
- Jacobs, Seth (2006). Cold War Mandarin: Ngo Dinh Diem and the Origins of America's War in Vietnam, 1950–1963. Lanham, Maryland: Rowman & Littlefield. ISBN 0-7425-4447-8.
- Jones, Howard (2003). Death of a Generation: how the assassinations of Diem and JFK prolonged the Vietnam War. New York: Oxford University Press. ISBN 0-19-505286-2.
- Kahin, George McT. (1979). "Political Polarization in South Vietnam: U.S. Policy in the Post-Diem Period". Pacific Affairs. 52 (4). Vancouver, British Columbia: 647–673. doi:10.2307/2757066.
- Karnow, Stanley (1997). Vietnam: A history. New York: Penguin Books. ISBN 0-670-84218-4.
- Langguth, A. J. (2000). Our Vietnam: the war, 1954–1975. New York: Simon & Schuster. ISBN 0-684-81202-9.
- Logevall, Fredrik (2006). "The French recognition of China and its implications for the Vietnam War". In Roberts, Priscilla (ed.). Behind the bamboo curtain : China, Vietnam, and the world beyond Asia. Stanford, California: Stanford University Press. ISBN 0-8047-5502-7.
- Moyar, Mark (2006). Triumph Forsaken: The Vietnam War, 1954–1965. New York: Cambridge University Press. ISBN 0-521-86911-0.
- Shaplen, Robert (1966). The Lost Revolution: Vietnam 1945–1965. London: André Deutsch.
- Tucker, Spencer C. (2000). Encyclopedia of the Vietnam War: A Political, Social and Military History. Santa Barbara, California: ABC-CLIO. ISBN 1-57607-040-9.
