= Nối vòng tay lớn =

1968 song by Trịnh Công Sơn

"Nối Vòng Tay Lớn"
- Sheet music

Song by Trịnh Công Sơn
- Language: Vietnamese
- English title: The Great Circle of Vietnam; Join Hands in a Great Circle
- Written: 1968
- Published: 1970
- Recorded: 1969

"Nối vòng tay lớn" (Vietnamese pronunciation: [noj˧˦ vɔwŋ͡m˨˩ taj˧˧ lən˧˥], English: Joining Hands in a Great Circle), also known in English as "The Great Circle of Vietnam", is an anti-war song written by South Vietnamese musician Trịnh Công Sơn. It was first recorded by singer Khánh Ly for the 1969 album Hát cho quê hương Việt Nam 1 (English: Sing for the Homeland Vietnam) and was first published in the 1970 song collection Kinh Việt Nam (English: Vietnamese Scriptures). Written during the Vietnam War, the song expresses Sơn's hope for the reunification of North and South Vietnam and an end to the conflict.

During the war, "Nối vòng tay lớn" was frequently performed as part of South Vietnam's anti-war student and youth movement. It later became known as the first song broadcast on Radio Saigon after the surrender announcement of the South Vietnamese government on 30 April 1975. Although widely associated with national reunification, public performances of the song were prohibited after the war until April 2017.

== Background and composition ==
Trịnh Công Sơn wrote the song amid the South Vietnam's youth protest movement. Following the opening of the 1968 Paris Peace Accords talks about ending the Vietnam War, Sơn became hopeful that the conflict would soon come to an end. Reflecting this optimism, he composed "Nối vòng tay lớn", envisioning peace as a time of reconciliation and national reunification. The song was initially titled "Tiếng hát dã tràng ca" ("The Song of the Sand Crab").

Unlike many of his earlier songs, which are characterized by a melancholic tone, "Nối vòng tay lớn" has a cheerful and powerful melody. Its rhythm follows a simple 2/4 time signature, resembling marching songs. To emphasize the theme of national unity, Sơn used the word "nối" ("to connect" or "to join") thirteen times throughout the lyrics, including in the title. Trinh My Luu and Nu-Anh Tran, in an article published in the Journal of Vietnamese Studies, highlight the verse "From all over the land our brothers and sisters return / We come together happily like swirling grains of sand in a sandstorm / We join our hands to make a great circle of Vietnam", (Note: Original verse: "Mặt đất bao la anh em ta về gặp nhau / Mừng như bão cát quay cuồng trời rộng / Bàn tay ta nắm nối tròn một vòng Việt Nam.") writing that its imagery of a gathering sandstorm and joined hands symbolizes the reunification of the Vietnamese people and their transcendence of political divisions. Nu-Anh further wrote that the song exemplifies Sơn's distinctive lyrical style and reflects his lifelong interest in Buddhism. The phrase “cycle of birth and death” (Note: Original phrase: "một vòng tử sinh") in the last line alludes to reincarnation, and the lyrics as a whole emphasize the union of seemingly separate or opposing elements while alluding to the Buddhist concept of nonduality.

== Release and reception ==
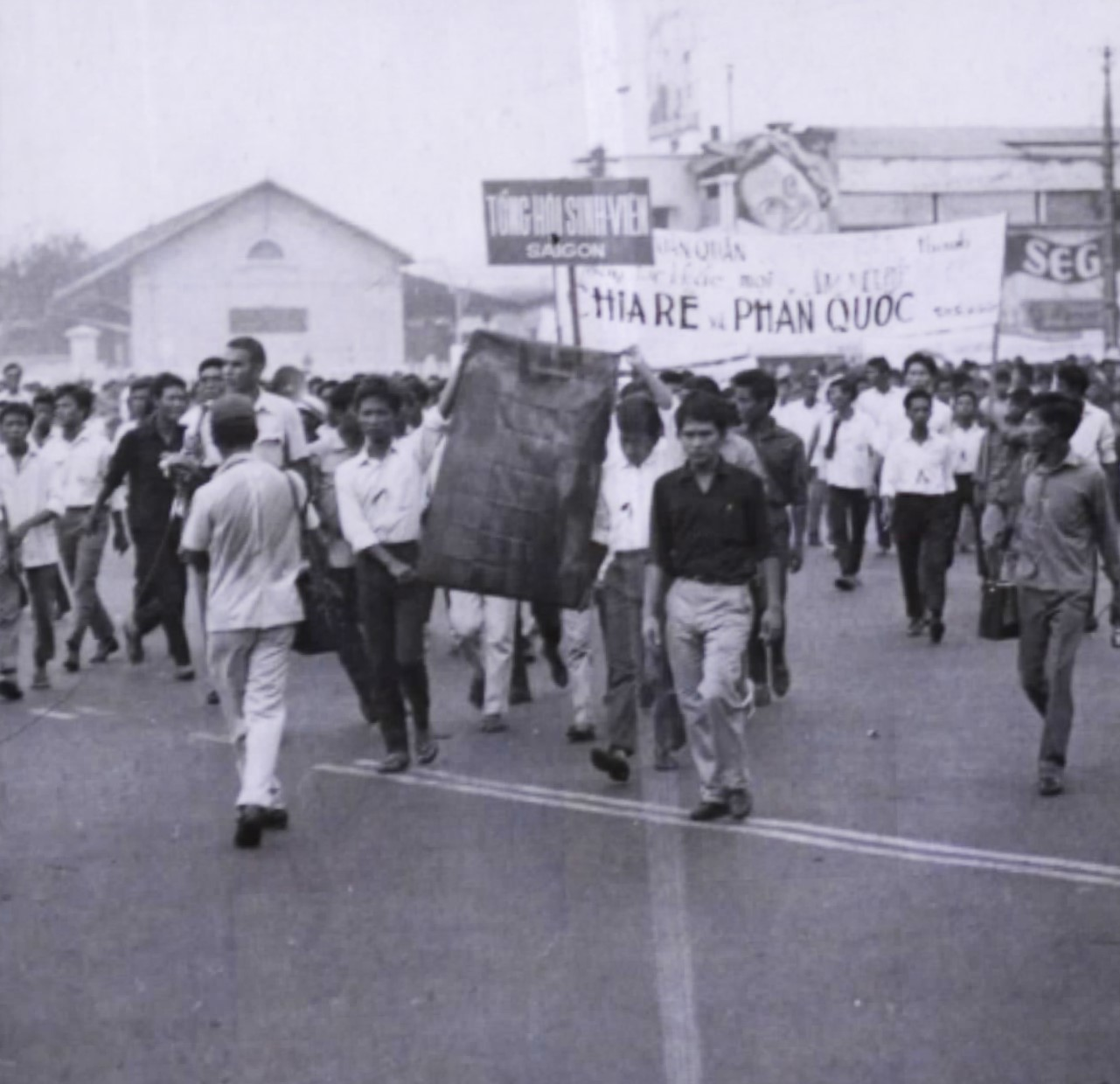
The Saigon Student Union was the leading force of student movement in Saigon.

In 1969, "Nối vòng tay lớn" was first recorded by singer Khánh Ly for the album Hát cho quê hương Việt Nam 1, the album has a total of 25 songs by Trịnh Công Sơn. One year later, it was officially published in Sơn's songs collection Kinh Việt Nam. On 25 April 1970, (Note: Đại biểu Nhân dân Newspaper and VnExpress said that it was 24 April. Source from Tuổi Trẻ said that it was 20 April.) Sơn introduced the song at a gathering entitled after it, which he and his friend Ngô Kha organized at a student camp in a forest near Thuận An, Huế, attended by students from Quốc Học – Huế High School for the Gifted. The song was subsequently frequently used as an opening song for youth gatherings and spread throughout Vietnam through the youth movement between 1970 and 1975. Former Saigon Student Union leader Lê Văn Nuôi recalled that members of the Saigon student movement before and after 1975 frequently sang "Nối vòng tay lớn" while holding hands and clapping together. He described the song as expressing a far-sighted aspiration for peace and national reunification, arguing that it anticipated Vietnam's eventual reunification. John C. Schafer wrote in the book Trinh Cong Son and Bob Dylan that it is "rough equivalent" to an American patriotic song "America the Beautiful" which glorifies the unity of people in the country.

== Legacy ==
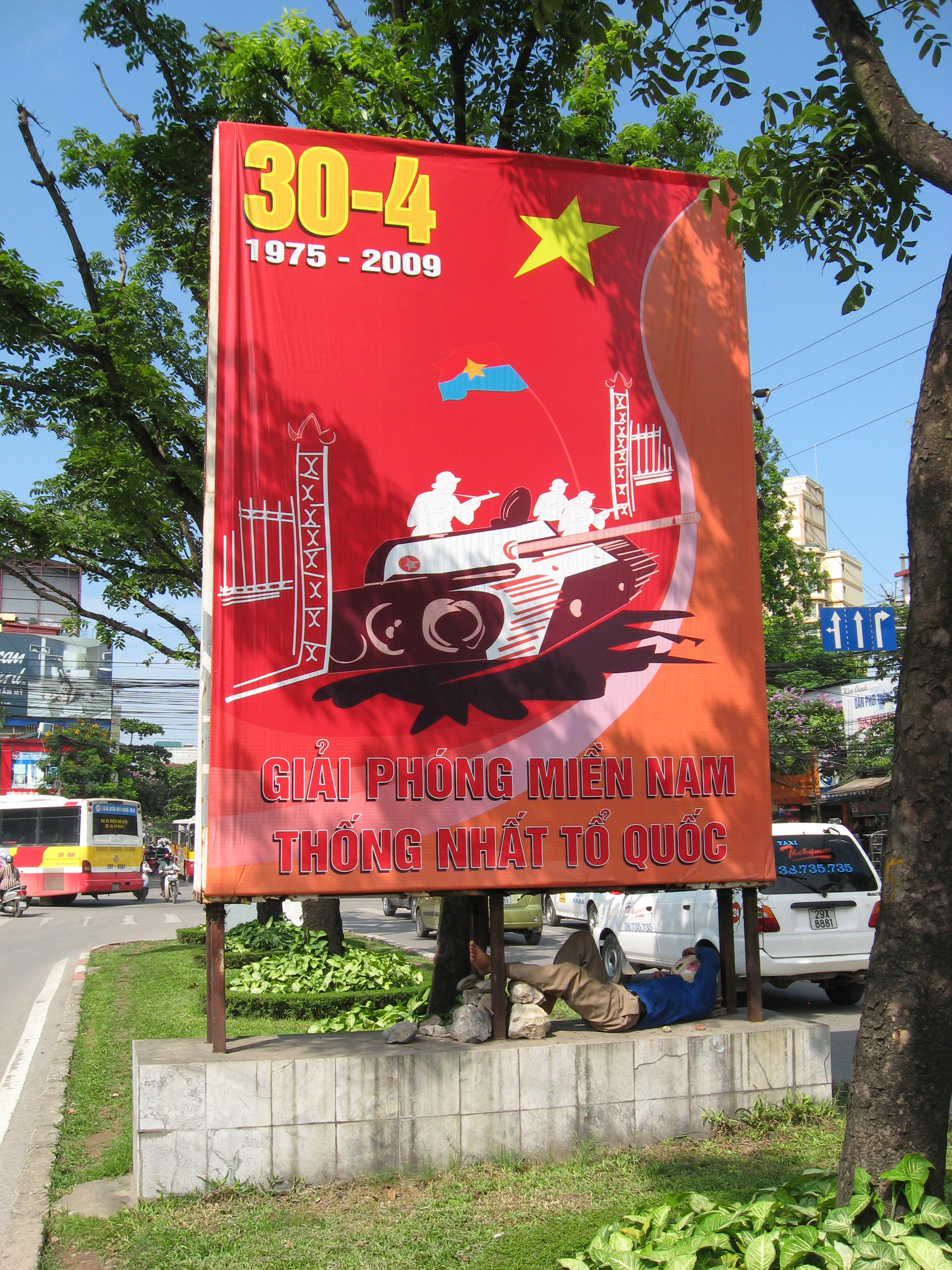
A Reunification Day poster in Hanoi. "Nối Vòng Tay Lớn" has become closely associated with this day.

On 30 April 1975, as the Liberation Army of South Vietnam forces entered Saigon and advanced toward the Independence Palace, President Dương Văn Minh and Prime Minister Vũ Văn Mẫu were escorted to Radio Saigon to broadcast their surrender statements. Trịnh Công Sơn was among those gathered at the station and was invited to perform "Nối Vòng Tay Lớn". Writer and former soldier Nguyễn Văn Thọ later recalled that the performance had "a calming effect on the soldiers" at a moment when "the lives of millions hung by a thread".

Since Trịnh Công Sơn's death in 2001, "Nối vòng tay lớn" has frequently been used as the title of tribute concerts to him, as well as programs commemorating Vietnam's reunification. In 2001, a program named after the song was established to commemorate him, attracting tens of thousands of attendees each year between 2012 and 2016. During an event at Mỹ Đình Stadium on 24 May 2014, motivational speaker Nick Vujicic ended his speech by singing the song together with approximately 20,000 participants. In his visit in Vietnam in 2016, then-president of the U.S. Barack Obama quoted the song in his speech, saying that Vietnam and the United States should "open their hearts to understand each other". On 18 April 2026, the Vietnamese Embassy in Singapore and Trịnh Công Sơn's family organized the tribute concert Nối Vòng Tay Lớn – A Tribute to Love & Peace at the Yong Siew Toh Conservatory of Music. The event was attended by diplomatic representatives from several countries, including China, Portugal, Italy, Turkey, the United States, Japan, the Philippines, and Thailand.

The song's lyrics were engraved on a stone monument in Trịnh Công Sơn Park in Huế. Installed behind the musician's bronze statue overlooking the Hương River, the monument is approximately 5 metres (200 in) high and weighs about 21,000 kilograms (46,000 lb).

== Licensing issue ==
Prior to 11 April 2017, the song was not included among the pre-1975 works licensed for public performance by the Department of Performing Arts, and organizations wishing to perform the work were required to submit an application to the department. Officials from the Department of Performing Arts explained that no organization had ever applied for permission to disseminate the song under government decrees. Director Nguyễn Đăng Chương also stated that no performer had previously sought official permission to perform the work publicly. On 12 April 2017, the Department finally granted a public performance license for the song after receiving an application submitted by Huế University of Medicine.

The prohibition attracted widespread criticism in the Vietnamese media. Writer Văn Công Hùng of Dân Việt described the authorities' handling of the issue as an "authoritarian, rigid, and insensitive way of working". Vương Duy Biên, the Deputy Minister of Culture, Sports and Tourism, similarly described the prohibition of the song, along with four other pre-1975 songs, that it is "rigid".

== Bibliography ==
- John C., Schafer; Như Quỳnh, Schafer (1 May 2025). "Join Hands in a Great Circle [Nối vòng tay lớn]". Journal of Vietnamese Studies. 20 (2) – via University of California Press.
- My Luu, Trinh; Tran, Nu-Anh (1 May 2025). "Rupture and Reunion: New Translations About the End of the War in Vietnam". Journal of Vietnamese Studies. 20 (2) – via University of California Press.
- John C., Schafer (13 December 2023). Trịnh Công Sơn and Bob Dylan: Essays on War, Love, Songwriting, and Religion. ISBN 978-1962081054.
