= Jordan Ritter =

American businessman (born 1978)

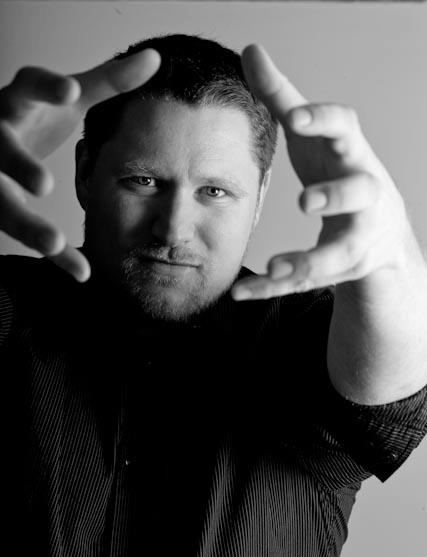
- Born: Jordan Ritter; February 1, 1978 (age 48); Northridge, California, United States
- Education: Lehigh University
- Website: www.darkridge.com/~jpr5/

Jordan Ritter (born February 1, 1978) is an American serial entrepreneur, software architect and angel investor. He is best known for his work at Napster, the file-sharing service he co-founded along with Shawn Fanning and others. His time at Napster was documented in Joseph Menn's book All the Rave: The Rise and Fall of Shawn Fanning's Napster and Alex Winter's film Downloaded.

== Early life ==
Jordan Ritter was born in Northridge, California and grew up in Texas and Florida. Ritter skipped the 5th grade when he was 10, and later went on to graduate from the International Baccalaureate Program at Hillsborough High School. Ritter attended college at Lehigh University on scholarship, starting as a sophomore and pursuing a double major in music and computer science. He dropped out in 1998, relocating to Boston, Massachusetts to begin his career in computer security.

== Career ==
=== Netect ===
Ritter started out in the computer security industry, working as a paid hacker for the Boston office of Israeli computer security company Netect. While his main focus was probing major software and online systems for vulnerabilities, he also fixed code and conducted security audits for the company's own software HackerShield.

During his tenure, Ritter discovered and published several serious security vulnerabilities, including an anonymous, remote administrative privilege escalation in Washington University's FTP server. At the time, this affected approximately 80% of all computers on the Internet.

Early in 1999, Netect was purchased by BindView. Ritter was retained in the acquisition.

=== Napster ===
While working for BindView, Ritter met Shawn Fanning online through an IRC channel for computer hackers called #!w00w00. In May 1999, Fanning began soliciting Ritter and several other w00w00 members for help.

Since Fanning initially refused to allow inspection of the source code, members took this as a challenge and began reverse-engineering various aspects of the service. Ritter and fellow w00w00 member Seth McGann focused on the protocol and backend software, identifying bugs and proposing likely fixes to Fanning, while w00w00 member Evan Brewer managed the system that the server ran on. In early June 1999, Fanning asked Ritter to fully take over development of the server while Fanning focused on the Windows client. Two months later, Yosi Amram invested $250,000 in Napster and required that company operations relocate from Massachusetts to California. Ritter moved to Silicon Valley in September 1999, initially sharing an apartment with Fanning and Sean Parker at the San Mateo Marriott Residence Inn.

Ritter was directly responsible for many of the key evolutions of the backend service architecture during Napster's period of hyper-growth, including its novel load-balancing system, MySQL and subsequent Oracle database integration, and transparent full-mesh server linking. In addition to leading the backend team, Ritter also managed production systems deployment and network security, database systems and supporting infrastructure, and served as primary public contact point for all security-related issues concerning the service and operations. Ritter also oversaw the Moderator Community, a group of individuals who volunteered their free time to help moderate the various socially-focused portions of the Napster service.

Ritter resigned from Napster on November 14, 2000.

=== Cloudmark ===
In the summer of 2001, Ritter started development on anti-spam technology using machine-learning statistical classification algorithms. Named Spilter, the software was originally an open-source system that ran on UNIX-compatible messaging infrastructure such as Sendmail, Postfix and Qmail. Following the success of the product's first release, Ritter was convinced to pursue it instead as a commercial enterprise, which led him to close-source the software and begin mapping out a business plan.

Later that summer, Ritter discovered an open-source collaborative filtering program for email called Vipul's Razor, authored by Vipul Ved Prakash. Ritter reached out to Prakash (IRC nickname: hackworth) over an IRC channel for Perl programmers called #perl, proposing the two join their respective technologies together and form a company around the result. After a week of brainstorming on a whiteboard, the two agreed to form SEPsoft (Sodalitas Eliminetatum Purgamentum). Prakash later proposed using the name of Cloudmark instead, which is a planet-sized, inter-galactic messaging router featured in the book A Fire Upon the Deep by Vernor Vinge.

Throughout his tenure during 2001–2006, Ritter oversaw the architectural design and implementation of all Cloudmark commercial software, systems and operating infrastructure.

Ritter resigned as CTO in February 2006.

=== Columbia Music Entertainment ===
Ritter was introduced to Columbia Music Entertainment (CME) CEO Sadahiko Hirose in early 2006 during a business trip to Tokyo. Hirose planned to modernize CME by building a digital media distribution platform for its 100-year-spanning catalog of music, much of which was being lost to physical degradation and abandoned digital recording formats.

Ritter joined CME in February 2006 as Executive Advisor to the CEO. In April 2006 he became CTO.

In 2007, Ritter hired Ejovi Nuwere into CME, and together they began building a Japanese-based, competition-oriented promotional platform for new artists called Otorevo. The premise of the project was to prove a more cost- and time-efficient model for discovering viable artists to join the label, while at the same time establishing the first foothold for what would become CME's digital media platform. Despite the measurable successes of Otorevo, the CME Board of Directors voted to terminate all R&D projects in March 2008.

Ritter left CME in April 2008.

=== Zivity ===
After returning from Japan, Ritter was asked by Zivity Founders Scott Banister and Cyan Banister to advise the company on internal engineering management issues. Shortly afterwards, Ritter joined as CTO in order to overhaul the engineering organization while a CEO search was being conducted. In December 2008, a new CEO was appointed and Ritter left the company.

Ritter is an investor in Zivity.

=== CloudCrowd/Servio ===
Ritter founded crowdsourcing company CloudCrowd with Alex Edelstein in April 2009. 6 months later, CloudCrowd officially launched its work platform on Facebook. In December 2010 the company renamed itself Servio while retaining the CloudCrowd brand, in order to more effectively differentiate the value propositions between online work and the crowdsourced work product.

As CTO, Ritter oversaw all architectural design and development of the company's services, systems and production infrastructure. As Head of Engineering, he also directly managed all Engineering, Ops, IT and QA personnel.

Ritter left Servio in December 2012.

=== Atlas Recall ===
Atlas Recall is a search engine for an individual's information normally stored in different email and storage systems. This was originally called Savant Recall and was created by Paul Musgrave, Mark Wang and Kasey Robinson.

== Other accomplishments ==
- Entrepreneur Magazine's "100 Most Brilliant Companies", June 2010
- Nominated for Software Designer of the Year, WIRED Rave Awards, 2002
- Interviewed in Playboy Magazine, April 2001
- Member of InfoWorld CTO Advisory Council, 2001
- Co-author of 4 US patents and 2 EU patents

== Open-source ==
Ritter is a lifelong contributor to open-source software and the free software movement.

Notable software projects include:

- ngrep
- orapp
- mongo-locking distributed locking service in Ruby for MongoDB
- DataObjects SQL API layer for Ruby
- DataMapper ORM framework for Ruby
- DataMapper Salesforce adapter
