= Sadahiko =

- Gender: Male

Origin
- Origin: Japanese
- Meaning: Different meanings depending on the kanji used

Sadahiko (written: 禎彦 or 貞彦) is a masculine Japanese given name. Notable people with the name include:

- Sadahiko Hirose (廣瀬 禎彦; born 1943), Japanese businessman
- Sadahiko Miyake (三宅 貞彦; 1891–1956), Imperial Japanese Army general
