= Arthur Wyndham =

Australian broadcasting executive

Arthur Winchester Wyndham (1925–2023) was an Australian broadcasting executive who was a key figure in the development of the Australian Broadcasting Corporation (ABC).

== Early life and education ==
Born on February 14, 1925, to a Scottish family, Wyndham served in the Royal Australian Navy as a radar officer during World War II. His service included the Pacific War, and he was present in Japan after the atomic bombing of Hiroshima.

== Career ==
Wyndham began his career at the ABC in 1947 as an announcer, a role in which he initially used the BBC-style accent that was standard for the broadcaster at the time. He later undertook a secondment with the BBC to train in television production.

In 1956, he returned to Australia for the launch of ABC TV and became the corporation's first producer trained in outdoor broadcasting. In this capacity, he was involved in the coverage of the Melbourne Olympics and directed numerous early televised sports and music broadcasts. During the Vietnam War, he was sent to advise Radio Saigon on transitioning its operations from propaganda to reporting.

Upon his return to a senior management position in ABC radio in the 1970s, Wyndham implemented a policy to hire announcers who spoke with an Australian accent, stating that "Australians should sound Australian." In 1973, he led the establishment of the youth-focused radio station 2JJ, which is now known as Triple J. He also commissioned other programs, including The Science Show.

After his retirement from the ABC in 1985, Wyndham worked as a foreign correspondent, reporting on the fall of President Ferdinand Marcos in the Philippines. He also held a position with the Asia-Pacific Broadcasting Union.
