= Ejovi Nuwere =

American security engineer and entrepreneur

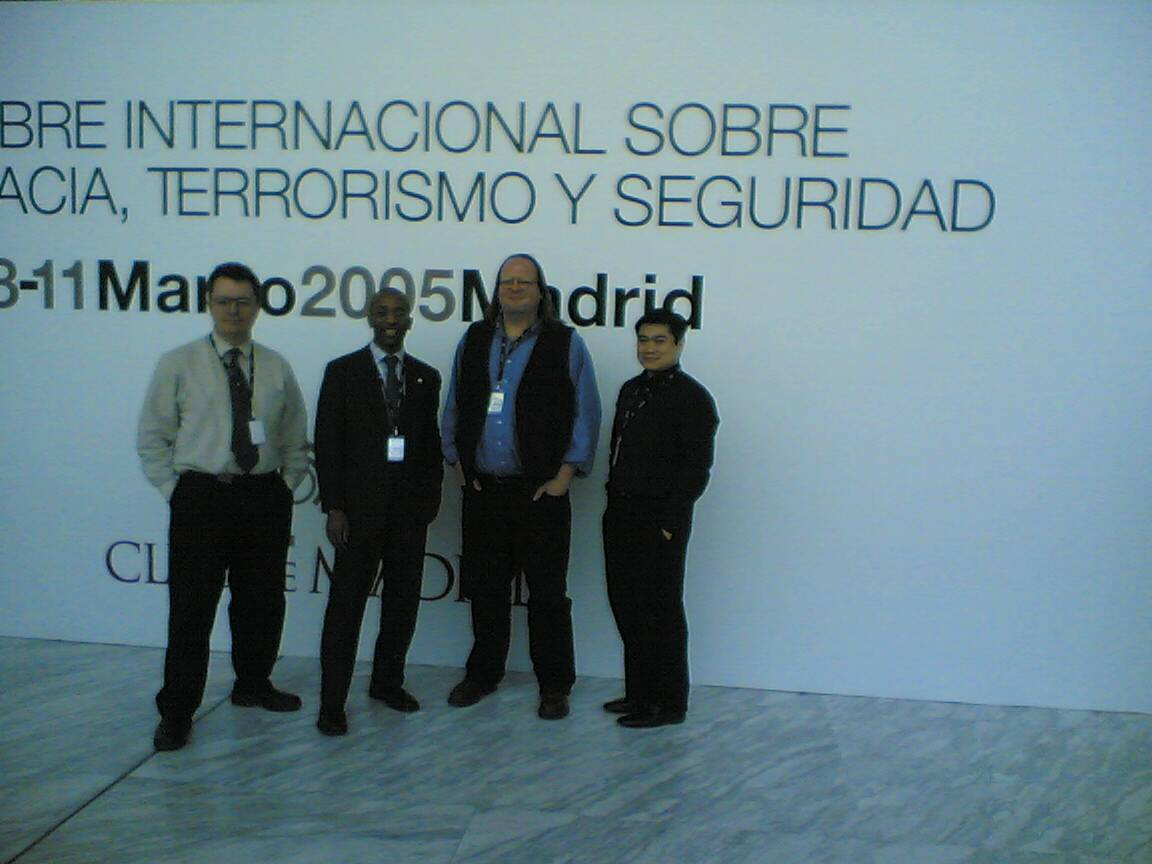
- Paul Vixie, Ejovi Nuwere, Ethan Zuckerman and Joichi Ito (2013)
- Born: Ejovi Nuwere c. 1980 (age 45–46); Brooklyn, New York
- Website: http://www.ejovi.net

Ejovi Nuwere (born c. 1980) is an American security engineer and entrepreneur. He was the co-founder of Google-funded wireless company Fon and Microsoft-funded analytics company Ivy Softworks.

== Early life ==
Nuwere's early life is documented in his autobiography, Hacker Cracker: A Journey from the Mean Streets of Brooklyn to the Frontiers of Cyberspace, written with David Chanoff. Despite the title, it is not focused solely on hacking. Nuwere writes about his mother's battle with drug addiction, and her death and his family's episodes of homelessness. The book was published by W. Morro in 2002 (ISBN 9780066210797). He is included in the standard reference work, Contemporary Authors.

Before he finished high school, he had established a life in the security research community as a member of w00w00 and an increasingly prominent career as a computer security consultant. At the age of twenty he was a security specialist for one of the world's largest financial houses.

== Career ==
Nuwere has founded a number of companies in the media and security space.

=== SecurityLab Technologies ===
Nuwere founded the VOIP security company SecurityLab and was selected by Business Week as one of the top young entrepreneurs under 25.

=== Kaori-san ===
Kaori-san is Japan's first virtual assistant service. The company launched in July 2013 as a spinout from Land Rush Group.

=== Re:mark ===
Re:mark is a joint venture with Japan's 4th largest newspaper publisher Sankei. Re:mark is a commenting system similar to Disqus and serves as 40M unique users across Japan per month. Acquired in 2013.

=== Fon ===
Nuwere was the North American founder of the wireless company Fon, at one time the largest WiFi network in the world. He launched the company in the USA and organized an A-list of digerati to join the company as advisors.

=== The Infrastructure of Democracy ===
In 2005, Nuwere gathered in Spain with a group of internet luminaries and security specialists that included Joi Ito, Jeff Moss, Chris Goggans and Dan Gillmore at the Madrid Summit to address the issue of terrorism and the internet. The result of the invite-only conference attended by Kofi Annan and several prime ministers was a document shared among the world's politicians that addressed how to best fight terrorism while protecting the freedoms associated with the web.

=== Columbia Music Entertainment ===
Nuwere led Columbia Music Entertainment's R&D division, working with CEO Sadahiko Hirose CTO Jordan Ritter, a childhood friend from his early computer security days. The team began building a Japanese-based, competition-oriented promotional platform for new artists called Otorevo. Despite the measurable successes of Otorevo, the company's board of directors voted to terminate all R&D projects in March 2008.

=== Sankei Shimbun ===
Nuwere has been a technology columnist for Sankei Shimbun, one of Japan's largest newspaper publishers since 2011.

== Juki Net ==
Nuwere was hired as a security researcher by the Governor of Nagano to audit Japan's National ID system Basic Resident Registers Network. The audit uncovered a number of serious security flaws with national repercussions. When he attempted to publicly discuss the security audit with permission from the Governor of Nagano, the national government prevented the presentation. Nuwere sued the national government for violation of free speech, and was the first foreigner to ever do so in Japan.
