= Đoàn Văn Toại =

Vietnamese-born naturalized American activist and the author (1945–2017)

- Born: 1945; Vietnam
- Died: November 2017 (aged 71–72); California, United States
- Occupations: Activist, author
- Years active: 1960s–2000s
- Known for: Advocacy for democracy in Vietnam, writings on political imprisonment
- Notable work: The Vietnamese Gulag

Đoàn Văn Toại (1945 in Vietnam – November 2017 in California) was a Vietnamese-born naturalized American activist and the author of The Vietnamese Gulag (Simon & Schuster, 1986).

== Biography ==
Toại became an antiwar activist, a supporter of the National Liberation Front and vice president of the Saigon Student Union in 1969 and 1970, and spent time in jails in South Vietnam for antigovernment activities as a student leader. After the invasion of the North Vietnamese Army and the end of the Vietnam War in 1975, Toại became a senior official of the Ministry of Finance under the Provisional Government. He soon disagreed on purely professional grounds with a superior official and was jailed for 28 months. Toại left Vietnam in May 1978 and went into exile in Paris.

In 1989, Toại was shot and seriously wounded by two Asian males as he was walking in the area around his home in California. The shooting happened during a spate of attacks on foreign resident dissident Vietnamese and was widely believed to have been politically motivated. Toại's advocacy of the recognition of the government of Vietnam and proposal that the US government should establish diplomatic ties was not universally liked in the Vietnamese community and there was speculation that he was shot by anti-Communist protestors.

Đoàn Văn Toại was also the author of these books:

- Documents on prisons in Viet-Nam
- A Vietcong Memoir (Mémoires d'un Vietcong, w/ Nhu Tang Truong, David Chanoff)
- Vietnam: A Portrait of its People at War (w/ David Chanoff)
- Portrait of the Enemy: The Other Side of Vietnam, Told through Interviews with North Vietnamese, Former Vietcong and Southern Opposition Leaders (w/ David Chanoff).

== See also ==
- Alexander Solzhenitsyn
