= Gramercy =

Gramercy means 'many thanks'. It is derived from the French term grand merci, meaning 'big thanks' which is still in use in the south of France's Provençal language as 'gramerci'. The term may refer to:

== Places in the United States ==
- Gramercy, Louisiana
- Gramercy Park, a private park and neighborhood in New York City
- Gramercy Park, Los Angeles

== Other uses ==
- Gramercy Books, an imprint of Random House
- The Gramercy Five, a quintet formed by bandleader Artie Shaw
- Gramercy Funds Management, an investment manager dedicated to global emerging markets based in Greenwich, Connecticut
- Gramercy Mansion, a historic building in Stevenson, Maryland
- Gramercy Pictures, a film studio, currently owned by Focus Features under Universal Pictures
- The Gramercy Residences, a supertall residential building in Makati, Philippines
- The Gramercy, a mixed-use development in the Las Vegas Valley
- Gramercy Tavern, a restaurant in New York City
- Gramercy Theatre, a venue in New York City
