= Saigon Student Union =

South Vietnamese student organization

Saigon - Gia Dinh Student Union
- Tổng hội Sinh viên Sài Gòn - Gia Định
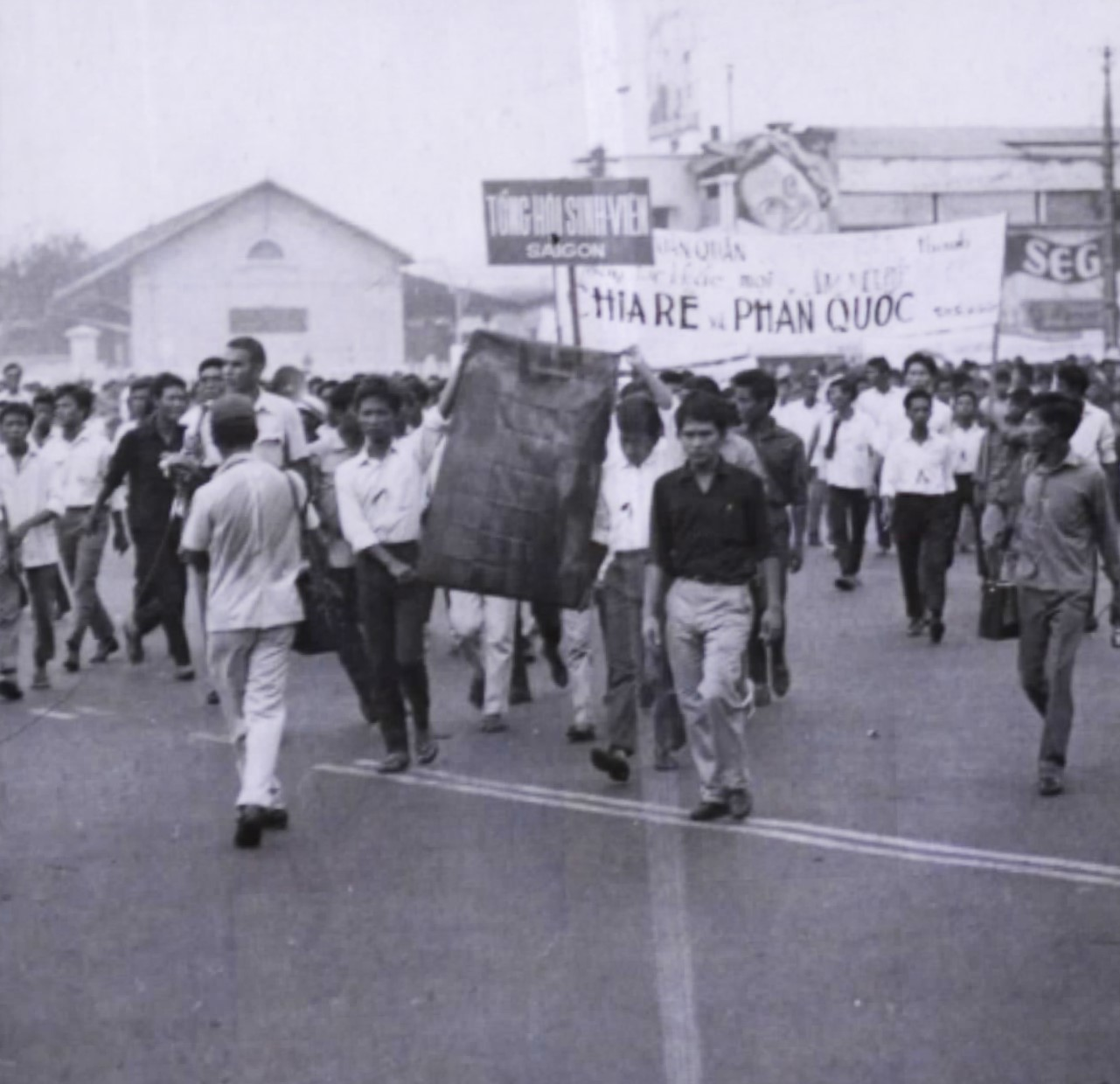
- The organization in a protest in 1964.
- Formation: 1963; 63 years ago
- Dissolved: 1975
- Type: Student activist organization
- Headquarters: Ho Chi Minh City Youth Cultural Center, Saigon
- Location: Saigon, Giadinh, South Vietnam

Saigon-Gia Dinh Student Union (Vietnamese: Tổng hội Sinh viên Sài Gòn - Gia Định), also known as Saigon Student Union, was a South Vietnamese organization representing university, academy and college students in Saigon and Gia Định.

Founded in 1963, the organization was known for leading student activism during the Vietnam War, particularly in movements opposing the South Vietnamese government, United States involvement, releasing political prisoners and ending the war. The organization did not join activities about opposing the government when they were led by neutral or government affiliated-students.

== Organization structure ==
Former leader Huỳnh Tấn Mẫm stated that while the Saigon government set up the union, they could not intervene it due to the democratic election process. The financial resources for the student movement and the Student Union relied solely on community support and donations. Tin Sáng was the most effective in gathering donation money.

At the time, the union had representatives from 17 faculties. The chairpersons of the faculty representative boards and the technical college board met annually to elect the Representative Board of the Union. Two sides of the union, the Saigon Government-affiliated students and the Viet Cong-affiliated, both sought to gain control of the Student Union.

== History ==
=== Establishment ===
The Saigon Student Union was founded in 1963, following a Saigon Student Delegates Congress. The headquarters were located in the Ho Chi Minh City Youth Cultural Center. After an election, Nguyễn Hữu Thái became the first chairman of the union.

=== Protests and political activity (1964–1968) ===
On 16 August 1964, the new Prime Minister of South Vietnam Nguyễn Khánh introduced the Vũng Tàu Charter. Amid concerns about a potential return of a dictatorship like Ngo Dinh Diem's, the students planned a protest.

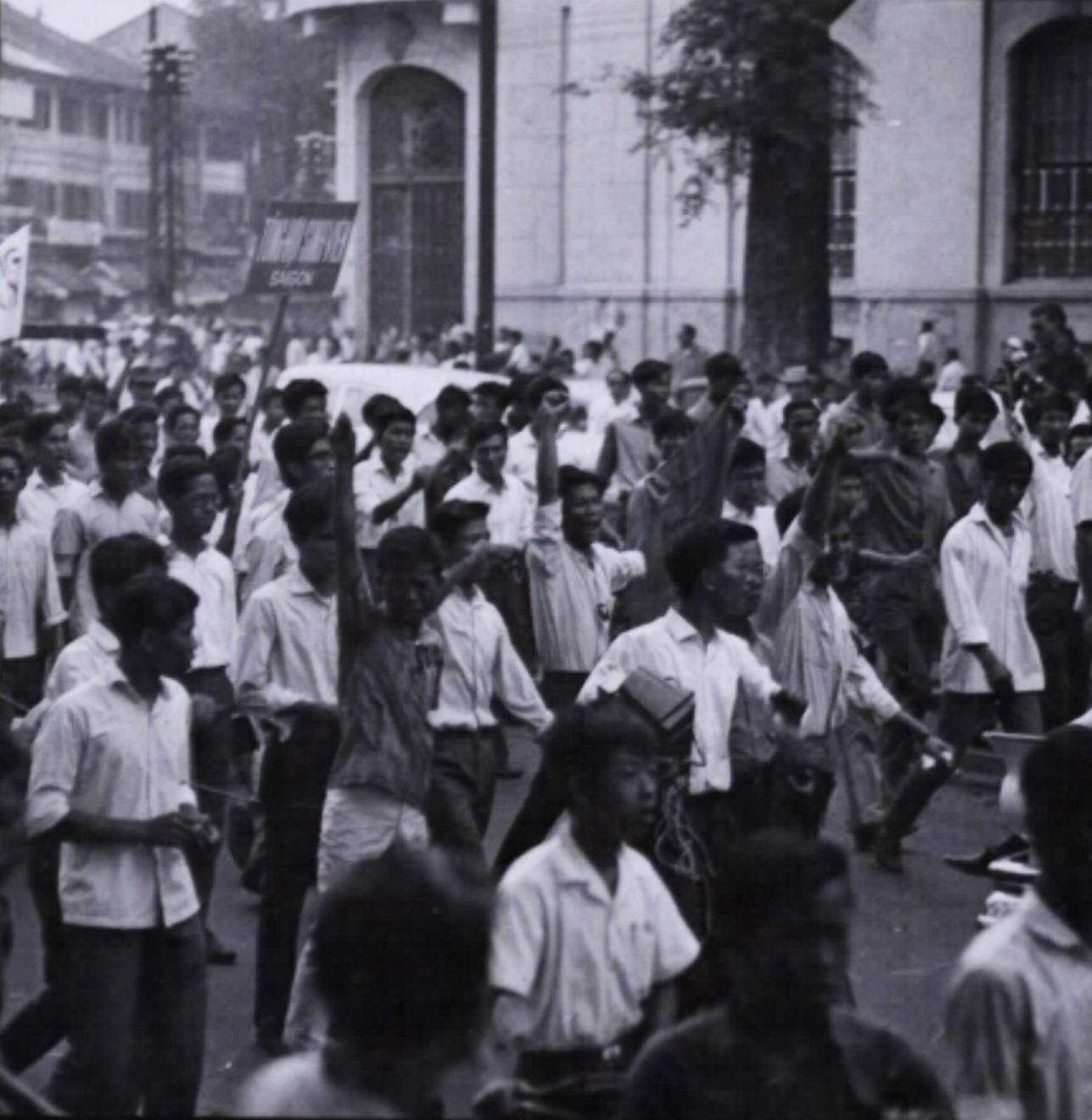
Students protest on 24 September 1964.

On the morning of 21 August, thousands of students gathered at the headquarters of the Saigon Student Union and then marched to the residence of Prime Minister Nguyễn Khánh, to demand the lifting of the curfew and set the deadline of 24 August. In response, their headquarters was set on fire after a counter-demonstration by a Catholics students group linked to the South Vietnamese government. On 23 August, following broadcasts by Radio Saigon alleging that the union satisfied with the Vũng Tàu Charter, more than two hundred students vandalized the radio as suggested by the chairman Thái, which he considered the first step to overthrow the new government. On 25 August, as the prime minister did not respond to the demands, a massive crowd with students and buddhists, estimated at hundreds of thousands, marched from the Bến Thành Market roundabout straight to Khánh's Palace. Khánh showed up and was immediately surrounded by the crowd, he then promised to revoke the constitution and resigned as the prime minister of the country.

On 14 November 1964, around one thousand and five hundreds students from the union and the buddhist students started a demonstration against the new Prime Minister Trần Văn Hương with banners and slogans, demanded his resignation as well as a cabinet reshuffle.

In December 1964, Thái and several other student leaders were ambushed by the police in the headquarters. As the chairman had been imprisoned, the students elected Lê Hữu Bôi, who was supported by RVNAF officer Nguyễn Trọng Nho of the Vietnamese Nationals' Party and was an anti Communist, to be the new chairman.

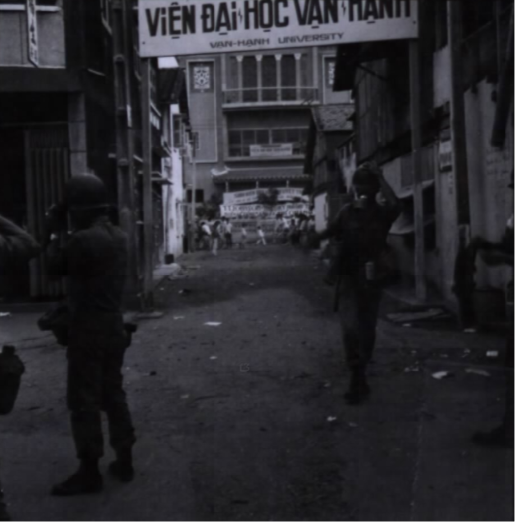
Soldiers watching a protest at Vạn Hạnh University on 18 June 1966.

In mid-1966, the students participated in protests against Nguyễn Văn Thiệu and Nguyễn Cao Kỳ's suppression of the uprising in Central Vietnam and participated in a large labor march, demanding peace and basic necessities on International Labor Day, May 1st. On 24 May 1966, students entered the headquarters of the Union, which at the time were chaired by pro-government Tô Lai Chánh, prompting Chánh to flee to Cần Thơ and resign. The student activists took control over the union again.

On 30 April 1967, Hồ Hữu Nhựt won the election and continued as the chairman of the union. On 30 September, 500 students protested in front of the Assembly Hall against the win of Thiệu 1967 South Vietnamese presidential election which they accused of being rigged, they stormed the government's huge election scoreboard and began tearing it down. Another protest happened on 2 October, the students sat down with their banners protesting the election, thirty-five of them were arrested and drafted to the army. After that, the police launched an attack on the headquarters by breaking windows and throwing tear gas grenades, force the leaders and hiding students to go outside. On 7 October, six student leaders were arrested while they were holding a news conference at the headquarters. On 1 December, when they tried to move toward the Assembly to demonstrate again, they were cut off by police and arrested. Most of them were drafted immediately into the army, including the chairman Nhựt. However, Nhựt and several others defected to the Viet Cong at the onset of the 1968 Tet offensive.

In 1968, as tensions grew between South Vietnam's President Nguyễn Văn Thiệu and Vice President Nguyễn Cao Kỳ, Kỳ reached out to the students union to gain support. He provided a room in his residence as their headquarters, along with office equipment and vehicles, as well as plane transport for them to attend demonstrations in Central Vietnam. In July 1968, two student newspapers in Saigon, including Sinh Viên Newspaper of the union, were confiscated and their editors and contributors were either jailed or killed.

=== Later activities and decline (1969–1975) ===
At the end of 1969, Nguyễn Văn Quỳ handed over the chairmanship of the union to vice president Huỳnh Tấn Mẫm after graduating. On 10 March 1970, Mẫm and 30 other students were arrested, led to a strong movement to demand their release across Saigon and other cities, involving students, religious groups, political organizations, and workers. On 21 March, students boycotted classes for three days and started hunger strikes. On 30 March, twelve more students were arrested after they attempted to start another hunger strike near the National Assembly. In response, estimated of six thousands students around the country organized another strike demanding the release. Four months later, the Saigon government temporarily released Mẫm and restored their headquarters, while five remained in jail.

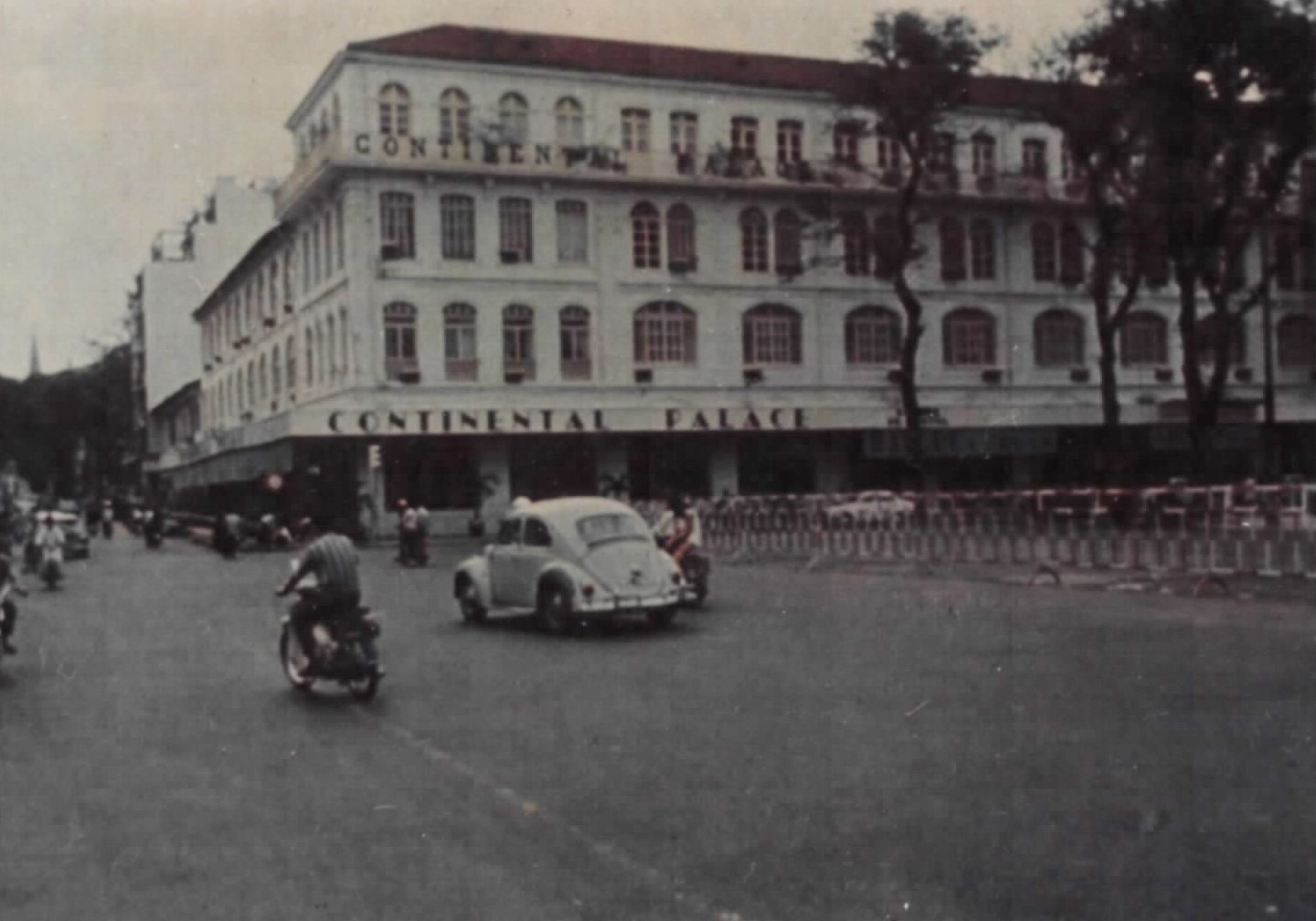
Hotel Continental Saigon, where the Union had a meeting with foreign anti-war students.

From 10 to 11 October, several anti-war students from the National Student Association (US), Belgium, Holland, Australia, New Zealand, along with Nobel-prize winner scientist George Wald arrived in South Vietnam. They gathered in Hotel Continental Saigon, held an international student conference and later took part in a demonstration. Most of them were later deported in the same day and many Vietnamese student leaders were arrested.

From December 1970 to 1971, a group of students led by the union launched a campaign involving setting American military vehicles on fire as retaliation against the killing of a young boy by two intoxicated US soldiers. On 18 September 1971, over one hundred students marched with torches and anti-President Nguyễn Văn Thiệu posters. They threw bombs, attacked police jeeps and vehicle carrying troops. In response, police fired tear gas and later got into a fight against them, two students were reported to be seriously injured in the fight. The female leader of the campaign Võ Thị Bạch Tuyết was then arrested in May 1972, after she and her group had set approximately 117 American vehicles on fire.

By 1971, Lý Bửu Lâm, who was considered more supportive of the South Vietnamese government, was elected chairman. Internal disputes within the union’s leadership continued between Lâm and Huỳnh Tấn Mẫm. On 28 June, Lê Khắc Sinh Nhật, the deputy chairman and a pro-government student, was shot and killed by two men, who also shot other students when they tried to escape. On 29 June, chairman Lâm was reported missing by the police, he was believed to be "hiding to escape the fate of Nhật". The assassins of the murder were later arrested, both of them admitted to have received orders from the Viet Cong-affiliated, who contested the previous council election result and believed the voters were bought by the government.

The Executive Committee of the General Student Union disbanded in 1972 because the Saigon government arrested all student leaders, they also confiscated the headquarters. From 1973 to 1975, many leaders and members either operated clandestinely or were imprisoned.

== Notable former members ==
Name	Notability	references
Nguyễn Hữu Thái	The first president of the Saigon Student Union, alumnus of Saigon University. Thái is known for being one of the observers of the Fall of Saigon at the Independence Palace, one of the broadcasters of Dương Văn Minh's surrender statement on Radio Saigon on 30 April 1975.	
Huỳnh Tấn Mẫm	President of the Union from 1969–1971, alumnus of Saigon Medical University. The founder and the first editor in chief of Thanh Niên Newspaper.	
Lê Hiếu Đằng	Member of the executive committee of the union, alumnus of Saigon Law University and Saigon Literature University. Former Vice Chairman of the Vietnam Fatherland Front.	
Nguyễn Đăng Trừng	President of the Union from 1967–1968, alumnus of Saigon Law University. Secretary of the Ho Chi Minh Communist Youth Union, member of the 12th Politburo before being expelled from the party.	
Hồ Hữu Nhựt	President of the Union from 1966–1967, alumnus of Saigon University. Former Deputy Minister of Ministry of Education and Training.	

== Sources ==
- Hữu Thái, Nguyễn (2018). Sài Gòn có một thời như thế [Saigon once had such a time] (in Vietnamese). Ho Chi Minh City General Publishing House. ISBN 9786045880364.
- Hữu Thái, Nguyễn (2013). Hành Trình Của Một Sinh Viên Sài Gòn Tư' Chiến Tranh Đến Hòa Bình [The Journey of a Saigon Student from War to Peace] (in Vietnamese). Culture and Arts Publishing House. ISBN 9786046806363.
- Marshall, Van Nguyen (1 May 2015). "Student Activism in Time of War: Youth in the Republic of Vietnam, 1960s–1970s". Journal of Vietnamese Studies. 10 (2).
