= W00w00 =

Computer security think tank

w00w00 (pronounced whoo-whoo) was a computer security think tank founded in 1996 and active until the early 2000s. Although this group was not well known outside information security circles, its participants have spawned more than a dozen IT companies, including WhatsApp and Napster.

== Participants ==
The group at one point included over 30 active participants and spanned 12 countries on five continents.

The following is a list of some of w00w00's participants:

- Christopher Abad
- Jonathan Bowie - founding member
- Josha Bronson - Director of Security at Yammer
- Silvio Cesare
- Matt Conover - a founding member
- Michael A. Davis - CTO of CounterTack
- Mark Dowd - co-founder Azimuth Security
- Joshua J. Drake - from Accuvant Labs
- Anthony Eufemio (tymat) - co-founder of Digix and an early Ethereum pioneer (made the first transaction on the Ethereum network and cpp-ethereum contributor)
- Shawn Fanning
- Simon Roses Femerling - formerly at Microsoft Research
- Jeff Forristal - one of the first people to document SQL injections
- Michael J. Freeman
- Jonathan Katz
- Jan Koum
- Ralph Logan
- Gordon Lyon
- Brian Martin
- David McKay - an early employee at Google and AdMob
- Seth McGann
- David Munson
- Jeff Nathan
- Tim Newsham
- Ejovi Nuwere
- Adam O’Donnell - co-founder of Immunet
- Sean Parker
- Alexander Peslyak
- Matt Ploessel
- Niels Provos
- Andrew Reiter - a researcher at Veracode
- Michael Ridpath
- Jordan Ritter
- Dragos Ruiu
- Tim Scanlon
- Dug Song - co-founder of Duo Security and Arbor Networks
- Tim Yardley - researcher in critical infrastructure security
- Anthony Zboralski
- Josh Reynolds

== Notable companies ==
A number of well known companies have been established by its participants.

- Arbor Networks
- Duo Security
- Napster
- nmap
- WhatsApp
