= Re-education camp (Vietnam) =

Prison camps operated by Communist Vietnam

Re-education camps (Vietnamese: Trại cải tạo) were prison camps operated by the communist Việt Cộng and Socialist Republic of Vietnam following the end of the Vietnam War. In these camps, the government imprisoned at least 200,000–300,000 former military officers, government workers and supporters of the former government of South Vietnam. Other estimates put the number of inmates who passed through "re-education" as high as 500,000 to 1 million. The high end estimate of 1 million is often attributed to a mistranslated statement by Prime Minister Pham Van Dong, and is considered excessive by many scholars.

"Re-education" as it was implemented in Vietnam was seen as both a means of revenge and as a sophisticated technique of repression and indoctrination. Torture was common in the re-education camps. Prisoners were incarcerated for periods ranging from weeks to up to 18 years.

== Historical background ==
In South Vietnam, the government of Ngo Dinh Diem countered North Vietnamese subversion (including the assassination of over 450 South Vietnamese officials by Viet Cong in 1956) by detaining tens of thousands of suspected communists in "political re-education centers." Although it was somewhat successful at curtailing communist activity, Diem's re-education centers were a ruthless program that incarcerated many non-communists. The North Vietnamese government claimed that over 65,000 individuals were incarcerated and 2,148 individuals were killed in the process by November 1957

After the fall of Saigon on April 30, 1975, hundreds of thousands of South Vietnamese men, from former officers in the armed forces, to religious leaders, to employees of the Americans or the old government, were rounded up in re-education camps to "learn about the ways of the new government." They were never tried, judged or convicted of any crime. Many South Vietnamese men chose to flee on boats, but others did not flee. After hearing President Dương Văn Minh surrendered, some ARVN generals and officers, such as General Lê Văn Hưng (known for the Battle of An Lộc) and General Nguyễn Khoa Nam (the last major general of IV Corps who defended Can Tho and other Mekong provinces), chose to commit suicide rather than fleeing overseas or risk being sent to a re-education camp.

Those imprisoned in re-education camps from 1975 basically fell into two categories: those who collaborated with the Americans and its allies during the war, and those who were arrested in the years after 1975 for attempting to exercise such democratic freedoms as those mentioned in Article 11 of the 1973 Paris Agreements. (Possibly in violation of said agreements.)

== Government view ==
Officially, the Vietnamese government does not consider the re-education camps to be prisons; instead it views them as places where individuals can be rehabilitated into society through education and socially constructive labor.

The Hanoi government defended re-education camps by labeling the prisoners as war criminals. A 1981 memorandum of the government to Amnesty International claimed that all those in the re-education camps were guilty of acts of national treason as defined in Article 3 of the 30 October 1967 Law on Counter-revolutionary Crimes (enacted for the government of North Vietnam), which specifies punishments ranging from 20 years to life in prison or the death penalty. However, it was instead allowing the prisoners to experience "re-education", which Vietnam says is the most "humanitarian" form of punishment for law breakers.

== Registration and arrest ==
In May 1975, specific groups of Vietnamese were ordered to register with the new government that had established control over the South on April 30, 1975. Then, in June, the new government issued orders instructing those who had registered in May to report to various places for re-education. Soldiers, noncommissioned officers and rank-and-file personnel of the former South Vietnamese government were to undergo a three-day "reform study," which they would attend during the day and they would go home at night.

Officers of the Army of the Republic of Vietnam (ARVN) forces from the rank of second lieutenant to captain, along with low-ranking police officers and intelligence cadres, were ordered to report to various sites, bringing along "enough paper, pens, clothes, mosquito nets, personal effects, food or money to last ten days beginning from the day of their arrival." Similar instructions were given to former high ranking officials in the South Vietnamese government, except that they were to bring provisions for 30 days.

The new government announced that there would be three days of re-education for ARVN soldiers, ten days for low-ranking officers and officials, and one month for high-ranking ARVN officers and officials. Many teachers reported for re-education, assuming that they would have to undergo it sooner or later anyway. Sick people also reported for re-education, assured by the government that there would be doctors and medical facilities in the schools and that the patients would be well treated. However, the re-education camp lasted sometimes more than 10 years for some higher rank ARVN generals and officers.

== Camps ==
=== Indoctrination and forced confessions ===
During the early phase of re-education, lasting from a few weeks to a few months, inmates were subjected to intensive political indoctrination in areas including the exploitation by American imperialism of workers in other countries, the glory of labor, the inevitable victory of Vietnam, led by the Communist Party, over the U.S., and the generosity of the new government toward the "rebels" (those who fought on the other side during the war). Another feature emphasized during the early stage of re-education, but continued throughout one's imprisonment, was the confession of one's alleged misdeeds in the past. All prisoners in the camps were required to write confessions, no matter how trivial their alleged crimes might have been. Some former ARVN generals, now held prisoner, wrote confessions about several battle and military campaign tactics before 1975. Mail clerks, for example, were told that they were guilty of aiding the "puppet war machinery" through circulating the mail, while religious chaplains were found guilty of providing spiritual comfort and encouragement to enemy troops.

=== Labor ===
In the re-education camps much emphasis was placed on "productive labor." Such labor was described by SRV spokesman Hoang Son as "absolutely necessary" for re-education because "under the former government, they (the prisoners) represented the upper strata of society and got rich under U.S. patronage. They could scorn the working people. Now the former social order has been turned upside down, and after they have finished their stay in camps they have to earn their living by their own labour and live in a society where work is held in honor."

The labor was mostly hard physical work, some of it very dangerous, such as mine field sweeping. No technical equipment was provided for this work, and as a result, many prisoners were killed or wounded in mine field explosions. Other work included cutting trees, planting corn and root crops, clearing the jungle, digging wells, latrines and garbage pits, and constructing barracks within the camp and fences around it. The inmates were generally organized into platoons and work units, where they competed with each other for better records and work achievements. This often pushed inmates to exhaustion and nervousness with each person and group striving to surpass or at least fulfill the norms set by camp authorities, or they would be classified as 'lazy' and ordered to do 'compensation work' on Sundays. Sometimes prisoners who missed their quota were shackled, brutally beaten by camp guards and placed in solitary confinement cells.

Deaths from starvation and disease occurred frequently and bodies were often buried in graves on site which were later abandoned. The work was done in the hot tropical sun, by prisoners who were poorly nourished and received little or no medical care. The poor health, combined with hard work, mandatory confessions and political indoctrination, made life very difficult and contributed to a high death rate. Former prisoners have described the constant hunger that resulted from a lack of food while they were in the camps. The lack of food caused severe malnutrition for some prisoners and weakened their resistance to various diseases. Most common among the diseases were malaria, beriberi and dysentery. Tuberculosis was also widespread in some of the camps.

=== Rules and regulations ===
The camps sought to maintain strict control over the thoughts of the prisoners, and forbade prisoners from keeping and reading books or magazines of the former government, reminiscing in conversation about "imperialism and the puppet south," singing old patriotic songs about the former government, discussing political questions (outside of authorized discussions), and harboring "reactionary" thoughts or having "superstitious" beliefs.

It was acknowledged by Hanoi that violence was in fact directed against prisoners, although it maintained that these were isolated cases and not indicative of general camp policy. Former prisoners, on the other hand, reported frequent beatings for minor infractions, such as missing work because of illness. Violations of rules led to various forms of punishment, including being tied up in contorted positions, shackled in conex boxes or dark cells, forced to work extra hours or receiving reduced food rations. Many prisoners were beaten, some to death, or subjected to very harsh forms of punishment due to the cruelty of certain camp officials and guards. Some were executed, especially for attempting to escape. It was also forbidden to be impolite to the cadres of the camp and sometimes prisoners were harshly punished for breaking this rule. (Note: "...hundreds of thousands more [inmates] bore the permanent physical and psychological scars that would hound them the rest of their lives.")

Longtime anti-Vietnam war and human rights activist Ginetta Sagan described conditions in the camps in 1982:

During the last three years friends and I have interviewed several hundred former prisoners, read newspaper articles on the camps as well as various reports of Amnesty International, and have studied official statements from the Vietnamese Government and its press on the re-education camps. The picture that emerges is one of severe hardship, where prisoners are kept on a starvation diet, overworked and harshly punished for minor infractions of camp rules. We know of cases where prisoners have been beaten to death, confined to dark cells or in ditches dug around the perimeters of the camps and executed for attempting escape. A common form of punishment is confinement to the CONEX boxes—air-freight containers that were left behind by the United States in 1975. The boxes vary in size; some are made of wood and others of metal. In a CONEX box 4 feet high and 4 feet wide, for example, several prisoners would be confined with their feet shackled, and allowed only one bowl of rice and water a day. "It reminded me of the pictures I saw of Nazi camp inmates after World War II," said a physician we interviewed who witnessed the release of four prisoners who had been confined to a CONEX box for one month. None of them survived."

=== Visitation ===
By 1980, official regulations stated that prisoners in the camps could be visited by their immediate family once every three months. Family visits not only meant personal contact, but also it meant they could bring food to their relatives. Some reports have stated that the prisoners in these camps would not have survived without such food. The duration of these visits was reported (by former prisoners) to last from 15 to 30 minutes. Family visits could be suspended for prisoners who broke rules. Only families who proved their loyalty to the government were allowed visiting privileges. Many former prisoners who were interviewed said they had been in three to five different re-education camps. It is believed that the movement of prisoners from one camp to another was intended to prevent their relatives from knowing a specific camp's real location.

== Release of prisoners ==
In June 1976, the Provisional Revolutionary Government of South Vietnam, in one of its last policy announcements before the official reunification of Vietnam, stated that those in the camps would either be tried or released after three years of imprisonment, but this statement was not honored. The policy announced that those still in the camps would stay there for an additional three more years, but they would be released early if they made "real progress, confess their crimes and score merits".

Since there were no clear criteria for releasing the inmates from the camps, bribery and family connections with high-ranking officials were more likely to speed up release than the prisoner's good behavior. Released prisoners were put on probation and placed under surveillance for six months to one year. During that time they had no official status, no exit visas, no access to government food rations, and no right to send their children to school. If the progress of the former prisoners was judged unsatisfactory during this period, they could lose their jobs, be put under surveillance, or be sent back to the camps. Faced with these challenges, many chose to flee the country and became boat people.

The U.S. government considered re-education camp inmates to be political prisoners. In 1989, the Reagan administration entered into an agreement with the Vietnamese government, pursuant to which Vietnam would free many former South Vietnamese officials still held in re-education camps.

The Vietnamese American Foundation began a program called "The Returning Casualty" in early 2006. It attempts to locate the graves of people who died in the camps, identify their remains and deliver them to their loved ones.

== Partial list of camps ==
- Lang Da, NW of Hanoi
- Hỏa Lò Prison in Hanoi, reported by former prisoner Nguyễn Chí Thiện
- Lăng Cô, Thừa Thiên–Huế
- Unnamed temporary camp, Phu Yen Province
- Cà Mau Prison Camp, Tan Anh Camp, Kien Vang Camp, Bạc Liêu Prison Camp, Ganh-Hao Labour Camp, Chi-Lang Camp, Vuon-Dao Camp. Xuyen-Moc Camp

== See also ==
- Samchung re-education camp
- Xinjiang re-education camps
- Gulag, Soviet Union
- The Vietnamese Gulag
- Laogai (Chinese, "reform through labour")
- Mass killings under communist regimes
- Re-education through labor
- Camp 22, North Korea
- New Economic Zones program
