= Mayuka Thaïs =

American singer-songwriter

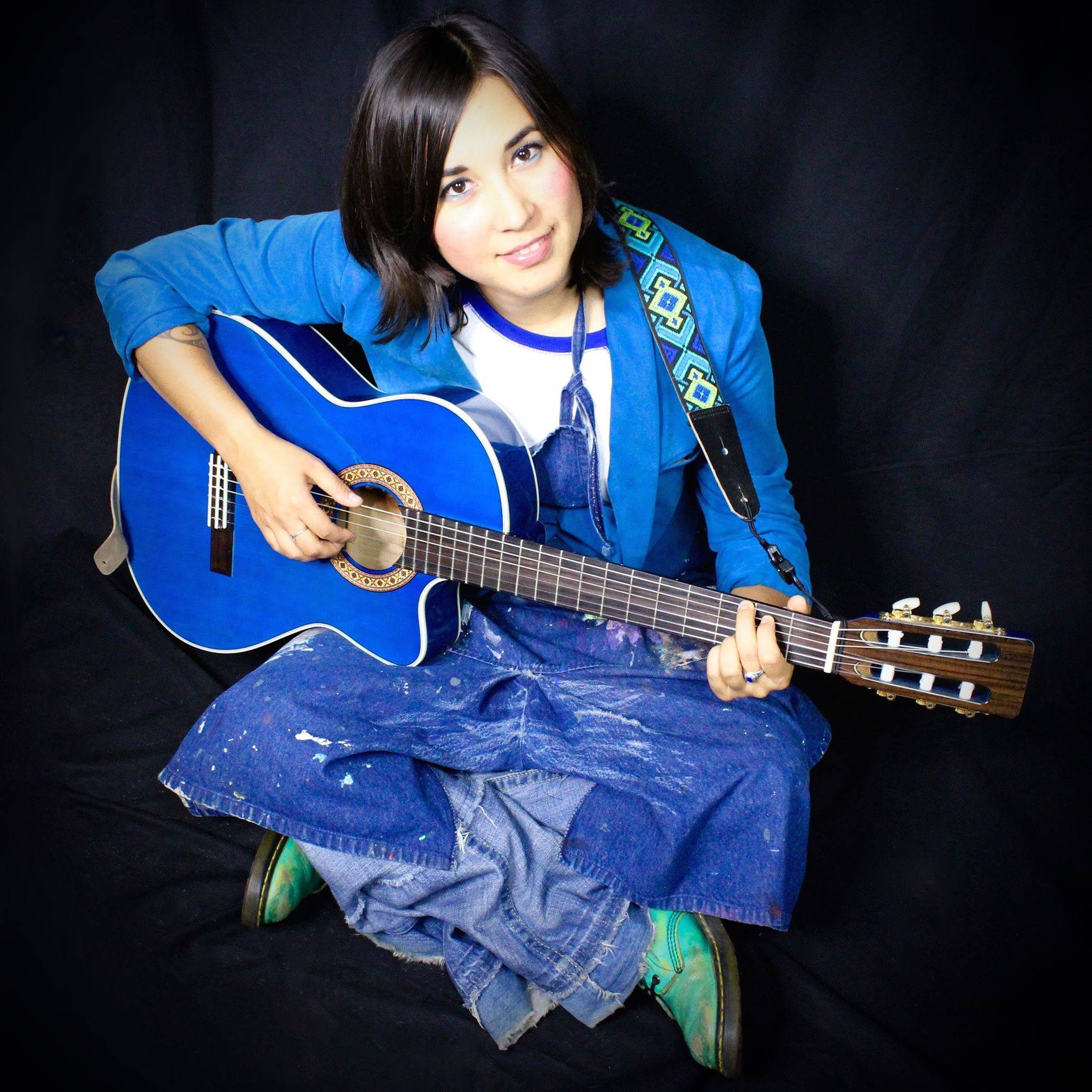
- Tusks & Horns Tour 2015 Image

Background information
- Born: September 25, 1979 (age 46); San Francisco, United States
- Origin: San Francisco, United States
- Genres: Folk; Children's Music; Pop
- Occupations: Singer-songwriter musician artist art educator voice over artist edutainer
- Instruments: Guitar; Vocals; Harmonica
- Years active: 1985–present
- Website: mayukathais.com

Mayuka Thaïs (born September 25, 1979) is an American singer-songwriter, artist, voice over artist, art educator, and edutainer. She is known for her role as a bilingual singer and actress on the popular children's program Shimajiro.

== Early life and career beginnings ==
Thaïs was born in San Francisco to an American mother, Teri Suzanne, from Monrovia and a Japanese father. Her parents met while her mother was studying abroad in Japan. She worked in the edutainment industry in Japan, as a studio singer, actress, and voice over artist, for bilingual multi-media edutainment products from the age of 5 for Nippon Columbia. For 13 years she honed her acting skills while studying at Aoyama Theatre in the round, bilingual Performing Arts Group, at the National Children's Castle's Aoyama Theatre. At the age of 10, Thaïs won the Tokyo Metropolitan Government art award. Her notable role came when she became the main singer, actress on a popular children's program Shimajiro In 2007, Thaïs graduated and received her BFA from Otis College of Art and Design in Los Angeles with HONORS majoring in Fine Arts Painting and A.C.T. (Artists, Community, & Teaching). Thaïs is currently a senior lecturer at Otis College of Art and Design.

== Music ==
At the age of 5, Thaïs recorded a Christmas album Minna De Merry Christmas with multiracial children for Nippon Columbia. To date, Thais has worked on 14 albums and countless singles. In 2004 Thaïs recorded Genki Genki Utaou Nontan's bilingual Christmas album for Nippon Columbia along with her sister Kunimi Andrea, and her mother Teri Suzanne. With the help of contributors on her Pledge Music campaign, her album Tusks & Horns was produced by Geoff Levin of People! in May 2014. Thaïs has shared the stage with artists such as Mayu Wakisaka, The Watanabes, Nesian Mystik, and Geoff Levin. Thaïs's song "Song Without You" is featured in the film "Half Way to Hell" directed by Richard Friedman.

== Art ==
At the age of 10, Thaïs won the Tokyo Metropolitan Government art award. In 2007, Thaïs's painting of a life-size Asian Elephant was exhibited at the Palos Verdes Art Center as part of a group show The Circus Comes to Town curated by Scott Canty.

== Activism ==
On December 13, 2006, when Thaïs was an art student at Otis College of Art and Design, she took her painting of an elephant in captivity to a town hall meeting to lend her voice to discuss conditions of elephants in captivity. In 2007, Thaïs released her first independent single When Elephants Cry on YouTube to help raise awareness of the plight of Elephants in captivity. She was asked to perform this song at the Comedy Store for a recognition dinner of high-profile celebrities including Jorja Fox, comedian Lily Tomlin and former Los Angeles City Councilman Tony Cardenas and current Congressman. In 2014, she was asked to march for the Global March for Elephants & Rhinos in San Francisco and to sing her song Tusks & Horns at the United Nations Plaza with her producer Geoff Levin on guitar. In 2015, she went on her Tusks & Horns tour and toured Hiroshima, Fukuoka, Kagawa, and Tokyo, Japan. She gave hanga artworkshops for children, art students, and families in hopes of raising and spreading awareness of the plight of endangered Elephants & Rhinos. She also joined in the march for the Global March for Elephants & Rhinos in Tokyo.

== Peace song for Hiroshima ==
In August 2015, Thaïs performed her song Yamayuri no Kimochi for the 70th war memorial in Hiroshima at the Akioota International Music festival. The song was a collaboration between Thaïs for melody, lyrics by the children of Hiroshima, lyrics made into poetry by poet Arthur Binard, piano by Scott Nagatani. The song has become the official song to commemorate the annual war memorial for the Akioota International Music Festival.

== Art and music non-profit collaborations ==
=== Music ===
To help disadvantaged youth find their own voices, Thaïs worked with the non-profit program Youth Speak Collective students in the San Fernando Valley to cultivate their songwriting skills for Rockband 101. Drummer and percussionist Billy Hawn joined in to help teach, inspire, and arrange music for the students.

=== Art ===
To help raise awareness of the plight of Asian elephants, Thaïs collaborated with a non-profit organization Elemotion, to paint a life-size baby Asian elephant with the students from International School of the Sacred Heart.

== Television ==
In 2016, Thaïs was one of the two finalists on Skin Wars: Fresh Paint episode 2, hosted by RuPaul. A spin-off of the popular TV series Skin Wars specifically for artists who have never body painted before.

=== Television ===
Year	Title	Role	Notes
2016	Skin Wars: Fresh Paint	Contestant	GSNTV

== Children's television and programs personality ==
=== Children's television and programs ===
Year	Title	Role	Notes
2011	Kids Station Utabako	Herself	SKY PerfecTV!
2003–2005	Shimajiro	Mayuka	Benesse
2002	Action 8	Herself	NHK Software
1998	Mrs. Santa's Doki Doki Family	Reindeer	SKY PerfecTV!

== Discography ==
=== Songs for films ===
Year	Film	Role	Directed by	Song
2013	Half Way to Hell	Songwriter, performer, writer	Richard Friedman	Song Without You
2014	Liberation	Songwriter, performer, writer	Siglia Diniz	Let the Wind Blow
2014	On Georgia's Mind	Songwriter, performer, writer	Montana Mann	Don't Say Forever

== Albums ==
Independently released:

Title	Artist	Year	Role	Producer	Labels
Tusks & Horns	Mayuka Thaïs	2014	Singer-songwriter, guitarist	Geoff Levin	Independent

Studio released:

Title	Year	Role	Labels
Minna De Merry Christmas	1988	Singer	Nippon Columbia
The Adventures of Shiny & Sparkle	1989	Singer	ALC
Ninjin Cha Cha Cha	1993	Singer	Nippon Columbia
Ahiru No Samba	1994	Singer	Nippon Columbia
Mrs. Santa's Series: Thanks Santa!	1995	Singer	Nippon Columbia
All We Need	1998	Singer-songwriter, performer	Nippon Columbia
Doki Doki Family	1999	Singer	Meito
Teri's Happy Animals	2000	Singer	Nippon Columbia, Meito
Mama to Asobou: Eigo no Asobi uta	2000	Singer	Nippon Columbia, Akachan Honpo
Bring Santa To Me	2001	Singer	Dream Illumination
Action 8	2002	Singer	NHK software
Genki Genki Nontan Utaou! Christmas	2004	Singer	Nippon Columbia
Play Time for Toddlers	2005	Singer	Benesse
Let's Play with Alphabets	2009	Singer	Nippon Columbia
Let's Sing English Songs Together	2012	Singer	Nippon Columbia
Toku Toku Eigo no Uta 50 songs	2013	Singer	Nippon Columbia
Maniatta! Series (6) Christmas & New Years	2013	Singer	Nippon Columbia
Columbia Kids! Hop! Step! Jump! Eigo no Uta Tsume Awase	2015	Singer	Nippon Columbia
Santa to Utaou Christmas	2016	Singer	Nippon Columbia
Eigo no Uta	2017	Singer	Nippon Columbia
Christmas Song	2018	Singer	Nippon Columbia
Christmas Songs Best of Best	2019	Singer	Nippon Columbia
Let's Enjoy Christmas	2020	Singer	Nippon Columbia
ABC Utatte Minitsuku Eigo	2022	Singer	Nippon Columbia

== Singles ==
Singles released independently:

- Thanks Santa (1995)
- The Divine (2004)
- When Elephants Cry (2010)
- Hope Is My Friend (2011)
- All We Gotta Give (2011)
- The Great Serengeti (2011)
- Tohorā He Waiata (The Whale Song) (2012)
- Hearts Don't Lie (2013)
- Let the Wind Blow (2014)
- Yamayuri no Kimochi (2015)
- I Will Sing For You (2020)
- The Yamayuri Song (2020)
- Just One More Time (2020)

Released Nippon Columbia:

- Let's Play with Alphabets (2009)
- Sounds of Animals (2009)
- Kaze no Youni (1993)

== Music videos ==
- Just One More Time (2020)
- I Will Sing For You (2020)
- Yamayuri No Kimochi (2016)
- Let the Wind Blow (2015)
- I Needed You ((ft.Connor Sullivan)) (2014)
- Tusks & Horns (2014)
- Hearts Don't Lie ((ft. Ambient Chameleon)) (2013)
- Hope is My Friend (2012)
- The Great Serengeti (2011)
- All We Gotta Give (2011)
- All Alone at Christmas (2011)
- When Elephants Cry (2007)

== Awards ==
=== Art ===
Year	Award	Category	Work	Result
1989	Tokyo Metropolitan Government Art Award	Artwork	The Garbage Truck	Won

=== Music ===
Year	Award	Category	Work	Result
2012	Eco Arts Awards	Music Video	All We Gotta Give	Nominated
2013	Eco Arts Awards	Song	Tohorā He Waiata	Nominated

== Video interviews and appearances ==
- "We all Japan No. 10 – Mayuka Thaïs " 2011
- "Mayuka Thaïs Summer Songwriting Workshop for Youth Speak Collective 2011 with Billy Hawn " 2011
- "GLOBAL MARCH FOR ELEPHANTS & RHINOS SF – Musical Medicine with Soleil Dakota " 2014
