= Anthony Zboralski =

French businessperson

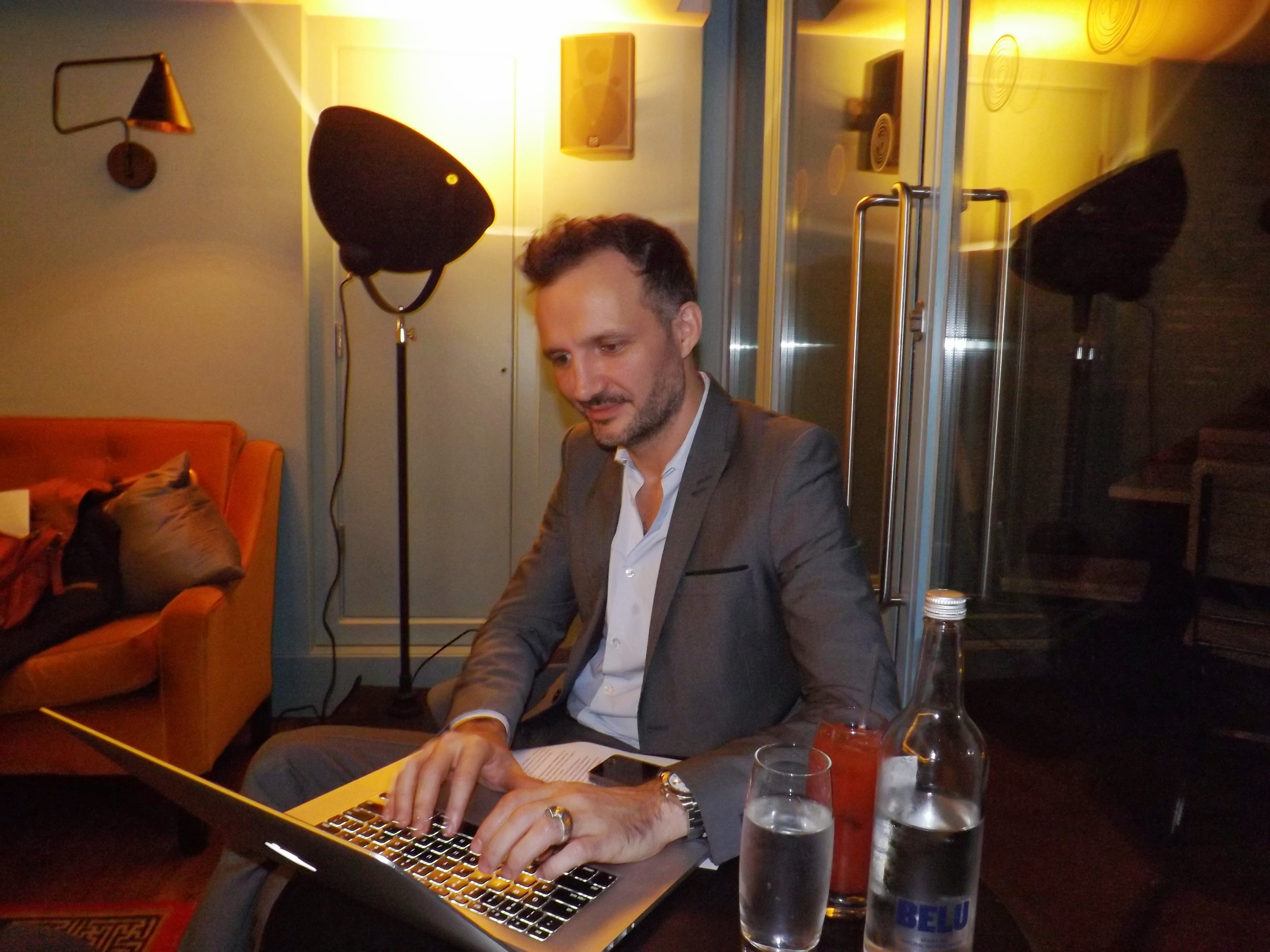
- Born: Martigues, France
- Citizenship: French, British
- Known for: security, attention economy
- Scientific career
- Fields: Computer science
- Website: zboralski.net

Anthony Zboralski is a French hacker, artist and internet entrepreneur.

== Computer hacking ==
In 1994, Zboralski social engineered the FBI to connect to the internet and set up teleconferences with other hackers. Over a period of four months, Zboralski posed as its legal attaché in Paris, Thomas Baker, costing the FBI $250,000.

Zboralski was part of a group of hackers called w00w00. He went by the handles "gaius" and "kugutsumen".

== Career ==
From 2011 to 2013, Zboralski worked as a managing consultant for IOActive. In 2014, Zboralski co-founded Belua Systems Limited.

=== Television ===
Surfez Couvert was a TV show co-written by Antoine Rivière and Zboralski in which Zboralski offered practical recommendations on how to protect our "life 2.0". It began airing on Game One in 2013 and was co-produced by Flair Production and MTV Networks France.

== See also ==
- Gameplay_of_Eve_Online#Developer_misconduct
- Parmiter's School
