= Servio =

Technology company based in San Francisco, California, United States

Servio is a San Francisco based technology company that provides enterprise content services. It was founded by Alex Edelstein and Jordan Ritter in 2009, and originally called CloudCrowd. The CloudCrowd brand continues to be used by the company as its online workspace. and uses crowdsourcing concepts. Servio was acquired by CrowdSource in December 2013.

== Products ==
=== Content Creation ===
Servio creates unique content, including retail product descriptions, health content, and articles.

=== Content & Page Optimization ===
Servio carries out at-scale optimization of existing content, including rewriting, title tag creation, keyword research, interlinking, and image location.

== Customers ==
Customers include Target, eBay, Healthline, Walmart, and Coca-Cola.

== People ==
Servio was founded by Alex Edelstein and Jordan Ritter.
