= Teri Suzanne =

American actress

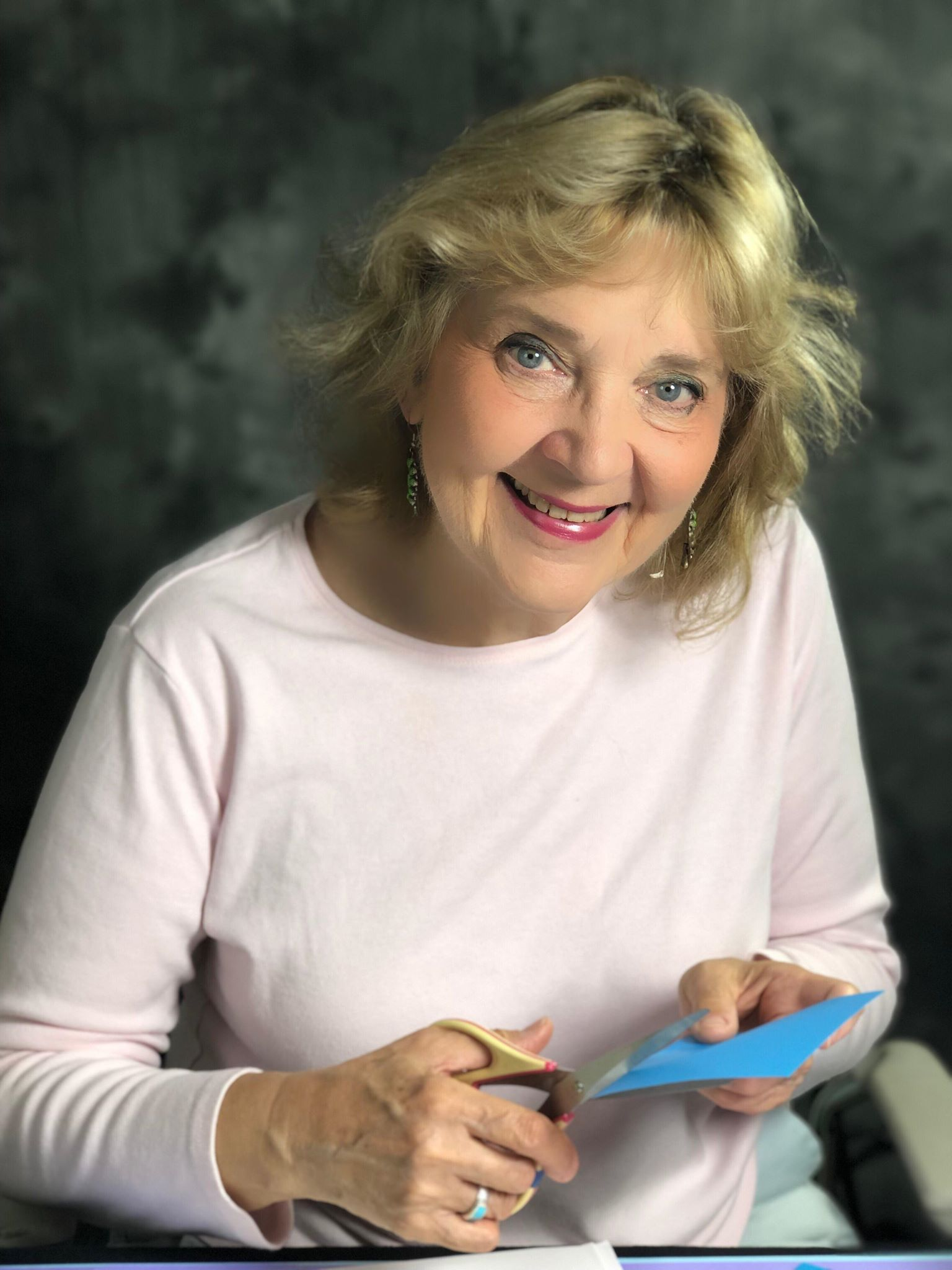
- Suzanne cutting in 2019
- Born: August 18, 1948 (age 77); Globe, Arizona, United States
- Education: University of California, Los Angeles, University of San Francisco, United States
- Children: Kunimi Andrea and Mayuka Thaïs
- Website: tericuts.com

Teri Suzanne (born August 18, 1948) is an American bilingual actress, freehand cut paper artist, author, children's songwriter, and creator of the first bilingual family theatre program and theatre group Performing Arts Group (P.A.G) at the Aoyama Theatre in Japan. She is also a producer of English and bilingual multi-media edutainment products, and edutainer with music labels and companies such as Nippon Columbia, Polygon Records, Crayola, Benesse, and SONY Suzanne is known for her television series English in Action produced through NHKsoftware for the Ministry of Science and Education. She was Head of the International Department at the National Children's Castle.

The Tokyo Journal named her as one of 50 foreigners who have made a difference in Japan.

== Life and education ==
Suzanne was born in Globe, Arizona. She grew up in Southern California and graduated from the University of California Los Angeles with a degree in graphic design and children's puppetry theatre. She later received her masters of education and bilingual education from the University of San Francisco. She was one of the pioneer students to receive a degree in cross cultural education and bilingual specialist credential in this degree program.

Suzanne has two daughters Kunimi Andrea and Mayuka Thaïs who have worked on many of her multi-media bilingual edutainment projects.

== Career ==
=== Music ===
Suzanne has worked on 13 albums and numerous singles. In 2004 she recorded Genki Genki Utaou Nontan's bilingual Christmas album for Nippon Columbia along with her daughters Kunimi Andrea and Mayuka Thaïs. Other labels she has worked for include ALC Publishing, Meito, Akachan Honpo, NHKsoftware, and Benesse

=== Studio releases ===
Title	Year	Role	Labels
Minna De Merry Christmas	1988	Studio artist director	Nippon Columbia
The Adventures of Shiny & Sparkle	1989	Voice	ALC
Ninjin Cha Cha Cha	1993	Songwriter	Nippon Columbia
Ahiru Samba	1994	Songwriter	Nippon Columbia
Mrs. Santa's Series: Thanks Santa!	1995	Singer, Songwriter	Nippon Columbia
All We Need	1998	Songwriter	Nippon Columbia
Doki Doki Family	1999	Songwriter, Singer	Meito
Teri's Happy Animals	2000	Songwriter, Singer	Nippon Columbia, Meito
Mama to Asobou: Eigo no Asobi uta	2000	Songwriter	Nippon Columbia, Akachan Honpo
Bring Santa To Me	2001	Songwriter	Dream Illumination
Action 8	2002	Studio artist director	NHK software
Genki Genki Nontan Utaou! Christmas	2004	Voice	Nippon Columbia
Play Time for Toddlers	2005	Songwriter	Benesse

=== Television ===
Suzanne has been a TV personality for NHKsoftware, NHK, KBS TV, NHK Educational, and SKY PerfecTV!

Year	Title	Role	Notes
2002	Action 8	Director	NHKsoftware
1995–2000	Children’s View	Narrator	NHK
1997–2008	Takamatsu Dream Illumination	Mrs. Santa	KBS TV
1999	Hajimeyo Eikaiwa		NHK Educational
1998	Mrs. Santa's Doki Doki Family	Mrs. Santa	SKY PerfecTV!

== Bilingual theatre ==
Suzanne founded the first multi-cultural bilingual group called the Performing Arts Group (P.A.G.) to perform the first bilingual family theatre and family disco productions founded in 1985 in Tokyo, Japan. Their performance and productions were at the Aoyama Theatre in Tokyo, Japan. In the span of 13 years the company produced over 150 shows.

== Takashimaya floor design ==
Suzanne designed Nihonbashi Takashimaya Department store's children's floor. Suzanne based the floor design on her original bilingual Chidldren's book The Adventures of Shiny and Sparkle. Suzanne created bilingual floor-theme songs, event spaces, staff uniforms, a family membership program, toilets just for kids, a baby snack area, babysitting service and an infant changing and nursing area.

== Books ==
- Shiny & Sparkle's Adventure (1989), a bilingual children's book with cassette
- Choki Choki Kids (1998), Iwasaki Shoten, scissor art book
- Katachi wa HAPPY! (1998)
- Party! Party! (1998), Iwasaki Publishing
