= The Vietnamese Gulag =

Autobiography by Doan Van Toai

Le Goulag Vietnamien (First edition)
- First edition
- Author: Doan Van Toai, as told to Michel Voirol
- Language: French
- Genre: Autobiography
- Published: 1979
- Publisher: Paris : R. Laffont
- Publication place: France
- Media type: Print
- Pages: 341 p.
- ISBN: 2-221-00385-3
- OCLC: 476545048

The Vietnamese Gulag (First English translation)
- Author: Doan Van Toai, David Chanoff
- Original title: Le Goulag Vietnamien
- Translator: Sylvie Romanowski and Françoise Simon-Miller.
- Language: tr. from French
- Publisher: Simon & Schuster
- Publication date: tr. from 1979
- Publication place: tr. from France
- English publication date: 1986
- Media type: Print
- Pages: 351 p.
- ISBN: 0-671-60350-7
- OCLC: 12840146

The Vietnamese Gulag is the autobiography of the Vietnamese pro-democracy activist Doan Van Toai. The book focuses specifically on his arrest and imprisonment by the Communist Vietnamese government, events which precipitated a change in his political belief from lukewarm communist to advocate of democracy.

Writing in The New York Times, Robert Shaplan said that the book "is reminiscent, at its best, of E. E. Cummings's Enormous Room and Arthur Koestler's Darkness at Noon." Shaplan also notes that the book's "value derives from [the author] having been one of the first Vietnamese to write effectively of his experience, and to describe what he calls 'the method of the betrayal' of his revolutionary hopes and ideals." John P Roche, who reviewed the book for the Los Angeles Times, called the narrative "moving" and "written with a striking lack of self-pity".

The Vietnamese Gulag was originally written in French (Le Goulag Vietnamien) and published in 1979. A German translation followed in 1980. The English translation was published in 1986 and generally met with critical approval.

== See also ==
- Cursed Days
- The Gulag Archipelago
