= Nippon Columbia =

Japanese record label

Nippon Columbia Co., Ltd.
- Native name: 日本コロムビア株式会社
- Romanized name: Nippon Koromubia Kabushiki-gaisha
- Formerly: Nipponophone Co., Ltd. (1910-1946); Nippon Columbia Co., Ltd. (1946-2002); Columbia Music Entertainment, Inc. (2002-2010)
- Type: Subsidiary
- Traded as: TYO: 6791
- Industry: Japanese music
- Founded: October 10, 1910; 116 years ago
- Founder: Fredrick W. Horn
- Headquarters: Jingūmae, Shibuya, Tokyo, Japan
- Key people: Yoshitaka Domon (president)
- Owner: Hitachi (majority stake, 1969-2001); Ripplewood Holdings (majority stake, 2001-2010); Faith, Inc. (2010-present)
- Subsidiaries: Columbia Songs; Columbia Marketing
- Website: columbia.jp/company/en/

The former Columbia Music Entertainment logo used from 2002 to 2010.

Nippon Columbia Co., Ltd. (Japanese: 日本コロムビア株式会社, Hepburn: Nippon Koromubia Kabushiki-faisha), often pronounced Korombia, operating internationally as Nipponophone, is a Japanese record label founded in 1910 as Nipponophone Co., Ltd. It affiliated itself with the Columbia Graphophone Company of the United Kingdom and adopted the standard UK Columbia trademarks (the "Magic Notes") in 1931. The company changed its name to Nippon Columbia Co., Ltd. in 1946. It used the Nippon Columbia name until October 1, 2002, when it became Columbia Music Entertainment, Inc. (コロムビアミュージックエンタテインメント株式会社, Koromubia Myūjikku Entateinmento Kabushiki kaisha). On October 1, 2010, the company returned to its current name. Outside Japan, the company operated formerly as the Savoy Label Group, which releases recordings on the SLG, Savoy Jazz, and continues to operate as Denon. It also manufactured electronic products under the Denon brand name until 2001. In 2017, Concord Music acquired Savoy Label Group. Nippon Columbia also licensed Hanna-Barbera properties for consumer products in Japan until those rights were transferred to Turner Home Entertainment sometime in 1997. Currently, these rights are owned by Warner Bros. Japan LLC.

== Other information ==
Aside from common historical roots, the current Nippon Columbia label has no direct relation with either the American Columbia Records (part of the Sony Music group in the United States and known in Japan as Sony Records International; Nippon Columbia was the licensee for the American Columbia Records up until 1968, when CBS/Sony (now Sony Music) was founded) or the British EMI group, of which the original Columbia Graphophone Co. was a part - the licensee for the British Columbia Graphophone Company was actually Toshiba Musical Industries (The EMI group was broken up in 2012; the current licensee for re-issues is Universal Music Japan). The label is notable, however, for continuing to use the historical Magic Notes logo, which has been associated with the Columbia name since the label's founding.

In addition to music, Nippon Columbia also develops and publishes video games.

== Artists ==
Japanese People's Honour Award-winning singer Hibari Misora belonged to the label. This label is also known for dropping Ayumi Hamasaki, the best-selling solo artist in Japanese Oricon history (since 1968), before her rise to fame. It happened after her first single "Nothing from Nothing" and album of the same name flopped, due to little or no promotion. She subsequently met her current producer, Max Matsuura, who is now President of Avex.

Also included in the roster:

- Ichirō Fujiyama
- Masao Koga
- Tadaharu Nakano
- Shizuko Kasagi
- Akiko Futaba
- Hisao Itō
- Noboru Kirishima
- Godiego
- MADKID
- ONEPIXCEL
- Kiyoshi Hikawa
- Kaela Kimura
- Ulrik Munther (Japan only)
- not yet
- Yoshiki
- Laboum
- ATEEZ
- Mayuka Thaïs
- Kunimi Andrea
- Teri Suzanne
- Lovely Summer Chan

== Labels ==
- Animex
- B-C (pronounced B to C)
- CME Records
- Columbia House
- Columbia International
- Columbia Japan
- Columbia*readymade (originally stylized as ********* records, tokyo and/or readymade records, tokyo on CD artwork, later changing to columbia*readymade after Nippon Columbia rebranded to Columbia Music Entertainment)
- Columbia Records (unrelated to the USA-based label, which is under Sony Music)
- Denon
- Forte Music Entertainment (stylized as Forte Music E.)
- Heat Wave
- Hug Columbia
- M-Train
- Nexstar Records
- Passion
- Triad

== OtoRevo ==
In February 2006 Columbia Music Entertainment CEO Sadahiko Hirose hired Napster co-founder Jordan Ritter as executive advisor to the CEO. In April 2006, Ritter became CTO and formed the Red Dove (R&D) division, focusing on reducing costs and improving efficiency of internal operations, while developing new spinout companies that proved better approaches to the most expensive aspects of CME's business.

In 2007, Ritter hired Ejovi Nuwere into CME, and together they began building a Japanese-based, competition-oriented promotional platform for new artists called OtoRevo. The premise of the project was to prove a more cost- and time-efficient model for discovering viable artists to join the label. Despite the measurable successes of Otorevo, the CME board of directors voted to terminate all R&D projects in March 2008.

=== OtoRevo Artists ===
A number of talented artists were discovered on the OtoRevo platform. Two artist received debuts but all were released after the shut down of the R&D division and went to other labels. The most well known is the group CREAM who were originally named IYSE. They are currently one of the top selling new artists in Japan with more than 3M channel views on YouTube.

== Major investors ==
Major investors included Faith Inc. (31.20%), Daiichi Kosho Company (4.75%), Japan Securities Finance Co., Ltd. (2.13%), Sumitomo Trust and Banking (0.95%), Nomura Securities (0.75%), Rakuten Securities (0.64%) and Fukoku Mutual Life Insurance Company (0.59%).

In 2017, Faith Inc. acquired the rest of Nippon Columbia stocks, making it a wholly owned subsidiary.

== See also ==
- List of record labels
