= Silvio Cesare =

Australian security researcher

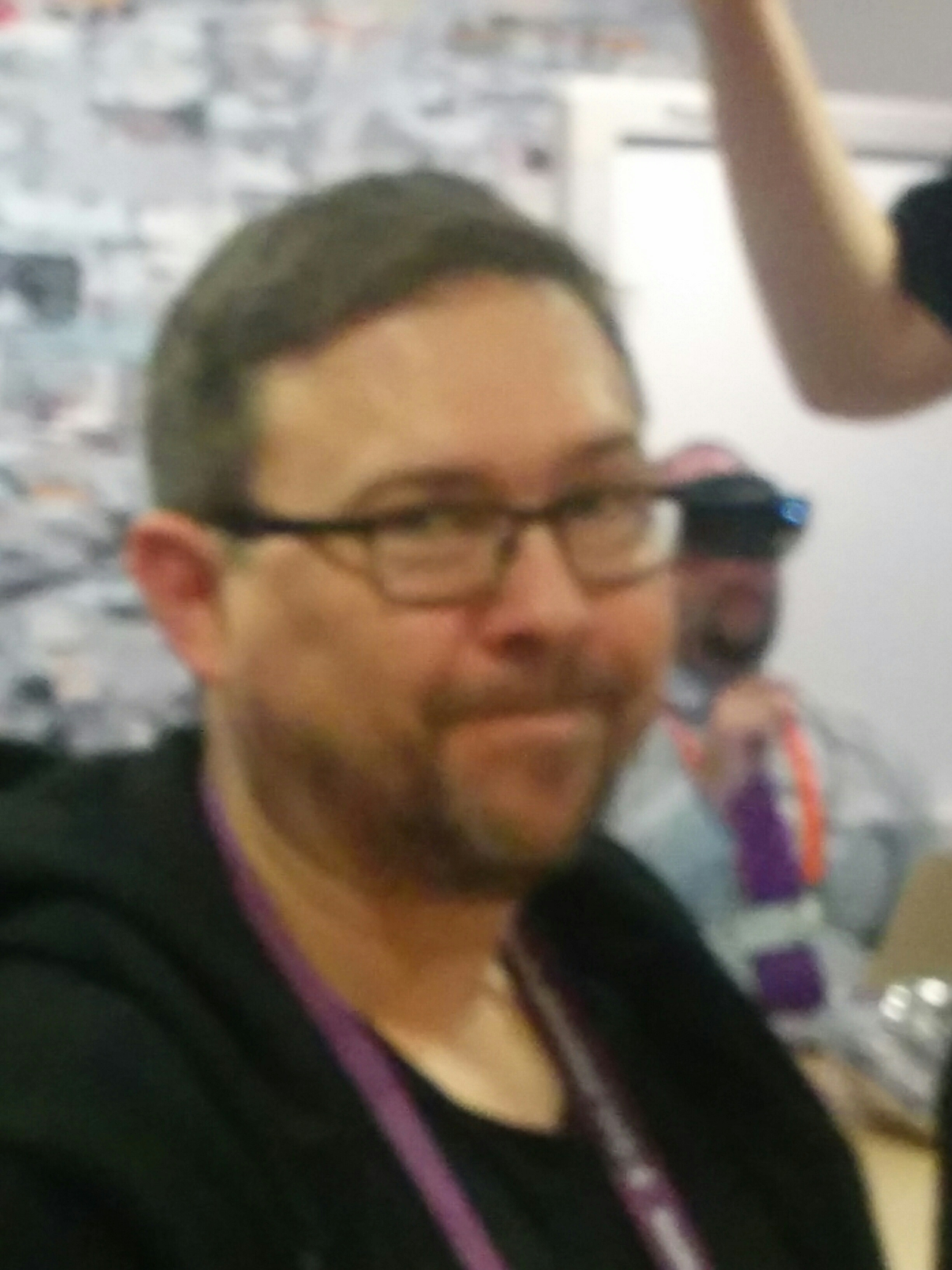
- Born: Sydney, New South Wales, Australia
- Occupations: Security researcher, conference organizer, unlicensed Forklift operator
- Years active: 1993–present

Silvio Cesare (/tʃɛˈzæreɪ/ chez-ARR-ay) is an Australian security researcher known for his multiple articles in phrack, talks at numerous security conferences including Defcon and Black Hat Briefings. Silvio is also a former member of w00w00. His security research includes an IDS evasion bug in the widely deployed Snort software. Silvio holds a PhD in Computer Science from Deakin University and is the co-founder of the security conference BSides Canberra. He earned his Master of Informatics and Bachelor of Information Technology from CQUniversity Australia. He currently operates the Canberra based training and consulting provider InfoSect.

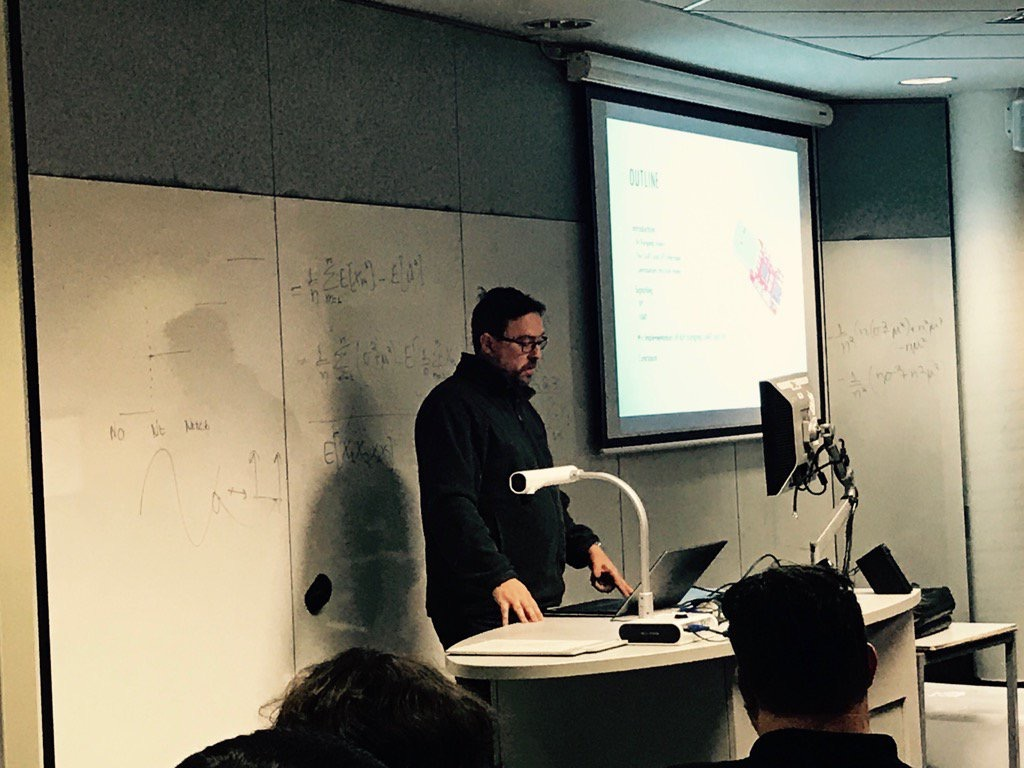

== Articles ==
Silvio is the author of "Software Similarity and Classification", released by Springer.

He is the author of numerous whitepapers on information security, including:

- Share Library Call Redirection Via ELF PLT Infection - Phrack
- Similarities for Fun and Profit - Phrack
- Fast Automated Unpacking and Classification of Malware

== Software and Services ==
Silvio has released numerous tools to perform software similarity classification.

=== Simseer ===
Simseer is a free online service that tells you how similar to each other are the software that you give it. It is built using the technology of Malwise. There are a number of applications where it is useful to know if software is similar, such as malware classification, incident response, plagiarism detection, and software theft detection.

=== Bugwise ===
Bugwise is a service that performs bug detection in Linux executable binaries. It does this by using static program analysis. More specifically, it is performed using decompilation and data flow analysis. Currently, the service checks for the presence of some double frees in sequential code that use the libc allocator functions.

=== Clonewise ===
Clonewise is an open source project to identify clones of packages embedded in other software source. Identifying package clones enables us to automatically infer outstanding vulnerabilities from out-of-date clones.
