= Performing Arts Group =

Performing Arts Group (P.A.G)
- Founded: 1985
- Founder: Teri Suzanne
- Defunct: 1998
- Headquarters: Aoyama, Tokyo, Japan
- Website: www.kodomono-shiro.com/english

Performing Arts Group (P.A.G) was the first multi-cultural bilingual group to perform the first bilingual family theatre and family disco productions founded in 1985 by Teri Suzanne in Tokyo, Japan. Their performance and productions were at the Aoyama Theatre in Tokyo, Japan. In the span of 13 years the company produced over 150 shows.

== Notable performers, actors, and directors ==
- Mayuka Thaïs
- Wise (rapper) member of the Teriyaki Boyz
- Kunimi Andrea
- Teri Suzanne
