= The Gramercy =

- Interactive map of the The Gramercy area
- Former names: ManhattanWest

General information
- Type: Apartments and commercial
- Location: West Russell Road, Spring Valley, Nevada, United States
- Coordinates: 36.084095°N 115.293612°W
- Construction started: 2007
- Opened: November 6, 2014
- Owner: Koll Company and Estein USA (commercial buildings); Lyon Living (residential)

Technical details
- Floor count: 4

Design and construction
- Architecture firm: Oz Architecture
- Developer: Gemstone Development (original); Krausz Companies and WGH Partners (Gramercy)
- Main contractor: ManhattanWest: Apco Construction; Camco Pacific Construction; Gramercy: Martin-Harris Construction

Other information
- Number of units: 160

Website
- www.thegramercyvegas.com

The Gramercy is a mixed-use development project in Spring Valley, Nevada, west of the Las Vegas Strip. It includes two office buildings and 160 apartment units. Gemstone Development began construction of the project, originally known as ManhattanWest, in 2007. The project initially was to include condominiums, retail, and office space. Construction was suspended in December 2008, because of financial problems. ManhattanWest was sold in 2013, and construction resumed, with the project now known as The Gramercy. It opened in November 2014. An unfinished nine-story condominium tower was imploded in February 2015, as completing it would have been too costly.

== History ==
=== ManhattanWest ===
In 2006, Gemstone Development completed a 700-unit condominium property called Manhattan, located south of the Las Vegas Strip. That year, the company purchased a 20-acre property in Spring Valley, Nevada (southwest Las Vegas), near the Las Vegas Beltway. The purchase cost $30 million, and was financed by Theraldson Financial Group. As of July 2006, Gemstone was planning to build a condominium project on the newly acquired land, under the name ManhattanWest. Like the earlier project, ManhattanWest would also contain 700 units. They would be housed in a nine-story tower and a series of four-story buildings. The mixed-use development project would also include office and retail space.

ManhattanWest was designed by Denver-based Oz Architecture, while Apco Construction was the general contractor. Developer Alex Edelstein, the chief executive officer of Gemstone, was confident that the project would succeed despite a poor housing market in Las Vegas. Excavation work began on the site in April 2007. Vertical construction of the first phase – three residential buildings and two commercial buildings – was expected to begin in the third quarter of 2007. ManhattanWest was expected to begin opening during the third quarter of 2008, with full completion by mid-2009.

Buildings in the project had Manhattan-inspired names, including Tribeca House and Gramercy House. The flagship nine-story building, known as Element House, would include 73 units, a 70,000 sq ft (6,500 m^{2}) fitness center, and a rooftop deck and lounge with views of the Las Vegas Strip and Red Rock Canyon. The two other residential buildings, as well as the two office buildings, were four stories high. The complex would ultimately consist of 12 buildings, and would include 150,000 sq ft (14,000 m^{2}) of Class A office space, as well as 43,000 sq ft (4,000 m^{2}) of ground-floor retail space. The project would feature approximately 30 retailers and four restaurants.

By November 2007, the project had experienced strong pre-sales, despite the poor market. More than 50 percent of the first phase had sold out within the first six months, making it one of the best-selling condominium projects in the United States. Unit prices on the project had been raised five times up to that point, and construction was proceeding on a continuous schedule to get the first five buildings finished. One aspect of the project that garnered attention from prospective buyers was ManhattanMD, an on-site medical facility for residents. The project was expected to cost $330 million. Construction costs were low at the time because of decreased demand in the housing market. Edelstein remained confident in the project and had invested more than half of his net worth into it.

Element House was topped off in August 2008. At the time, Edelstein had made a preliminary agreement with InterContinental Hotels to open a 120-room Staybridge Suites hotel at ManhattanWest, catering to business travelers. Camco Pacific Construction became the new general contractor in September 2008. Edelstein cited poor construction work by Apco as the reason for the change, and additional money had to be spent on reworking and rebuilding parts of the project that were deemed inadequate. The project had 58 building code violations, including faulty structural concrete and an inadequate fire safety system. At the time of the contractor change, Element House was 80 percent complete, while the Union Square commercial plaza was scheduled for completion later in the year. The first phase was scheduled for full completion around March 2009.

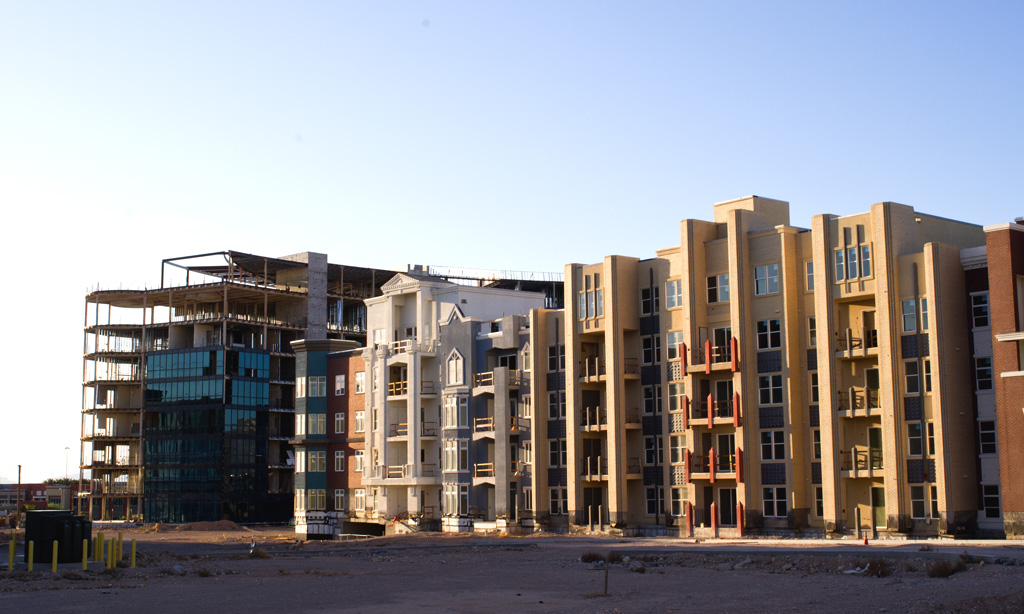
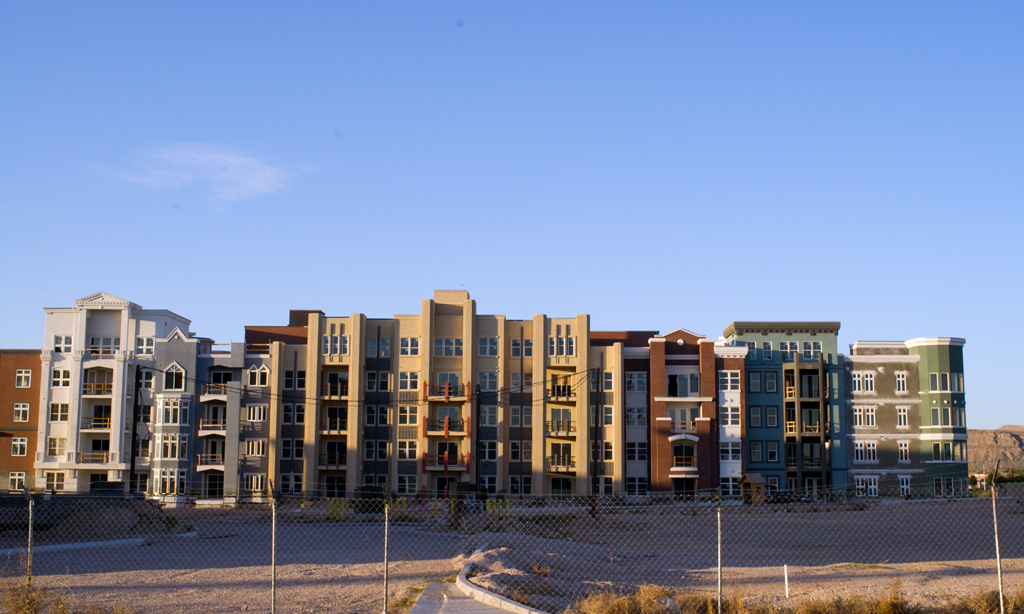
Unfinished residential buildings in 2011

Edelstein announced the suspension of construction on December 16, 2008, as financing was no longer available. The announcement was made during the Great Recession, and Edelstein said a primary reason for the suspension was "a mismatch of what it costs to build one of these things and what people are willing to pay for condos and office space." He also blamed significant cost increases that were necessary to fix the earlier work done by Apco. Edelstein said these increased costs were what led to the lenders terminating the project's financing. He hoped to eventually acquire new financing to finish ManhattanWest.

Edelstein had spent $170 million on the project, which was considered an eyesore in the years after work was suspended. The nine-story tower was vandalized, with glass paneling being smashed, while copper wiring was stolen from the building. More than $30 million in liens were filed against ManhattanWest following the suspension. A legal battle developed, involving the banks that financed the project and construction companies that were owed money for their work. By March 2009, Edelstein had talked with several groups that were interested in purchasing the project, but he said that none of them had any serious offers.

Gemstone filed for bankruptcy in 2011. The H5 Group, founded by Ofir Hagay, was in the process of purchasing the project out of bankruptcy during 2012. Before the purchase could be approved by a bankruptcy judge, a creditor stated that the sale price was too low, prompting an auction in an effort to bring in a higher price. The Calida Group, a Nevada housing developer, was in the process of purchasing the project at the end of 2012.

=== The Gramercy ===
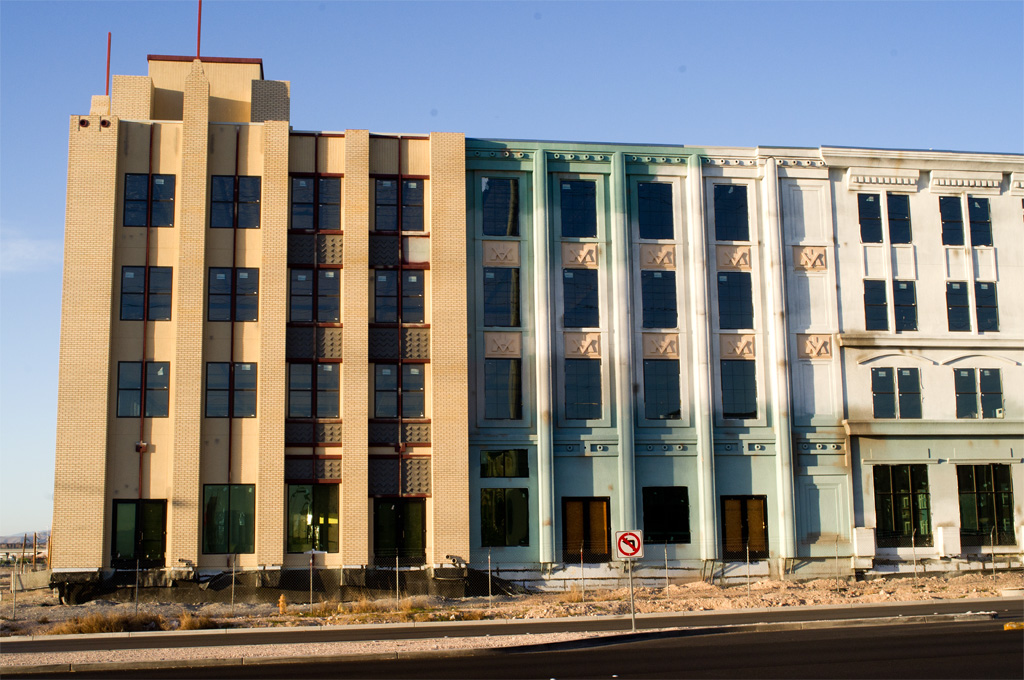
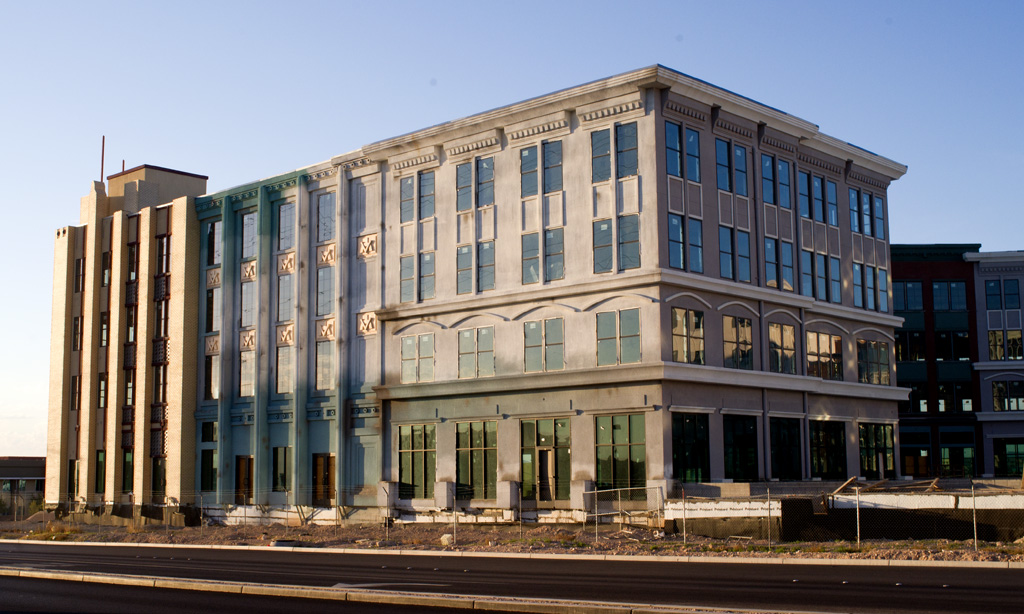
One of the unfinished commercial buildings

Krausz Companies, based in California, ultimately purchased ManhattanWest in June 2013, for $20 million. Krausz teamed up with WGH Partners, based in Las Vegas, to develop the unfinished project. Hagay was among the partners at WGH, which was also a co-owner of the project. The companies planned to spend an additional $30 million to finish the project, which would be renamed The Gramercy and would retain its New York theme. The companies planned to finish the residential units as apartment rentals rather than condominiums. Because of the legal problems associated with the project, it took more than a year to work out the issues and finalize the purchase. Some issues involving lienholders and lenders still remained after the sale, although these were not expected to have an effect on the project. WGH was interested in the project because of its size and design, and its location near the Las Vegas Beltway.

Construction was underway again in March 2014, with Martin-Harris Construction as the general contractor. The first office and residential tenants were expected to begin moving in later that year. HMS Holdings signed a deal to become the first major office tenant, leasing 65,000 sq ft (6,000 m^{2}) in The Gramercy. Regus also signed on as an office tenant. Other tenants have included Bank of Internet USA, CalAtlantic Homes, and Liberty Mutual. WGH believed that there was strong demand in the area for restaurants, prompting the decision to include several eateries at The Gramercy. Retail was no longer planned for the project, and options were being considered for the decrepit nine-story tower. The Gramercy's opening was marked on November 6, 2014, with the installation of a 10,000-pound letter "G" sculpture.

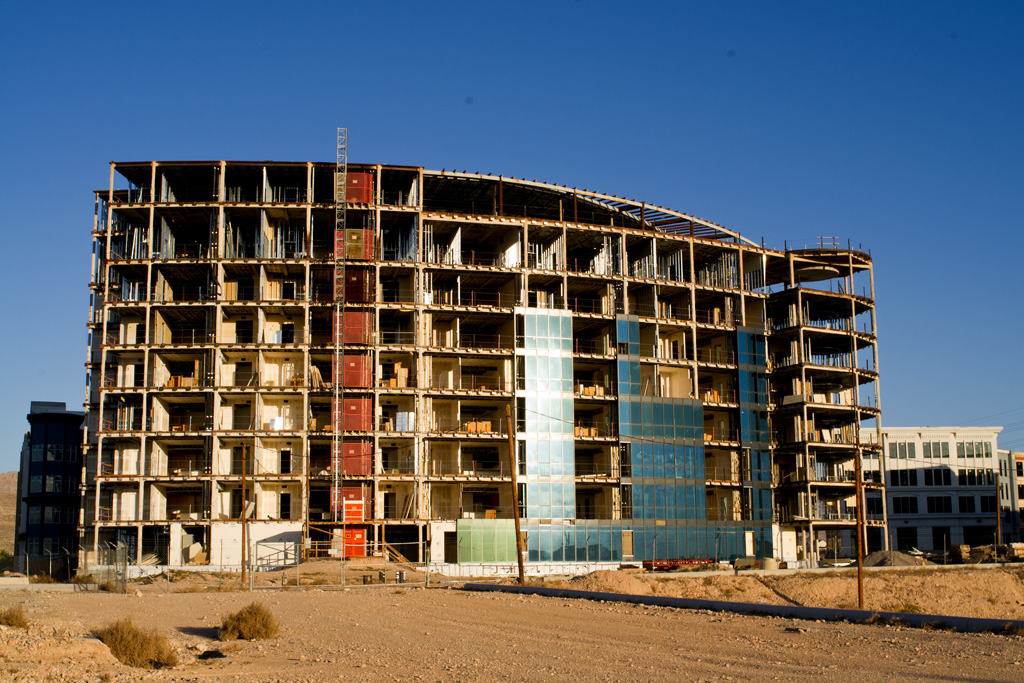
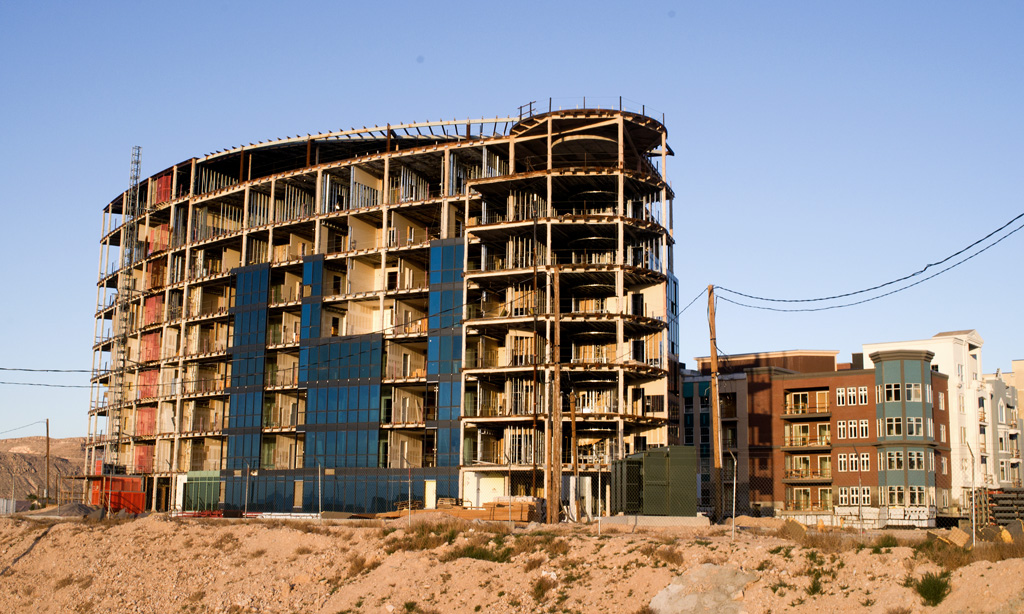
Element House in 2011

A decision was ultimately made to demolish the tower, as finishing it would be too costly because of the building code violations that would need to be addressed. Company executives also felt that the tower's blue glass exterior did not match with the rest of the project. The owners opted to have the tower demolished piece-by-piece, a process that would take months. Demolition began in mid-January 2015, with jackhammering on the top floor. However, the noise could be heard for several blocks away, and there were concerns that it would lead to complaints from office tenants and that it would cause disinterest in prospective apartment renters. A week after demolition began, the owners decided to have the tower demolished through implosion instead.

In preparation for the implosion, the tower was stripped down to a bare frame of steel and concrete. The tower was imploded on the morning of February 15, 2015. The tower had an underground parking garage that extended east of the building by 60 feet. The garage's ceiling was demolished, and the implosion was planned so that the tower would collapse into the garage. It was expected to take four to six weeks to clear the debris and demolish the garage. Potential plans for the now-vacant property included building another tower, possibly with office space. A 90-foot-tall sign was installed at The Gramercy in March 2015.

The Gramercy has 160 apartment units. A courtyard surrounds the various businesses located on the ground-floor, which includes restaurants and a fitness center. At the end of 2016, the last of the remaining office space was being prepared for incoming tenants. In April 2017, the two commercial buildings were sold for $61.75 million to two real estate firms, Koll Company and Estein USA, based respectively in California and Florida. The remainder of The Gramercy – including the apartment buildings and 12.6 acres of vacant property and parking lots – was sold to California-based developer Lyon Living in May 2018, for $45.75 million. The apartment units accounted for $37 million of the sale price. In September 2020, Lyon Living announced plans for a six-story apartment building with 294 units, to be built on the former land of the imploded tower as well as adjacent property. Construction on the apartment building, known as The Highline, began in November 2021 and is expected to conclude two years later.
