= David Chanoff =

American author

David Chanoff (born November 15, 1943, in Philadelphia) is an American author of non-fiction work. His work has typically involved collaborations with the principal protagonist of the work concerned. His collaborators have included Augustus A. White, Joycelyn Elders, Đoàn Văn Toại, William J. Crowe, Ariel Sharon, Kenneth Good and Felix Zandman, among others. He has also written about a wide range of subjects including literary history, education and foreign for The Washington Post, The New Republic and The New York Times Magazine.

Chanoff founded Sudbury Valley School in Framingham, Massachusetts in 1968. In the late 1970s and early 1980s, he taught English at Tufts University and Harvard University.

In 2015, Chanoff's Breaking Ground: My Life in Medicine, co-written with Louis W. Sullivan, won the NAACP Image Award for Outstanding Literary Work – Biography/Autobiography.

== Personal life ==
Chanoff was born November 15, 1943, in Philadelphia to William and Golda (née Levin) Chanoff. He received a Bachelor of Arts from Johns Hopkins University in 1965, after which he attended Brandeis University, where he earned a Master of Arts in 1967 and a Doctor of Philosophy in 1973.

On February 18, 1968, Chanoff married Liisa Laikari. He has three children.

Chanoff is ethnically Jewish.

== Publications ==
- Toại, Đoàn Văn and David Chanoff. (1979). The Vietnamese Gulag, Simon & Schuster.
- Tảng, Trương Như, with David Chanoff and Đoàn Văn Toại. (1985). A Vietcong Memoir: An Inside Account of the Vietnam War and Its Aftermath, Vintage Books.
- Chanoff, David and Đoàn Văn Toại. (1986). Portrait of the Enemy, Random House.
- Chanoff, David and Đoàn Văn Toại. (1986). Vietnam: A Portrait of Its People at War, I.B. Tauris Publishers.
- Bui, Diem with David Chanoff. (1987). In the Jaws of History, Houghton Mifflin.
- Sharon, Ariel, with David Chanoff. (1989). Warrior: the autobiography of Ariel Sharon; New York : Simon and Schuster.
- Deforest, Orin and David Chanoff. (1990). Slow Burn: The Rise and Bitter Fall of American Intelligence in Vietnam, Houghton Mifflin.
- Good, Kenneth and David Chanoff. (1992). Into the heart: one man's pursuit of love and knowledge among the Yanomami, Ulverscroft.
- Crowe, William J. and David Chanoff. (1993). The line of fire: from Washington to the Gulf, the politics and battles of the new military, Simon & Schuster.
- Zandman, Felix and David Chanoff. (1995). Never the last journey: a Fortune 500 founder's life story from Holocaust survivor to victor on Wall Street, Shocken.
- Elders, M Joycelyn and David Chanoff. (1996). Joycelyn Elders, M.D.: from sharecropper's daughter to surgeon general of the United States of America, Morrow.
- Nuwere, Ejovi and David Chanoff. (2002). Hacker Cracker: A Journey from the Mean Streets of Brooklyn to the Frontiers of Cyberspace, Morrow.
- Damone, Vic and David Chanoff. (2009). Singing Was the Easy Part, St. Martin's.
- White, Augustus A. and David Chanoff. (2011). Seeing Patients: Unconscious Bias in Health Care, Harvard University Press.
- Sullivan, Louis W., with David Chanoff. (2014). Breaking Ground: My Life in Medicine, University of Georgia Press.
- Chanoff, Sasha with David Chanoff. (2016). From Crisis to Calling: Finding Your Moral Center in the Toughest Decisions, Barrett-Koehler Publishers.
- Chanoff, David and Louis W. Sullivan. (2022). We'll Fight It Out Here: A History of the Ongoing Struggle for Health Equity, Johns Hopkins University Press.
- Chanoff, David. (2025). Anthony Benezet: Quaker, Abolitionist, Anti-Racist, University of Georgia Press.
