= Alex Edelstein =

Alex Edelstein (born January 17, 1969) is a high-tech executive and reality television participant.

== Career ==
Alex Edelstein is currently a Senior Vice President of Product Management at Salesforce. Previously he was the founder and CEO of The Fr8 Company, a web service that integrates SaaS services such as Slack, Salesforce, and DocuSign. Before that, he created Servio (formerly CloudCrowd) a company in the crowdsourcing space that he co-founded with Jordan Ritter in 2009. Before CloudCrowd, he was a real estate developer and the head of Gemstone Development, which was responsible for the ManhattanWest and Manhattan condominiums. He previously held engineering and management roles at Cloudmark and Inktomi. He product managed early versions of Netscape Navigator. Additionally, he was on the original design team for Microsoft Exchange and Microsoft Outlook.

== Reality Television ==
On April 2, 2009, he was featured on the reality TV show The Millionaire Matchmaker.

== Community ==
He has provided television analysis on both real estate and high-tech topics. He was on the Board of Directors of Kiva.org, a non-profit company that facilities micro-lending in developing countries.

He graduated from Harvard College, and is a resident of San Francisco.
