= Vũng Tàu Charter =

Provisional constitution for South Vietnam

The Vũng Tàu Charter (Hiến chương Vũng Tàu) was a provisional new constitution for South Vietnam which was introduced on the 16 August 1964 by General Nguyễn Khánh. It was known as the Vũng Tàu Charter from Khanh's preferred coastal residence in Vũng Tàu.

The constitution led to the Buddhist Uprising, large scale protests in the country led by Buddhist groups, as the constitution reduced civilian representation in the government, gave Khanh the President's role and would have allowed press censorship. This led President Johnson to state that South Vietnam would have to show signs of political cohesion and stability before there would be military intervention against the North.
