= BindView =

American software company, 1990–2006

BindView Development Corporation
- Formerly: The LAN Support Group (1990–1995)
- Type: Public
- Industry: Software
- Founded: 1990; 36 years ago in Houston, Texas
- Founder: Eric Pulaski
- Defunct: January 2006; 20 years ago
- Fate: Acquired by Symantec Corporation

BindView Development Corporation (NASDAQ: BVEW) was an American software company founded in 1990 by Eric Pulaski in Houston, Texas. The company specialised in network vulnerability management, directory administration and security policy assessment software for Novell NetWare and Microsoft Windows environments. BindView was acquired by Symantec Corporation in January 2006 for approximately $209 million.

== History ==
BindView began in 1990 as The LAN Support Group (LSG), initially developing a viewer for the Novell NetWare bindery — the flat-file directory database that NetWare used to store user, group and network resource records. This tool, called BindView, gave network administrators visibility into bindery contents and access rights that were otherwise difficult to audit.

In 1995, The LAN Support Group renamed itself BindView Development Corporation, and the company expanded beyond its Novell origins to cover Microsoft Windows directory environments as well. The product line evolved from directory browsing into vulnerability management and policy compliance software, helping organisations identify misconfigurations, access anomalies and security weaknesses across network infrastructure and applications.

Pulaski remained as chairman of the board and chief executive officer through to the acquisition. In January 2006, Symantec Corporation completed its acquisition of BindView, folding the vulnerability management product line into its security portfolio.
