= Journal of Vietnamese Studies =

- Discipline: Vietnamese studies
- Language: English
- Edited by: Martha Lincoln, Van Nguyen-Marshall, Peter Zinoman

Publication details
- History: 2006–present
- Publisher: University of California Press (United States)
- Frequency: Quarterly

Standard abbreviations
- ISO 4: J. Vietnam. Stud.

Indexing
- ISSN: 1559-372X (print); 1559-3738 (web)
- LCCN: 2005228026
- JSTOR: 1559372X
- OCLC no.: 62763792

Links
- Journal homepage; Online archive

The Journal of Vietnamese Studies is a quarterly peer-reviewed academic journal covering social science and humanities research about Vietnamese history, politics, culture and, society. It was established in 2006, and is published by University of California Press on behalf of the Center for Southeast Asia Studies at the University of California, Berkeley. Since September 2022, the editors-in-chief are Martha Lincoln (San Francisco State University), Van Nguyen-Marshall (Trent University), and Peter Zinoman (University of California, Berkeley). The journal publishes original articles, book reviews, communications with the editor, and occasionally also translations of Vietnamese language documents and texts.

== Abstracting and indexing ==
The journal is abstracted and indexed in:

- Emerging Sources Citation Index
- International Bibliography of Periodical Literature
- International Bibliography of the Social Sciences
- Index Islamicus
- Modern Language Association Database
- ProQuest databases
- Scopus
