= Radio Saigon =

- Country: South Vietnam
- Headquarters: Saigon
- Broadcast area: South Vietnam
- Launch date: 1930
- Dissolved: 1975
- Former names: Đài phát thanh Sài Gòn
- Replaced by: Voice of Ho Chi Minh City People's Radio

Radio Saigon (also known as Radio Vietnam) was the official international broadcasting station of South Vietnam until April 1975. It was reorganized with a new name Voice of Ho Chi Minh City People's Radio after the Fall of Saigon.

== History ==
1974 English language Voice of Vietnam (Radio Vietnam) foreign service broadcast from Saigon

In 1922 the French Compagnie générale de la télégraphie sans fil established the Centre Radioelectrique on the rue Richaud (now 3 Nguyen Dinh Chieu), Saigon (10.79°N 106.701°E) for government communications. In 1930 Saigon Radio began broadcasting French language news and entertainment programmes. In 1955 following South Vietnamese independence, the station was taken over by the government and renamed Đài phát thanh Sài Gòn broadcasting in Vietnamese.

During the 1960 South Vietnamese coup attempt on 11 November rebel forces captured Radio Saigon and broadcast that a "Revolutionary Council" was in charge of South Vietnam's government, but the rebel forces were soon ejected by forces loyal to President Ngo Dinh Diem.

During the 1963 South Vietnamese coup rebel forces seized Radio Saigon and broadcast a repeating recorded message at five-minute intervals calling on Diệm and his brother Ngô Đình Nhu to give up power, and many officers identified themselves as participants, but the rebel forces were ejected by Presidential Guard forces loyal to Diem.

During the Tet Offensive of January 1968 Radio Saigon was one of the principal Viet Cong (VC) targets. At approximately 03:00 a pair of Army of the Republic of Vietnam (ARVN) trucks stopped on the street in front of the main entrance and around 30 men wearing ARVN military police uniforms jumped out. The leader of the group strode up to the guard at the front entrance as if to speak with him, and then drew his pistol and killed the man. Their pretense no longer necessary, the VC commander and his men from the E2 Water Engineer Company rushed into the building and either killed or subdued the staff inside. Machine gun fire from a nearby building killed a platoon of ARVN Airborne soldiers on the roof. The VC brought along a tape recording of Ho Chi Minh announcing the liberation of Saigon and calling for a "General Uprising" against the government of President Nguyễn Văn Thiệu, but they were unable to broadcast it because the previous day the director-general of the station Lieutenant colonel Vu Duc Vinh had arranged to the take the station off air on giving a prearranged signal. The signal was duly given and the lines from the main studio to the transmission station were cut and instead broadcast a mix of Viennese waltzes, Beatles, Rolling Stones and Vietnamese martial music. At 06:30 a company of ARVN Airborne and several M41 tanks closed in around the radio station. After a six-hour siege the 8 surviving VC detonated 20 kg of explosives killing themselves and doing extensive damage to the building.

Due to the damage sustained in the Tet Offensive the main building was demolished and rebuilt in a modernist style.

At 10:24 on 30 April 1975 Radio Saigon broadcast President Dương Văn Minh's order for all South Vietnamese forces to cease fighting and later his declaration of an unconditional surrender.
