= Sadahiko Hirose =

Japanese businessman

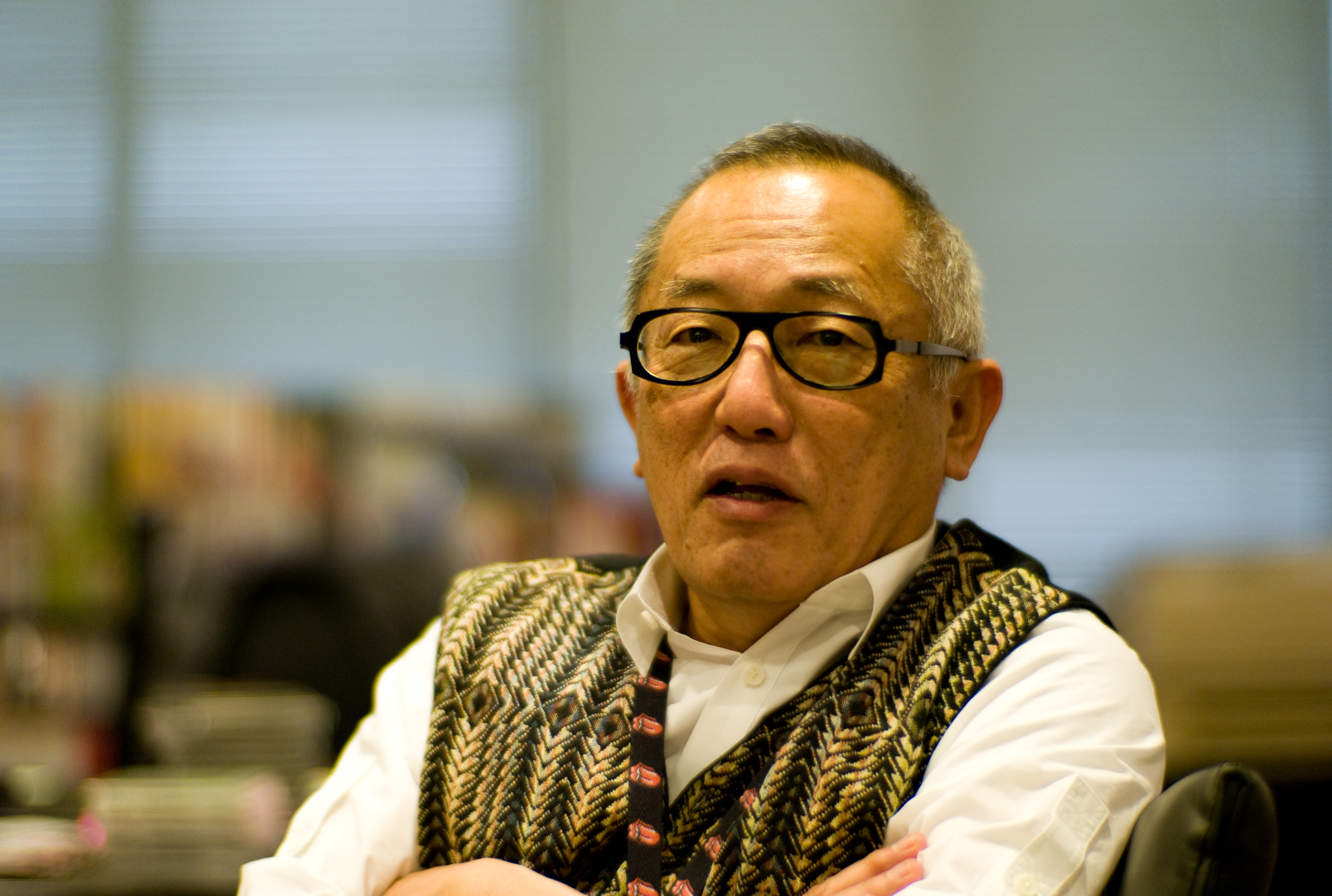
Sadahiko Hirose

Sadahiko Hirose (廣瀬 禎彦, born April 4, 1943 in Shimane Prefecture) is the president of Columbia Music Entertainment. He received both undergraduate and master's degrees from Keio University. Mr. Hirose, who was formerly CEO and President of NetHome, became the CEO of Columbia as of January 1, 2004.

Sadahiko Hirose started out his career with IBM in a computer business. He was then engaged in publishing with a venture business named ASCII and later in the video game business with Sega. Not long before accepting the job at Columbia, he had been running a broadband Internet business.
