= Operations Malheur I and Malheur II =

Part of the Vietnam War (1967)

- Part of Vietnam War
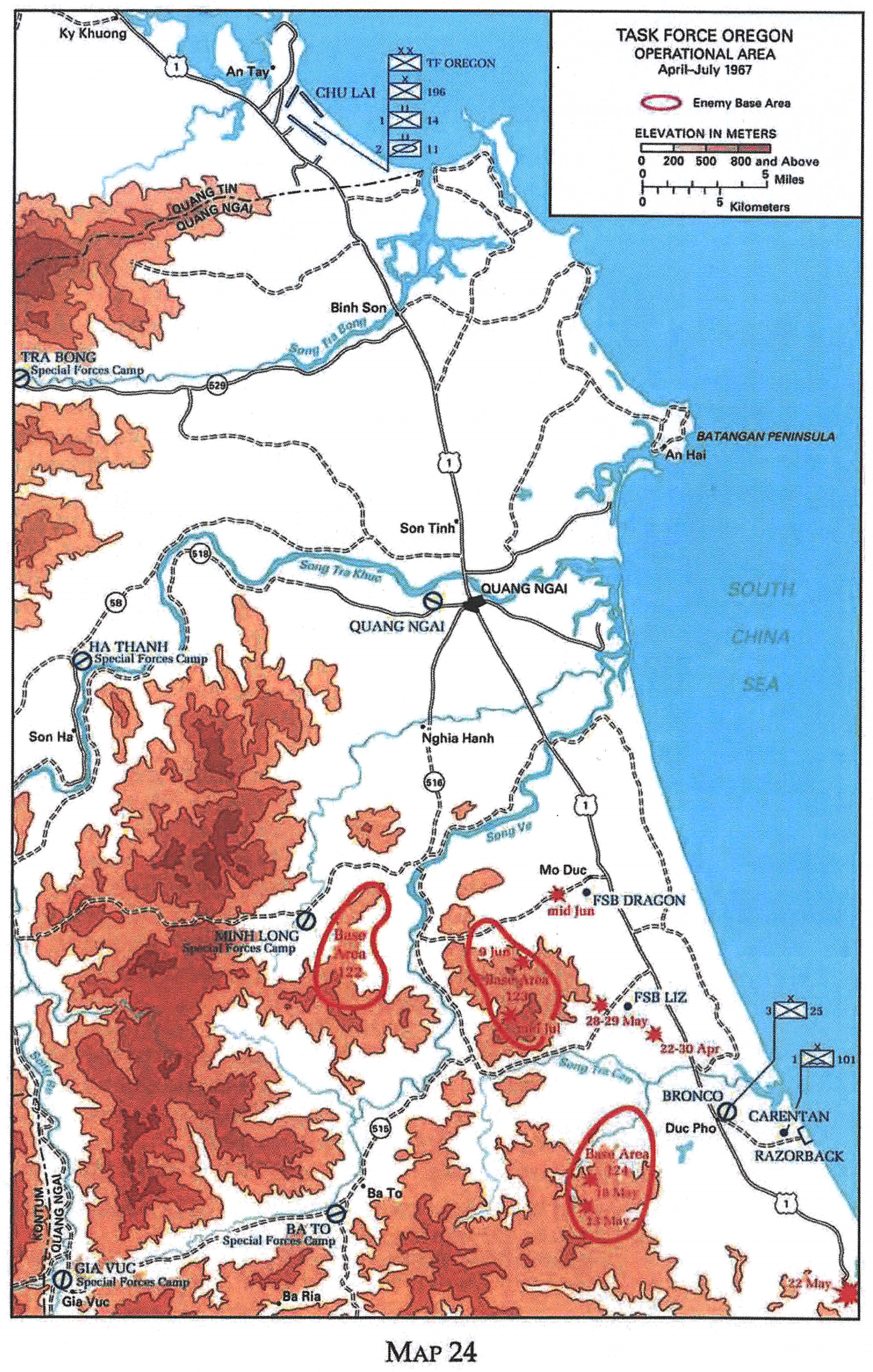
- Task Force Oregon Operational Area April - July 1967
Date	11 May – 2 August 1967
Location	Quảng Ngãi Province
Result	US operational success

Belligerents
United States; South Vietnam	North Vietnam; Viet Cong

Commanders and leaders
Salve H. Matheson	

Casualties and losses
(United States) 81 killed	US body count 869 killed 314 weapons recovered

Operation Malheur I and Operation Malheur II were a series of search and destroy operations conducted by the 1st Brigade 101st Airborne Division operating as part of Task Force Oregon in Quảng Ngãi Province, South Vietnam.

== Operation Malheur I ==
On 29 April, COMUSMACV General William Westmoreland ordered the 1st Brigade commanded by Brigadier General Salve H. Matheson to immediately join Task Force Oregon in I Corps. In early May the brigade put ashore at Razorback Beach in southern Quảng Ngai, established a base named Carentan, and prepared for action against the People's Army of Vietnam (PAVN)/Viet Cong (VC)'s inland base areas-numbered 122, 123 and 124 which ran from north to south through the mountainous jungle overlooking the Ve and Tra Cau River Valleys. On 11 May, the 1st Brigade moved into the interior looking for the 1st and 2nd Regiments, both of which were thought to lurk there. Two of the three battalions conducted air assaults into the western part of Base Area 124, a tangle of tree-clad low hills overlooking the coastal plain. Resistance was light. The next morning Matheson committed his remaining battalion to a blocking position on high ground in the eastern part of the base area and ordered the other two battalions to sweep toward it. Encountering little opposition in the days that followed, Matheson decentralized his operations and conducted a more rigorous search. Matheson allowed each battalion commander to work his operational area as he saw fit, insisting only that companies operate within a two-hour march of each other. Most units kept constantly on the move and traveled with three to five days' worth of supplies, so the PAVN/VC would be less likely to pinpoint their location by observing resupply helicopters. Companies split into platoons for wider coverage of a search area, but remained close enough to reassemble quickly if they ran into a sizable force. These tactics often paid off. On 13 May, near the Tra Cau's headwaters, 12 separate firefights occurred, the largest against an entrenched VC company. By nightfall, the Americans had killed 29 VC at a cost of 1 American killed and 7 wounded, but the outcome was not always so one-sided. On 18 May Company B, 2nd Battalion, 502nd Infantry Regiment, moved well inside a large VC camp before realizing that the occupants had not yet fled. Confusion reigned during the firefight, and the Americans realized they were too close to their enemy to call in artillery or helicopter gunships. For six hours they fought, sometimes hand to hand, until reinforcements arrived and the VC pulled back. Left on the battlefield were 31 VC dead, while American casualties were 12 killed and 41 wounded. Matheson's men completed their scouring of Base Area 124 in early June, reporting that they had killed or captured over 400 VC, seized 125 weapons, and razed several base camps.

== Operation Malheur II ==
Task Force Oregon commander General William B. Rosson then ordered Matheson to shift his attention slightly north, to Base Areas 123 and 122. Both were more mountainous than 124 and were often drenched by cloudbursts leftover from storms brewing around the inland peaks near the Laotian border. If Matheson failed to find VC there, he was to assist the Quảng Ngãi province chief with the evacuation of all civilians from the Ve and Tra Cau Valleys. Whatever their political loyalties, these civilians had provided food and recruits for the VC. Matheson sent two battalions into Base Area 123 on 8 June and another into 122 the following day. While the first day's fighting ended with 22 VC killed, it was apparent to the Americans that the VC were trying to avoid contact. With few enemy units to be found, Matheson turned to evacuating civilians. For two weeks trucks and helicopters moved over 7,000 people and 1,200 head of cattle to refugee centers in Đức Phổ and Nghĩa Hành Districts. When the operation ended in late June, the valleys had been laid waste by combat and herbicides, while several hundred tons of rice and salt were either destroyed or airlifted to refugee centers. In July, believing that the VC were re-forming in Base Area 124, the airborne brigade returned south. A week of searching, however, uncovered only small enemy units. Documents and prisoners revealed that both the 1st and 2nd Regiments had lost several commanders and that illness, desertions and heavy casualties had greatly diminished their effectiveness. When Matheson received a report in mid-July that the two units were converging on Base Area 123 to form a single combat-effective regiment, he called in B-52s. On the heels of the bombing, all three of his battalions air-assaulted back into the region, which they again swept clean through the rest of the month. Yet, once again, the VC evaded, though American sweeps killed over 100 VC, including a VC district chief and his aides.

== Aftermath ==
When the operations closed, the 1st Brigade reported 869 VC and PAVN killed and 314 weapons captured, for the loss of 81 US killed. The United States Agency for International Development reported 6,400 civilian casualties in the province for 1967 throughout the year, though obviously not all of these could be attributed to the Malheur operations or even to American military action.
