= Cao Văn Viên =

South Vietnamese general (1921–2008)

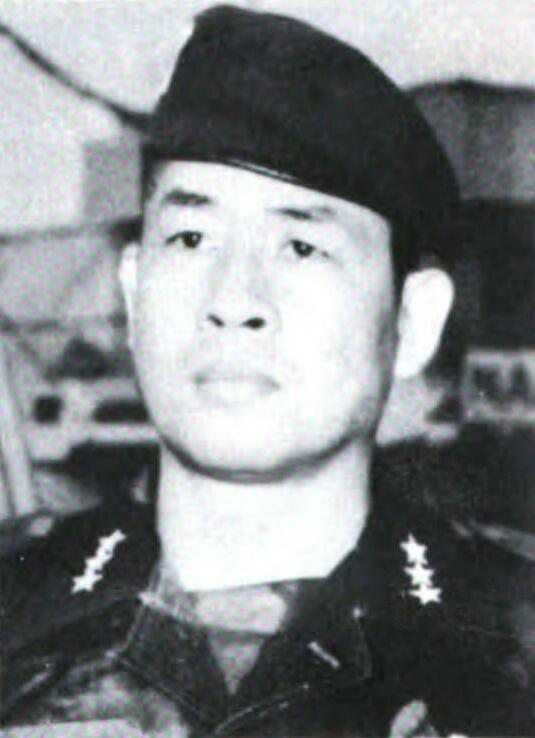

Chief of the Joint General Staff of the Republic of Vietnam Military Forces
- In office 1 October 1965 – 30 April 1975
- President: Nguyễn Văn Thiệu; Trần Văn Hương; Dương Văn Minh
- Preceded by: Nguyễn Hữu Có
- Succeeded by: Position abolished

Personal details
- Born: December 21, 1921 Vientiane, French Laos
- Died: January 22, 2008 (aged 86) Annandale, Virginia, U.S.
- Spouse: Tran Thi Tao (died 1991)
- Children: 3, including Lan Cao
- Awards: National Order of Vietnam; Silver Star; Legion of Merit

Military service
- Allegiance: State of Vietnam; Republic of Vietnam
- Branch/service: Vietnamese National Army; Army of the Republic of Vietnam
- Years of service: 1949 – October 25, 1955 (Vietnamese National Army); October 26, 1955 – April 30, 1975 (Army of the Republic of Vietnam)
- Rank: General (Đại Tướng)
- Commands: Vietnamese Airborne Division; III Corps; Chairman, Joint General Staff, Vietnamese Armed Forces; Vietnamese Navy (acting)
- Battles/wars: Battle of Kiến Phong (now Đồng Tháp Province)

Cao Văn Viên (Vietnamese pronunciation: [kaːw˧˧ van˧˧ viən˧˧]; December 21, 1921 – January 22, 2008) was a four-star army general in the Army of the Republic of Vietnam during the Vietnam War. He rose to the position of Chairman of the South Vietnamese Joint General Staff. Considered one of "the most gifted" of South Vietnam's military leaders, he was previously called an "absolute key figure" and one of "the most important Vietnamese military leaders" in the U.S.-led fighting during the Vietnam War. Along with Trần Thiện Khiêm he was one of only two four-star generals in the entire history of South Vietnam.

== Early life ==
Viên was born to Vietnamese parents in Vientiane, Laos, in December 1921. His parents was a merchant from Đông Anh district, a town east of Hanoi, Tonkin protectorate. Hearing rumors of a gold rush in the Mekong Delta, he moved to what was then called Cochinchina to become a prospector. Although he became a follower of Ho Chi Minh and fought as a guerrilla against French colonial rule, he soon concluded that Hồ's movement was more communist than nationalist, and joined independent fighter groups. He was captured by the French, released, and enrolled at the University of Saigon where he obtained a bachelor's degree in French literature. His schoolmate was Lâm Quang Thi.

== Military career ==
Viên attended the French-run Cap Saint-Jacques Military School, graduating with a commission in the Vietnamese National Army as a second lieutenant in 1949. Later, he was sent to France to train at the Infantry School in Coëtquidan, where he began to make friends with Nguyễn Văn Thiệu and Trần Thiện Khiêm. He rose quickly through the ranks, becoming a battalion commander in 1953 and major in 1954. He attended the Vietnamese National Military Academy as a lieutenant, where he met and became friendly with many of South Vietnam's later military leaders. He twice served in military intelligence (in 1953 and 1954), and twice as a military logistics officer. After the formation of the Army of the Republic of Vietnam (ARVN) in 1955, he was appointed chief of military logistics for the ARVN Joint General Staff. Viên was promoted to lieutenant colonel and appointed Chief of Staff of the Special Military Staff in the office of the President of the Republic in 1956. He and his family moved to a modest home in the Cholon neighborhood of Saigon (where he lived until April 1975). He graduated from the United States Army Command and General Staff College in 1957. By 1960, he had completed parachute training with both the Vietnamese and American military, earned his Vietnamese combat pilot's license, and earned his American combat helicopter pilot's license. He was promoted to colonel in 1960 and named Commander of the Vietnamese Airborne Division in November 1960. This came after Colonel Nguyễn Chánh Thi and Lieutenant Colonel Vương Văn Đông, the two highest-ranking paratroopers led a failed coup attempt against Diem and fled into exile in Cambodia. Based on his experiences, Viên concluded in 1961 that the Viet Cong were no longer acting alone but were being led and reinforced by regular units of the People's Army of Vietnam (PAVN).

Viên refused to participate in the 1963 coup against South Vietnamese President Ngô Đình Diệm. He was one of several military leaders who were unaware of the coup. When called to a lunchtime meeting with other senior officers and informed of the coup d'état, he reportedly broke down in tears and resigned, refusing to go along with the putsch. Vien was not aware of the plot, and the generals had discussed whether to assassinate him during their planning phase because they knew he was a Diem admirer. His loyalty to the conspirators now suspect, a rifle was thrust into his back and he was moments from being killed. But Major General Tôn Thất Đính had spoken with General Dương Văn Minh during the planning for the coup and convinced Minh to save Viên's life. Dinh played mahjong with Vien's wife, and had convinced Minh that Vien would not oppose the coup. Vien had planned with Diem to allow the president to take refuge at his home in the event of a coup, but the offer could not be taken up because the rebels surrounded Vien's house after taking him into custody. Another account has him accepting the coup after being informed of it. General Lâm Quang Thi later recalled that Viên was a Diem loyalist, but remained neutral during the coup. Viên was briefly imprisoned and stripped of his command, but reinstated a month later.

Viên was a critical supporter of the January 1964 South Vietnamese coup in which President Dương Văn Minh was toppled by General Nguyễn Khánh, plotting with him to overthrow Minh and successfully ordering his Airborne Division troops to help secure the capital. By March 14, Viên had been promoted by the new regime to brigadier general.

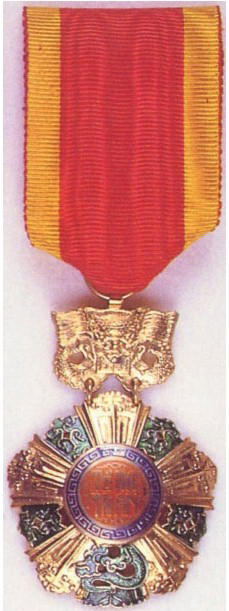
National Order of Vietnam, Knight, awarded to Col. Viên for his actions at the Battle of Kiến Phong in 1964.

While commanding troops during action in Kiến Phong Province (now Đồng Tháp Province) in March 1964, his unit was ambushed and surrounded on three sides. Viên was wounded in the upper arm and shoulder, and was decorated by the United States with the Silver Star and by the Republic of Vietnam with the National Order of Vietnam (Knight). The Silver Star citation said that while leading his men in an anti-communist assault, and despite "the confusion and inferno of enemy fire" from both sides and an arm and shoulder wound, Vien "continued to exercise command vigorously and effectively until the enemy had been routed". Viên was the first senior South Vietnamese military officer to be wounded in the field. His actions won him widespread respect from American military officers. In mid-October 1964 Viên was named Commander of III Corps, which held the critical region around Saigon.

Viên was appointed Chief of Staff of the Joint General Staff (JGS) on September 11, 1964, after President Khanh dismissed General Nguyễn Văn Thiệu to win Buddhist support for his government. As Chief of Staff of the JGS, he controlled troop movements around the capital and assigned officers to a few critical positions. He supported Khanh and helped suppress a counter-coup by Major General Dương Văn Đức on September 14, 1964. He helped put down another coup on September 27. Along with General Nguyễn Chánh Thi, Air Commodore Nguyễn Cao Kỳ, General Nguyễn Văn Thiệu, and Admiral Chung Tấn Cang, he supported a coup against Prime Minister Trần Văn Hương in December 1964. He led the then-biggest helicopter attack of the war in February 1965. When Viet Cong forces launched a mortar attack on the city of Đồng Xoài on June 10, 1965, Viên held U.S. forces from attacking—keeping the U.S. out of the war at a time when the United States was still attempting to avoid active involvement in the war. When President Phan Khắc Sửu resigned on June 17, 1965, and now-Air Marshal Nguyễn Cao Kỳ succeeded him, Viên was made a member of the military council which acted as a de facto cabinet.

=== Joint General Staff ===
Viên was promoted to Chief of the Joint General Staff (JGS) on October 1, 1965. He was promoted to major general on November 1, 1965, during the celebrations accompanying the second anniversary of Diem's assassination, and by January 1966 had been promoted again to lieutenant general. Viên seemed an unlikely choice for such a high position, but he was one of the few generals who could not be accused of having cooperated with the French colonial regime, his loyalty to the Diem regime and his role as a coup leader made him acceptable to conservatives and liberals alike, and he was remarkably apolitical. The appointment may also not have been as important as it appeared, for the JGS was almost routinely excluded from command decisions (which were often made by South Vietnam's military presidents). He had no authority to promote colonels to general, or promote generals to higher rank. At least one historian has characterized his tenure as JGS Chief as "ineffectual". An American general later said he believed that Viên used presidential interference in JGS decision-making as a means of avoiding blame and therefore did not challenge presidential decisions as much as he might otherwise have done. Major General Hoàng Xuân Lãm (Commander, I Corps) and Lieutenant General Lê Nguyên Khang (Commander, III Corps) were both particularly loyal to Viên, and helped the South Vietnamese government retain some degree of political stability. His control over the Corps was further strengthened when Prime Minister Kỳ appointed Brigadier General Nguyễn Văn Mạnh, another Viên loyalist, Commander of IV Corps in November 1966. With this appointment, Viên (along with Kỳ, Khang, and director of information Lt. Gen. Nguyễn Bảo Trí) was considered by American observers to be one of the most powerful people in the government.

Viên nonetheless attempted to be an active strategic thinker and reformer as JGS Chief. In 1965, he proposed invading Laos and establishing a defensive line across the southern portion of that country in order to cut off the Viet Cong's flow of supplies coming down the Ho Chi Minh trail. He met with U.S. President Lyndon B. Johnson in Guam in February 1966 to discuss the plan, but Johnson refused to authorize U.S. military support for the campaign, and it never went forward. In September 1966, Viên sought and won command of the Vietnamese Navy and for the first time integrated naval plans into JGS planning, but this arrangement lasted only two months. Viên also worked to improve the relationship between his military leaders and their American advisors. When a leading general complained that American advisors were interfering in the chain of command, Viên held a meeting of all senior military leaders to smooth over the differences and reassure his commanders. Unlike many senior South Vietnamese military leaders, he was not shy of strongly criticizing units and commanders which he felt did not perform well. He said the 25th Division, led by Brigadier General Phân Trường Chinh, was "the worst division in ARVN, and possibly the worst division in any army." He instituted modern accounting systems to improve the payment of salaries and benefits, and fought for and won a harsh new law designed to catch and punish deserters. He also retained a limited role in commanding troops in the field. At the command of Prime Minister Kỳ, he personally led troops to Da Nang and Huế during the Buddhist Uprising of April 1966 and helped crush the rebellion of General Nguyễn Chánh Thi. He also instituted new fire control procedures designed to reduce air and artillery strikes against civilian targets. Even as late as 1968, he was in the field assessing the use of modern weapons (such as heavy helicopters and advanced missiles) by the enemy.

=== Defense Minister ===
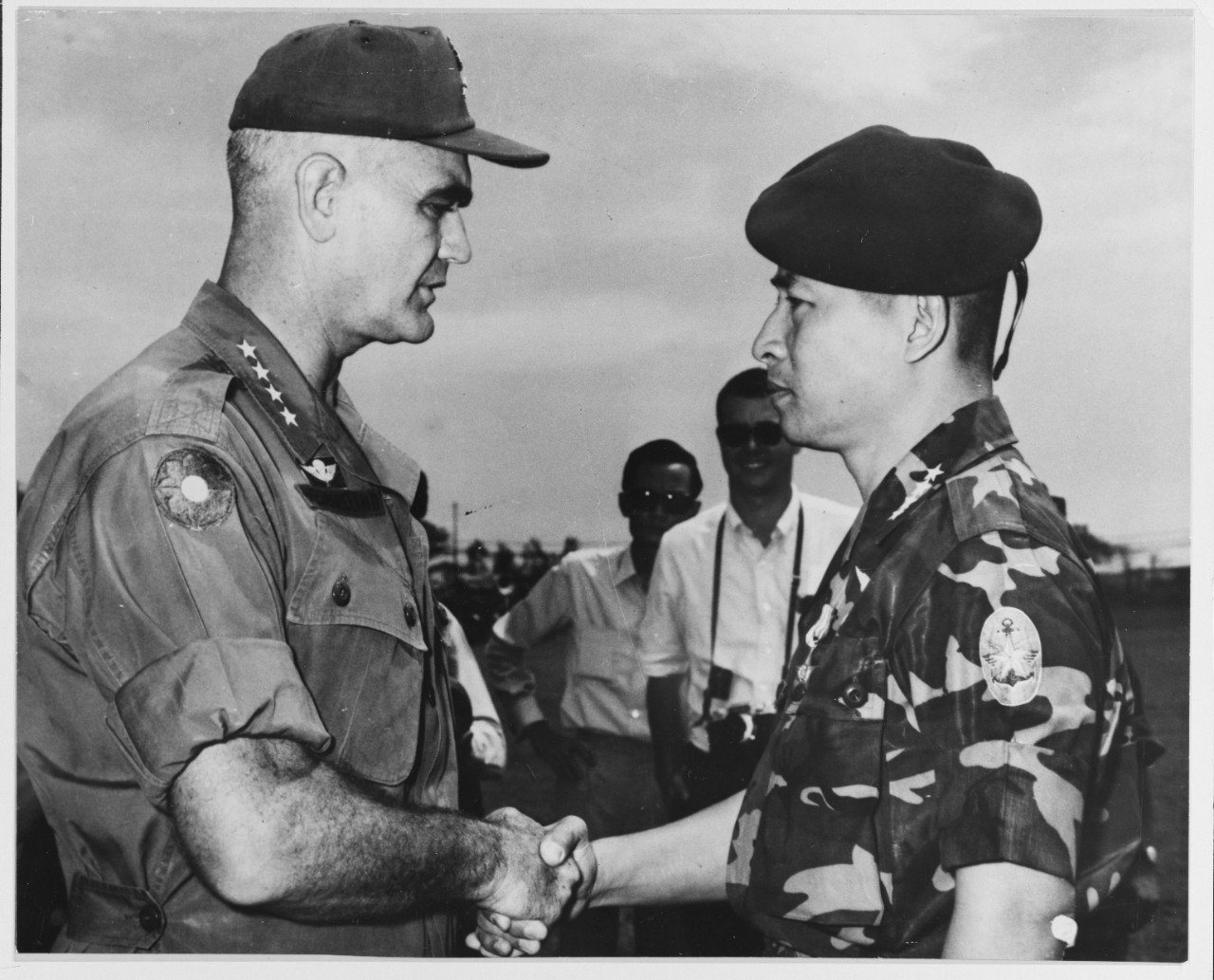
General William Westmoreland presents the Silver Star to General Cao Van Vien, May 1967

On January 26, 1967, Prime Minister Kỳ announced that Lt. Gen. Nguyễn Hữu Có had been replaced as Defense Minister by Lt. Gen. Viên. Viên did not, however, assume the post of Deputy Prime Minister as the Defense Minister usually did. Viên was promoted to full General on February 5, 1967. In his role as Defense Minister, General Viên and Lt. Gen. Nguyễn Văn Vy were appointed to a committee to investigate and root out corruption among the top South Vietnamese military leadership. More than 50 ARVN officers were removed from service in the campaign's first push. (After the war ended, however, Viên was accused of refusing to act on accusations of corruption presented to him.) Viên also strongly criticized in a letter to General William Westmoreland (the senior U.S. military commander in South Vietnam) what he saw as an over-pessimistic and derogatory article by the U.S. news media about South Vietnamese troops and combat actions. Gen. Westmoreland subsequently assigned "military-information advisors" at the corps and division level to smooth over relations.

The summer of 1967, Viên played a critical role in helping overcome a political crisis in the government. In September 1966, South Vietnamese voters elected a Constituent Assembly which was charged with writing a new constitution for the Republic of Vietnam. The new constitution was promulgated in March 1967, and local elections held. A presidential election was scheduled for September 3, 1967, but Air Marshal and Prime Minister Nguyễn Cao Kỳ and Head of State Gen. Nguyễn Văn Thiệu both sought the presidency. With the U.S. military preparing for a major expansion in its armed forces in Vietnam, American diplomats and senior military officers made it clear that they would not tolerate another military coup or interference in the electoral process. Under the pretense of holding a meeting of the Armed Forces Council (an informal body of senior army, navy, and air force leaders to discuss military policy), Lt. Gen. Viên forced the military to resolve the crisis by unofficially backing one of the two candidates. With the assent of Prime Minister Kỳ, the support was unofficial so that if the military's candidate did not win the loss would not be seen as a public lack of confidence in the armed forces. After a three-day meeting, the military agreed to support Thiệu for president and Kỳ for executive vice president. Viên may have supported a Kỳ candidacy at first. According to Ky, Viên was for a short time considered for the presidency, but Viên refused and no majority formed behind his candidacy. Viên subsequently traveled to Thailand and met with exiled general Dương Văn Minh, warning him not to return to South Vietnam in an attempt to seek the presidency.

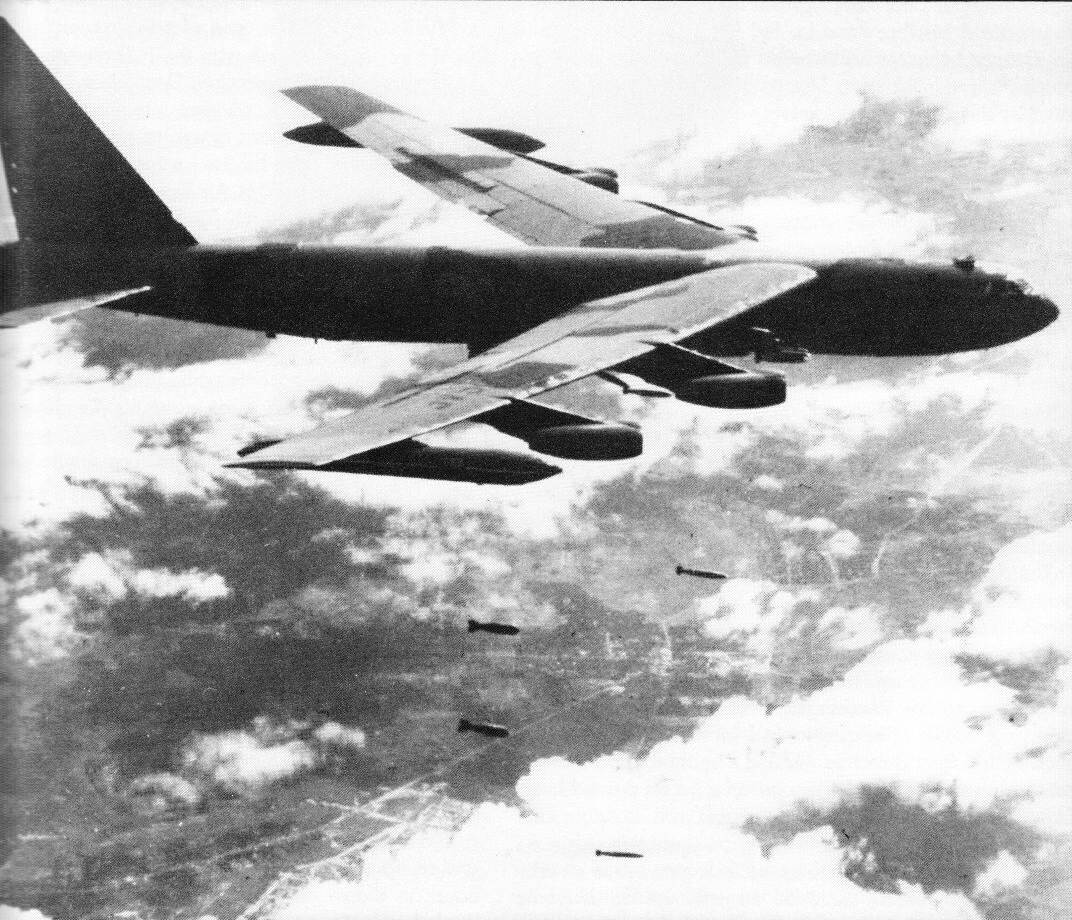
The secret U.S. bombing campaign in Cambodia was accidentally revealed by Defense Minister Viên in August 1967

On August 10, 1967, Viên held his first press conference since becoming Chief of the JGS or Defense Minister, and accidentally revealed the existence of a secret, major bombing campaign against Viet Cong and PAVN troops in Cambodia. Since 1965, the United States had been making increasingly regular bombing raids on suspected Viet Cong and PAVN staging and supply areas throughout Cambodia. In his press conference on August 10, Gen. Viên briefly discussed the existence of the secret bombings, and declared them a failure. The U.S. government immediately and categorically denied that any such bombings had taken place. Gen. Viên was the first high military official in either South Vietnam or the United States to admit that the U.S. was bombing Cambodia.

Thiệu had initially signalled that he would replace Viên as Defense Minister with Lt. Gen. Vy if he won the presidency. But when Thiệu won the presidential election on September 3, he agreed to keep Viên as Defense Minister even though most of the cabinet would now be civilians rather than military personnel. He was also a member of the National Security Council, a body created by the new constitution to advise the President and Prime Minister on issues of national importance. He continued to act as a chief military strategist for the government, working with Gen. Westmoreland on the Combined Campaign Plan for 1967. In his role as Chief of the JGS and Defense Minister, Viên was the highest-ranking government official to greet President Johnson at Cam Ranh Bay when he made his second battle-zone trip to Vietnam in December 1967.

As Defense Minister, Gen. Viên also attempted to reform the government's pacification campaign. The failure of the Strategic Hamlet Program (an attempt to separate peasants from the Viet Cong by moving the population into fortified villages) by 1963 led to a re-emphasis on a military solution by 1965. The Phoenix Program, designed to identify and either capture or kill Viet Cong insurgents, was implemented and the South Vietnamese government began to focus on the "Revolutionary Development" program of economic development. In 1966, Viên and Westmoreland agreed to train ARVN troops in "clear and hold" pacification tactics. Although the American and South Vietnamese governments both realized the importance of pacification, the pacification program showed few results and was close to collapse by mid-1967. In September 1967, Major General Nguyễn Đức Thắng, Viên's deputy at the JGS, was appointed Minister of Construction and Development to revitalize the pacification program. Thắng proposed and Viên approved a plan for reform that would: 1) Require provincial chiefs to report to the Ministry of Construction and Development and the Minister for Pacification in Saigon and not military Corps commanders; 2) Strip Corps commanders of their ability to appoint province chiefs; 3) Transfer the role of Government Delegate for each province from Corps commanders to civilian political leaders; and 4) Transfer control of ARVN battalions engaged in pacification campaigns from Corps commanders to the Minister for Pacification. Viên sought the advice of Gen. Westmoreland, who agreed that the plan should be implemented. But President Thiệu repeatedly refused to implement the plan, fearing the loss of political support. Angry at Thiệu's action, Maj. Gen. Thắng resigned in January 1968 and became Viên's personal assistant.

Thiệu replaced Viên as Defense Minister with Lt. Gen. Nguyễn Văn Vy on November 98, 1967. Viên's departure was not seen as a snub or loss of political power, but rather as a way of relieving him of the less important duties of Defense Minister so that he could focus on prosecuting the war.

=== Role during Tet Offensive ===
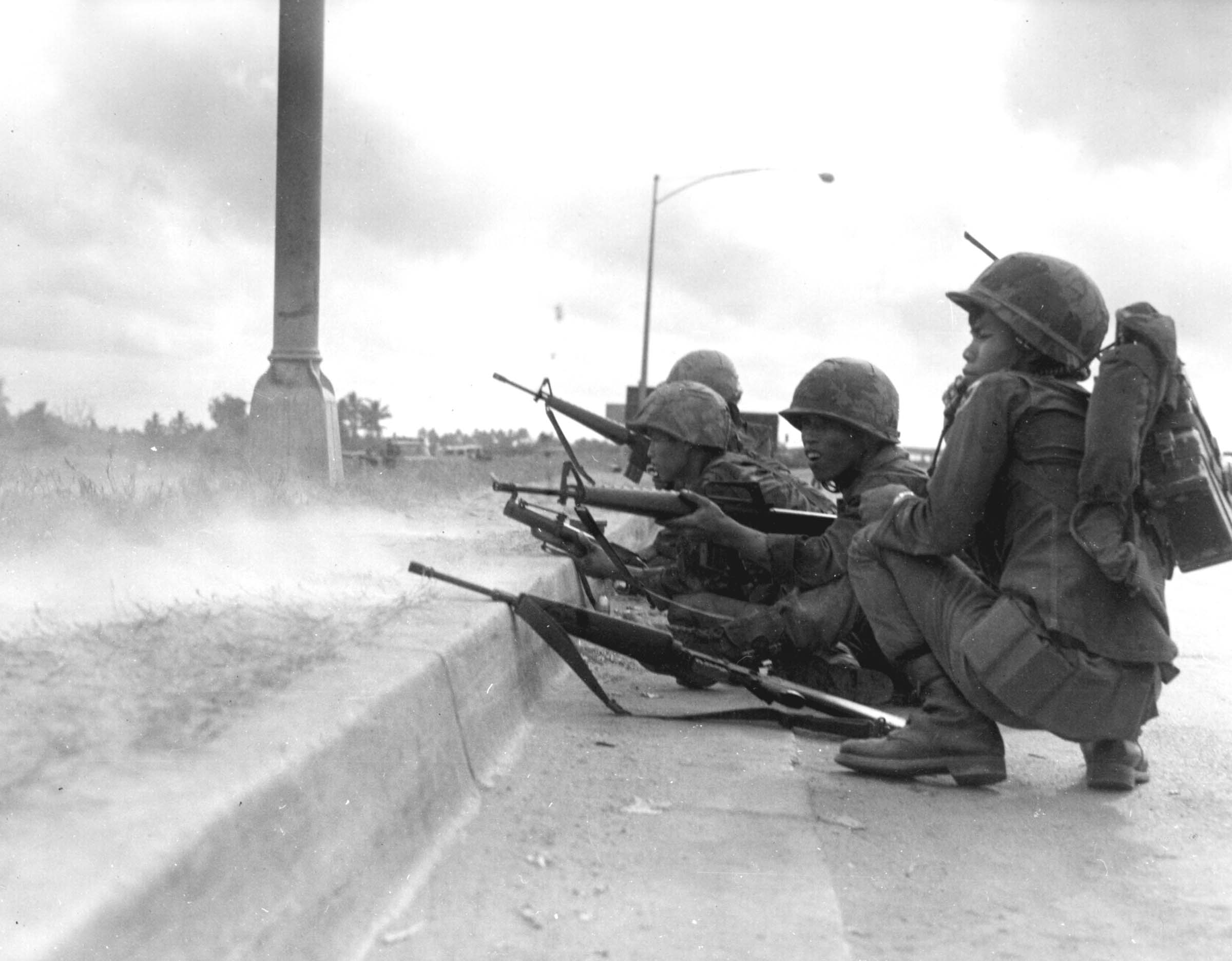
ARVN soldiers defend Saigon during the Tet Offensive

Viên played a critical role in the Tet Offensive of January 31, 1968. Fearing an attack during Tết (the Vietnamese New Year), Westmoreland had advised Viên to limit the traditional Tết cease-fire to just 24 hours. Viên tried but failed to win approval for this limitation. Viet Cong and PAVN forces attacked I and II Corps shortly after midnight on January 31, and Saigon and III Corps at about 3 AM local time. Not alerted to the extent of the battle but realizing after several hours that a major attack on Saigon was under way, Viên was forced to drive himself through the back streets of Saigon at 7 AM to reach JGS headquarters at Tân Sơn Nhứt Airport. JGS Headquarters was one of six critical targets for the VC, and elements of the C-10 Sapper Battalion were assigned to attack the complex. Shortly after his arrival, VC seized control of Gate 4 at the airport and were threatening to attack JGS Headquarters. By sheer luck, two armed and supplied battalions were at Tân Sơn Nhứt awaiting transport to I Corps. Viên immediately ordered their dispersal throughout the city of Saigon, preventing a collapse in the city's defense. Retaining two companies, he ordered a counter-attack against the VC elements controlling access to the airport and threw them back. Due to the severe lack of personnel, Vien used almost his entire staff as combat personnel and took personal command of them in the field to repel the attack on the air base. Majors and colonels led platoons and captains and lieutenants acted as privates. Thanks to Viên's actions, JGS Headquarters remained the only secure military location in Saigon. Kỳ and most of the top generals in the city spent the next several days in Viên's office coordinating the counter-attack, sleeping on his office rug at night. Viên coordinated the city's defense throughout the first critical hours of the Tet Offensive, ordering JGS officers and staff into the streets to personally lead combat divisions throughout Saigon. Most of the fighting in the city ended by dawn the next day, although small elements held out until March 7. Viên personally led troops in Operation Tran Hung Dao, the counter-offensive which began on February 3.

In the aftermath of the Tet Offensive, Viên became convinced that North Vietnam intended to cut South Vietnam in two by occupying the Central Highlands. Westmoreland disagreed, and reinforced Khe Sanh Combat Base more than 185 miles (298 km) to the north. On April 1, 1968, Viên attended a meeting at Nha Trang called by Westmoreland and attended by Westmoreland, Lt. Gen. Lê Nguyên Khang (Commander of III Corps), General Creighton Abrams (who was due to succeed Westmoreland on June 10, 1968) and Deputy Ambassador to Vietnam Samuel D. Berger. Berger made an impromptu speech declaring the Tet Offensive a great victory for South Vietnam and urging support for Thiệu (rumors of another coup were rife). But angry at what he perceived as Thiệu's lack of aggressive prosecution of the war and exhausted by his duties, Viên allegedly attempted to resign on April 3, 1968. Viên then denied he had done so, instead saying that he threatened to do so if U.S. and South Vietnamese forces were put under a unified command.

Vien later criticised the U.S. and South Vietnam for not pressing home their advantage and going on a large-scale offensive in an attempt to totally defeat the communists immediately.

=== Post-Defense Minister role ===
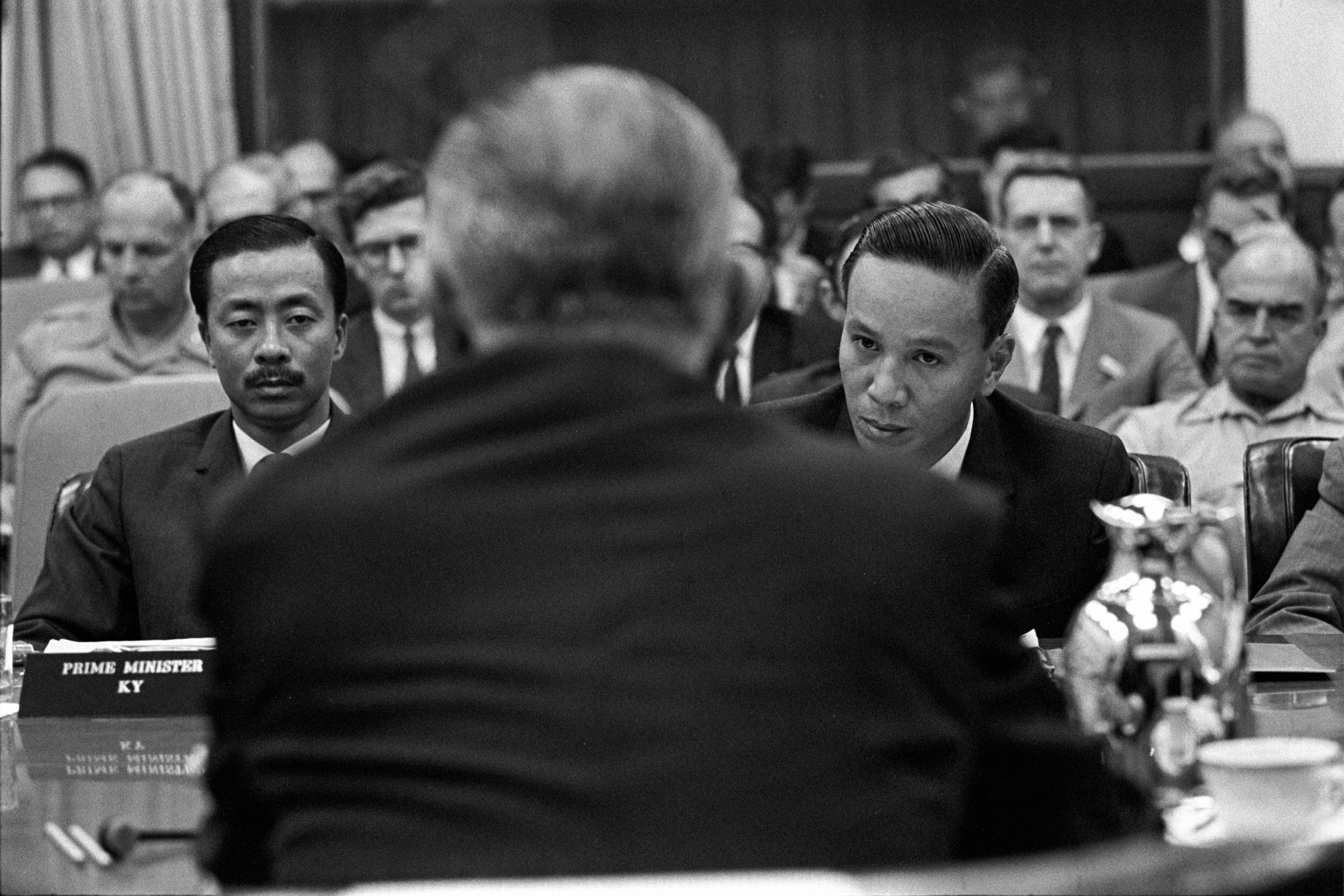
Gen. Viên accompanied Prime Minister Kỳ and President Thiệu to this meeting in Honolulu, Hawaii, in July 1968 with President Lyndon Johnson.

Thiệu considered replacing Viên as JGS Chair in June 1968, but kept him in the position. Viên remained a strong supporter of Kỳ, who remained a very powerful figure in the government and had the support of nearly 1 million Roman Catholic refugees in the country. Viên (like Kỳ) opposed the appointment of Trần Văn Hương as Prime Minister, and Kỳ signalled to Thiệu that he would not like to see Viên or the other generals who supported Kỳ removed from their positions. Viên subsequently accompanied Thiệu to Hawaii for yet another meeting with President Johnson in July 1968 and to an eight-day state visit to Taiwan and South Korea in May 1969. Viên's political position remained unstable, however. Several times in 1969 and 1970, Trần Văn Hương advised Thiệu to replace Vien with Lt. Gen. Đỗ Cao Trí.

Viên continued to act as chief strategist for South Vietnamese armed forces, but his influence was increasingly impaired. In June 1968, he advocated that the U.S. resume bombing of North Vietnam. In September 1968, he advocated the invasion and occupation of Cambodia, Laos and southern North Vietnam. But as President Johnson and later President Richard Nixon began implementing the policy of Vietnamization (under which there would be gradual American troop withdrawals and extensive re-arming and training of ARVN forces with the aim of leaving the war completely in the hands of the South Vietnamese), Viên and other South Vietnamese military leaders were rarely consulted or informed ahead of time about these decisions. For example, when the U.S. considered an immediate halt to all bombing of North Vietnam in October 1968, only Thiệu was consulted. Viên nonetheless was forced to help implement Vietnamization. Based on the conversations in Hawaii six months earlier, he held the first JGS discussions on American troop withdrawals in January 1969. Viên remained silent about his views of the American policy, but his aides were extremely pessimistic about its success. Viên did, however, support Ambassador Ellsworth Bunker's "One War" strategy (under which pacification, counter-insurgency and Vietnamization all took equal importance) and assisted Abrams with developing the Combined (US/SVN) Strategic Objective Plan of 1969. The plan involved the transfer of hundreds of American military camps to the South Vietnamese armed forces. Many ARVN officers criticized Viên's plan to base ARVN troops in these static positions, arguing that it isolated the Army from the populace, hurt morale and reduced mobility. Viên accompanied Thiệu to Midway Atoll in June 1969, where the two men learned of Nixon's intention to withdraw 25,000 American troops from South Vietnam within 60 days. In what became the then-largest single transfer of military equipment to South Vietnam, Viên received 64 river patrol boats from the United States just days later.

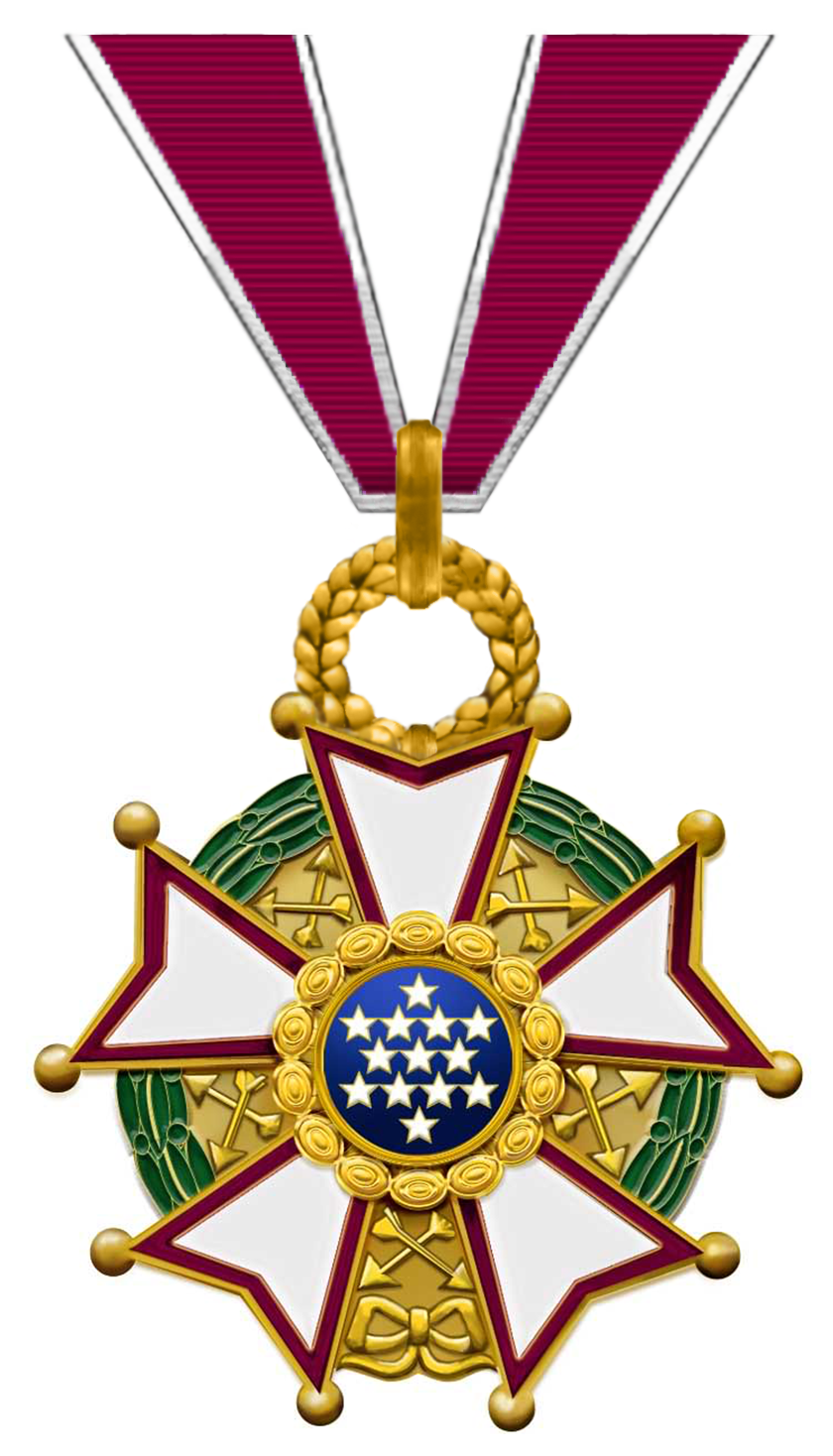
The Legion of Merit, Commander, awarded to General Viên in 1969

Viên was awarded the Legion of Merit, Commander, in December 1969.

=== Vietnamization ===
Viên continued to worry about the prosecution of the war effort. He told the press and his American military advisors that he expected the United States to maintain a force of at least 250,000 troops on the ground for the next several years, and that if the U.S. did not he did not expect South Vietnam to survive. Beginning in 1970, he asked to be relieved as Chief of the JGS and assigned command of the Airborne Brigade, but Thiệu refused each time (wishing to retain the apolitical general in this critical role). As Vietnamization continued, Viên clamped down once more on the American press. He led JGS staff in exercises in determining how much territory ARVN could defend with varying amounts of U.S. aid. He also began planning independent military operations to cope with the effects of Vietnamization. Although General William B. Rosson met with him in April 1970 to warn against it, Viên began planning for ARVN troops to engage in cross-border attacks into Cambodia to strike at Viet Cong and PAVN staging and supply areas. He also reorganized the ARVN command structure, providing for joint command of III and IV Corps while operating inside Cambodia and the establishment of a Cambodian military liaison officer to the JGS.

At a high-level meeting of cabinet officials and generals in October 1970, Viên again sought and won support for a plan (Operation Lam Son 719) to send ARVN troops into Laos to cut the Ho Chi Minh Trail. Viên and Thiệu met with United States Secretary of Defense Melvin R. Laird on January 11, 1971, and proposed their plan. With Laird's tentative approval, Viên met with Abrams and worked out the military details. Viên had proposed an invasion of Laos "countless" times since 1965, making it one of his top strategic goals but the invasion was a disaster. Poor roads, rough terrain and a much higher than expected number of PAVN artillery and machine gun positions (which interdicted airborne resupply efforts) brought the invasion to a halt halfway to its intended target of the city of Tchepone by March 1. A worried Viên met with Abrams, Thiệu and Bunker on March 3 to discuss a change in tactics, and concluded that ARVN airborne forces would make an assault on the abandoned town of Tchepone and occupy it. The assault was successful, and two days later a withdrawal began. The withdrawal turned into an undisciplined, panicked retreat with very heavy losses which was completed on April 6, 1971.

In an example of what he called "pure psywar", Viên also spread rumors that ARVN troops might invade across the Vietnamese Demilitarized Zone and invade North Vietnam (rumors intended to keep three PAVN brigades pinned down there). Viên met with Laird, Chairman of the Joint Chiefs of Staff Admiral Thomas H. Moorer and Commander-in-Chief, Pacific Command (CINCPAC) Admiral John S. McCain, Jr. in November 1971 to discuss the effect of military aid cuts.

Viên's role as Chief of JGS became more advisory after 1971. After the PAVN's success during the early months of the Easter Offensive in March and April 1972—during which the city of Quảng Trị and the provinces of Bình Định and Kon Tum were lost to PAVN forces Thiệu consulted with Viên but continued to personally direct the war without general staff assistance. Viên still believed ARVN capable of defeating the insurgents if his military forces were given enough supplies. As the Easter Offensive ended in October, speculation was rife that the Thiệu government might not be able to survive. Viên was among the individuals who South Vietnamese and American officials felt might be able to form a coalition government with the Viet Cong, if such an action were necessary.

Viên nearly became a signatory to the Paris Peace Accords in 1973. A tentative agreement between the United States and North Vietnam was reached in late October 1972, but Thiệu rejected the accord and demanded 69 changes. Concerned that North Vietnam might pull out of the negotiations altogether and seek to defeat the South Vietnamese, Nixon ordered the heavy aerial bombing (Operation Linebacker II) of North Vietnam in December 1972. Although American losses were light overall and damage in North Vietnam heavy, American public opinion and Congressional anger ran high against the bombing campaign. North Vietnam agreed to return to the bargaining table and Nixon suspended operations against it on December 29, 1972. Nixon offered repeated, private assurances (which did not have the weight of formal diplomatic guarantees) to Thiệu several times during the first two weeks of January, but could not get him to agree to sign the peace document. When Thiệu continued to balk, Nixon told him that he would independently sign the peace accord on January 23 with or without South Vietnamese consent and Thiệu capitulated. By January 22, however, it was unclear if Thiệu would actually send a delegate to Paris to sign the documents. Viên offered to go to Paris to initial the peace agreement without Thiệu's consent, but Nixon vetoed the idea.

Viên was the most senior South Vietnamese official to represent the government as General Frederick C. Weyand and the final contingent of U.S. ground troops left Vietnam on March 29, 1973.

Viên ordered heightened security for the 1974 Tết holiday, and in April 1974 traveled to the United States to plead (unsuccessfully) for more military aid. He was appointed a member of the Presidential Military Council in 1975 along with generals Trần Thiện Khiêm and Dạng Văn Quảng. He also promoted Lt. Gen. Đổng Văn Khuyên, a close friend and Commander of the Central Logistics Command, to act concurrently as Chief of Staff of the JGS. In the opinion of Major General Homer D. Smith, the U.S. Defense Attaché, Khuyên's appointment enhanced operations and personnel operations while diminishing the managerial efficiency of logistics and creating jealousy among other military commanders.

=== Role during government's final days ===
Viên was present at the fateful meeting in March 1975 which led to South Vietnam's collapse. At the end of February 1975, Thiệu (accompanied by Viên and Prime Minister Gen. Trần Thiện Khiêm) made a brief visit to Cam Ranh Bay to assess the military situation in South Vietnam's northernmost military zone. At an assembly of top generals on March 11, 1975, Thiệu declared he would abandon the Central Highlands, trading land in order to achieve a more defensible concentration of population and troops around Saigon and the Mekong Delta. Although he had believed consolidation was necessary for some time, Viên had never voiced his concern. He finally did so at this meeting. Yet, Viên also privately believed that the war was unwinnable if the Central Highlands were abandoned. Accounts of this meeting differ, however. Some versions have Viên remaining silent regarding Thieu's consolidation decision. Whichever version is correct, the government did not prepare the army, its allies, or the public for the decision, nor did it anticipate how the decision might affect the war effort. Although Viên met with Smith shortly after the March 11 meeting, he did not inform him about Thiệu's decision—leaving the Americans unprepared for what followed. Thiệu's decision led to widespread panic among the public, and the collapse of the ARVN as they sought to protect their families. As panic set in and ARVN troops refused to fight or deserted in large numbers, Viên tried to rally his nation's troops: "We have only one way and that is to fight for our survival. The historic hour has come." Privately he expressed his belief that the Thiệu government could no longer prosecute the war effort effectively. Viên, Thiệu, Vice President Trần Văn Hương and Prime Minister Gen. Trần Thiện Khiêm consulted with General Weyand (visiting South Vietnam on a fact-finding mission) on April 1. Also present were U.S. Ambassador Graham Martin and Smith. Weyand delivered a personal message from President Gerald Ford indicating that limited amounts of critical supplies and equipment were coming, but that the ARVN had to hold its ground.

Viên met with General Trần Văn Đôn, the new South Vietnamese Defense Minister, on April 16 and advised him that ARVN troops would no longer fight. To Australian Army Brigadier Ted Serong, this was a sign that Viên himself was abandoning the fight but Smith felt that Viên and the JGS staff were working very hard to reconstitute forces which had fled and wanted to continue to fight. On April 21, Viên issued a statement that said he would not resign and intended to stay and fight. On April 27, Viên helped brief members of the National Assembly on what was likely to happen once the city fell. Kỳ later said he called Viên on April 27 and offered to lead a tank column so that they could open the road to the west and help tens of thousands of people flee the city, but Viên dissuaded him. Viên's next actions are unclear. Some accounts say that Viên then resigned, telling President Trần Văn Hương that he could not serve under Dương Văn Minh (who had returned to the country in 1968 and would be named president on April 27). But other versions of the fall of Saigon have Viên leaving Vietnam on April 28 without resigning, leaving the JGS in turmoil.

Saigon fell to PAVN forces on April 30, 1975.

== Assessment ==
Assessments of Cao Văn Viên's military career are generally positive. In his memoir, A Soldier Reports, General Westmoreland concluded, "Never have I known a more admirable man: honest, loyal, reserved, scholarly, diplomatic." Historians have said his strategic and command skills compared favorably with those of American General Earle G. Wheeler, and that General Abrams respected Viên deeply. Smith said, "I was most impressed with this gentleman. Our relationship was one of complete candor on the matters he chose to discuss. ... I never heard him say an unkind thing about anyone. Despite the obvious facts of too little support and the failing prospects of getting more support, he was never bitter. He was a very gracious person." In a top secret report in July 1970, Colonel John K. Singlaub said he had "a very warm personal working relationship" with Viên, and described the general as a "major factor in getting things done".

There are some critics, however. General Lâm Quang Thi called him a "colorless" man who preferred practicing yoga over leading troops. Los Angeles Times reporter George McArthur called him "something of a prima donna." Nguyễn Tiến Hưng described him as "a mediocre staff officer, without imagination."

== Post-war life ==
Cao Văn Viên left South Vietnam for the United States on April 28, 1975. He arrived in the U.S. on April 29, 1975, aboard a C-141 Starlifter aircraft which landed at El Toro Marine Air Station. He was met by Marine Brigadier General R. W. Taylor and taken to an undisclosed location before being reunited with his family. The Viên family had strong ties to the U.S. already: In 1973, Viên's oldest son was a doctoral student at American University and his second-oldest son was attending high school in Washington, D.C.

The Viên family settled briefly in New Jersey, where his wife Tran Thi Tao ran a dry cleaning business. The Viên family then moved to Falls Church, Virginia, His wife started an export-import business. For a time, Viên was paid $1,500 a month by the U.S. Army to write monographs about the conduct of the Vietnam War. His most comprehensive analysis was The Final Collapse, in which he argued that cutbacks in military assistance and a lack of U.S. air power led to the defeat of the South Vietnamese government. After finishing his work for the U.S. Army, Viên considered teaching French literature, but he suffered from rheumatoid arthritis and was unable to work. Viên was a lifelong adherent of Buddhism; fluent in English, French and Laotian; never smoked tobacco or drank alcohol; and loved birds. He became an American citizen in 1982. He kept bees and allowed them to sting him to dull the pain of his arthritis, but this unorthodox remedy was only temporarily effective.

Viên's wife died in 1991. His daughter, Lan Cao, became a professor of law at the College of William and Mary. His son Cao Anh Tuan died in 1996, and his son Cao Anh Dzung disappeared and has never been found. Viên lived his last years at Sleepy Hollow Manor, an assisted living facility in Annandale, Virginia. He died there of cardiac arrest on January 22, 2008. He was survived by his daughter and five grandchildren.

=== Controversy over wealth ===
At the time that he left South Vietnam, the American press believed that Viên was one of the wealthiest generals able to escape the country. The Los Angeles Times reported that "repeated American complaints" had prevented Viên himself from accumulating wealth or engaging in corruption.

Viên's wife, Tao Thi Tran, was the daughter of one of the largest landowners in the Mekong Delta. Her father was executed by the Viet Cong and her family's land confiscated. A savvy businesswoman, she built a large number of businesses while her husband was in the military. She owned and ran bars and hotels that catered to U.S. military personnel and diplomats, as well as a number of other businesses at different times including a Pepsi-Cola bottling franchise, a San Miguel beer distributorship, and a construction company that built approximately 20 to 30 homes each year. She also owned extensive tracts of land, and, for a time after moving to the US, she ran an import-export business which specialized in Vietnamese handicrafts. She was also said to sell favors and military and political promotions.

Accusations were also frequently made that Viên's wife had enriched the family due to her husband's position, although there was almost no evidence to support such claims. In September 1970, a member of the National Assembly accused Viên of extensive corruption. After the fall of Saigon, Nguyễn Văn Ngái (a former Minister of Rural Development and former Senator in the National Assembly) also accused the Viêns of corruption. Another unsubstantiated claim was that the Viêns had deposited $1 million in a bank in Guam during their flight from South Vietnam.

== Other awards ==
In addition to his National Order of Vietnam, Silver Star, and Legion of Merit, General Viên was awarded eight other medals from the governments of the Philippines, Taiwan, South Korea, and Thailand. He also received the following honors from the Republic of Vietnam as of 1967:

=== National honours ===
- Grand Officer of the National Order of Vietnam
- Army Distinguished Service Order, First Class
- Air Force Distinguished Service Order, First Class
- Navy Distinguished Service Order, First Class
- Army Meritorious Service Medal
- Gallantry Crosses (12 citations: eight with palm, two with silver star, two with brass star)
- Air Gallantry Medal (Golden Wing)
- Hazardous Service Medal
- Staff Service Medal, First Class
- Civil Actions Medal, First Class
- Vietnam Campaign Medal
- Chuong My Medal, First Class

=== Foreign honours ===
- USA :
  - Silver Star Medal
  - Commander of the Legion of Merit
- Thailand :
  - Knight Grand Cross of the Order of the White Elephant
  - Knight Grand Cross of the Order of the Crown of Thailand
- Philippines :
  - Chief Commander of the Legion of Honor
- Taiwan :
  - Grand Cordon of the Order of the Cloud and Banner
- France :
  - Croix de guerre des théâtres d'opérations extérieures
