= Operation Benton =

Part of the Vietnam War (1967)

- Part of the Vietnam War
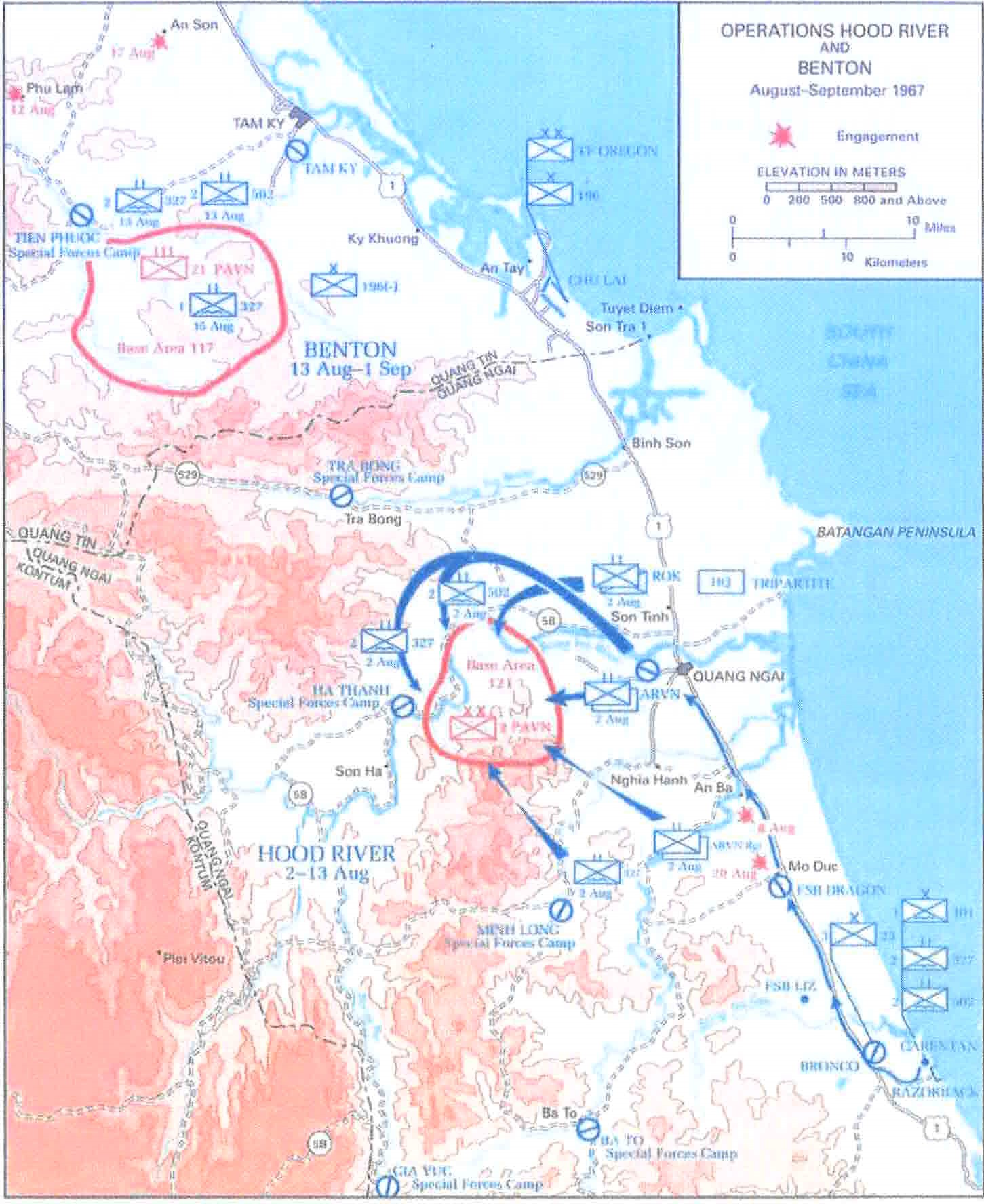
- Operations Hood River and Benton, August–September 1967
Date	13–29 August 1967
Location	Quảng Tín Province (now Quang Nam Province, South Vietnam
Result	U.S. operational success

Belligerents
United States	North Vietnam

Commanders and leaders
MG Richard T. Knowles	

Units involved
1st Brigade, 101st Airborne Division	21st Regiment

Casualties and losses
45 killed	(Viet Cong) 503 killed and 132 weapons recovered

Operation Benton was an operation conducted by the 1st Brigade, 101st Airborne Division in Quảng Tín Province, lasting from 13 to 29 August 1967.

== Background ==
U.S. intelligence placed the People's Army of Vietnam (PAVN) 21st Regiment in Base Area 117, west of Chu Lai Base Area in southern Quảng Tín Province, where it was believed to be protecting elements of the PAVN 368th Artillery Regiment, thought to be preparing rocket attacks on Allied bases. Task Force Oregon commander Major general Richard T. Knowles initially planned for the 196th Light Infantry Brigade to sweep the eastern portion of Base Area 117.

On 12 August, a PAVN force believed to be from the 21st Regiment attacked an Army of the Republic of Vietnam (ARVN) Ranger Battalion 10 km north of Base Area 117. Knowles thought that the unit would move south into the Base Area and ordered two battalions to intercept it.

== Operation ==
On the morning of 13 August, the 2nd Battalion, 327th Infantry Regiment and the 2nd Battalion, 502nd Infantry Regiment deployed by helicopter into Base Area 117 and began moving north. That night a PAVN unit hit the 2/327th night position with grenades and automatic weapons fire killing one. Meanwhile, a company from 2/502nd had been sent south to reconnoiter the Base Area and was attacked by a PAVN force in its night defensive position. Despite artillery and AC-47 fire the PAVN continued their assault for two hours before withdrawing, leaving 35 dead and 18 weapons, while U.S. losses were five killed.

On 15 August, 1/327th Infantry was committed to the operation to search the southern area, making sporadic contact with PAVN units, usually in the late afternoon so that the air and artillery support was less effective and they could withdraw under the cover of darkness.

Despite up to five battalions being used in sweeping Base Area 117 and the area to the north, the units were unable to locate the 21st Regiment. In the sweep they captured 132 weapons, two large ammunition caches containing mortar and recoilless rifle rounds and destroyed a large training facility including barracks and a hospital. The PAVN meanwhile managed to shoot down five UH-1 helicopters.

== Aftermath ==
Operation Benton officially concluded on 29 August, with the US claiming that PAVN losses were 503 killed, U.S. losses were 45 killed.
