= Army of Vietnam =

Army of Vietnam can mean any of the following:

- Vietnamese National Army, State of Vietnam (1949-1955)
- Army of the Republic of Vietnam, South Vietnam (1955-1975)
- People's Army of Vietnam, Democratic Republic of Vietnam (1945-1976), Socialist Republic of Vietnam (1976 - current)
