= Lê Văn Tỵ =

South Vietnamese general (1904–1964)

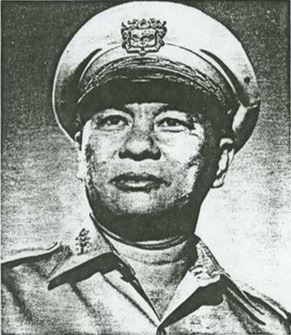

2nd State Counsellor of South Vietnam
- (Military junta)
- In office 12 November 1963 – 1 February 1964
- President: Dương Văn Minh
- Prime Minister: Nguyễn Ngọc Thơ
- Preceded by: Ngô Đình Nhu
- Succeeded by: Position abolished

Chief of the Joint General Staff of the Republic of Vietnam Military Forces
- In office 29 November 1954 – December 1962
- Preceded by: Nguyễn Văn Hinh
- Succeeded by: Trần Thiện Khiêm

Personal details
- Born: May 17, 1904 Thắng Nhì, Vũng Tàu, French Indochina
- Died: October 20, 1964 (aged 60) Saigon, Republic of Vietnam
- Children: 3 (plus one adopted daughter)

Military service
- Allegiance: France; State of Vietnam; South Vietnam
- Branch/service: French Army; Vietnamese National Army; Army of the Republic of Vietnam
- Years of service: 1922–1964
- Rank: Marshal (Thống Tướng)

Army General Lê Văn Tỵ (17 May 1904 – 20 October 1964) was the first chief of staff of the Army of the Republic of Vietnam. He replaced Nguyễn Văn Hinh as Chief of the Joint General Staff. He was previously a general in the Vietnamese National Army of the State of Vietnam, which became the Republic of Vietnam in 1955 after Prime Minister Ngô Đình Diệm deposed Emperor Bảo Đại in a fraudulent referendum. He is the only general to be promoted to the Marshal.

During the First Indochina War, he was appointed brigadier general in the Vietnamese National Army.

Tỵ's deteriorating health forced him to retire in 1964. He succumbed to cancer in 1964. He was a recipient of the National Order of Vietnam.

He is also the only General of the Republic of Vietnam to be promoted to the 5-star rank of Army General.
