= Salve H. Matheson =

United States Army general (1920–2005)

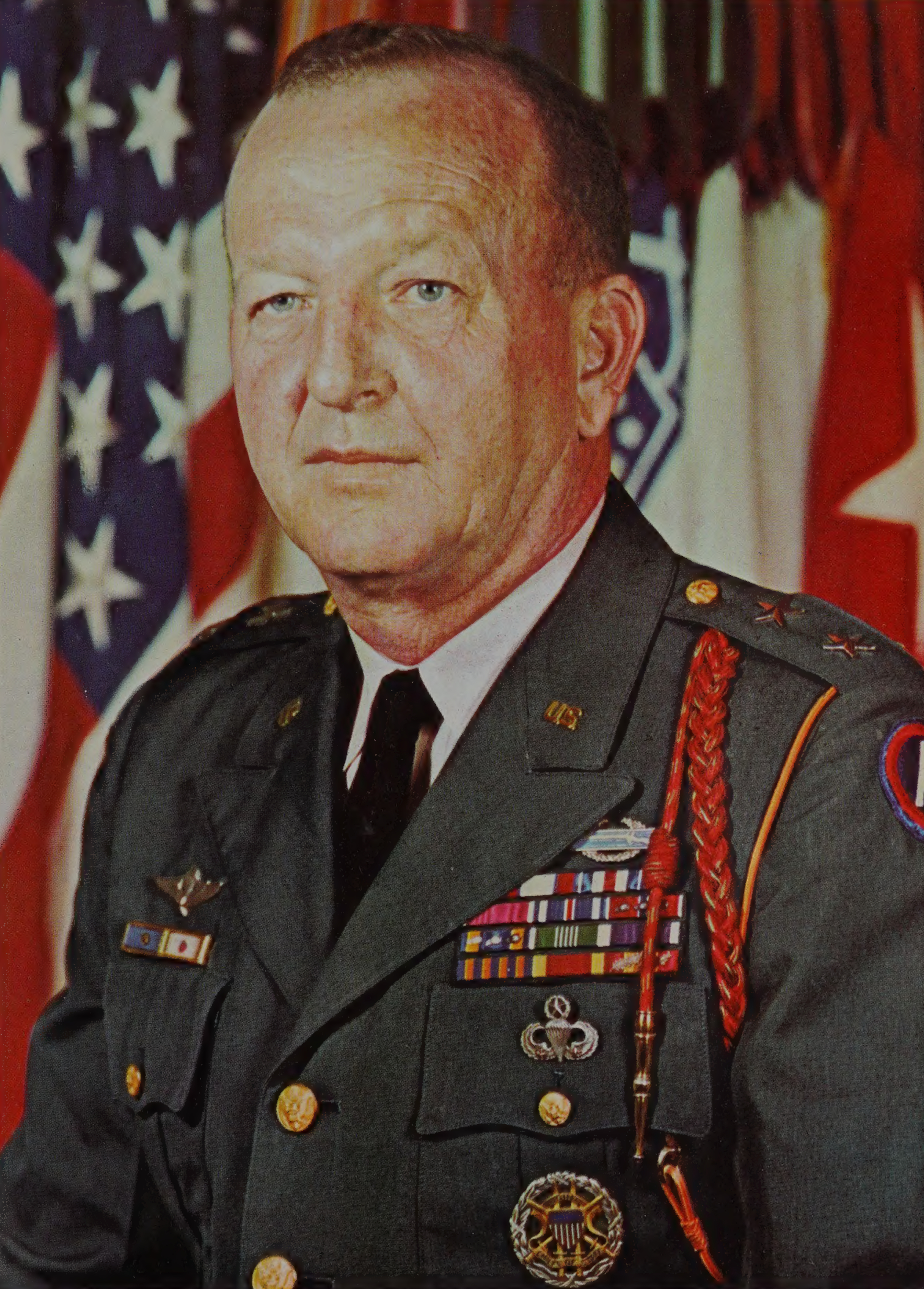
- Matheson as Commanding General of Fort Campbell c. 1970
- Born: 11 August 1920; Seattle, Washington, United States
- Died: 8 January 2005 (aged 84); Carmel, California, United States
- Burial place: Arlington National Cemetery, Virginia, United States
- Spouse: Patricia H. Matheson (m. 1947)
- Military career
- Allegiance: United States
- Branch: United States Army
- Service years: 1942–1975
- Rank: Major General
- Commands: 2nd Infantry Division; 101st Airborne Division
- Conflicts: World War II; Operation Overlord; Operation Market Garden; Battle of the Bulge; Korean War; Battle of Inchon; Operation Wonsan; Hungnam evacuation; Vietnam War; Operation Benton; Operations Malheur I and Malheur II
- Awards: Army Distinguished Service Medal (2); Silver Star; Legion of Merit; Distinguished Flying Cross; Bronze Star Medal (4); Purple Heart

Salve Hugo Matheson (11 August 1920 – 8 January 2005) was a general officer in the United States Army who served in World War II, the Korean War, and the Vietnam War.

== Early life and education ==
Salve H. Matheson was born on 11 August 1920 to S. E. Matheson and Elsa Matheson in Seattle, Washington; he was the second of four children. Shortly after Salve's birth, the Matheson Family moved to the Monterey Peninsula where Matheson grew up and attended school. Matheson was commissioned in 1942 through the Reserve Officers' Training Corps program at the University of California, Los Angeles, of which he was a 1942 graduate with a Bachelor of Arts degree in Liberal Arts.

== Military career ==
Matheson served in the 506th Parachute Infantry Regiment in the U.S. and in Europe during World War II. The regiment gained later international recognition following the publication of Stephen Ambrose's book Band of Brothers. Major Richard "Dick" Winters, who was celebrated in the Tom Hanks-produced HBO miniseries based on Ambrose's book, said of Salve Matheson, "No veteran who served in Easy Company had a more distinguished military career."

Matheson began his assignment with the regiment in E Company as a platoon leader and was soon moved to the 2nd Battalion staff. He was transferred to the regimental staff before the D-Day invasions. Several days after drop, Matheson was wounded by German mortar fire while organizing a machine gun assault in French hedgerows on June 13, 1944. On June 15 he was awarded the Combat Infantryman Badge. After recovering from his injuries he parachuted into Holland and was later awarded the Bronze Service Arrowhead for participating in Operation Market Garden. Matheson was besieged with the rest of the 101st Airborne under the command of Maj. Gen. Anthony McAuliffe at Bastogne. During the Battle of the Bulge he was assigned as the S-4 of the 506th PIR and attempted without success to find small arms ammunition for his unit. Matheson served as the regimental logistics officer until March 1945, when he was moved to the position of Operations officer. Lt. Matheson helped lead the vanguard of the 101st toward Berchtesgarden and secured the surrenders of General Hans Speidel and Field Marshal Albert Kesselring.

In 1949, Harry W. O. Kinnard, then a lieutenant colonel, and Matheson, then a major, served as technical advisers on the movie Battleground.

During the Korean War, Matheson was assigned to the 18th Airborne Corps and the 1st Infantry Division. He was involved in amphibious landings at Inchon, South Korea and Wonsan, North Korea and in the amphibious withdrawal from Hungnam, North Korea. In early 1951, Matheson, then a major, was awarded the third oak leaf cluster to his Bronze Star by Headquarters, X Corps, after he had been reassigned to Washington, D.C.

In January 1954, Matheson, a lieutenant colonel, was assigned as assistant chief of staff, G3 of the 1st Infantry Division in U.S. Army, Europe (USAREUR); he had previously been assigned to the research and development division of USAREUR. He was reassigned from the 1st Infantry Division in September 1955.

During the height of the Cold War, Matheson commanded the 10th Special Forces Group (Airborne), Bad Tölz, Federal Republic of Germany, from 1961 to 1963.

In December 1965, Matheson was selected for promotion to brigadier general. In mid-April 1966, Matheson, still a colonel, who had previously been assigned to the Office of the Joint Chiefs of Staff, assumed duty as the 101st Airborne Division's assistant commander for supporting units at Fort Campbell, Kentucky. Matheson became the commander of the 1st Brigade, 101st Airborne Division in March 1966. From late January 1967 to 1968, Matheson, who came to be known by his men as "The Iron Duke," commanded the 1st Brigade, 101st Airborne Division. He commanded extensive "search and destroy" operations against the Viet Cong and North Vietnamese Army Regulars, including Operation Hood River. He established a camp near Duc Pho, Republic of Vietnam, which he named CARENTAN. In January 1968, he was assigned as the Senior U.S. Army adviser to the I Corps Tactical Zone

In April 1968, Matheson assumed duties as Director, ROTC-National Defense Cadet Corps at Fort Monroe, Virginia after leaving his command of the 1st Brigade, 101st Airborne Division in Vietnam. In July 1968, Matheson was selected for promotion to major general. In 1968, he assumed command of the 101st Airborne Division.

In the fall of 1970, Matheson was reassigned from his position as Commander, 2nd Infantry Division in South Korea to the Inter-American Defense Board in Washington, D.C.

== Military awards ==
Matheson's decorations include the Army Distinguished Service Medal with Oak Leaf Cluster, the Silver Star, the Legion of Merit, the Distinguished Flying Cross, Bronze Star Medal with three Oak Leaf Clusters (fourth award), twelve Air Medals, the Army Commendation Medal, the Purple Heart, Master Parachutist Badge (with two combat stars), and Combat Infantry Badge. He also earned campaign medals for the American Defense Campaign, European-African-Middle Eastern Campaign (with arrowhead device and three stars), World War II Victory Medal, Korean Service Medal (with arrowhead device and three stars), the Vietnam Service Medal (with three stars), the United Nations Korean Service Medal and the Republic of Vietnam Campaign Medal. He also was eligible to wear two Presidential Unit Citations and a Republic of Korea Presidential Unit Citation. Foreign awards include the Bronze Lion and the Orange Lanyard of the Netherlands.

== Family ==
Matheson's engagement to Patricia Halloran was announced by her parents, Colonel and Mrs. Michael E. Halloran, on 20 September 1947. They married later that year and honeymooned in Carmel, California. They had three children. Matheson's older brother, Martin "Big Whitey" Matheson was a lieutenant in the U.S. Army and a stunt man in Hollywood who acted as Ward Bond's stunt double.

== Later life and death ==
After retiring from the Army in 1975, Matheson and his wife Patricia retired to Carmel, California. He died on 8 January 2005 in Carmel, California, survived by his wife and three children. He was buried at Arlington National Cemetery with his spouse, Patricia H.
