= Nguyễn Văn Hinh =

Vietnamese National Army Chief of Staff

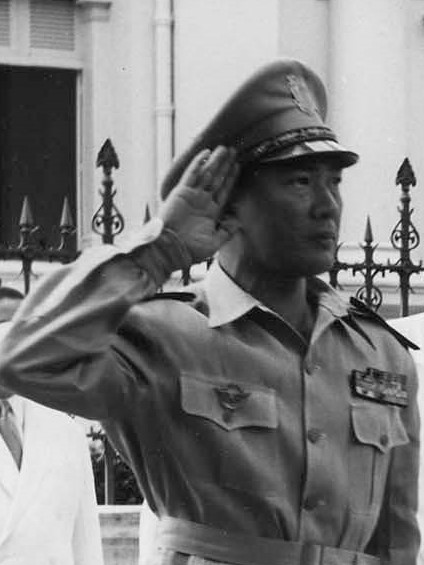
- Hinh in 1954

Chief of General Staff of the Vietnamese National Army
- In office March 1952 – 29 November 1954
- Preceded by: Position established
- Succeeded by: Lê Văn Tỵ

Deputy Chief of Staff of the French Air Force
- In office 1962–1968
- Chief of Staff: André Martin

Personal details
- Born: 20 September 1915 Vũng Tàu, Bà Rịa–Vũng Tàu, French Indochina
- Died: 26 June 2004 (aged 88) Suresnes, Île-de-France, France
- Relations: Nguyễn Văn Tâm (father); Jonathan Van-Tam (nephew)
- Awards: Legion of Honour (France); National Order of Merit (France); Military Medal (France); War Cross (1939–1945) (France); National Order (South Vietnam); Gallantry Cross (South Vietnam); Air Medal (United States)

Military service
- Allegiance: France; State of Vietnam
- Branch/service: (France) French Armed Forces; Vietnamese National Army
- Years of service: (France) FAF: 1936–1948; 1954–1975; VNA: 1949–1954
- Rank: Lieutenant general
- Unit: (France) French Air Force (France) Colonial troops General staff
- Battles/wars: World War II; First Indochina War; Algerian War

Nguyễn Văn Hinh (20 September 1915 – 26 June 2004) was the inaugural chief of staff of the Vietnamese National Army and the first Vietnamese officer in the French Armed Forces to be promoted to the rank of general. Educated in the French style, he served in the French Air Force and the Troupes coloniales before accepting a role in the army of the new State of Vietnam within the French Union. Hinh is somewhat of an oddity in the 20th century military history of Vietnam as he attained the rank of lieutenant general in two separate countries, not unlike his North Vietnamese counterpart Nguyễn Sơn who served as a major general in both the People's Army of Vietnam and the People's Liberation Army of China.

== Biography ==
Nguyễn Văn Hinh was born on 20 September 1915 in Vũng Tàu, Bà Rịa–Vũng Tàu province as the son of Nguyễn Văn Tâm, a schoolteacher and aspiring functionary in French Cochinchina. Their family name was originally Trương before becoming Nguyễn. After his primary education and at his father's insistence, Hinh moved to France in 1932 to advance his studies, attending the prestigious Lycée Louis-le-Grand in Paris.

=== Early career ===
In 1936, he enlisted in the French Air Force and was sent to the École de l'air in Salon-de-Provence for training. Hinh graduated as pilot and flight engineer in 1937 and was assigned to a bomber squadron in Toulouse, achieving the rank of second lieutenant. With the outbreak of World War II and the invasion of France in 1940, he participated in operations against invading Germans in the northeastern part of the country and Italians in the Alps. Though the French government eventually capitulated, Hinh was awarded the Croix de Guerre for his contribution to the war effort. Following the establishment of a collaborationist regime under Philippe Pétain in Vichy, Hinh was transferred to West Africa, serving in French Sudan and Senegal.

Upon the conclusion of Operation Torch in November 1942, he joined Charles de Gaulle's Free French Forces as a first lieutenant. Hinh worked as an air force instructor in Marrakesh until April 1944, when he was reassigned to the European theater in charge of a bomber squadron. At the end of the war, he was admitted to the Legion of Honour and awarded the American Air Medal for his service. For a year after the war, Hinh remained in occupied Germany. Promoted to the rank of major in 1948, he was sent to lead a transport wing in Algeria, where he would meet his future wife, the daughter of a local pied-noir.

=== Vietnamese National Army ===
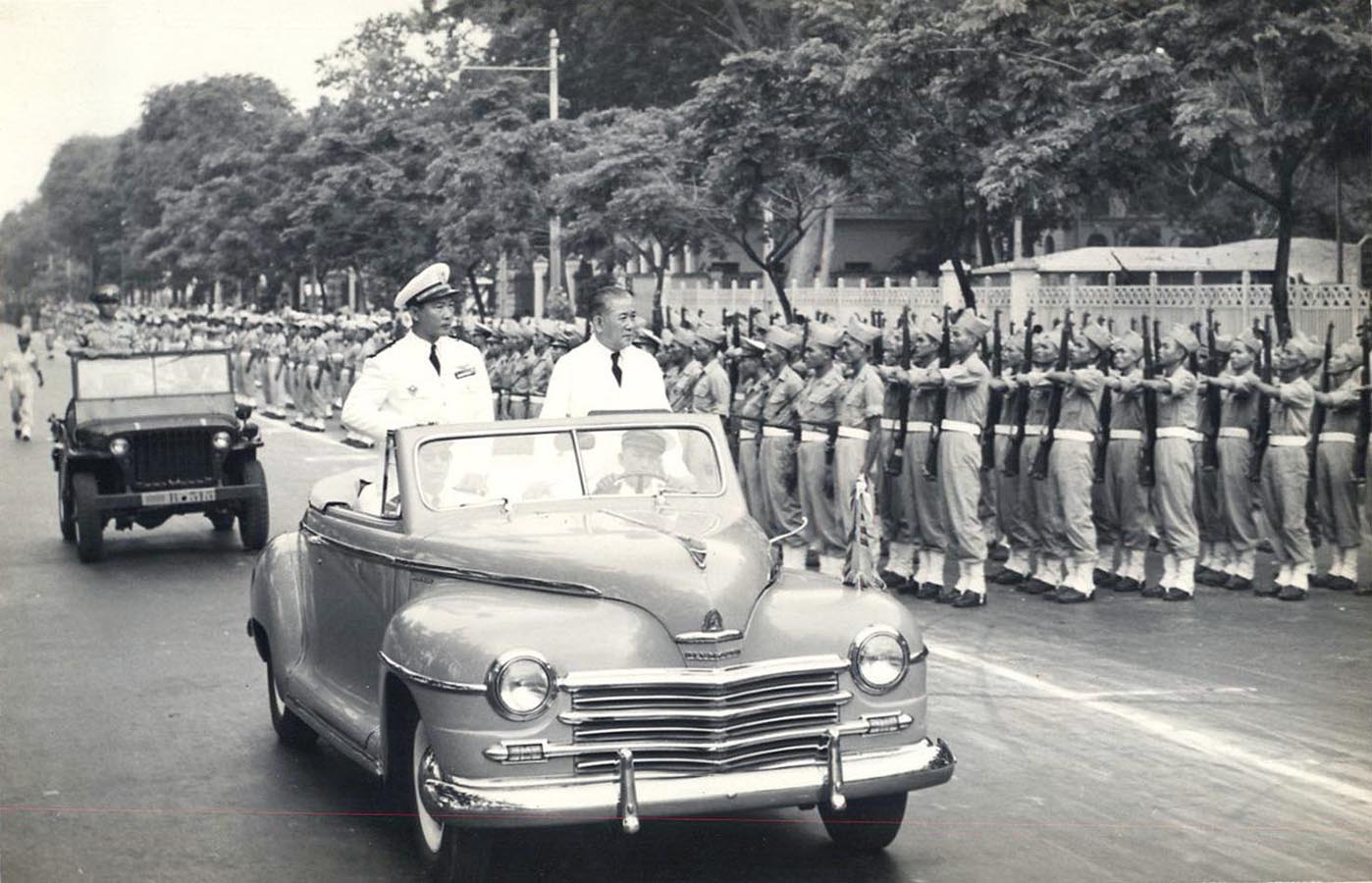
Hinh (left) and Prime Minister Trần Văn Hữu on parade in Saigon, 1951

Nguyễn Văn Hinh was appointed the Vietnamese National Army Chief of General Staff by Emperor Bảo Đại.

==== Opposition to Ngô Đình Diệm and exile ====
Hinh was replaced by General Lê Văn Tỵ as appointed Chief of the nascent Joint General Staff.

=== Later life ===
Hinh returned to France in November 1954, re-entering the air force with his former rank of lieutenant colonel. For his service in Vietnam, he was admitted to the National Order of Vietnam and awarded the Vietnam Gallantry Cross. As a senior colonel, Hinh was appointed to the flight test centre in Brétigny-sur-Orge in 1956, followed by an assignment to the missile test centre in Biscarrosse. In 1960, he received command of the airbase at Colomb-Béchar in support of the Algerian War effort. Having avoided involvement in the 1961 Generals' putsch, Hinh was promoted to the rank of brigadier general the following year and appointed Deputy Chief of Staff of the Air Force. In 1965, he was promoted to divisional general and assigned to the Central Directorate of Matériel of the Air Force, overseeing the introduction of new nuclear strike capabilities. As is customary for French military personnel reaching the age of 55, Hinh was scrapped from the flight roster in 1970 and entered the reserves until his retirement in 1975.

After the 1975 spring offensive and the dissolution of South Vietnam, he devoted the following years to helping his former VNA subordinates escape the country and find refuge in France.

Hinh died on 26 June 2004, aged 88, a few years after his admission to the Ordre national du Mérite.

== Awards ==
- France:
  - Commander of the Legion of Honour
  - Grand Cross of the National Order of Merit
  - Military Medal
  - War Cross (1939–1945)
- South Vietnam:
  - Grand Cross of the National Order of Vietnam
  - Gallantry Cross with palm
- United States:
  - Air Medal

== See also ==
- State of Vietnam
- Vietnamese National Army
- First Indochina War
