= Chief of the Joint General Staff (South Vietnam) =

Highest ranking military officer in the Republic of Vietnam Armed Forces

- Tổng Tham mưu trưởng (Vietnamese)
- Emblem for the Joint General Staff

- Flag of the Joint General Staff

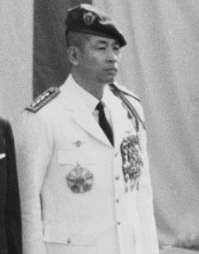
- Longest serving Cao Văn Viên; 1 October 1965 – 26 April 1975
- Ministry of Defense
- Status: Abolished
- Member of: Republic of Vietnam Military Forces
- Reports to: Minister of National Defense
- Residence: Camp Trần Hưng Đạo
- Seat: Joint General Staff
- Appointer: President of South Vietnam
- Formation: March 1952
- First holder: Nguyễn Văn Hinh
- Final holder: Nguyễn Hữu Hạnh
- Abolished: 30 April 1975

The Chief of the Joint General Staff (Vietnamese: Tổng Tham mưu trưởng) was the highest-ranking military officer of in the Republic of Vietnam Military Forces, who was responsible for maintaining the operational command of the military and its three major branches.

== History ==
The position was established with the creation of the General Staff of the Vietnamese National Army, in 1952. Following Vietnam's division and later the State of Vietnam becoming the Republic of Vietnam on 26 October 1955, the title was changed to Chief of the Joint General Staff.

== List of chiefs ==
=== Vietnamese National Army ===
| No. | Portrait | Name | Took office | Left office | Time in office | Ref. |
|---|---|---|---|---|---|---|
| 1 | Nguyễn Văn Hinh | Lieutenant General; Nguyễn Văn Hinh (1915–2004) | March 1952 | 29 November 1954 | 2 years, 8 months | |
| 2 | Lê Văn Tỵ | Lieutenant General; Lê Văn Tỵ (1903–1964) | 29 November 1954 | 23 March 1958 | 3 years, 3 months | |

=== Republic of Vietnam Military Forces ===
| No. | Portrait | Name | Took office | Left office | Time in office | Ref. |
|---|---|---|---|---|---|---|
| 1 | Lê Văn Tỵ | Army General; Lê Văn Tỵ (1903–1964) | 23 March 1958 | December 1962 | 4 years, 8 months | . |
| - | Trần Thiện Khiêm | Lieutenant General; Trần Thiện Khiêm (1925–2021); Acting | December 1962 | August 1963 | 8 months | |
| 2 | Trần Văn Đôn | Lieutenant General; Trần Văn Đôn (1917–1998) | August 1963 | 10 January 1964 | 5 months | |
| 3 | Nguyễn Khánh | Lieutenant General; Nguyễn Khánh (1927–2013) | January 1964 | February 1964 | 5 months | . |
| 4 | Trần Thiện Khiêm | Lieutenant General; Trần Thiện Khiêm (1925–2021) | February 1964 | October 1964 | 8 months | . |
| (3) | Nguyễn Khánh | Lieutenant General; Nguyễn Khánh (1927–2013) | October 1964 | February 1965 | 4 months | . |
| 5 | Trần Văn Minh | Lieutenant General; Trần Văn Minh (1923–2009) | February 1965 | July 1965 | 5 months | |
| 6 | Nguyễn Hữu Có | Lieutenant General; Nguyễn Hữu Có (1925–2012) | July 1965 | October 1965 | 3 months | . |
| 7 | Cao Văn Viên | General; Cao Văn Viên (1921–2008) | 1 October 1965 | 26 April 1975 | 9 years, 207 days | |
| 8 | Đồng Văn Khuyên [vi] | Lieutenant General; Đồng Văn Khuyên (1927–2015) | 27 April 1975 | 28 April 1975 | 1 day | . |
| 9 | Nguyễn Phước Vĩnh Lộc | Lieutenant General; Nguyễn Phước Vĩnh Lộc (1923–2009) | 29 April 1975 | 29 April 1975 | 0 days | . |
| 10 | Nguyễn Hữu Hạnh | Brigadier General; Nguyễn Hữu Hạnh (1926–2019) | 30 April 1975 | 30 April 1975 | 0 days | . |
