= Richard T. Knowles =

United States Army general

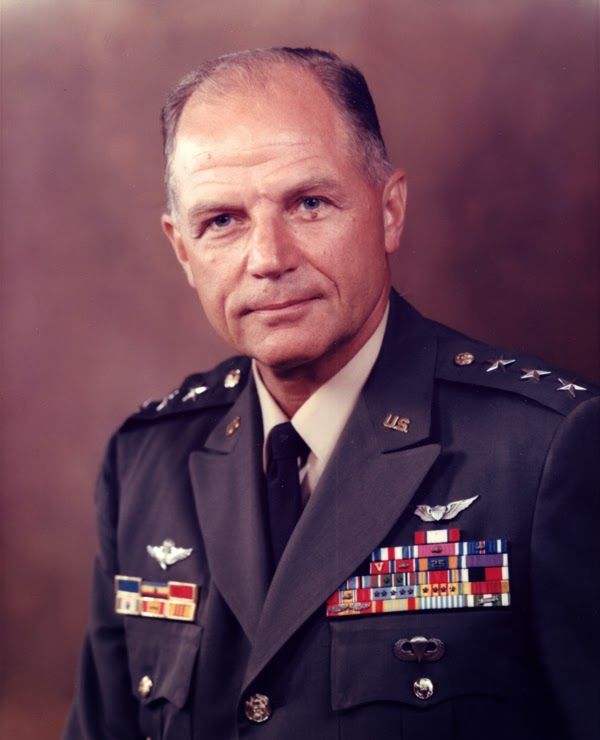
- Born: December 20, 1916; Chicago, Illinois
- Died: September 18, 2013 (aged 96); Roswell, New Mexico
- Burial place: Arlington National Cemetery
- Military career
- Allegiance: United States
- Branch: United States Army
- Service years: 1942–1974
- Rank: Lieutenant General
- Nickname: Dick
- Commands: I Corps; Task Force Oregon; 196th Light Infantry Brigade
- Conflicts: World War II; Korean War; Vietnam War
- Awards: Army Distinguished Service Medal; Silver Star; Legion of Merit (2); Distinguished Flying Cross (2); Bronze Star Medal (2); Purple Heart

Richard Thomas Knowles (December 20, 1916 – September 18, 2013) was a United States Army lieutenant general, who served as assistant commander of the 1st Cavalry Division and as commander of the 196th Light Infantry Brigade and Task Force Oregon during the Vietnam War.

== Early life and education ==
Knowles was born on 20 December 1916 in Chicago.

Knowles attended the University of Illinois and joined the ROTC program there.

== Military service ==
Knowles joined the United States Army in 1942 and took part in the Normandy Landings.

=== Korean War ===
Knowles took part in the Inchon Landings and was later awarded the Silver Star.

On 10 February 1964, Knowles was named as acting assistant division commander of the 11th Air Assault Division and nominated for promotion to brigadier general.

=== Vietnam War ===
Knowles served as assistant division commander of the 1st Cavalry Division in 1965 during which time he supported the relief of the Siege of Plei Me.

Knowles served as commander of the 196th Light Infantry Brigade. In July 1967, MG Knowles assumed command of Task Force Oregon into which the 196th was subsumed.

=== Post-Vietnam ===
Knowles served as commander of I Corps from 1 August 1972 to 17 July 1973. He retired from the army in 1974.

== Later career ==
Knowles served as a Republican representative in the New Mexico State legislature for 16 years from 1983 to 1998.

He died on 18 September 2013 at his home in Roswell, New Mexico and was buried at Arlington National Cemetery.
