= Vietnamese National Army =

Military of the France-associated State of Vietnam regime

- Quân đội Quốc gia Việt Nam (Vietnamese)
- Flag of the Vietnamese National Army
- Founded: 1950
- Disbanded: 1955

Leadership
- Chief of State: See list
- Chief of the General Staff: See list

Personnel
- Active personnel: As of July 1954: 167,700 men; 37,800 auxiliaries; Total: 205,500

Related articles
- History: First Indochina War (1950–1954); Battle of Saigon (1955)

The Vietnamese National Army (VNA; Vietnamese: Quân đội Quốc gia Việt Nam, lit. 'Military of the State (or Nation) of Vietnam', chữ Hán: 軍隊國家越南; French: Armée Nationale Vietnamienne, lit. 'Vietnamese National Army') was a State of Vietnam's military force officially created on 8 December 1950, after the Élysée Accords took effect on 14 June 1949 when Vietnam was recognized by France as an associated state within the French Union ruled by Emperor Bảo Đại. It was commanded by Vietnamese General Nguyễn Văn Hinh and was loyal to Bảo Đại. The VNA fought in joint operations with the French Union's French Far East Expeditionary Corps (CEFEO) against the communist Việt Minh forces led by Ho Chi Minh and Võ Nguyên Giáp. Different units within the VNA fought in a wide range of campaigns including the Battle of Nà Sản (1952), Operation Hautes Alpes (1953), Operation Atlas (1953) and the Battle of Dien Bien Phu (1954).

It should not be confused with the opposing communist-led military force which has once adopted the synonymous name National Army of Vietnam (also Quân đội Quốc gia Việt Nam) in about the same period but then soon renamed itself as the People's Army of Vietnam. With the departure of the French Far East Expeditionary Corps from Indochina in 1956, the VNA was reorganized as the Republic of Vietnam Military Forces of South Vietnam.

== Operations (1949–1955) ==
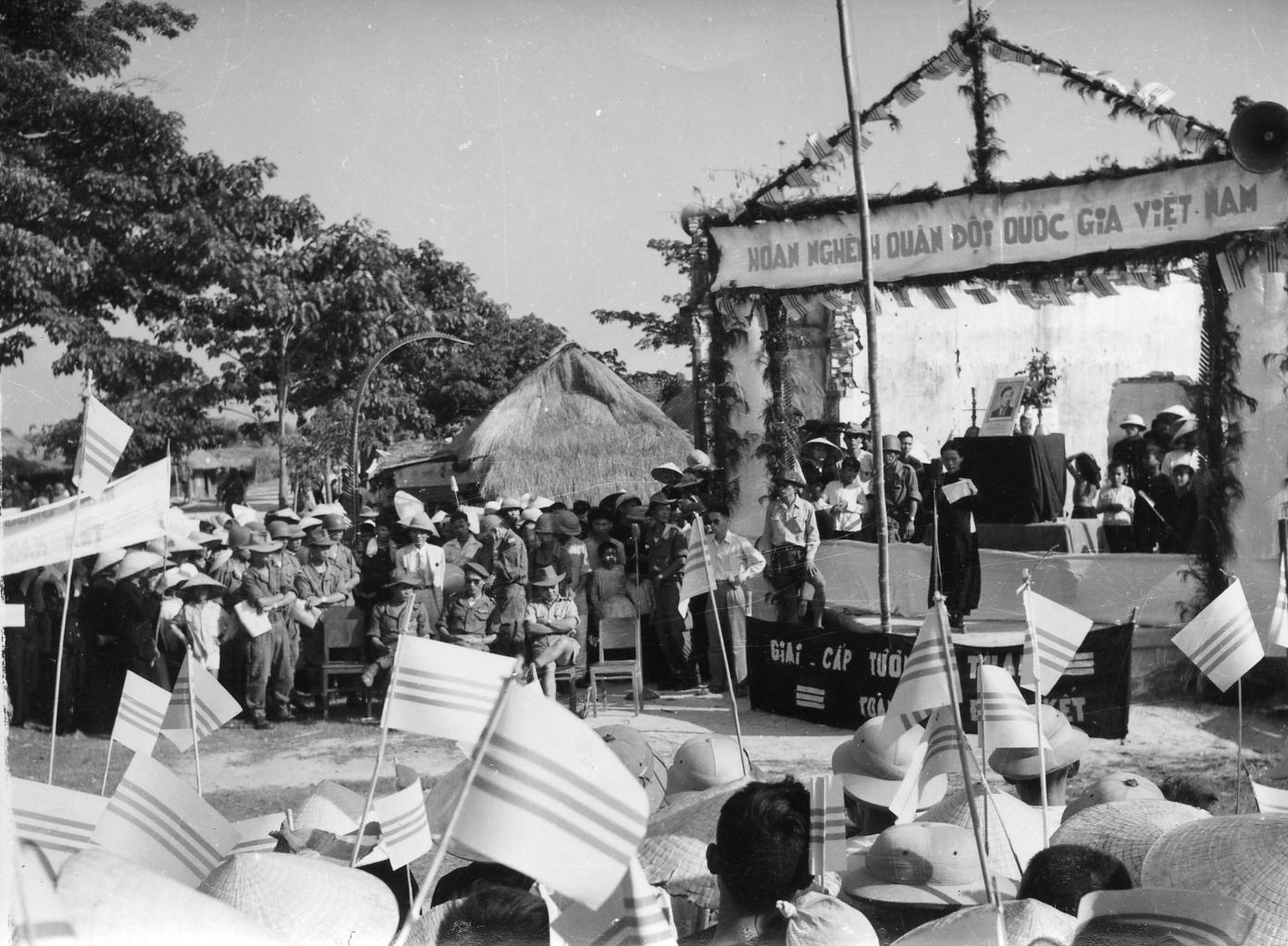
Demonstration supporting the Vietnamese National Army

The Vietnamese National Army was unofficially created on January 1, 1949, as the armed forces of the anti-communist Provisional Central Government of Vietnam. It initially had roughly 25 000 troops, including about 10 000 irregulars. 1000 French officers were given the task of training and supervising the new army. The State of Vietnam was proclaimed on July 2 of the same year, with former emperor Bảo Đại as Chief of State.

The VNA's ranks gradually grew as the VNA fought alongside the French against the communist Việt Minh led by Ho Chi Minh during the First Indochina War. The French developed the VNA's strength as they sought to delegate more operations to native anti-communist forces. Bảo Đại's army fought alongside the French Union forces until 1954 and the partition of Vietnam.

In 1955, the State of Vietnam was dissolved and replaced by Ngô Đình Diệm's Republic of Vietnam in the south while Ho Chi Minh's Democratic Republic of Vietnam remained the rival Vietnamese state in the north. In early May, civil war ensued in the capital of South Vietnam when the VNA fought General Lê Văn Viễn's Bình Xuyên forces in the latter's controlled areas of Saigon.

By 1956 all French Union troops withdrew from Vietnam and most of the VNA officers remained in service in the Army of the Republic of Vietnam. After the fall of Saigon in 1975, some joined the French Foreign Legion and others exiled to France or the United States.

== Military schools ==
=== Vietnamese National Military Academy ===
Benefiting with French cadres assistance and United States material support the VNA quickly became a modern army modeled after the CEFEO Expeditionary Corps. Officers and Non-commissioned officers were trained in local schools of cadres known in French as Ecoles des Cadres, or at the elite National Military Academy, Dalat (EETD).

The Dalat Preparatory Military School (école militaire préparatoire, EMP) was led by its first director Lieutenant Savani, a metropolitan French who was educated in the Autun EMP. It was created in 1936 after the Autun EMP as the Dalat School of the Eurasian Servicemen's Children (Ecole des Enfants de Troupe Eurasiens de Dalat, EETED). Once dissolved during the Japanese occupation in 1944, General de Lattre reformed the EETED as the Dalat School for Children of Soldiers (Ecole des Enfants de Troupe de Dalat) in 1950.

In 1953, the cadre formations raised 54 new battalions and hundreds of young Vietnamese officers were commissioned. By November the Vietnamese National Army was almost wholly composed of Vietnamese personnel of all ranks.

On the other hand, until 1954 some Vietnamese were trained four months in Infantry Instruction Centers (Centre d'Instruction de l'Infanterie, CII) based in southern Vietnam. Once licensed these recruits would not be part of the VNA but the French CEFEO. Other officer and NCO alumni were coming from all French Union national armed forces including Cambodia, Overseas (Martinique, Reunion, French Guiana), metropolitan French and "French citizens" of French West Africa and India.

==== Hoàng Diệu promotion ====
On April 20, 1952, the Dalat military academy celebrated its first promotion (Hoàng Diệu) with a "baptism" which is the Saint Cyr -French West Point- fashion. Celebrating officials included Chief of State, H.M. Emperor Bảo Đại, Prime Minister Trần Văn Hữu, General Governor of French Indochina Gautier and French General Salan, commander of the CEFEO.

The Emperor awarded the Hoàng Diệu promotion's senior and junior classes with a Saint-Cyr styled saber as new officers of the armed forces. As a symbol of the handover of self-defense responsibility of the whole Vietnam to the VNA, the senior class fired 4 traditional arrows in each direction (the arrows being a symbol of the old days of imperial Vietnam and its armed forces).

=== Training ===
Alumni of the Vatchay Light Infantry Commando school located in the Halong Bay, were trained to anti-guerrilla warfare including bayonet fighting, close quarters combat, jujutsu art, river crossing, basic rope bridge (known as "monkey bridge") crossing, enhanced camouflage, minefield crossing, barbed wire field crossing and trench warfare.

== Military ranks ==
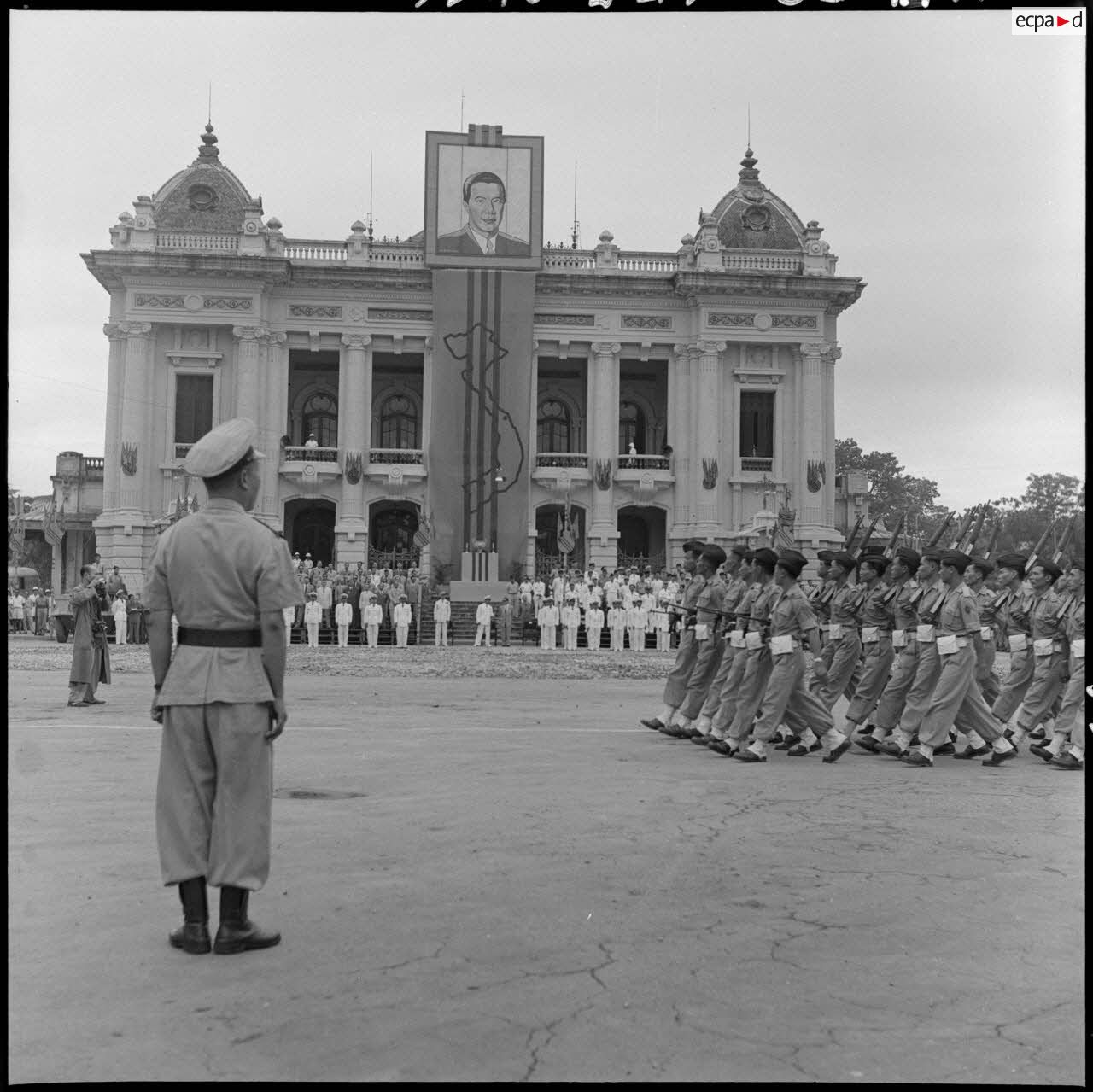
A commissioning ceremony held in front of the Hanoi Opera House

Military ranks were organized after the French army's hierarchy. Shoulder patch insignia would have three, two or one bar or star. Generals would have three stars while NCO officers with a straight bar (Sous-Lieutenant for "1st Lieutenant") were called Ong Mot ("Mister One") and those with two straight bars (Lieutenant for "2nd Lieutenant") were unofficially named Ong Hai ("Mister Two"). Since anyone working for the government was called Quan the rank Lieutenant soon replaced it, Quan Mot became Sous-Lieutenant, Quan Hai became Lieutenant and so forth.

After the founding of the Republic of Vietnam in 1955, the VNA was renamed the Army of the Republic of Vietnam. Its military ranks and hierarchy were reformed.

== Composition ==
=== Ground force ===
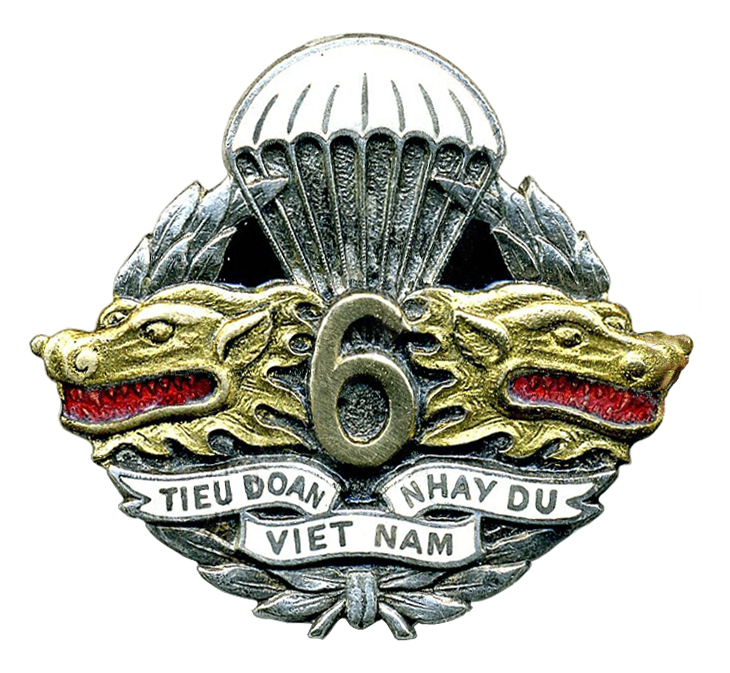
TDND 6 emblem.

Organized as a modern army the Ground Force included artillery, infantry, signal communications and armored cavalry units.

In 1953, the ANV formed six mobile groups - the GM 11, 21, 31, 32, 41 and 42 - made up of three infantry battalions and an artillery group, as well as an airborne group, groupement aéroporté 3.

Airborne regiments including paratrooper "TDND" (Tieu Doan Nhay Du, "Commando Battalion"), the so-called 1st, 3rd, 4th, 5th, 6th and 7th BAWOUAN, were later created. These elite units were referred as the "BPVN" (Bataillon de Parachutistes Viêt-Namiens, "Vietnamese Paratroopers Battalions") by their French allies. Some of these paratroopers were attached to the GCMA special forces.

=== Air force ===
The VNA air force first took part in the First Indochina War during the joint Operation Atlas in April 1953. The aviation consisted of Morane Saulnier MS-500 reconnaissance planes and Douglas DC-3 and DC-4 transport aircraft useful in airborne operations.

=== Navy ===
The navy included amphibious vehicles such as Landing Craft Infantry, Landing Craft Mechanized, small craft and materiel.

=== Marine troops ===
The Marine Troops corps was modelled after the French Troupes de marine. Their particular navy blue uniform with white gaiters is still used by the French Fusiliers Marins.

=== Special forces ===
Special forces consisted of Vietnamese commandos trained by French officers in local schools. They used a whole different personnel, uniform, equipment, training and warfare compared with the regular airborne or infantry troops.

The GCMA airborne commandos (Groupe Commando Mixte Aéroporté, "Airborne Mixed Commando Group") were Vietnamese ethnic minorities or Laotian montagnard partisans led by paratrooper officers of the SDECE French intelligence agency. Some of them would be used as cadres in the North Vietnam Commandos (Commandos Nord Viêt-nam).

In 1951, French General de Lattre commander of the CEFEO ordered for the creation of the North Vietnam Commandos to Louis Fourcade. These remained operational until 1954 with Fourcade as the "Big Boss" (le Grand Patron) until June 21, 1953.

Their mission was to collect intelligence, perform hit-and-run ambushes and bring confusion in Việt Minh controlled areas (northern Vietnam) wearing enemy uniforms and using unconventional warfare such as guerrilla techniques. These were based on both, GCMA director and famous counter-insurgency theorician Roger Trinquier's experience as French Jedburgh in World War II, and on Việt Minh POWs collaboration.

=== Independent Armies within the VNA (1949–1955) ===
In 1949, after becoming the Head-of-State, Bảo Đại made the most controversial decision concerning the armed forces of the new State of Vietnam: recognizing all non-communist military forces in the country as independent armies within the VNA. These forces included: Viet Binh Doan, Bao Chinh Doan, Bình Xuyên (approximately 40,000 strong), Hòa Hảo (30,000 men under different leaders) and Cao Đài (25,000 men). Doing so, Bảo Đại solved the problem of having to spread the army too thin in the war against the Việt Minh. Furthermore, the independent forces did not need money from the central government since they either were self-financed through clandestine activities or they were armed and financed by Savani's 2e Bureau in Vietnam. The Bình Xuyên was an organized crime military force in Saigon that provided part of Bảo Đại's luxury life.

In 1955, with Lansdale's support, Prime Minister Diem ordered all forces to surrender their weapons and to be part of one army. Some groups joined willingly while others were attacked by the regular VNA. By late 1955, all these forces ceased to exist. Many of their ranks joined the NVA or the Việt Minh, while others returned to a civilian life.

== Weaponry and equipment ==
Just like in the CEFEO, most of the VNA's military equipment was World War II vintage. Firearms were mixed U.S. and French. Helmets were mostly U.S. M1 Helmet (and airborne version) with some French copy "Model 51" (modèle 51, M51) and certain units wearing the World War II U.S. or Australian Imperial similar Slouch hat (chapeau de brousse nicknamed "broussard"). Uniforms were mixed U.S., French and British (SAS airborne).

Heavier equipment of the armoured cavalry was made of World War II vintage U.S. light tanks as they had the ability to be drop stripped and assembled by specialized engineering companies on location.

Việt Minh captured arms like German Karabiner 98k with bayonet, U.S. Browning MGs or Japanese "knee mortars" were sometimes used. These arms would often be supplied to the guerrillas by China as captured material from the Chinese Civil War (the NRA had been supplied by both Nazi Germany and the USA) or left behind by the Japanese Southern Expeditionary Army Group after the Pacific War.

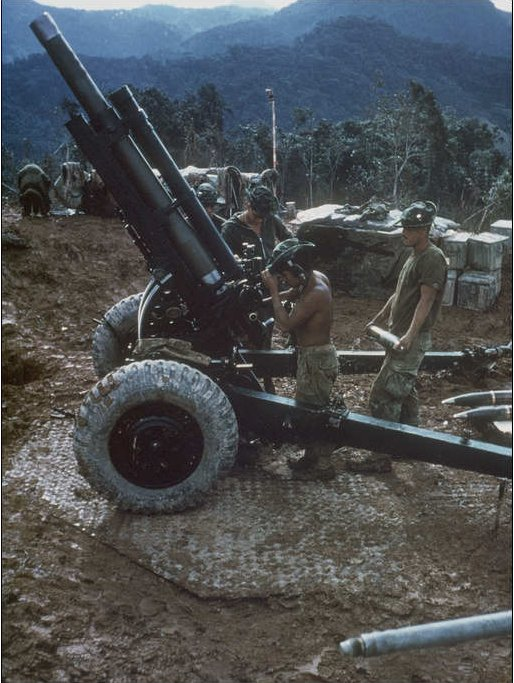
M2A1 howitzer

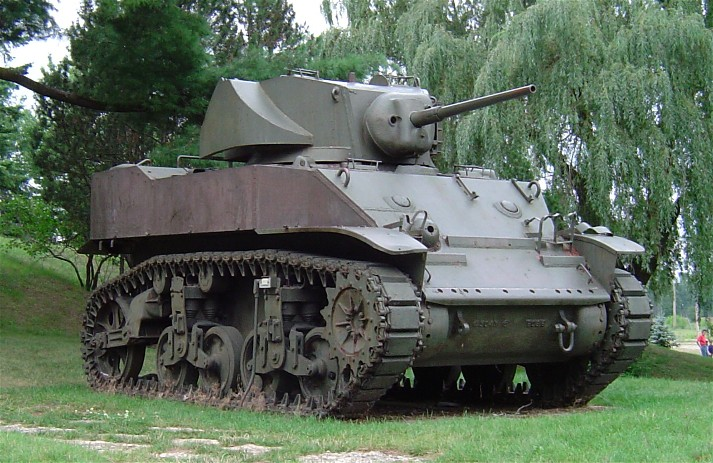
Stuart M5A1 light tank

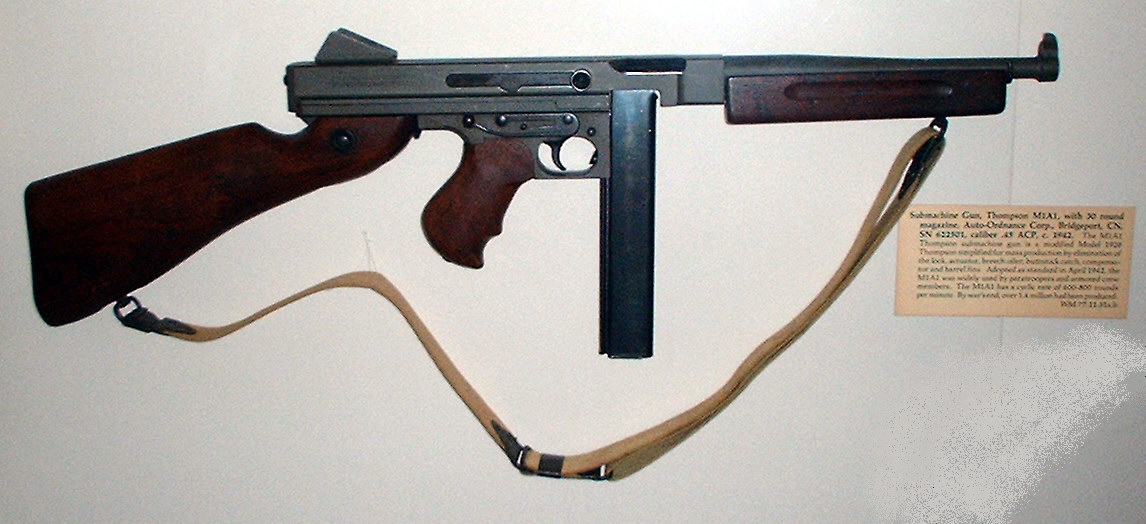
Thompson M1A1 SMG

=== Tanks ===
- (United States) Stuart M5A1 light tank
- (United States) M4 Sherman
- (United States) M24 Chaffee

=== Artillery ===
- (United States) M2A1 howitzer (105 mm)

=== Cavalry ===
- (United States) M8 howitzer motor carriage
- (United States) Stuart M5A1 light tank

=== Infantry / Airborne ===
- (United States) M1 carbine
- (United States) M1A1 carbine (M1 airborne model with retractable butt)
- (United States) Garand M1 rifle
- (United States) M1903A3 Springfield
- (United States) M1917 Enfield
- (United States) M1918A2 Browning automatic rifle
- (United States) M3 submachine gun (limited)
- (United States) Thompson M1A1 submachine gun
- (United States) Thompson M1928A1 submachine gun (11,43 mm, North Vietnam Commandos special)
- (United States) Browning M1919A4 machine gun (7.62 mm)
- (United States) Mk 2 fragmentation grenade
- (United States) M2 mortar
- (United States) M1 mortar
- (France) Lebel Model 1886 rifle
- (France) Berthier 1907/15 rifle
- (France) MAS-36 CR39 rifle (MAS-36 airborne model with retractable butt, Crosse Repliable)
- (France) MAS-36 LG48 rifle (MAS-36 modified with 48 mm grenade launcher, Lance-Grenade)
- (France) MAT-49 submachine gun
- (France) FM 24/29 light machine gun (7.5 mm)
- (France) DF37 defensive grenade
- (France) OF37 offensive grenade
- (United Kingdom) No. III Lee–Enfield
- (Nazi Germany) Karabiner 98k (Việt Minh captured)
- (Nazi Germany) Karabiner 98k bayonet (Việt Minh captured)
- (Nazi Germany) MP 40
- (Japan) Type 89 grenade launcher (Việt Minh captured)

=== Transmission ===
- (United States) SCR 300 Walkie-Talkie (with earphones)
- (United States) SCR 536 Handie-Talkie
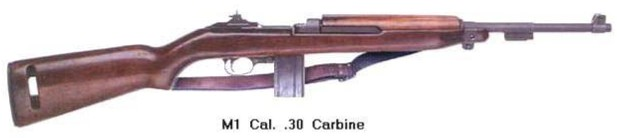
M1 carbine

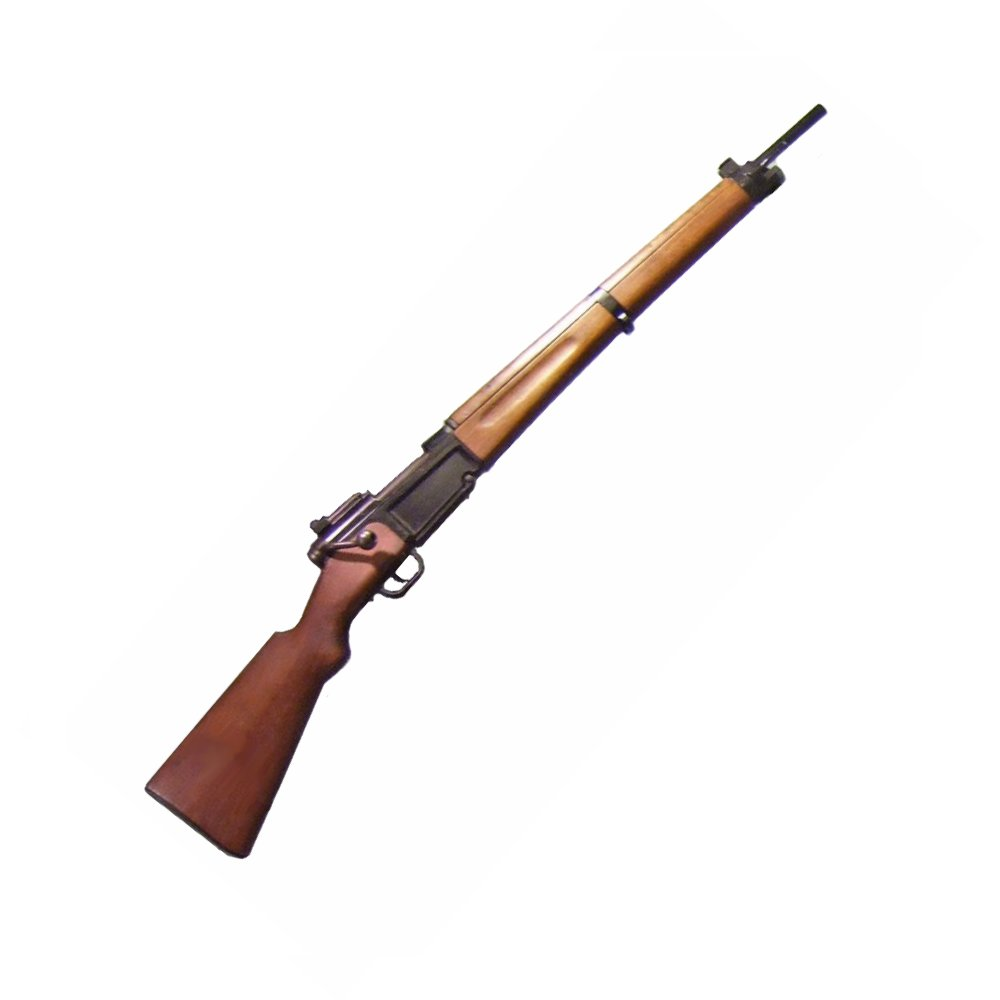
MAS-36 rifle

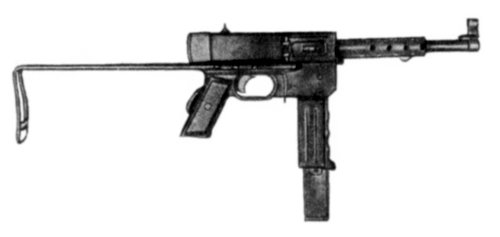
MAT 49 SMG

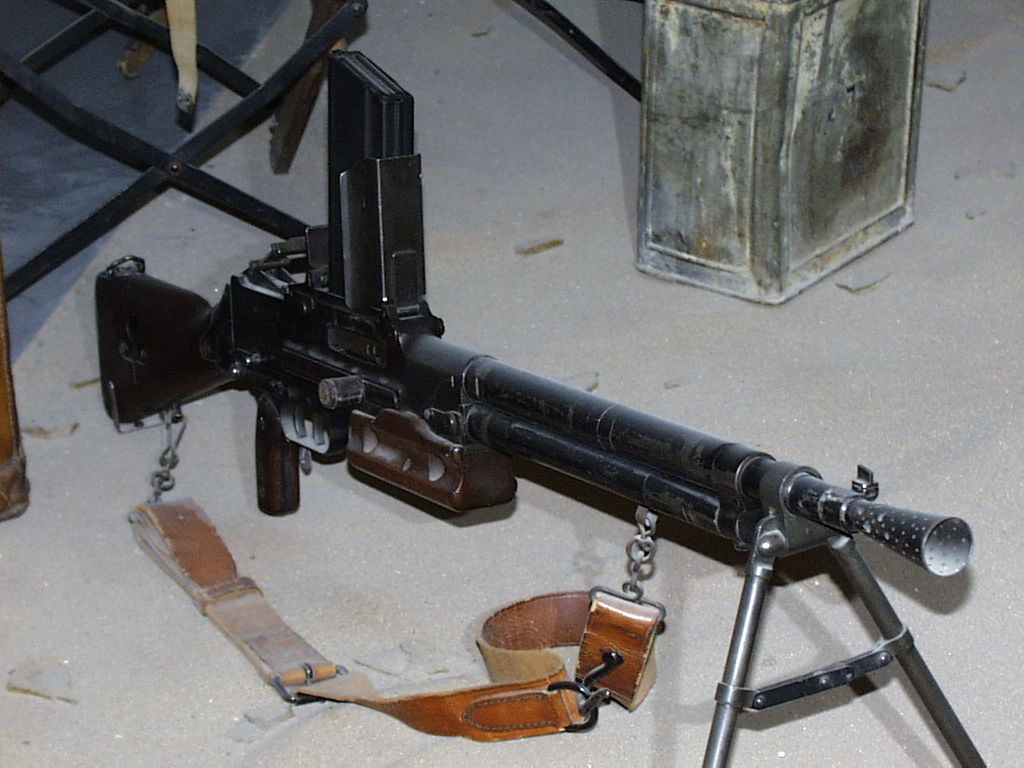
FM 24/29 LMG

== Planned participation in Europe ==
With the 1954 cease-fire, pro-French and optimistic General Nguyễn Văn Hinh stated that as early as 1955 "a Vietnamese division will be sent to France as compensation for sacrifices in Indochina by the latter. This great unit will participate in the defense of Europe as part of the opposition between the western and eastern blocs."

However the European Defence Community project was rejected by France and Nguyễn Văn Hinh's French counter-intelligence SDECE/GCMA-backed planned coup (scheduled for end October 1954) against the US-allied Ngô Đình Diệm failed. The Vietnamese general was eventually dismissed, leaving South Vietnam in November 1954, following French general Raoul Salan's departure and return to France in October. The French-American secret war and influence struggle in Vietnam engaging the SDECE against the CIA continued until 1956 when the CEFEO Expeditionary Corps was dissolved and returned to France.

=== Collins-Ely memorandum ===
On December 13, 1954, the 1954–55 French High Commissioner in Indochina (CEFEO Expeditionary Corps Commander), General Paul Ély, and the newly appointed ambassador, U.S. Special Representative in Vietnam General J. Lawton Collins, made the following agreements:

- Personnel reduction from 167,000 to 90,000 (pro-French officers purge)
- Organization and training transferred from France to the United States Military Assistance Advisory Group on January 1, 1955 (under "virtual" overall authority of the French CEFEO Commander)
- Progressive reduction of French and U.S. advisors and trainers
- Full autonomy to be granted on July 1, 1955

Both generals acknowledged that the size of the new force would be insufficient to protect South Viet Nam from external aggression. Hence, ultimate reliance was placed on Southeast Asia Treaty Organization (the Cold War era Asian equivalent to NATO), of which France and the United States were members.

== Notables ==
=== Units ===
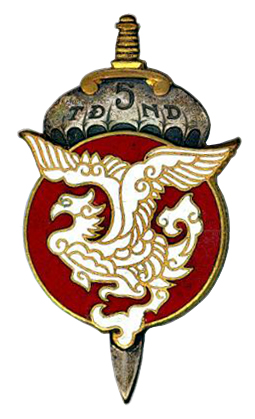
TDND 5 (a.k.a. "5e BAWOUAN") emblem. This elite airborne unit fought several battles including Dien Bien Phu.

Famous units of the VNA are:

- The 5th Vietnamese Artillery Group (5e Groupe d'Artillerie Viêt-namienne, GAVN) and the 55th Vietnamese Battalion (55e Bataillon Vietnamien) which fought at the battle of Nà Sản in 1952.
- The 301st Vietnamese Infantry Battalion (301e Bataillon Viêt-namien, BVN) and the 5th Vietnamese Airborne Battalion (TDND 5 or 5e BAWOUAN) both fought at the 1954 battle of Dien Bien Phu.

=== Personnel ===
Notes: "ARVN" stands for Army of the Republic of Vietnam, "FFL" stands for French Foreign Legion, "USA" stands for United States Army, "VNA" stands for Vietnamese National Army.

- Nguyễn Văn Hinh (commander of the VNA)
- Trần Văn Đôn (VNA, ARVN)
- Phạm Văn Đồng (VNA, ARVN)
- Nguyễn Khánh (VNA, ARVN)
- Trần Thiện Khiêm (VNA, ARVN)
- Lâm Quang Thi (VNA, ARVN)
- Dương Văn Minh (VNA, ARVN)
- Trần Văn Minh (VNA, ARVN)
- Nguyen Van Phong (VNA, FFL)
- Đặng Văn Quang (VNA, ARVN)
- Nguyễn Chánh Thi (VNA, ARVN)
- Cao Văn Viên (VNA, ARVN)
- Tran Dinh Vy (VNA, ARVN, FFL)

== See also ==
- State of Vietnam
- First Indochina War
- Army of the Republic of Vietnam

== Bibliography ==
- Pissardy, Jean-Pierre. "Commandos Nord-Vietnam: 1951-1954", Indo Editions, 1999.
- Simpson, Howard R. (August 1992). Tiger in the Barbed Wire: An American in Vietnam, 1952-1991. Brassey's Inc. ISBN 0-7881-5148-7.
- AFRVN Military History Section, J-5, Strategic Planning and Policy. Quân Sử 4: Quân lực Việt Nam Cộng Hòa trong giai-đoạn hình-thành: 1946-1955 (reprinted from the 1972 edition in Taiwan, DaiNam Publishing, 1977) [Military History volume 4: AFRVN, the formation period, 1946–1955] (in Vietnamese).
- Guillemot, François (2012). "'Be men!': Fighting and Dying for the State of Vietnam (1951–54)". War & Society. 31 (2): 184–210. doi:10.1179/0729247312Z.0000000009. S2CID 161301490.

== Archive newsreel ==
- (in French) Bao Dai honors war heroes (Vietnamese National Army footages), French newsreel archives (Les Actualités Françaises) January 3, 1952
- (in French) First promotion of the Vietnamese Army (Vietnamese National Army footages), French newsreel archives (Les Actualités Françaises) May 1, 1952
- (in French) Future Vietnamese cadres (Vietnamese National Army footages), French newsreel archives (Les Actualités Françaises) March 5, 1953
- (in French) Operation Mouette in the delta (Vietnamese National Army footages), French newsreel archives (Les Actualités Françaises) November 5, 1953
- (in French) The young army of Vietnam (Vietnamese National Army footages), French newsreel archives (Les Actualités Françaises) November 26, 1953
- (in French) Indochina: Saigon after the combats (Vietnamese National Army rushes) French news archives, ORTF, May 10, 1955
