= Task Force Oregon =

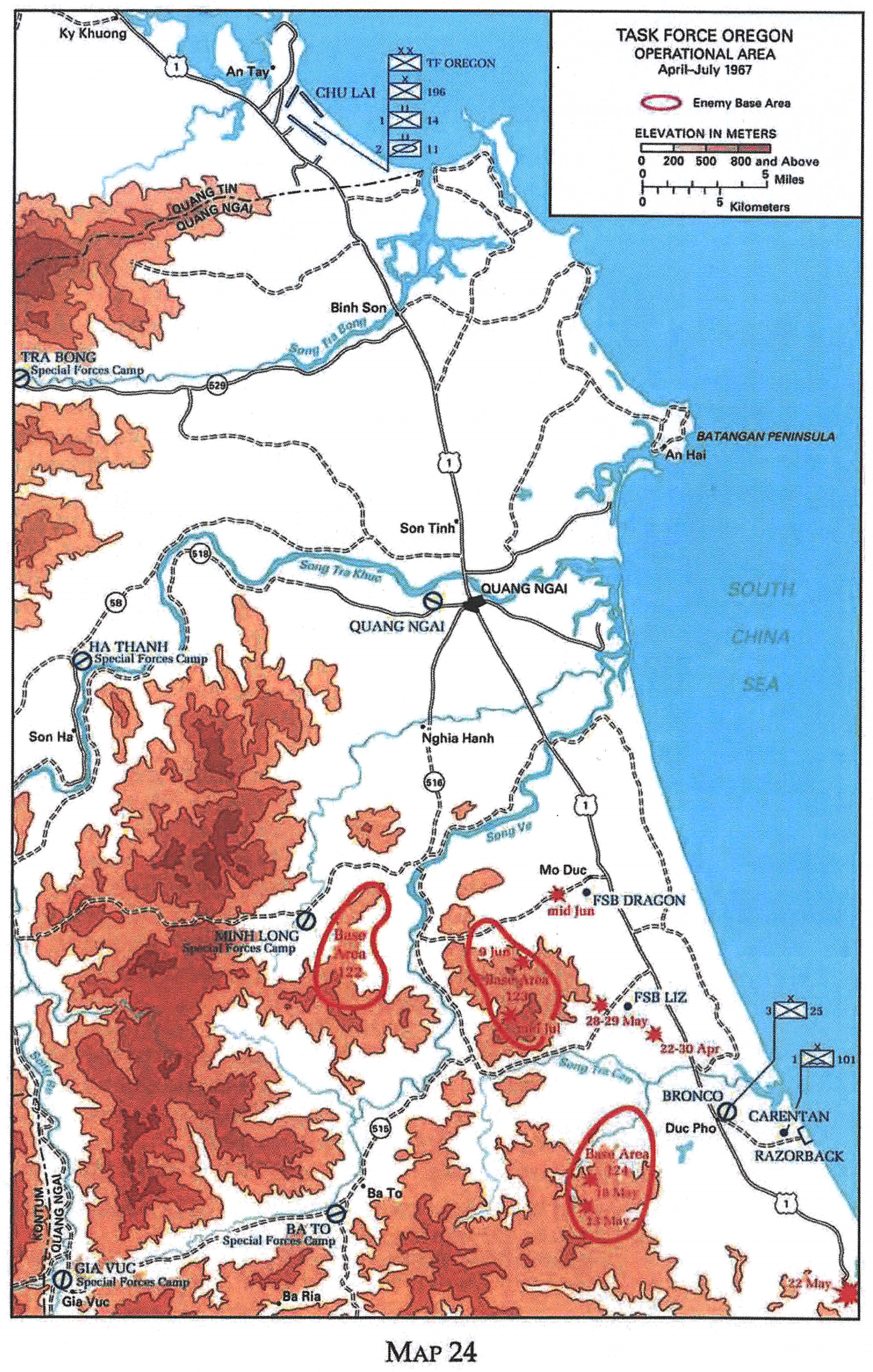
- Task Force Oregon Operational Area April - July 1967
- Active: 20 April–September 1967
- Country: United States of America
- Branch: United States Army
- Size: 3 Infantry Brigades
- Part of: Regular Army
- Garrison/HQ: Chu Lai Base Area
- Engagements: Vietnam War

Commanders
- Notable commanders: MG William B. Rosson; MG Richard T. Knowles; MG Samuel W. Koster

Task Force Oregon, was a United States Army division-sized unit composed of three separate infantry brigades, active in Quảng Ngãi and Quảng Tín Provinces, South Vietnam from April to September 1967 when it was redesignated the 23rd Infantry Division (Americal).

== Purpose and composition ==
In early April 1967 MACV gave instructions to commence the Task Force Oregon plan, which involved the movement of an Army task force to Đức Phổ and Chu Lai area to allow the 1st Marine Division to move north to Danang to support the 3rd Marine Division in northern I Corps.

COMUSMACV General William Westmoreland appointed his chief of staff MG William B. Rosson to command the unit, designated Oregon after Rosson's home state. MG Rosson reported directly to III Marine Amphibious Force which controlled I Corps, however he was generally free to manoeuvre his brigades subject to maintaining the defense of Chu Lai Air Base.

Task Force Oregon originally comprised the following units:

- 3rd Brigade, 25th Infantry Division
- 1st Brigade, 101st Airborne Division
- 196th Light Infantry Brigade
- 2nd Squadron, 11th Armored Cavalry Regiment (May–August 1967)

On 1 August 1967 the 3rd Brigade, 25th Infantry Division was redesignated the 3rd Brigade, 4th Infantry Division and the 4th Division's original 3rd Brigade, which had been operating with the 25th Infantry Division in III Corps since entering South Vietnam, was simultaneously redesignated the 3rd Brigade, 25th Infantry Division. As more U.S. Army units arrived in South Vietnam, the 3rd Brigade, 4th Infantry Division and the 1st Brigade, 101st Airborne Division were released back to their parent divisions and two newly arrived brigades, the 11th Infantry Brigade and the 198th Light Infantry Brigade were assigned to Task Force Oregon. In September 1967 Task Force Oregon was redesignated the 23rd Infantry Division (Americal).
