= William B. Rosson =

United States Army general (1918–2004)

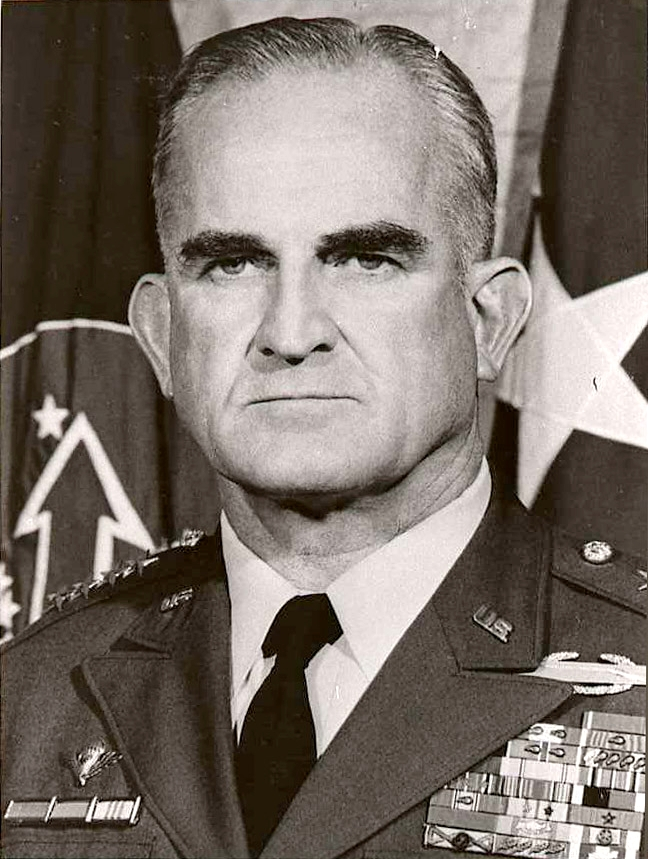
- Rosson in the 1960s
- Born: 25 August 1918; Des Moines, Iowa, U.S.
- Died: 12 December 2004 (aged 86); Salem, Virginia, U.S.
- Burial place: Arlington National Cemetery
- Military career
- Allegiance: United States of America
- Branch: United States Army
- Service years: 1940–1975
- Rank: General
- Commands: U.S. Army, Pacific; I Field Force
- Conflicts: World War II; Vietnam War
- Awards: Distinguished Service Cross; Legion of Merit; Bronze Star; Purple Heart

General William Bradford Rosson (25 August 1918 – 12 December 2004) commanded the U.S. Army, Pacific from October 1970 to January 1973. He was commissioned in 1940 through ROTC and saw combat in World War II, earning the Distinguished Service Cross for valor on the Anzio Beachhead in Italy. He also fought in North Africa, Sicily, France, and Germany.

Rosson obtained his bachelor's degree in Business Administration from the University of Oregon. After retirement from the military he earned a Master of Letters degree in International Relations from New College, Oxford University in England. His military schooling includes the U.S. Army War College and the National War College.

Major command experience for Rosson includes Commanding General for Task Force Oregon (Provisional), Commanding General for I Field Force, and Commanding General, Provisional Corps, for the U.S. Military Assistance Command, Vietnam. Later he was Deputy Commander for the same command. Rosson concluded his career as Commander in Chief of the United States Southern Command in Quarry Heights, Panama Canal Zone.

Additional assignments include serving in General Eisenhower's NATO headquarters in Paris, and duty with the French Forces in Vietnam in 1954. Because of this experience, he was valuable to General Westmoreland as Chief of Staff for the U.S. Military Assistance Command in Vietnam. Rosson also served as Director of the Plans and Policy Directorate, J5, for the Joint Chiefs of Staff in Washington, D.C..

In addition to the Distinguished Service Cross, the nation's second highest decoration for valor, General Rosson's awards include the Distinguished Service Medal, the Legion of Merit, the Bronze Star, and the Purple Heart. In 1962, German magazine Der Spiegel featured him on its frontpage. In 1988, he married Bertha Roupas Angel Mitchell. He died on 12 December 2004, of a heart attack in his home in Salem, Virginia. Rosson was buried in Arlington National Cemetery.
