= Caravelle Manifesto =

1960 South Vietnamese critique manifesto

The Caravelle Manifesto of Liberty and Progress, also referred to as the Manifesto of the Eighteen, was written in April 1960, as a public critique of the South Vietnamese government under President Ngô Đình Diệm. The manifesto of grievances included the Diệm regime's restrictions on freedom and pushed for reforms in the country. Its eighteen signatories were all old-time anti-communist politicians, leaders of the Cao Đài and Hòa Hảo sects, the Đại Việt and the Việt Quốc parties, and Catholic groups. Eleven signatories had been cabinet ministers; four had been in other high government positions. They organized themselves as the 'Bloc for Liberty and Progress', with a platform of constitutional revision toward greater power for the National Assembly against the presidency. After the November 1960 coup attempt, the government arrested most of the eighteen, and their Bloc disintegrated.

The name of the manifest is derived from the fact that the document's contents were presented at a press conference held at the Caravelle Hotel in downtown Saigon, Vietnam.

== Full text ==
The President of the Republic of Vietnam
Saigon

Mr. President:

We the undersigned, representing a group of eminent citizens and personalities, intellectuals of all tendencies, and men of good will, recognize in the face of the gravity of the present political situation that we can no longer remain indifferent to the realities of life in our country.

Therefore, we officially address to you today an appeal with the aim of exposing to you the whole truth in the hope that the government will accord it all the attention necessary so as to urgently modify its policies, so as to remedy the present situation and lead the people out of danger.

Let us look toward the past, at the time when you were abroad. For eight or nine years, the Vietnamese people suffered many trials due to the war: They passed from French domination to Japanese occupation, from revolution to resistance, from the nationalist imposture behind which hid communism to a pseudo-independence covering up for colonialism; from terror to terror, from sacrifice to sacrifice—in short, from promise to promise, until finally hope ended in bitter disillusion.

Thus, when you were on the point of returning to the country, the people as a whole entertained the hope that it would find again under your guidance the peace that is necessary to give meaning to existence, to reconstruct the destroyed homes, put to the plow again the abandoned lands. The people hoped no longer to be compelled to pay homage to one regime in the morning and to another at night, not to be the prey of the cruelties and oppression of one faction; no longer to be treated as coolies; no longer to be at the mercy of the monopolies; no longer to have to endure the depredations of corrupt and despotic civil servants. In one word, the people hoped to live in security at last, under a regime which would give them a little bit of justice and liberty. The whole people thought that you would be the man of the situation and that you would implement its hopes.

That is the way it was when you returned. The Geneva Accords of 1954 put an end to combat and to the devastations of war. The French Expeditionary Corps was progressively withdrawn, and total independence of South Vietnam had become a reality. Furthermore, the country had benefited from moral encouragement and a substantial increase of foreign aid from the free world. With so many favorable political factors, in addition to the blessed geographic conditions of a fertile and rich soil yielding agricultural, forestry, and fishing surpluses, South Vietnam should have been able to begin a definitive victory in the historical competition with the North, so as to carry out the will of the people and to lead the country on the way to hope, liberty, and happiness. Today, six years later, having benefited from so many undeniable advantages, what has the government been able to do? Where has it led South Vietnam? What parts of the popular aspirations have been implemented?

Let us try to draw an objective balance of the situation, without flattery or false accusations, strictly following a constructive line which you yourself have so often indicated, in the hope that the government shall modify its policies so as to extricate itself from a situation that is extremely dangerous to the very existence of the nation.

=== Policies ===
In spite of the fact that the bastard regime created and protected by colonialism has been overthrown and that many of the feudal organizations of factions and parties which oppress the population were destroyed, the people do not know a better life or more freedom under the republican regime which you have created. A constitution has been established in form only; a National Assembly exists whose deliberations always fall into line with the government; antidemocratic elections—all those are methods and "comedies" copied from the dictatorial Communist regimes, which obviously cannot serve as terms of comparison with North Vietnam.

Continuous arrests fill the jails and prisons to the rafters, as at this precise moment; public opinion and the press are reduced to silence. The same applies to the popular will as translated in certain open elections, in which it is insulted and trampled (as was the case, for example, during the recent elections for the Second Legislature). All these have provoked the discouragement and resentment of the people.

Political parties and religious sects have been eliminated. "Groups" or "movements" have replaced them. But this substitution has only brought about new oppressions against the population without protecting it for that matter against Communist enterprises. Here is one example: the fiefs of religious sects, which hitherto were deadly for the Communists, now not only provide no security whatever but have become favored highways for Việt Minh guerrillas, as is, by the way, the case of the rest of the country.

This is proof that the religious sects, though futile, nevertheless constitute effective anti-Communist elements. Their elimination has opened the way to the Việt Cộng and unintentionally has prepared the way for the enemy, whereas a more realistic and more flexible policy could have amalgamated them all with a view to reinforcing the anti-Communist front.

Today the people want freedom. You should, Mr. President, liberalize the regime, promote democracy, guarantee minimum civil rights, recognize the opposition so as to permit the citizens to express themselves without fear, thus removing grievances and resentments, opposition to which now constitutes for the people their sole reason for existence. When this occurs, the people of South Vietnam, in comparing their position with that of the North, will appreciate the value of true liberty and of authentic democracy. It is only at that time that the people will make all the necessary efforts and sacrifices to defend that liberty and democracy.

=== Administration ===
The size of the territory has shrunk, but the number of civil servants has increased, and still the work doesn't get done. This is because the government, like the Communists, lets the political parties control the population, separate the elite from the lower echelons, and sow distrust between those individuals who are "affiliated with the movement" and those who are "outside the group." Effective power, no longer in the hands of those who are usually responsible, is concentrated in fact in the hands of an irresponsible member of the "family," from whom emanates all orders; this slows down the administrative machinery, paralyzes all initiative, discourages good will. At the same time, not a month goes by without the press being full of stories about graft impossible to hide; this becomes an endless parade of illegal transactions involving millions of piastres.

The administrative machinery, already slowed down, is about to become completely paralyzed. It is in urgent need of reorganization. Competent people should be put back in the proper jobs; discipline must be re-established from the top to the bottom of the hierarchy; authority must go hand in hand with responsibility; efficiency, initiative, honesty, and the economy should be the criteria for promotion; professional qualifications should be respected. Favoritism based on family or party connections should be banished; the selling of influence, corruption and abuse of power must be punished.

Thus, everything still can be saved, human dignity can be reestablished; faith in an honest and just government can be restored.

=== Army ===
The French Expeditionary Corps has left the country, and a republican army has been constituted, thanks to American aid, which has equipped it with modern materiel. Nevertheless, even in a group of the proud elite of the youth such as the Vietnamese Army—where the sense of honor should be cultivated, whose blood and arms should be devoted to the defense of the country, where there should be no place for clannishness and factions—the spirit of the "national revolutionary movement" or of the "personalist body" divides the men of one and the same unit, sows distrust between friends of the same rank, and uses as a criterion for promotion fidelity toward the party in blind submission to its leaders. This creates extremely dangerous situations, such as the recent incident of Tay-Ninh.

The purpose of the army, pillar of the defense of the country, is to stop foreign invasions and to eliminate rebel movements. It is at the service of the country only and should not lend itself to the exploitation of any faction or party. Its total reorganization is necessary. Clannishness and party obedience should be eliminated; its moral base strengthened; a noble tradition of national pride created; and fighting spirit, professional conscience, and bravery should become criteria for promotion. The troops should be encouraged to respect their officers, and the officers should be encouraged to love their men. Distrust, jealousy, rancor among colleagues of the same rank should be eliminated. Then in case of danger, the nation will have at its disposal a valiant army animated by a single spirit and a single aspiration: to defend the most precious possession—our country, Vietnam.

=== Economic and Social Affairs ===
A rich and fertile country enjoying food surpluses; a budget which does not have to face military expenditures, important war reparations; substantial profits from Treasury bonds; a colossal foreign-aid program; a developing market capable of receiving foreign capital investments—those are the many favorable conditions which could make Vietnam a productive and prosperous nation. However, at the present time many people are out of work, have no roof over their heads, and no money. Rice is abundant but does not sell; shop windows are well-stocked but the goods do not move. Sources of revenue are in the hands of speculators—who use the [government] party and group to mask monopolies operating for certain private interests. At the same time, thousands of persons are mobilized for exhausting work, compelled to leave their own jobs, homes and families, to participate in the construction of magnificent but useless "agrovilles" which weary them and provoke their disaffection, thus aggravating popular resentment and creating an ideal terrain for enemy propaganda.

The economy is the very foundation of society, and public opinion ensures the survival of the regime. The government must destroy all the obstacles standing in the way of economic development; must abolish all forms of monopoly and speculation; must create a favorable environment for investments coming from foreign friends as well as from our own citizens; must encourage commercial enterprises, develop industry, and create jobs to reduce unemployment. At the same time, it should put an end to all forms of human exploitation in the work camps of the agrovilles.

Then only the economy will flourish again; the citizen will find again a peaceful life and will enjoy his condition; society will be reconstructed in an atmosphere of freedom and democracy.

Mr. President, this is perhaps the first time that you have heard such severe and disagreeable criticism—so contrary to your own desires. Nevertheless, sir, these words are strictly the truth, a truth that is bitter and hard, that you have never been able to know because, whether this is intended or not, a void has been created around you, and by the very fact of your high position, no one permits you to perceive the critical point at which truth shall burst forth in irresistible waves of hatred on the part of a people subjected for a long time to terrible suffering and a people who shall rise to break the bonds which hold it down. It shall sweep away the ignominy and all the injustices which surround and oppress it.

As we do not wish, in all sincerity, that our Fatherland should have to live through these perilous days, we—without taking into consideration the consequences which our attitude may bring upon us—are ringing today the alarm bell in view of the imminent danger which threatens the government.

Until now, we have kept silent and preferred to let the Executive act as it wished. But now time is of the essence; we feel that it is our duty—and in the case of a nation in turmoil even the most humble people have their share of responsibility—to speak the truth, to awaken public opinion, to alert the people, and to unify the opposition so as to point the way. We beseech the government to urgently modify its policies so as to remedy the situation, to defend the republican regime, and to safeguard the existence of the nation. We hold firm hope that the Vietnamese people shall know a brilliant future in which it will enjoy peace and prosperity in freedom and progress.

Yours respectfully,

1. Trần Văn Văn, Diploma of Higher Commercial Studies, former Minister of Economy and Planning
2. Phan Khắc Sửu, Agricultural Engineer, former Minister of Agriculture, former Minister of Labor
3. Trần Văn Hương, Professor of Secondary Education, former Prefect of Saigon-Cholon
4. Nguyễn Lưu Viên, M.D., former professor at the Medical School, former High Commissioner of Refugees
5. Huỳnh Kim Hữu, M.D., former Minister of Public Health
6. Phan Huy Quát, M.D., former Minister of National Education, former Minister of Defense
7. Trần Văn Lý, former Governor of Central Vietnam
8. Nguyễn Tiến Hỷ, M.D.
9. Trần Văn Đỗ, M.D., former Minister of Foreign Affairs, Chairman of Vietnamese Delegation to the 1954 Geneva Conference
10. Lê Ngọc Chấn, Attorney at Law, former Secretary of State for National Defense
11. Lê Quang Luật, Attorney at Law, former Government Delegate for North Vietnam, former Minister of Information and Propaganda
12. Lương Trọng Tường, Public Works Engineer, former Secretary of State for National Economy
13. Nguyễn Tăng Nguyên, M.D., former Minister of Labor and Youth
14. Phạm Hữu Chương, M.D., former Minister of Public Health and Social Action
15. Trần Văn Tuyên, Attorney at Law, former Secretary of State for Information and Propaganda
16. Tạ Chương Phùng, former Provincial Governor for Binh-Dinh
17. Trần Lê Chất, Laureate of the Triennial Mandarin Competition of 1903
18. Hồ Văn Vui, former Cathedral rector of Saigon, at present parish priest of Tha-La, Tay-Ninh
