= Trần Văn Tuyên =

South Vietnamese lawyer and politician (1913–1976)

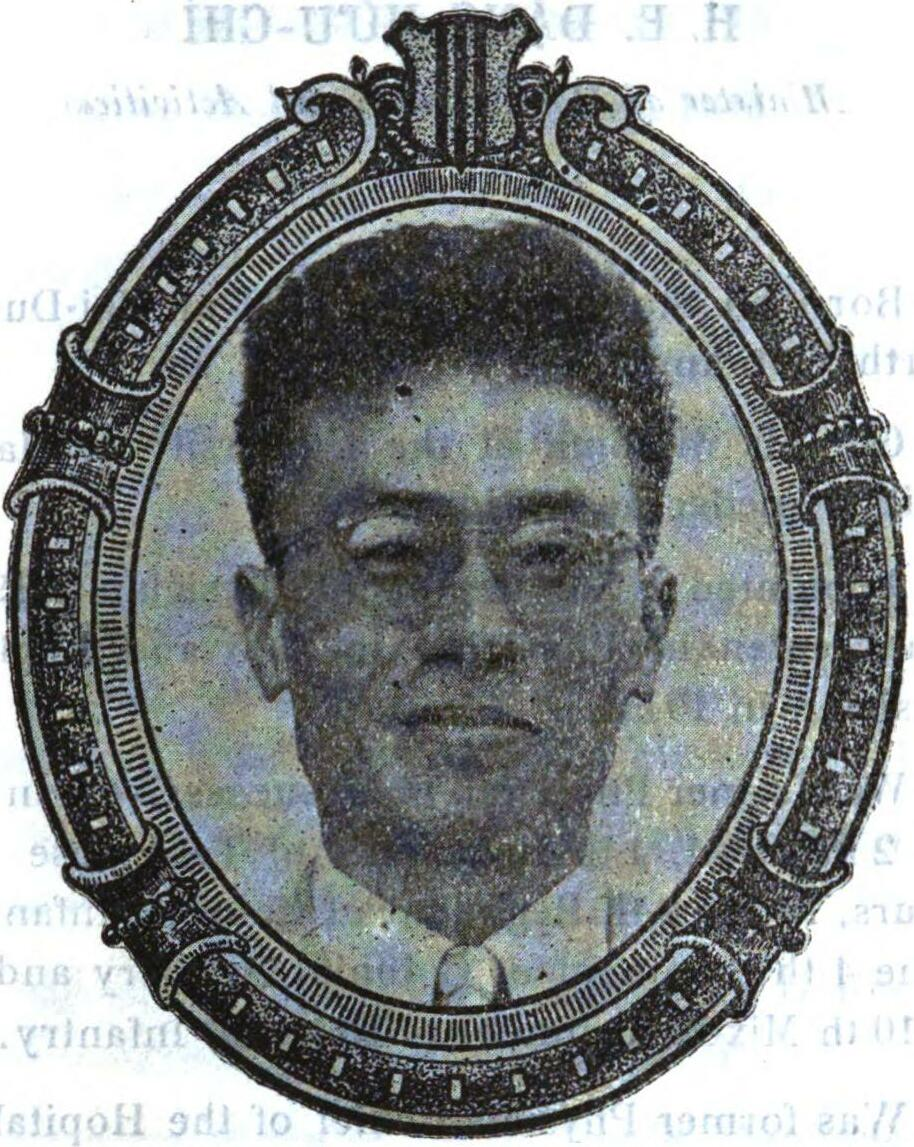
- Official portrait, 1950

Member of the House of Representatives of South Vietnam
- In office 31 October 1971 – 30 April 1975 Serving with: Hồ Ngọc Cu; Nguyễn Hữu Chung; Nguyễn Trọng Nho
- Preceded by: Diệp Văn Hưng; Huỳnh Ngọc Anh; Tăng Cửu; Võ Văn Phát
- Succeeded by: Position abolished
- Constituency: Saigon District 3

Deputy Prime Minister of South Vietnam
- In office 16 February 1965 – 12 June 1965 Serving with: Nguyễn Văn Thiệu; Trần Văn Đỗ
- Prime Minister: Phan Huy Quát
- Preceded by: Nguyễn Xuân Oánh; Nguyễn Lưu Viên
- Succeeded by: Nguyễn Hữu Có; Nguyễn Lưu Viên

Personal details
- Born: 1 September 1913 Tuyên Quang province, Tonkin, French Indochina
- Died: 28 October 1976 (aged 63) Hà Tây province, Vietnam
- Party: Việt Nam Quốc Dân Đảng
- Spouse: Phạm Thị Côn
- Children: 11 (5 sons; 6 daughters)
- Parents: Trần Văn Lợi (father); Nguyễn Thị Ly (mother)
- Education: University of Indochina (LL.B.)
- Profession: Lawyer; Politician

Trần Văn Tuyên (Vietnamese pronunciation: [t͡ɕən˨˩ van˧˧ twiən˧˧]; 1 September 1913 – 28 October 1976) was a South Vietnamese lawyer and politician who served as a member of the lower house (House of Representatives) representing Saigon District 3 from 1971 until the collapse and surrender of South Vietnam on 30 April 1975 by President Dương Văn Minh. Prior, he briefly served as Deputy Prime Minister of South Vietnam in 1965 under Prime Minister Phan Huy Quát and practiced law in Saigon. He was also a fierce political critic of both the Ngô Đình Diệm and Nguyễn Văn Thiệu governments.

== Biography ==
He was born on 1 September 1913 in Tuyên Quang province to Trần Văn Lợi and Nguyễn Thị Ly. In 1929, he joined youth league of the VNQDĐ and its where he began his political activities. In 1943 he earned an LL.B. from the University of Indochina and shortly afterwards was arrested by the French colonial government for his involvement in anti-French activities against the colonial government. Later he served as an advisor to Nhất Linh, a well known Vietnamese independence writer.

=== Political career ===
In the late 1940s to early 1950s he served as a minister in the cabinet of various prime ministers: he served as Minister of Information under Bao Dai and Nguyễn Phan Long. And a minister overseeing affairs in the prime minister's office under Trần Văn Hữu. He was a delegate in the 1954 Geneva Conference which dealt with the aftermath of the Korean War and the First Indochina War. The result of the conference resulted in the partition of Vietnam into two countries, North Vietnam and the State of Vietnam later known as South Vietnam.

He served as a lawyer for the Saigon Court of Appeals in the 1950s. He is also an author publishing several books: Hiu quạnh [Loneliness] (1943), Đế quốc đỏ [Red Empire] (1957), Tỉnh Mộng [Disillusion] (1957), Hồi Ký Hội-Nghị Genève 1954 [Memoirs of the Geneva Conference] (1964), Chánh Đảng [Political Parties] (1967), Người Khách Lạ [A Strange Visitor] (1968), and a collection of short stories.

In 1960, Tuyên, and along with other notable political figures in Saigon: Trần Văn Hương, Phan Khắc Sửu, Trần Văn Đỗ, Phan Huy Quát, Nguyễn Lưu Viên, Lê Ngọc Chấn, and Trần Văn Văn co-authored the Caravelle Manifesto, a document critiquing the Diệm regime, and demanding that reforms to be made within the government. As a result, in July 1963, he and those involved with the manifesto were put on trial for subversion, but were all later acquitted with the suicide of Nhất Linh. In 1965, he was invited to serve as a deputy prime minister of the Phan Huy Quát government where he was charge of Planning, for only four months from February to June after the government was dissolved by the Military Council. Shortly after, he returned to practicing law.

In 1971, he made a political comeback by running for a seat in the lower house in the 1971 South Vietnamese parliamentary election, he won, representing Saigon District 3. He assumed office on 31 October 1971. During his tenure in the lower house, Tuyên aligned himself with, and was leader of the Dân tộc Xã hội (Ethnic and Social) bloc, a group of deputies who served as loyal opposition to the Thiệu regime.

=== Fall of Saigon and death ===
As the PAVN was advancing to Saigon, he opted not to leave. After the Provisional Revolutionary Government of the Republic of South Vietnam has taken full control, he was later arrested on May 16, and like many of those who remained and had ties to the former Saigon government and/or to the US were sent to Trại cải tạo (Re-education camp). He was first sent to a camp in Long Thành and later relocated to Hà Tây province.

During his time in the camps, he was treated harshly. As a result, he committed suicide in late October 1976 during his confinement in the camp by slashing his wrists, bleeding out to death. His death was kept a secret for two years by the regime of the Socialist Republic of Vietnam until 1978 when his death was announced, it sparked outrage amongst the international community, demanding to know Tuyên's cause of death.

== Personal life ==
He was married to Phạm Thị Côn and had eleven children. He was also good friends with North Vietnamese general Võ Nguyên Giáp

Political offices
Preceded by Nguyễn Xuân Oánh; Nguyễn Lưu Viên	Deputy Prime Minister of the Republic of Vietnam; 1965	Succeeded by Nguyễn Hữu Có; Nguyễn Lưu Viên
Preceded by Diệp Văn Hưng; Huỳnh Ngọc Anh; Tăng Cửu; Võ Văn Phát	Member of the House of Representatives of the Republic of Vietnam from Saigon District 3; 1971–1975	Succeeded by Position abolished
