= Vice President Chen =

Vice President Chen may refer to:

- Chen Cheng (1898-1965), 2nd Vice President of the Republic of China
- Chen Chien-jen (born 1951), 11th Vice President of the Republic of China

== See also ==
- Chen (surname)
- Trần Văn Hương (陳文香, pinyin: Chén Wénxiāng, 1902–1982), 3rd Vice President of South Vietnam
