= Nguyễn Khánh =

South Vietnamese military supreme ruler (1927–2013)

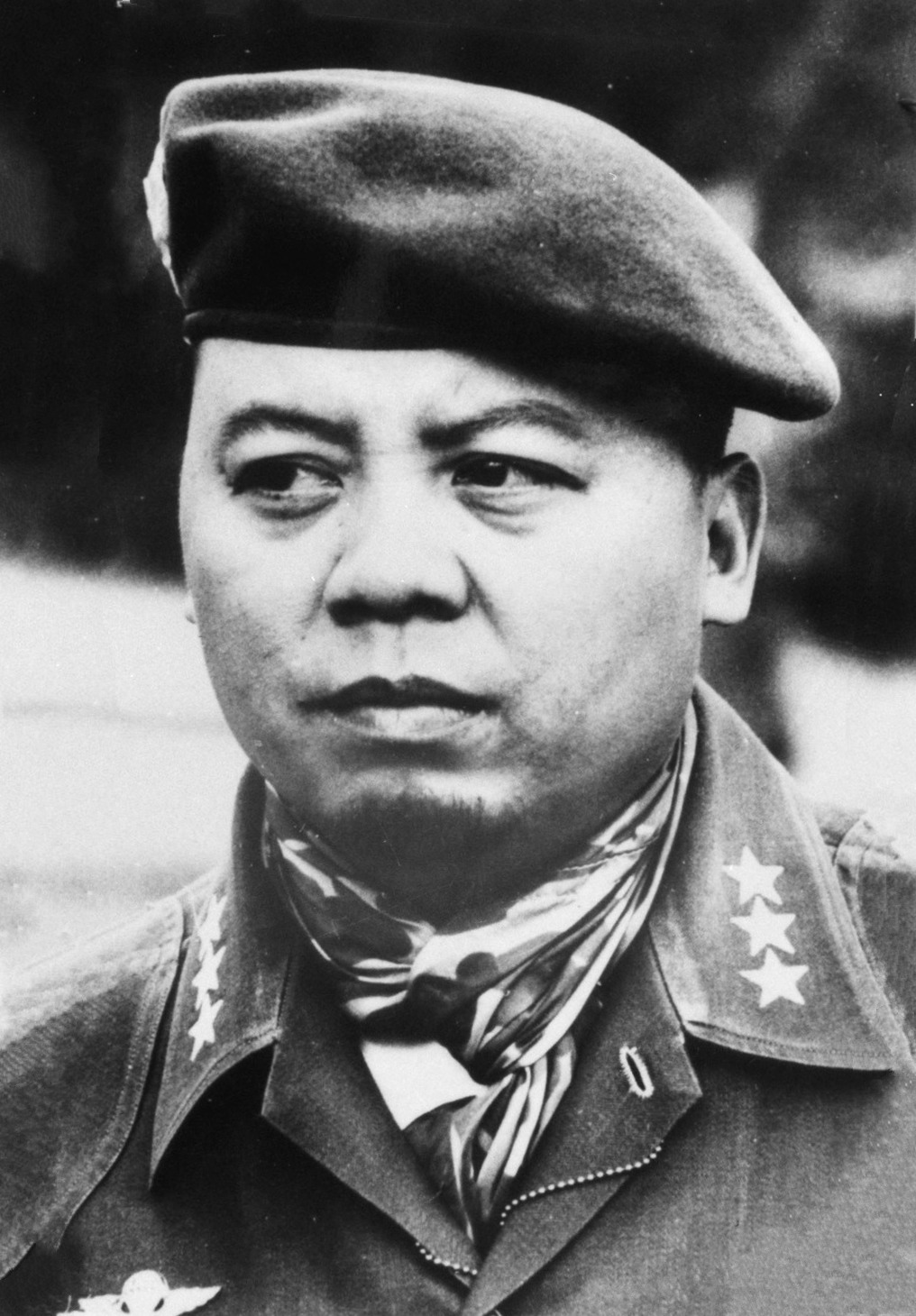
- Khánh in 1964

2nd Prime Minister of South Vietnam
- In office 3 September 1964 – 26 October 1964
- Deputy: Đỗ Mậu; Nguyễn Tôn Hoàn; Nguyễn Xuân Oánh
- Chairman of the Military Revolutionary Council: Dương Văn Minh
- Preceded by: Nguyễn Xuân Oánh (acting)
- Succeeded by: Trần Văn Hương
- In office 8 February 1964 – 29 August 1964
- Deputy: Đỗ Mậu; Nguyễn Tôn Hoàn; Nguyễn Xuân Oánh
- Chairman of the Military Revolutionary Council: Dương Văn Minh; Himself
- Preceded by: Nguyễn Ngọc Thơ
- Succeeded by: Nguyễn Xuân Oánh (acting)

2nd Chairman of the Military Revolutionary Council
- In office 16 August 1964 – 29 August 1964
- Prime Minister: Himself
- Preceded by: Dương Văn Minh
- Succeeded by: Dương Văn Minh
- In office 30 January 1964 – 8 February 1964
- Prime Minister: Vacant
- Preceded by: Dương Văn Minh
- Succeeded by: Dương Văn Minh

2nd Commander-in-chief of Republic of Vietnam Armed Forces
- In office 8 October 1964 – 21 February 1965
- Chief of State: Dương Văn Minh; Phan Khắc Sửu (De jure)
- Preceded by: Trần Thiện Khiêm
- Succeeded by: Trần Văn Minh

2nd President of the Government of Free Vietnam
- In office 2005–2013
- Preceded by: Nguyễn Hữu Chánh
- Succeeded by: Position abolished

Personal details
- Born: 8 November 1927 Trà Vinh, Cochinchina, French Indochina (now Trà Vinh, Vietnam)
- Died: 11 January 2013 (aged 85) San Jose, California, US
- Party: Independent (since 1965)
- Other political affiliations: Military (until 1965)
- Spouse: Madame Khánh
- Children: 6; 1 stepdaughter
- Relatives: Nguyễn Lưu Viên (uncle)
- Awards: National Order of Vietnam; Gallantry Cross (South Vietnam); Legion of Honour
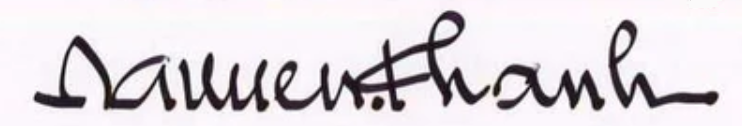
- Signature
- Military career
- Allegiance: State of Vietnam; Republic of Vietnam
- Service years: 1950–1965
- Rank: General (Đại tướng)
- Commands: 11th Mobile Group (1953–1954); Vietnam Air Force (1955); 1st Infantry Division (1956–1957); II Corps (1962–1963); I Corps (1963–1964)
- Conflicts: First Indochina War; Vietnam War
- Other work: Prime Minister (1964); Head of state (1964); Ambassador-at-large (1965–1975)

Nguyễn Khánh (Vietnamese: [ŋwiəŋ˨˩˦ kʰan˦˥]}; 8 November 1927 – 11 January 2013) was a Vietnamese military officer and politician. A general of the Army of the Republic of Vietnam, he was the leader of South Vietnam from January 1964 until February 1965 while at the head of a military junta, serving during that time in various capacities, alternatively as head of state and as prime minister. He was involved in or against many coup attempts, failed and successful, from 1960 until his defeat and exile from South Vietnam in 1965. Khánh lived out his later years with his family in exile in the United States. He died in 2013 in San Jose, California, at age 85.

== Early life and education ==
Khánh was born in Trà Vinh in the Mekong Delta region in the far south of Vietnam (then under jurisdiction of the French Cochinchina). His mother was a property manager in the Central Highlands resort town of Đà Lạt, and lived away from the family home in the deep south. Khánh's father was a wealthy landlord who lived in the Mekong Delta with a mistress, the popular cải lương performer Phùng Há. Khánh was brought up by his de facto stepmother. Trà Vinh is a border town near Cambodia and the family moved between both countries. Khánh began his education in Cambodia and when he grew up, he moved to Saigon to study at an elite French school, boarding with wealthy relatives.

== Việt Minh years ==
In late 1945, Khánh finished his secondary studies and along with 20 fellow high school graduates left Saigon to join the communist-dominated Việt Minh, led by Ho Chi Minh, which sought to gain independence from French colonialism. The August Revolution had just occurred and Hồ had declared independence from France in the aftermath of World War II in September under the newly proclaimed Democratic Republic of Vietnam. In his early military years, Khánh came across many other young recruits who would rise up the ranks alongside him and variously become allies and bitter rivals. One of Khánh's Việt Minh instructors was his future enemy Phạm Ngọc Thảo, who later joined the anti-communist forces while remaining a Việt Minh agent. Khánh's unit became the 410th Battalion and went on to fight near Cà Mau, the southernmost part of Vietnam. They started with only pieces of bamboo and had to capture or steal their weapons.

However, Khánh soon left Hồ's forces after 15 months. He claimed that he had left the Việt Minh because of its communist inclinations, but critics claimed that he was simply switching sides because the French-backed State of Vietnam offered him more opportunities for advancement and better pay. Another account says that Khánh's unit was relieved by a larger and stronger unit that was better trained and indoctrinated in communist ideology, and that Khánh's band were "too tired" after their tour of duty and did not have the "proper discipline". Khánh claimed they were removed because they were nationalists rather than communists.

In 1946, he graduated from the French Military Academy Saint-Cyr/Coëtquidan and was promoted to "Indochine", and the Ecole des Troupes Aéroportées (Airborne forces) in France. In 1947, he graduated from the Vien Dong (Dap Da) Military Academy and Saumur (France) Military Academy, with the rank of lieutenant. His first assignment was as a Platoon Leader of the 1st Battalion, Attaché Officer to the Prime Minister.

== Early years in the Army of the Republic of Vietnam ==
Khánh then joined the Vietnamese National Army (VNA) of the French-backed State of Vietnam under the leadership of former Emperor Bảo Đại. The State of Vietnam was an associated state of the French Union and fought in the First Indochina War alongside French forces against the Việt Minh.

Khánh was part of the first batch of Vietnamese officers trained by the French in the country. Of the 17 students who started the course, only 11 passed. The six that failed to finish and eight of the graduates defected and joined the Việt Minh. Khánh was one of only three to join the VNA. Khánh claimed he tried to dissuade his classmates to not join the Việt Minh as they were communist, but he also briefly rejoined Hồ's side before being commissioned with the VNA.

From 1949 to 1952, he was a lieutenant and commanded the first airborne unit in the VNA after being sent to France for training. He was then promoted to the rank of captain and commanded the first ever VNA airborne drop, participating in the Hòa Bình Operation in northern Vietnam under the command of General Jean de Lattre de Tassigny. Khánh jumped with his paratroopers into the Hòa Bình after a heavy French defeat and carried out a rearguard action to cover the French retreat. He was wounded and ended as a regimental combat team. In an interview with the journalist Stanley Karnow in 1966, Khánh spoke with much pride of his service under de Lattre de Tassigny, saying "We campaigned together all over the country", though Karnow noted that Khánh was being somewhat misleading in suggesting that he and de Lattre de Tassigny were friends. In another interview with Karnow in 1981, Khánh stated he became disillusioned when he learned that as an Asian man the French would always look down on him, which led him to favor the idea of a "third force" of anti-Communist Vietnamese nationalists who would be equally opposed to the French. In common with the other newly independent states in Africa and Asia, in the State of Vietnam there was a shortage of officers, especially for high command positions, and Khánh rose rapidly up the ranks. After the partition of Vietnam, Khánh was chosen by President Ngô Đình Diệm as the inaugural commander (titled "Chief of Staff") of the Republic of Vietnam Air Force. He took a crash course in flying, and took to the air unaccompanied after 11 hours of instruction.

From 1956 to 1957, he was promoted to colonel and commanded the First Infantry Division stationed at the 17th Parallel. In 1957, he was chosen to attend the US Army Command and General Staff College, Fort Leavenworth, Kansas, US Joint & Combined School in Okinawa, Japan, and he graduated from the US High Command as Chief of Staff in France. In 1957, he was assigned as Region Commander of the Hậu Giang region, consisting of Kiến Hòa, Mỹ Tho and Vĩnh Long. He was appointed Secretary General of the Defense Ministry in 1959. In 1960, Khánh was promoted to major general and made ARVN Chief of Staff.

== Anti-coup loyalist in 1960 ==
In November 1960, mutinous paratroopers attempted to depose Diệm, and laid siege to Gia Long Palace. Khánh arrived on the scene and climbed over the palace wall to reach Diệm during the siege. Khánh lived close to the palace, and the plotters had tried to put him under house arrest at the start of the coup, but were unaware that he moved houses. Khánh proceeded to coordinate the loyalist defenders, along with Ky Quan Liem, the deputy director of the Civil Guard. During the standoff, Khánh met with rebel officers to keep abreast of their demands that Diệm share power. He then advised Diệm to resign due to the demands of the rebel forces and protestors outside the palace, but the president refused.

Khánh used the remaining communication lines to appeal to other senior officers outside Saigon to help, and two divisions near Saigon complied. He convinced Lê Nguyên Khang, the head of the Republic of Vietnam Marine Corps to contribute. Diệm advised Khánh to continue negotiating, and a ceasefire was organised. Diệm promised reforms, but then reneged and crushed the coup.

Khánh's actions gained him a reputation of having helped the president, but he was later criticised for having a foot in both camps. Critics claimed that Khánh had been on good terms with the rebels and decided against rebelling when it was clear that Diệm would win. Khánh was later dispatched to the Central Highlands as the commander of the II Corps. His American advisers were impressed with him and regarded him as an effective force against the Việt Cộng. Khánh also tried to win over the indigenous Montagnard tribesmen, trying to learn their languages.

== 1963 and 1964 coups ==
Khánh participated in the 1963 South Vietnamese coup led by General Dương Văn Minh that deposed Diệm, playing a minor role. Khánh expected a large reward, but the junta instead sidelined him, excluding him from the twelve-man Military Revolutionary Council (MRC). In mid-December he was moved from the II Corps in the central highlands to the command of the I Corps of the Army of the Republic of Vietnam, based around Huế and Đà Nẵng in the far north of the Republic of Vietnam. This, it was speculated, was to keep him as far away from Saigon as possible, as he was regarded by the others as being untrustworthy.

This was contrary to Khánh's request for a transfer to the IV Corps in the Mekong Delta close to Saigon, where most of the unconventional fighting was taking place. In an interview with journalist Robert Shaplen, Khánh made no attempt to hide his annoyance at not being given a more important job. With respect to the 1963 coup, he cryptically commented, "It is too soon yet to tell the whole story, but someday I will tell it to you". He began to plot against Minh's junta. Khánh claimed that "After the November coup, there was much relaxation, wining and dining, and little prosecution of the war effort." He claimed he had built up intelligence infrastructure to weed out the Việt Cộng under Diệm's rule, but that the other generals had disbanded it and released communist prisoners.

At the time, Saigon was plagued by infighting. A civilian government and cabinet led by Prime Minister Nguyễn Ngọc Thơ was appointed, but was hindered by vetoes by the generals. All twelve generals in the MRC had equal power and the power of veto. The press strongly attacked Thơ, accusing his government of being "tools" of the MRC. Minh was criticised for being lethargic and uninterested in running the country, while communist attacks increased and the military situation deteriorated.

At the end of December, Khánh was approached by General Đỗ Mậu, one of the principal tacticians in the removal of Diệm. Mậu had been the head of military security under Diệm and had a deep understanding of most of the senior officers and their strengths and weaknesses. The MRC feared Mậu and sidelined him, causing him to plot. Mậu began to recruit rebels. The most important link in Mậu's plan was Colonel Nguyễn Chánh Thi, who led the 1960 coup attempt against Diệm. Mậu persuaded the junta to install Thi as Khánh's deputy in the I Corps. He tricked the junta into doing so by reasoning that Khánh had largely been responsible for putting down the 1960 revolt and that Thi would be an ideal mechanism to keep Khánh, whom the MRC distrusted, in check. Mậu's real reason was to use Thi would be a bridge between himself and Khánh. He was correct in thinking that the 1960 conflict would be irrelevant in the shifting allegiances over time and that the pair would work together for their current aims.

Mậu recruited a second figure in the form of General Trần Thiện Khiêm, who had worked with Mậu during the November coup. Khiêm had assisted Diệm in putting down the 1960 plot and had since been demoted from being Chief of Staff of the ARVN to the commander of the III Corps that surrounded Saigon. Khiêm readily joined the plot and controlled the troops near the capital. Khiêm, Khánh and Mậu kept in touch surreptitiously on a regular basis, supplementing their forces with an assortment of Marine, Air Force and Special Forces officers. Another notable recruit was the chief of the Civil Guard, Dương Ngọc Lâm. He was under investigation by the junta for swindling military funds and was readily converted. Another was General Dương Văn Đức, who had recently returned from exile in Paris.

At the time, there was innuendo that the MRC would become neutralist and stop fighting the communists, and that they were plotting with French President Charles de Gaulle, who supported such a solution in order to remove the US presence. De Gaulle had just recognized the People's Republic of China as the legitimate government of China, a move that angered the US government, which still recognized the Republic of China on Taiwan as the rightful government of China, and was supporting the neutralization of South East Asia. The French recognition of the People's Republic of China led American officials to see de Gaulle's neutralist plans as pro-communist. Khánh's allies concocted documents purporting to show that Generals Minh, Lê Văn Kim and Trần Văn Đôn were making neutralist moves, and the papers were leaked to some senior American officials. Khánh sometimes plotted while in Saigon on military affairs, and told various American officials that Đôn, Kim and General Mai Hữu Xuân, along with Minh, were "pro-French and pro-neutralist" and part of de Gaulle's plan. Khánh claimed the fact that Đôn had invited two members of the French National Assembly, both from de Gaulle's party, to dine with him, Kim and Minh as proof. The American ambassador in Saigon, Henry Cabot Lodge Jr., believed in the rumors that Kim and Đôn favored neutrality for South Vietnam in the Cold War.

On 28 January, Khánh flew from Huế to Saigon in civilian clothes, ostensibly for a dental appointment. A number of American officers and embassy officials were alerted to be in their offices at two o'clock in the morning of 30 January. The US Ambassador, Henry Cabot Lodge Jr., was kept fully informed throughout the night.

Before dawn on 30 January, Khánh surrounded the military headquarters at Tân Sơn Nhứt Air Base. Meanwhile, Khiêm had overslept when he was supposed to seal off the homes of the junta members. Despite this, by daybreak, Khánh had taken over the government without a shot having been fired. In his first radio broadcast on the same morning, Khánh assailed the MRC's performance during its three months at the top. He said, "The political, economic, and social situation in the countryside still offers no promising prospect. There has not been one single compensation worthy of the sacrifices accepted daily by the soldiers."

US officials in Washington were caught off guard by the coup. Although Khánh had already told CIA officer Lucien Conein (who helped to plan the coup against Diệm) in December 1963 that he intended to hold a coup, it was filed away among the many political rumour documents that were received by the American representatives. Following the coup, he was promoted by the Americans as South Vietnam's new hope. In a dispatch to Washington, Cabot Lodge wrote: "We have everything we need in Vietnam. The United States has provided military advice, training, equipment, economic and social help, and political advice...Therefore, our side knows how to do it. We have the means to it. We simply need to do it. This requires a tough and ruthless commander. Perhaps Khánh is it".

== Setting up the junta ==
Khánh used de Gaulle's policy plans to enact retribution against Generals Đôn and Kim. Khánh had them arrested on grounds of neutralism. Khánh noted that they had served in the French-backed VNA, although he did as well. The generals were flown to My Khe beach, near Đà Nẵng, along with Generals Tôn Thất Đính and Mai Hữu Xuân, the interior minister and police chief, respectively, of the MRC. However, Khánh was unable to produce any proof that Đôn and Kim had been working with the French agents to create a neutralist government in Saigon, and the case collapsed in court, with Khánh instead pressing for charges of "lax morality" to compensate for his failure to find any evidence supporting his claim of a French conspiracy.

Khánh also had Major Nguyễn Văn Nhung, the bodyguard of Minh, shot. Nhung had executed Diệm and his brother Ngô Đình Nhu in the 1963 coup, as well as the loyalist Special Forces head Colonel Lê Quang Tung, and claimed it to be suicide. On 31 January 1964, Nhung was forced to kneel in a garden behind a Saigon villa and was shot once in the head by one of Khánh's bodyguards, through the official story was that Nhung had hanged himself out of guilt for executing the Diệm brothers. Karnow wrote that Nhung was a "professional assassin" known for his love of killing, but his symbolic importance outweighed his unsavory and brutal life. Nhung had become a symbol of anti-Diệmism, and his execution lead to fears that Diệm's policies and loyalists would return. This resulted in riots in Saigon, notably among Buddhists who were persecuted by Diệm. Of the 14 Buddhist sects in South Vietnam, the heads of 11 of them agreed to form an alliance to oppose the Khánh regime, which was seen as favoring the same Vietnamese Catholics who had been favored under Diệm. Tri Quang, the Buddhist monk who had organized protests against Diệm in 1963, was planning to go on a pilgrimage to "bury my life" in India, Japan and Ceylon when he heard of Nhung's execution, and instead decided to stay in South Vietnam to challenge the new government.

Khánh proclaimed himself as the new head of state and chairman of the MRC, replacing Minh. Khánh later managed to persuade Minh to remain as a figurehead head of state due to American pressure. They reasoned that the popular Minh would be a unifying and stabilising factor in the new régime and provide continuity. However, Khánh soon came to dominate the MRC. Khánh turned out to be far more politically astute and vigorous than his predecessors, seeking out veteran Vietnamese politicians and technicians to create a new government. A week after coming to power, Khánh summoned Nguyễn Tôn Hoàn, a Roman Catholic who was one of the former leaders of the southern branch of the Catholic-aligned Đại Việt Quốc Dân Dảng (Greater Vietnam Nationalist Party). Hoàn had been exiled in Paris during the Diệm era, but remained active, publishing a magazine and keeping up to speed with developments in Vietnam. Hoàn had generated little popular following during his campaign for power in the 1940s and 1950s and was unable to form a government as prime minister when he returned. Hoàn was unpopular with the younger members of the Đại Việt who complained that he was too old and had spent too much time in exile to really understand modern Vietnam. Khánh decided to act as both Prime Minister and chairman of the reorganised MRC, which he expanded to include 17 generals and 32 further officers, giving a total of 50 members.

Khánh made Hoàn the first Deputy Prime Minister in charge of rural pacification. Khánh gave Hoàn five ministries, including the Interior, National Defense and Rural Affairs and two special commissions, which were primarily engaged in consolidating the strategic hamlets of Ngô Đình Nhu into the renamed New Rural Life Hamlets. A second Deputy Prime Ministerial post was given to Harvard University trained banker and economist Nguyễn Xuân Oánh, who was associated with the Đại Việt. Oánh was charged with managing the finance and economy of the country. Mậu was the third deputy, overseeing social and cultural affairs.

Khánh selected a cabinet of thirteen ministers and two Secretaries of State at Cabinet level and chose new provincial and district chiefs. He originally tried to include members of a variety of political and religious groups including representatives of the Cao Đài and Hòa Hảo, which still had remnants of their private armies intact after their dismantling by Diệm in 1955. Although Khánh insisted that he had no party affiliation, the orientation of his government was toward the Đại Việt, who held many key posts. This provoked bitterness from other anti-communist nationalists and groups that were banned under the Diệm period and were seeking a greater role in the public life of South Vietnam, as well as from younger citizens who felt that the established nationalist parties were responsible for divisions in the country.

In the meantime, the government continued to lose the war against the guerrillas of the National Liberation Front, better known as the Viet Cong, which increased the tempo of their operations in the countryside and began a campaign of assassinations and bombings in Saigon targeting government officials and American advisers. In late February 1964, the government suffered a humiliating debacle when an outnumbered Viet Cong battalion in the Mekong delta were surrounded by 3, 000 of the "best" South Vietnamese troops. Despite being outnumbered and outgunned, the Viet Cong fought off the attacks and were able to escape from the pocket as the South Vietnamese Army were unwilling to fight without air support and artillery support. The fact that the troops engaged in this operation had been graded as among the very "best" soldiers in the entire South Vietnamese Army by the American advisers who had trained them added to the humiliation. In the aftermath, Khánh sacked 3 out of the 4 corps commanders and 5 out of the 9 division commanders, complaining that the army was led by officers unwilling to fight. In Washington, the news that despite the fact that South Vietnam had received American military aid worth hundreds of millions of dollars and had its army trained by American officers that the South Vietnamese Army was still incapable of winning battles provoked much worry about what was going on in South Vietnam. Lyman Kirkpatrick, the inspector-general of the CIA, visited the American embassy in Saigon that same month, and reported to Washington that he was "...shocked by the number of our people and of the military, even those whose job is always to say that we are winning, who feel the tide is against us".

Starting on 8 March 1964, the US Defense Secretary, Robert McNamara, visited South Vietnam for four days to assess the military situation and to let the South Vietnamese people know that the United States was firmly behind Khánh. Speaking carefully memorized phrases in badly mangled Vietnamese (McNamara kept forgetting Vietnamese is a tonal language) in a series of speeches McNamara praised Khánh as the "best possible leader" that South Vietnam had and urged all South Vietnamese people to back his government. McNamara's visit was a disaster for Khánh's image as the Americans believed that the South Vietnamese people would back his government more effectively if they knew that the United States was supporting him; to Vietnamese ears, McNamara's speeches came across as arrogant and colonialist as it seemed that he was telling the Vietnamese that they should follow Khánh because the United States wanted them to do. As a result, Khánh came to be seen as an American stooge by many of his people. Upon his return to Washington, McNamara told President Johnson that the situation had "unquestionably been growing worse" since his last trip to South Vietnam in December 1963; that 40% of the countryside was under "Vietcong control or predominant influence"; while the Vietcong was "recruiting energetically" desertions in the South Vietnamese Army were "high and increasing"; and finally the South Vietnamese people were overcome by "apathy and indifference" as no one it seemed really wanted to save South Vietnam. Despite his public praise of Khánh, McNamara told Johnson that the "greatest weakness" was the "uncertain viability of Khánh's regime, which might crumble at any moment in another coup". However, McNamara's conclusion was that the weakness of Khánh's regime meant that the United States should increase its involvement in Vietnam as McNamara recommend that the United States should drastically increase its military and economic aid to South Vietnam, advice that was accepted in an "action memorandum" issued by the National Security Council shortly afterwards.

Khánh promised that the village elections that were abolished under Diệm would be held as soon as feasible and that a new National Assembly would be elected within a year. He started by abolishing the Council of Notables, an advisory body. Many Vietnamese and American observers considered this rash and premature, as promises of elections had been frequently broken and the council had at least been an effective forum for dissent in the absence of parliamentary representation.

However, Khánh received little assistance from Minh, who resented his deposal by a younger officer whom he viewed as an unscrupulous upstart. Minh was also upset with the detention of his colleagues and around 30 of his junior officers. The latter were set free when Minh demanded that Khánh release them as a condition for his cooperation. Khánh attempted to avoid the issue of substantiating the alleged plot as long as he could, and then claimed that French agents were attempting to assassinate him and implement neutralism. Khánh offered no evidence, only claiming that the French had paid a hit man US$1,300 to kill him, before later inflating the supposed reward for his assassination. US intelligence officials in Vietnam found the story spurious.

=== Trial of rival generals ===
Khánh presided over the trial of the MRC members, which took place in May 1964. Minh was accused of misusing money before being allowed to serve as an advisor on the trial panel. The generals were interrogated for five and a half hours, and the military court deliberated for over nine hours. When it reconvened for the verdict, Khánh stated, "We ask that once you begin to serve again in the army, you do not take revenge on anybody". The tribunal "congratulated" the generals, but found that they were of "lax morality", unqualified to command due to a "lack of a clear political concept". They were chastised for being "inadequately aware of their heavy responsibility" and of letting "their subordinates take advantage of their positions". They were allowed to remain in Đà Lạt under surveillance with their families.

All four were barred from commanding troops for various periods. Offices were prepared for the quartet so that they could participate in "research and planning". Khánh made some preliminary arrangements to send the generals to the United States for military study so that they could not stage a coup, but this fell through. Khánh's actions left divisions among the officer corps of the ARVN. When Khánh was himself deposed in 1965, he handed over dossiers proving that the generals were innocent. Shaplen said "the case ... continued to be one of Khánh's biggest embarrassments".

== Rule ==
As with the Minh junta, Khánh's ascension resulted in the replacement of a large number of province and district chiefs, causing disruption to the functioning of the government. Khánh initially appointed some pro-Diệm officials who had been relieved by Minh, but after protests from Buddhists, who decried what they saw as a reversion to Diệmism, Khánh stopped this practice, and removed some of the Diệm supporters that he had reappointed. He then jailed some Diệm supporters. Khánh installed some officers based on loyalty rather than competency as he feared a coup. This compounded the already problematic lack of trained civil servants, a problem that had existed since the French era. Khánh adopted some of Diệm's conservative social policies, reinstating the ban on dancing "The Twist". Karnow wrote that Khánh as leader "...spent most of his time maneuvering against internal rivals, with the result that he neglected his administrative duties, which bored him anyway".

By 1964, the United States was giving South Vietnam aid worth some $2 million per day, yet owing to rampant corruption in the government most South Vietnamese civil servants were paid late if at all. The ambitious plans for "rural pacification" which called for the United States to provide free medical care, new wells, and ultimately hydroelectricity in the rural areas collapsed in 1964 as the money intended for "rural pacification" was instead stolen by corrupt officials. As it was repeatedly promised that with American assistance South Vietnam would be soon making the transition from a Third World to a First World country, the collapse of the "rural pacification" schemes left many ordinary people disillusioned. Khánh promised McNamara during his visit that he would put South Vietnam on a "war footing" by mobilizing the entire male population of military age to fight against the Vietcong. Khánh passed a national service law which in theory would have conscripted all South Vietnamese men of military age, but he never fully implemented it, blaming "complicated bureaucratic procedures" left over from French rule. In fact, Khánh came under pressure from the many wealthy South Vietnamese families to spare their sons from being drafted, and to keep their support, Khánh provided many exemptions in his national service law to allow the sons of middle and upper-class families from being conscripted. The way in which the burden of conscription fell only upon the sons of poorer families made Khánh unpopular with the poor who complained about the way in which the sons of better off families escaped military service.

The activist Buddhist leader Thích Trí Quang continued to criticise Khánh and accused him of jailing Buddhists. Khánh was in a quandary, as he could be perceived as being too soft on Diệm supporters, or being vindictive towards Roman Catholics. To placate Trí Quang, Khánh agreed to remove all Roman Catholic chaplains from the military. Khánh sentenced Major Đặng Sỹ, the Roman Catholic officer who had overseen the Huế Vesak shootings of Buddhists protesting Diệm's ban on the Buddhist flag on 8 May 1963 to a life sentence of hard labour, and sentenced Diệm's younger brother, Ngô Đình Cẩn, the de facto warlord of central Vietnam, to death. This occurred over the private objections of US Ambassador Henry Cabot Lodge Jr., who thought that it was best for Khánh to take a mild line to dampen religious tensions. Cẩn was executed by firing squad on 9 May. Thích Trí Quang remained critical of what he saw as a lack of vigour on the part of Khánh in removing Diệmists from positions of authority.

Khánh had no prior political experience and turned to Lodge for advice. Lodge advised him to pursue a policy of inclusion of the various groups in Vietnamese society, and Khánh followed this counsel. Upon American advice, Khánh tried to generate a popular rapport by engaging in Western-style political campaigning and community meetings. He frequently flew around the countryside, meeting peasants, shaking hands and making speeches. In August, he became the first leader of South Vietnam to tour the central coast; Diệm had never bothered to visit the public. He made appearances on the streets of Saigon, speaking to the by passers and asking them for their opinions on the state of the nation. However, Khánh remained hesitant on democracy, saying, "we cannot achieve full democracy for some time, perhaps for another generation or two". Lodge agreed and privately said that the war effort had to come first, and thus a police state, curtailment of civil rights and crackdowns on opposition politicians were reasonable in order to effectively counter the communists. During this time, Khánh's régime suffered several military setbacks, such as the Battle of Long Dinh.

In March, Khánh began privately advocating that the US attack jungle areas in Laos and North Vietnam near the border with South Vietnam to stop communist infiltration, saying that it was pointless to keep fighting defensively within the country without taking the initiative to stop incoming forces. Khánh made plans with conservative Laotian General Phoumi Nosovan for anti-communist incursions into eastern Laos, but the Americans stopped him and leaked false reports to the media that he was reluctant to attack. As a result, Khánh concluded that a military victory might not be feasible and one of his officials made contacts with the communists to see if negotiation was possible, but nothing came of this approach.

In July, Khánh called for the expansion of the war into North Vietnam. At a rally on 19 July in Saigon that attracted around 100,000 people, he said that the "Communists are the aggressors, not us ... If we were to go back to the north, it should be termed a counterattack." He symbolically took soil from two containers representative the divided nation, and mixed them together to promote his reunification plan, under anti-communist rule. He said, "We have often heard that the people have called for the war to be carried to the North ... The government cannot remain indifferent before the firm determination of all the people who are considering the push northward as an appropriate means to fulfil out national history." He then led the demonstrators in shouting, "To the North" repeatedly. Khánh's call for an invasion of North Vietnam, deeply worried President Johnson, who feared an invasion of North Vietnam would cause a war with China in the same way that the approach of U.S. forces upon the Yalu river caused China to intervene in the Korean War in 1950. Johnson told Khánh that he should focus on "pacifying" his own country and the United States was opposed to his plans to invade North Vietnam. In a radio broadcast, the North Vietnamese leader Ho Chi Minh mocked Khánh for his "sheer stupidity", sneeringly asking "How can he talk about marching north when he cannot even control areas in the immediate vicinity of Saigon?" At the time, the US had no ambassador in Saigon, as Lodge had returned home to campaign for the Republican Party's presidential nomination, and his successor, Maxwell Taylor, was yet to arrive. When Taylor arrived, the US tried to publicly distance itself from Khánh's demands to invade North Vietnam and to downplay it, as it wanted to portray the communists as the only aggressors and that they had no intentions of going on the attack in any form, but they were sympathetic to his sentiment. Privately, they did not rule out a policy along Khánh's line.

In part, the American reluctance to escalate was due to the impending elections and a desire to not scare the electorate. In a meeting with Ambassador Taylor, Khánh assured the American envoy that his was a political gesture that should be seen as a show. However, it spread to the government-moderated press, and some generals expressed similar sentiments. Khánh then told Taylor that he had to allow Southerners to express their aspirations to unify Vietnam on their own terms and that plans were being explored. He thus refused to publicly renege from his calls for an attack on North Vietnam. In August, the Vietnam War expanded with the Gulf of Tonkin incident, a disputed encounter between North Vietnamese and American naval vessels in which Washington accused the communists of attacking their boats in international waters. Khánh publicly called on the Americans to strike back in order to project a strong image and avoid resembling a "paper tiger".

US President Lyndon Johnson was given more military powers as a result of the incident. After the second incident (which is believed to have been false), Johnson replied with air strikes, which Khánh praised. Seeing the tense situation as an opportunity to concentrate more power in his hands, Khánh declared a state of emergency on 7 August, empowering the police to ban protests, search properties under any circumstances and arbitrarily jail "elements considered as dangerous to national security". He imposed censorship to stop "the circulation of all publications, documents, and leaflets considered as harmful to public order". Taylor reported to President Johnson that Khánh regime was "an ineffective government beset by inexperienced ministers who are also jealous and suspicious of each other"." However, Taylor despite his doubts, advised Johnson that Khánh was the best leader for South Vietnam at the present and to change the leadership again would be a "disaster".

=== Vũng Tàu Charter ===
Khánh drafted a new constitution, known as the "Vũng Tàu Charter", which would have augmented his personal power and hamstrung Minh of what authority he had left. However, this only served to weaken Khánh as large demonstrations and riots broke out in the cities, with the Buddhists prominent, calling for an end to the state of emergency and the new constitution. Thích Trí Quang thought that, as Khánh would not use his power to remove Diệmists, it was merely an expression of megalomania. Some of the riots were sectarian, resulting in several deaths. Information Ministry buildings and radio stations were set on fire.

During one protest in which thousands of people were chanting "down with military dictatorship", Khánh confronted the crowd and joined the opposition in their shouting, claiming that he was not what they claimed him to be, rather than cracking down on them. Fearing he could be toppled by the momentum of the protests, Khánh asked Quang, Chau and Minh to hold talks with him at Vũng Tàu on 24 August. They refused and Khánh had to go to Saigon to try to get them to stop protesting against him, demonstrating his weakness. They asked him to repeal the new constitution, reinstate civilian rule, and remove Cần Lao members from power. They asked Khánh to announce these measures publicly, else they would organize a widespread movement of passive resistance. US Ambassador Maxwell Taylor recommended that Khánh ignore the demands, as he regarded the Buddhist activists as a minority group, but Khánh thought to dampen religious tensions by agreeing to the Buddhist proposals. Khiêm claimed "Khánh felt there was no choice but to accept, since the influence of Trí Quang was so great that he could not only turn the majority of the people against the government but could influence the effectiveness of the armed forces".

Needing support to stay afloat, Khánh released a communiqué after the meeting, promising to revise the constitution, liberalise the press, permit protests and start special courts to look into past grievances. This prompted more protests by activists and Khánh responded with wider concessions, which he convinced the Military Revolutionary Council to assent to. Under this plan, the new constitution would be repealed, and the MRC would dissolve itself. He then paid US$300,000 to Buddhist groups in return for their public endorsement, which Khánh publicly used to highlight his support. In return, Khánh promised to create a National Assembly within a year. Many senior officers decried what they viewed as a handing of power to the Buddhist leaders, who alleged that the concessions were playing into the hands of neutralists, easing the pressure on communist activities.

== Junta infighting ==
Khánh's concessions sparked opposition from Khiêm and Thiệu, both Catholic. They tried to remove him in favour of Minh, and they recruited many officers into their plot. Khiêm and Thiệu sought out Taylor and sought a private endorsement for a coup against Khánh, however the US ambassador did not want any more changes in leadership, fearing a corrosive effect on the government. This deterred Khiêm's group from staging a coup.

The division among the generals came to a head at a meeting of the MRC on 26/27 August. Khánh claimed that the government instability was due to troublemaking by Đại Việt members, whom he accused of putting partisan plotting ahead of the national interest and the struggle against the communists. Khiêm blamed Khánh's weakness in dealing with Buddhist activists as the reason for the demonstrations in the cities and the rural losses against the communists. Thiệu and General Nguyễn Hữu Có, also a Catholic, called for the replacement of Khánh with Minh, but the latter refused. Minh reportedly claimed that Khánh was the only one who would get funding from Washington, so they support him, prompting Khiêm to angrily declare that "Obviously, Khánh is a puppet of the US government, and we are tired of being told by the Americans how we should run our internal affairs". Feeling under pressure after the condemnations of his colleagues, Khánh said that he would resign. However no remedy was formulated and another meeting was convened.

After more arguing between the senior officers, they agreed that Khánh, Minh, and Khiêm would rule as a triumvirate for two months, until a new civilian government could be formed. The trio then brought paratroopers into Saigon to end the rioting. However, the triumvirate did little else due to the lack of unity in the ruling triumvirate. Khánh dominated the decision-making and sidelined Khiêm and Minh. He also released many of the rioters who had forced him to back down on his powergrab and liberalised the press after more anti-government protests. US military commander William Westmoreland deplored the concessions Khánh made to political opponents and began to lobby Washington to allow him to attack North Vietnam, saying that Khánh could not survive. He gained some support among Johnson's advisors, but the president resisted the pressure.

== Attempted coup by Generals Phát and Đức and further instability ==
In September 1964, Khánh dismissed General Lâm Văn Phát as Interior Minister, while General Dương Văn Đức was about to be removed as IV Corps commander. Both were removed as known Diệmists due to pressure from Buddhist activists. Disgruntled, the pair launched a coup attempt before dawn on 13 September, using ten army battalions that they had recruited. They took over the city without any firing, and used the national radio station to proclaim the deposal of Khánh's junta. Phat said that he would use the ideology and legacy of Diệm to lay the foundation for his new junta. There was little reaction from most of the military commanders.

However, Phát and Đức could not apprehend Khánh, who had escaped the capital and flew to the central highlands resort town of Đà Lạt. American officials flew after Khánh to encourage him to return to Saigon and reassert his control. He refused to do so unless the Americans publicly announced their support for him to the nation. They then asked Khánh about his plans for the future, but felt that he was directionless. After talking to Phát and Đức, they concluded the same, thus deciding to publicly release a statement through the embassy endorsing Khánh. This helped deter ARVN officers from joining Phát and Đức, who decided to give up. Khánh returned to Saigon and put down the putsch, aided mainly by the Vietnamese Air Force, under the leadership of Air Marshal Nguyễn Cao Kỳ, whose political star began to rise. Kỳ had Air Force jets flew over the headquarters of the coup leaders while threatening to bomb them if they did not surrender immediately. Khánh imprisoned Lam and Đức for two months. He then removed three of the four corps commanders and six of the nine division commanders for failing to move against Lam and Đức. The Secretary of State, Dean Rusk, sent a message to Taylor to deliver to Khánh stating: "The United States has not provided massive assistance to South Vietnam, in military equipment, economic resources, and personnel in order to subsidize continuing quarrels among South Vietnamese leaders.

On 19/20 September, an armed revolt by Montagnards serving in the armed forces took place. The indigenous paramilitaries took control of four military camps in Darlac Province, killing 70 ARVN troops of Vietnamese ethnicity, and then taking a number of others and their US advisers hostage. However, the Americans eventually convinced the Montagnards to stop, after Khánh made concessions. On 20 September, the Vietnamese Confederation of Labor and their 300,000 members staged a general strike for two days, causing electricity in the cities to be cut for two days. This prompted Khánh to make concessions to laborers. This was followed by other protests and riots in some cities, the largest being in the southern coastal town of Quy Nhơn where the public service stopped functioning for a short period. In some areas of I Corps, the commanders were not disturbed by the unrest so they did nothing to stop them.

Ambassador Maxwell Taylor deplored the repeated concessions, saying that "Khánh contributes further to the atmosphere of weakness that increasingly surrounds him" and that he "has survived only by making virtually unending concessions to every pressure group that has presented itself. There is general recognition that such a process cannot continue indefinitely and still have anything left deserving the name of a government. We are now close to that stage".

Khánh and his generals created a semblance of civilian rule by creating the High National Council, an appointed advisory body. He put Minh in charge of picking the 17 members of the group, and he filled it with figures sympathetic to him. They then made a resolution to recommend a model with a powerful head of state, which would likely be Minh. Khánh did not want his rival taking power, so he and the Americans convinced the HNC to dilute the powers of the position so as to make it unappealing to Minh, who was then sent on an overseas diplomatic goodwill tour.

The HNC, which covered a wide cross-section of different social groups, selected the aging Phan Khắc Sửu as chief of state, and Sửu selected Trần Văn Hương as Prime Minister, a position with greater power, but the generals and Khánh retained the real power. At the same time, a group of Catholic officers was trying to replace Khánh with Thiệu. Hương took a firm line against the Buddhists, accusing Thích Trí Quang of being a Communist, who in turn charged Hương with being a Diệmist, and responded with mass protests against the new civilian administration, calling for its removal. Huong used the army to break up the demonstrations, resulting in violent confrontations.

By the end of the year, Khánh had sidelined Khiêm and Minh. He despatched Khiêm to Washington as the ambassador with Thảo, his main confidant, as his press attaché. In late December 1964, Khánh summoned Thảo back to Saigon. Thảo suspected Khánh was attempting to have him killed, while Khánh thought Khiêm and Thảo were plotting against him. Fearing he would be arrested upon arrival, Thảo went underground upon returning to Saigon. In mid-January 1965, Khánh called for Thảo to report to his superiors in the ARVN, warning that he would be "considered guilty of abandoning his post with all the consequences of such a situation" if he failed to do so.

Khánh and a group of younger officers called the "Young Turks", led by Kỳ and Thiệu wanted to forcibly retire officers with more than 25 years of service, as they thought them to be lethargic and ineffective. Most of the older officers had more experience under the French colonial era, and some of the younger men saw them as too detached from the new era.

One of the aims of this was to remove Generals Đôn, Minh, Kim and Xuân, who Khánh had put under arrest after his January coup but had now released and put into meaningless desk jobs with no work to do, although they were still being paid. According to Khánh and the "Young Turks", the group, led by Minh, who had returned from his overseas tour, had been making plots with the Buddhists to regain power. Sửu's signature was required to pass the ruling, but he referred the matter to the HNC.

The HNC turned down the request, which was speculated to be due to the fact that many of them were themselves old, and did not appreciate the negative attitude towards seniors; some South Vietnamese called the HNC the High National Museum. On 19 December, a Sunday, the generals dissolved the High National Council, a civilian advisory body. In any case, the HNC had already ceased to function in a meaningful way, as only 9 of the 17 members were still occasionally attending its meetings.

=== Deposal of the High National Council ===
Before dawn, there were troop movements in the capital, as the junta deposed the civilians. The operation was commanded by Thi, who had travelled into Saigon from I Corps, and Kỳ. The national police, which was under the control of the army, moved through the streets, arresting five HNC members and other politicians and student leaders they deemed to be an obstacle. Minh and the other older generals were arrested and flown to Pleiku, a Central Highlands town in a Montagnard area, while other military officers were simply imprisoned. They arrested around 100 members of the National Salvation Council of Lê Khắc Quyến, a new party active in central Vietnam with an anti-war ideology, aligned with Thi and Thích Trí Quang. As Thi was active in the purge, it was believed that the Quyến had fallen out with Thi in I Corps. At this point, Khánh had not spoken up and allowed the impression that the moves have been against his will, and a move on the part of other officers to take power for themselves. Huong had actually privately endorsed the dissolution of the HNC, as both he and the Young Turks thought it would allow them to gain more power and thus influence over Khánh.

=== Falling out with the Americans ===
The infighting exasperated Maxwell Taylor, the US ambassador to South Vietnam and former Chairman of the US Joint Chiefs of Staff, who felt that the disputes between the junta's senior officers were derailing the war effort. Only a few days later Westmoreland had invited him and the generals to a dinner and asked for an end to the changes in leadership, which Khánh and his men assured would be the case. Westmoreland warned them that persistent instability would turn American political and public opinion against Saigon, fearing it would be useless to support such a regime. Initially Taylor issued a thinly disguised threat to cut aid, releasing a public statement saying that Washington might reconsider its military aid if "the fabric of legal government" was not reinstated.

Taylor summoned the generals to his office, and Khánh sent Thi, Kỳ, Thiệu and Vice Admiral Cang, the commander of the navy. He asked the four to sit down and then asked "Do all of you understand English?". The ambassador then angrily denounced the generals. According to Stanley Karnow, Taylor "launched into a tirade, scolding them as if he were still superintendent of West Point and they a group of cadets caught cheating". He said "I told you all clearly at General Westmoreland's dinner we Americans were tired of coups. Apparently I wasted my words." He decried the removal of the HNC as "totally illegal" and said that "... you have made a real mess. We cannot carry you forever if you do things like this." Taylor believed that the HNC was an essential part of the governance of the country, because as an American, he believed that civilian legitimacy was necessary. He declared that if the military did not transfer some powers or advisory capacity to the HNC or another civilian institution, then aid would be withheld, and some planned military operations against the Ho Chi Minh trail that was being used to infiltrate communists into the south would be suspended.

The four officers were taken aback by Taylor's searing words and felt that they had been humiliated. A decade after the incident, Kỳ wrote that Taylor was "the sort of man who addressed people rather than talked to them", referencing the confrontation. Karnow said that "For the sake of their own pride, they [the officers] resented being treated in ways that reminded them of their almost total dependence on an alien power. How could they preserve a sense of sovereignty when Taylor, striving to push them into 'getting things done', behaved like a viceroy?" Thi was seen by a CIA officer soon after, grinning. When asked why he was happy, Thi said "Because this is one of the happiest days of my life ... Today I told the American ambassador that he could not dictate to us."

Khánh's quartet of delegates responded to Taylor by responding in a circumlocutory way. They remained calm and did not resort to direct confrontation. Kỳ said the change was necessary, as "the political situation is worse than it ever was under Diệm". Kỳ explained that the situation mandated the dissolution of the council, saying "We know you want stability, but you cannot have stability until you have unity". He claimed that some HNC members were disseminating coup rumors and creating doubt among the population and that "both military and civilian leaders regard the presence of these people in the High National Council as divisive of the Armed Forces due to their influence". Kỳ then promised that he would explain the decision at a media conference and that he and his colleagues would return to their military roles in the near future. Thiệu said "I do not see how our action has hurt the Hương government ... Hương now has the full support of the Army and has no worries from the High National Council, which we have eliminated". When Taylor said that the moves detracted from Hương and Sửu's powers, the generals disagreed, and said that they supported the pair in full and that Hương had approved of the deposal of the HNC. Taylor was unimpressed by the reassurances, saying at the meeting's end, "I don't know whether we will continue to support you after this ... [Y]ou people have broken a lot of dishes and now we have to see how we can straighten out this mess".

Taylor met Hương and urged the prime minister to reject the dissolution of the HNC. Hương said that he and Suu had not been notified of the moves, but agreed to step in to take over the work of the body. Taylor asked Hương to publicly condemn the deposal of the HNC and to call on the army to release those arrested in the coup. Hương said he would be willing to reorganize his administration to the wishes of the military. Taylor warned that the US did not agree with military rule as a principle, and might reduce aid, but Hương was unmoved and said that the Vietnamese people "take a more sentimental than legalistic approach" and that the existence of civilian procedure and the HNC was much less pressing than the "moral prestige of the leaders". American military advisers and intelligence officers who liaised with senior junta members found out that they were unconcerned with any possible legal ramifications of their actions.

Later, the quartet called a media conference, where they maintained that the HNC had been dissolved in the nation's interest and vowed to stand firm and not renege on their decision, although they proclaimed their ongoing confidence for Sửu and Hương. Two days later, went public in support of the coup against the HNC, condemning the advisory body and asserting the army's right to step into government matters if "disputes and differences create a situation favorable to the common enemies: Communism and colonialism." They announced that they had formed a new body called the Armed Forces Council.

The day after the press conference, Taylor met Khánh in a private meeting at the latter's office. He complained about the dissolution of the HNC and said that it did not accord with the values of the alliance and the loyalty that Washington expected of Saigon. Khánh replied that Vietnam was not a satellite of Washington and compared the situation to the US support of a coup against Diệm, saying that loyalty was meant to be reciprocated. Taylor then bemoaned Khánh, saying he had lost confidence in him. Taylor added that military supplies being shipped to Vietnam would be withheld after arriving at Saigon and that American help in planning and advising military operations would be suspended.

Khánh bristled and said that "You should keep to your place as Ambassador ... as Ambassador, it is really not appropriate for you to be dealing in this way with the commander-in-chief of the armed forces on a political matter, nor was it appropriate for you to have summoned some of my generals to the Embassy yesterday." He threatened to expel Taylor, who said that his forced departure would mean the end of US support for South Vietnam. However, Khánh later said he was open to the possibility of going abroad and asked Taylor if he thought this would be good for the country, to which the ambassador replied in the affirmative. Khánh ended the meeting, saying that he would think about his future.

Later, Khánh phoned Taylor from his office and expressed his desire to resign and go abroad along with several other generals, asking for the Americans to fund the costs of travel. He then Taylor the list of generals for whom arrangements needed to be made, and then asked the ambassador to repeat the names for confirmation. Taylor did so, unaware that Khánh was taping the dialogue. Afterwards, Khánh played back the tape out of context to his colleagues, giving them the impression that Taylor was calling for them to be expelled. Khánh asked his colleagues to participate in a campaign of fomenting anti-American street protests and to give the impression that the country did not need aid from Washington.

On 22 December, Khánh went back on his promise to leave the country and announced on Radio Vietnam that "We make sacrifices for the country's independence and the Vietnamese people's liberty, but not to carry out the policy of any foreign country". He said it was "better to live poor but proud as free citizens of an independent country rather than in ease and shame as slaves of the foreigners and Communists". Khánh explicitly denounced Taylor in an interview published in the New York Herald Tribune on 23 December saying "if Taylor did not act more intelligently, Southeast Asia would be lost", and that the US could not expect to succeed by modelling South Vietnam on American norms. He added that Taylor's "attitude during the last 48 hours-as far as my small head is concerned—has been beyond imagination". Justifying the removal of the HNC, Khánh said they were "exploited by counter-revolutionary elements who placed partisan considerations above the homeland's sacred interest". Taylor responded by stating that generals had participated in "improper interference" into the purview of civilian government, while embassy staff said that their head had done nothing improper, as did the State Department, effectively again threatening to cut aid.

On 24 December, he issued a declaration of independence from "foreign manipulation", and condemned "colonialism". At the time, Khánh was also secretly negotiating with the communists, hoping to put together a peace deal so he could expel the Americans from Vietnam, although this did not lead anywhere in the two months before Khánh was eventually forced from power.

Khánh's defiance of Taylor saw his approval rise among the fellow generals, as the ambassador's actions were seen as being an insult to the nation. On the night of 23 December, Khánh convinced his colleagues to join him in lobbying Hương to declare Taylor persona non grata and expel him from South Vietnam. They were confident that Hương could not reject them and side with a foreign power at the expense of the military that installed him, and made preparations to meet him the next day. However, someone in the junta was a CIA informant and reported the incident, allowing representatives of Washington to individually lobby the officers to change their stance. The next day, the generals changed their mind and when they called on Huong at his office, only called on him to formally denounce Taylor's behaviour in his meeting with Khánh and his quartet and to "take appropriate measures to preserve the honor of all the Vietnamese armed forces and to keep national prestige intact". On the same day, the Việt Cộng bombed the Brinks Hotel, where United States officers were billeted. As a result, there was a suspicion among a minority that Khánh's junta had been behind the attack, even though the Viet Cong had claimed responsibility through a radio broadcast. When the Americans started making plans to retaliate against North Vietnam, they did not tell Khánh and his junta.

As a result of these tensions, a standoff started between the Americans and the Vietnamese generals. The US had hoped the generals would relent because they could not survive without aid from Washington, and that they would not be able to repel the communists or rival officers without bending to receive support. On the other hand, Khánh hoped the Americans would become more worried about the communists first and acquiesce to their fait accompli against the HNC.

The South Vietnamese eventually had their way. Seeing that the generals and Hương were not willing to reinstate the HNC Taylor sent General John Throckmorton to meet the generals to mend fences. Throckmorton told the Vietnamese generals that they had read too much into Taylor's comments and that the US had no intention of pressuring them out of power. Khánh appeared reassured by this and made a public statement on 30 December, saying he was not as hostile to the Americans as reported, and he wanted Thiệu and Cang to meet the Americans to relieve any tension that remained. The generals eventually won out, as the Americans did not move against them in any way for their refusal to reinstate the HNC.

The only concession the AFC made was on 6 January, when they made the ostensible move of officially renouncing all their power to Hương, who was asked to organize elections. They also agreed that a new appointed civilian body would be created in the meantime and that those arrested in December would be released. This resulted in an official announcement by Hương and Khánh three days later, in which the military again reiterated their commitment to civilian rule through an elected legislature and a new constitution, and that "all genuine patriots" would be "earnestly assembled" to collaborate in making a plan to defeat the communists. The Americans were unimpressed with the statement, which was shown to Taylor before it was made public; the State Department dourly announced that "it appears to represent some improvement to the situation".

The South Vietnamese won in large part because the Americans had spent so much on the country, and could not afford to abandon it and lose to the communists over the matter of military rule, as it would be a big public relations coup for the Soviet bloc. According to Karnow, for Khánh and his officers, "their weakness was their strength". An anonymous South Vietnamese government official said "Our big advantage over the Americans is that they want to win the war more than we do."

In late January 1965, Buddhist protests against Prime Minister Hương broke out across South Vietnam, and were at their largest in central Vietnam in I Corps. In Huế, matters degenerated into a riot as 5,000 demonstrators attacked the US Information Service Library and burned 8,000 books. Khánh and Thi turned a blind eye to the rioting and destruction of property. It was believed that they did so to allow the disorder to ruin the Hương government and allow them to inherit power.

Khánh decided to have the armed forces take over the government, and remove Hương. On the morning of 27 January, Khánh staged a bloodless putsch with the support of Thi and Kỳ. He promised to leave politics once the situation was stabilized and hand over power to a civilian body. It was believed some of the officers supported Khánh's return to power so that it would give him an opportunity to fail and be removed permanently. Khánh persisted with the facade of civilian government by retaining Sửu and replacing Huong with the economist Nguyễn Xuân Oanh.

== Downfall ==
Between January and February 1965, Thảo began plotting against Khánh. Thảo consulted Kỳ, who wanted to seize power for himself before the plot, and exhorted him to join the coup, but Kỳ claimed he would remain neutral. Shortly before noon on 19 February, Thảo used tanks and infantry to seize control of the military headquarters at Tân Sơn Nhứt, the post office and the radio station of Saigon. He surrounded Khánh's home, and Sửu's residence. When spotted by the press, he emerged from a tank to quip that the "operation is to expel Nguyên Khánh from the government". Thảo said he was going to bring Khiêm back from his post as Ambassador to the US, catching Khiêm asleep in his Maryland home, off-guard. When informed of what was happening, Khiêm sent a cable pledging "total support" to the plot.

The country was still seeking stability, with Phan Huy Quát having been appointed prime minister just three days earlier. Khánh managed to escape and flee to Vũng Tàu. His plane lifted off from Tân Sơn Nhứt Air Base just as rebel tanks were rolling in, attempting to block the runway. Thảo made a radio announcement stating that the sole objective of his military operation was to get rid of Khánh, whom he described as a "dictator". Thảo did this in league with General Lâm Văn Phát, who was supposed to seize the Biên Hòa Air Base to prevent Kỳ from mobilising air power against them. Phát and others made pro-Diệm announcements, saying "[Lodge] ... was wrong in encouraging the coup against Diệm rather than correcting mistakes".

The attempt to seize Biên Hòa failed, and Kỳ circled Tân Sơn Nhứt, threatening to bomb the rebels. Most of the forces of the III and IV Corps surrounding the capital disliked both Khánh and the rebels, and took no action. At 20:00, Phát and Thảo met with Kỳ in a meeting organised by the Americans, and insisted that Khánh be removed from power. The coup collapsed when, around midnight, loyal ARVN forces swept into the city from the south and some loyal to Kỳ from Biên Hòa in the north. Whether the rebels were genuinely defeated or a deal was struck with Kỳ to end the revolt in exchange for Khánh's removal is disputed. Before fleeing, Thảo broadcast a message stating that the coup had been effective in removing Khánh. This was not the case, but the chaos led the Armed Forces Council to adopt a vote of no confidence in Khánh the following day. This motion was precipitated by Thi, who gained the support of Kỳ, and the final vote was unanimous. Kỳ assumed control of a junta that continued with Suu and Quat as a civilian front, although General Trần Văn Minh was the nominal head as Commander in Chief of the armed forces. Khánh was then north of Saigon, inspecting a display of captured communist weapons. When he heard what was happening, he refused to accept his fate and used his personal aircraft to fly to different provinces, trying to rally support, promising to promote those which would be natural allies, but received little support. Having ousted Khánh, the generals made a press conference in the afternoon, but claimed that no decision had been definitively made.

By the end of the evening, he was in Đà Lạt when his plane had no fuel left, and no pumps were open at the time, so he was marooned there for the night. Fearing a Khánh comeback, the AFC met again and unanimously resolved to make contingency plans to repel any counter-insurrection by Khánh. Westmoreland sent Colonel Wilson, Khánh's former confidant, to go to the military airport at Đà Lạt to convince the Vietnamese general to resign and allow a new military leadership to take the reins. Khánh finally agreed to leave if he was given a dignified send-off, so the other generals arranged a ceremony at Tan Son Nhut, where military bands serenaded him. He theatrically bent down and picked up some loose dirt before putting it in his pocket, saying that he was taking his beloved homeland with him. His enemies, the remaining Vietnamese officers and Taylor, all met him at the airport. He then left as Ambassador-at-Large, and was sent on a world tour, starting with a report at the United Nations in New York City.

== Life in exile ==
After the demise of South Vietnam, Khánh lived in France for a time. In 1977, he relocated to the United States with his family. There, he worked for several businesses owned by Vietnamese-Americans. When Karnow interviewed him in 1981, Khánh was working as the manager of what Karnow called a "shabby" Vietnamese restaurant located on a "tawdry boulevard" in West Palm Beach, Florida.

Khánh remained active in anti-communist circles within the Vietnamese diaspora. On 2 January 2005, he became the "Chief of State" of the Government of Free Vietnam, an organization located in "Little Saigon" (Westminster, California). He held that position until his death.

== Personal life ==
Khánh and his wife Nguyễn Lê Trần (née Phạm) had six children and one stepdaughter; one son died in a drowning accident in South Vietnam.

== Awards and decorations ==
- National Order of Vietnam, Grand Cross/Grand Officer
- Gallantry Cross of South Vietnam
- Legion of Honour (France)
- Croix de Guerre 1939–1945 (France)
- War Cross for Foreign Operational Theatres (France)
- Medal for the War Wounded (France)
- Parachutist Badge (South Vietnam)
- Parachutist Badge (United States)

Political offices
Preceded by Dương Văn Minh	Chairman of the Military Revolutionary Council; 1964	Succeeded by Phan Khắc Sửu
Preceded by Nguyễn Ngọc Thơ	Prime Minister of the Republic of Vietnam; 1964	Succeeded by Trần Văn Hương
Preceded by Nguyen Huu Chanh	Government of Free Vietnam; 2005–2013	Succeeded by Vacant
