= Nguyễn Lưu Viên =

South Vietnamese doctor and politician (1919–2017)

Doctor Nguyễn Lưu Viên
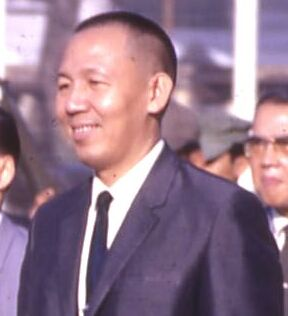
- Dr. Viên in 1967

Deputy Prime Minister of South Vietnam
- In office 1 September 1969 – 14 April 1975 Serving with Phan Quang Đán (1974–1975)
- Prime Minister: Trần Thiện Khiêm (until 4/4 1975); Nguyễn Bá Cẩn (4/4-14/4 1975)
- Preceded by: Trần Thiện Khiêm
- Succeeded by: Dương Kích Nhưỡng; Trần Văn Đôn
- In office 13 July 1966 – 28 October 1967 Serving with Nguyễn Hữu Có
- Prime Minister: Nguyễn Cao Kỳ
- Preceded by: Nguyễn Văn Thiệu; Trần Văn Đỗ; Trần Văn Tuyên
- Succeeded by: Phạm Đăng Lâm
- In office 4 November 1964 – 16 February 1965 Serving with Nguyễn Xuân Oánh
- Prime Minister: Trần Văn Hương; Nguyễn Xuân Oánh (acting)
- Preceded by: Đỗ Mậu; Nguyễn Tôn Hoàn
- Succeeded by: Nguyễn Văn Thiệu; Trần Văn Đỗ; Trần Văn Tuyên

Minister of Internal Affairs of South Vietnam
- In office 4 September 1964 – 14 February 1965
- Prime Minister: Nguyễn Khánh (1964); Trần Văn Hương (1964–1965); Nguyễn Xuân Oánh (acting; 1965)
- Preceded by: Lâm Văn Phát
- Succeeded by: Nguyễn Hòa Hiệp

Personal details
- Born: 21 November 1919 Trà Vinh province, Cochinchina, French Indochina
- Died: 18 September 2017 (aged 97) Springfield, Virginia, U.S.
- Party: National Social Democratic Front
- Other political affiliations: Bloc for Liberty and Progress (1960–1963)
- Spouse: Nguyễn Thị Trinh
- Children: 3 sons
- Parents: Nguyễn Thành Phương (father); Trần Thị Ngọc (mother)
- Relatives: Nguyễn Khánh (nephew)
- Education: Hanoi Medical University (M.D.)

Nguyễn Lưu Viên (Vietnamese pronunciation: [ŋwiən˦ˀ˥ liw˧˧ viən˧˧]; 21 November 1919 – 18 September 2017) was a South Vietnamese doctor and politician who served as Deputy Prime Minister of South Vietnam under various prime ministers. He also served as Minister of Internal Affairs of South Vietnam under Prime Ministers Nguyễn Khánh and Trần Văn Hương.

== Biography ==
He was born on 21 November 1919 to a wealthy family in Trà Vinh province. In 1945, while he was studying medicine at the Hanoi Medical University to obtain his M.D., he joined the Viet Minh in their resistance to the French. However, after realizing more of the group's communist nature he left the group and continued focusing on his studies. and worked as a doctor before entering politics.

=== First Republic ===
Under the regime of President Ngô Đình Diệm, in 1954, he held the position of Head of the General Commission for Refugees, which he helped with the influx of refugees from the North after Vietnam was partitioned into two separate countries. In April 1960, he was one of the signatories of the Caravelle Manifesto, a document critiquing the government of President Ngô Đình Diệm and demanding reforms be made within the government.

=== Fall of Saigon and life in exile ===
As South Vietnam was on the verge of collapsing to the advancing forces of North Vietnam Viên left for Guam on 29 April, a day before the government of General Dương Văn Minh announced South Vietnam's surrender on 30 April 1975 to the Communist regime. After arriving in Guam, Viên was then relocated to Camp Pendleton along with other Vietnamese refugees. Afterward, Viên decided to further his studies in Oklahoma before deciding to relocate to Union City, Tennessee where he worked as a doctor at Baptist Memorial Hospital for 11 years. In 1988, he retired and then relocated to Virginia where he would live out the remainder of his life.

He died at his home at the age of 97 in Springfield, Virginia on 18 September 2017.
