= Madame Khánh =

Widow of Nguyễn Khánh

Phạm Lê Trần
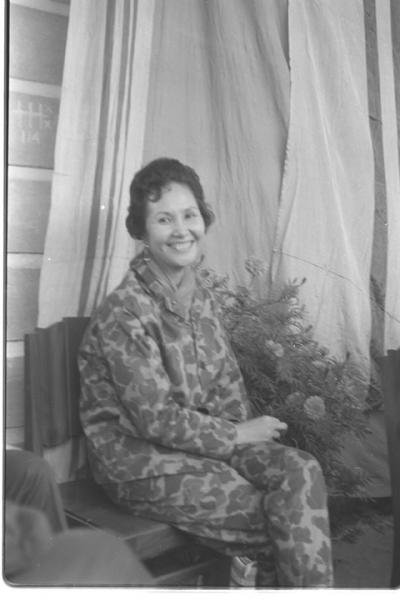
- Madame Khánh in Saigon

Personal details
- Born: Hanoi, French Indochina
- Spouse: Nguyễn Khánh
- Children: 6

Nguyễn Lê Trần (née Phạm), also known as Madame Khánh, is the widow of Nguyễn Khánh, a former South Vietnamese army general and politician who served as Prime Minister and Chief of State of South Vietnam from 1964 to 1965. As the spouse of the Chief of State of South Vietnam, she visited hospitals to give moral support to wounded soldiers and also accompanied her husband on numerous engagements at state affairs.

== Departure from South Vietnam ==
On 25 February 1965, she accompanied her husband on his new assignment as Ambassador-at-Large and were sent on a world tour, starting with her husband's report at the United Nations in New York City.

== Exile ==
Since leaving South Vietnam in February 1965, she has lived in the United States and when her husband completed his report to the United Nations they moved to Paris. In 1977, she moved to the United States with her husband and six of their children.

In 1991, she accompanied her husband on an official visit to the Special Economic Zones of the People's Republic of China.

== Family ==
She had seven children (six with her late husband); one of whom died in a swimming pool accident in South Vietnam, in 1963.
