= Nguyễn Tôn Hoàn =

South Vietnamese doctor and politician (1917–2001)

Doctor Nguyễn Tôn Hoàn
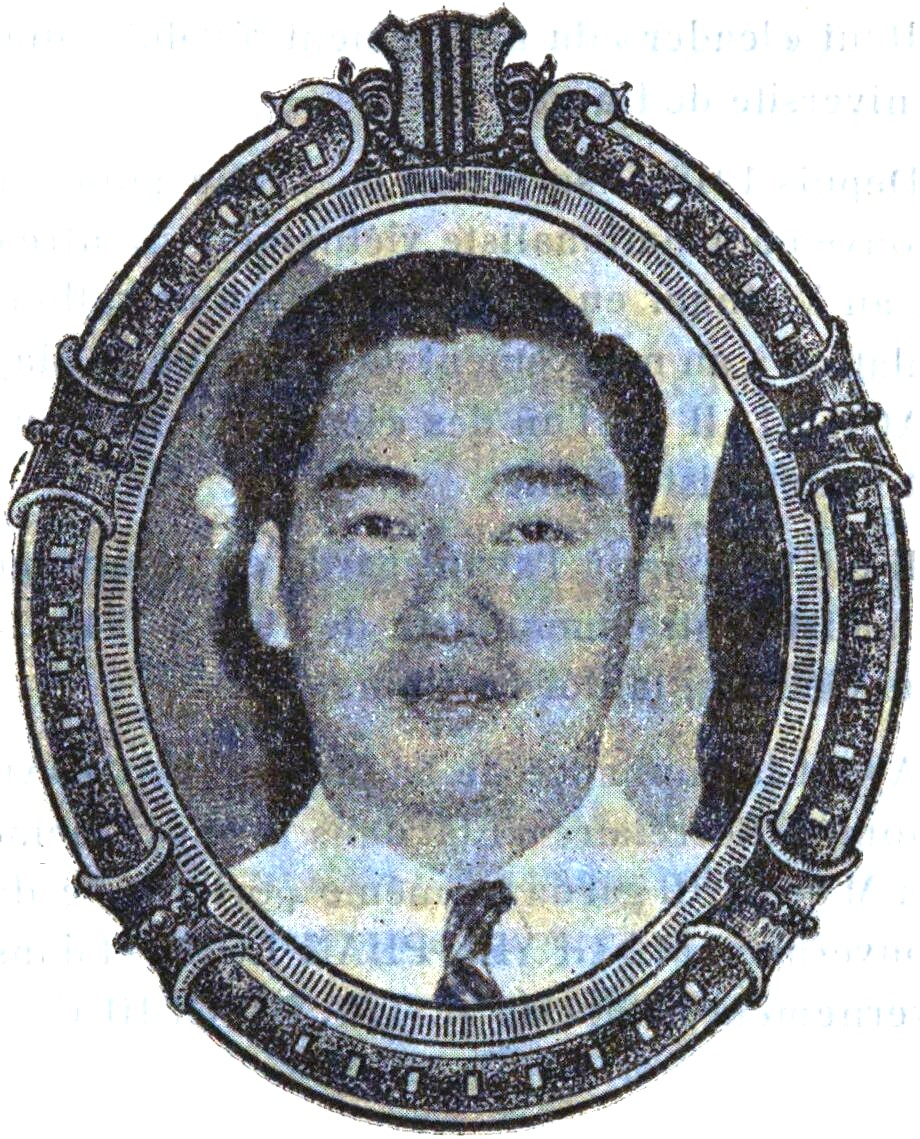
- Official portrait, 1950

Deputy Prime Minister of South Vietnam
- In office 8 February 1964 – 1 September 1964 Serving with: Đỗ Mậu; Nguyễn Xuân Oánh
- Prime Minister: Nguyễn Khánh
- Preceded by: Position established
- Succeeded by: Nguyễn Lưu Viên

Personal details
- Born: 1 May 1917 Tây Ninh, Cochinchina, French Indochina
- Died: 19 September 2001 (aged 84) Mountain View, California, U.S.
- Party: Nationalist Party of Greater Vietnam
- Other political affiliations: National Social Democratic Front (Big tent affiliation)
- Spouse: Phan Thị Bình
- Children: 4 (2 sons; 2 daughters)
- Education: University of Hanoi

Dr. Nguyễn Tôn Hoàn (Vietnamese pronunciation: [ŋwiən˦ˀ˥ ton˧˧ hwaːn˨˩]; 1 May 1917 – 19 September 2001) was a South Vietnamese Catholic politician, originally a physician, who led the Đại Việt Quốc Dân Đảng (Nationalist Party of Greater Vietnam) from the 1940s to the 1960s. He was active in South Vietnamese politics during that time, serving briefly as Deputy Prime Minister in 1964.

== Early career ==
He was born in Tây Ninh province, Vietnam on 1 May 1917. He studied medicine at the University of Hanoi, where he became involved in student politics. In 1939, he helped found the Đại Việt Quốc Dân Đảng (Nationalist Party of Greater Vietnam).

When the Việt Minh gained a foothold over northern Vietnam in 1946, he fled to China, then under the rule of Chiang Kai-shek's nationalist Kuomintang, hiding under the deck of a junk. Hoàn returned to Saigon — where the Việt Minh did not exercise the tight control they possessed in the north—in 1947 to continue his political activism.

In mid-1947, he joined forces with Ngô Đình Diệm, later to become the first President of South Vietnam. A fellow Catholic, Diệm was a former provincial governor in the 1930s and the younger brother of Ngô Đình Khôi, another provincial leader slain by the communists. For the rest of the year, the pair tried to organise anti-communists into a new nationalist body known as the Vietnam National Alliance (VNA). Both wanted to build a Third Force for Vietnam, that avoided communism on one hand and colonialism on the other. Hoàn's Đại Việt and Diệm's power base generated some momentum.

According to Hoàn and Diệm, the objective of the purpose of the VNA was to mobilise support for a new political movement under Bảo Đại, who had been forced to abdicate by the Việt Minh during the August Revolution and went into overseas exile. Bảo Đại then tried to recruit politicians such as Hoàn to provide him with a conduit to power. The French also wanted to work with Bảo Đại so that he would lend more legitimacy to their colonial presence in Vietnam.

In 1949, the French appointed Bảo Đại as head of state of the State of Vietnam, an associated state in the French Union, which meant limited autonomy under the French umbrella. Hoàn's Đại Việt initially cooperated with Bảo Đại, hoping Vietnam would move towards increased autonomy and eventual independence. Hoàn was Minister of Youth and Sports in two early cabinets of Bảo Đại, and he introduced ping pong to Vietnam. In contrast, Diệm angrily denounced the State of Vietnam as a French sham and refused to help Bảo Đại, ending the Vietnam National Alliance. However, Hoàn concluded the State of Vietnam would not lead to lasting change, so he and the Đại Việt withdrew.

In late 1953, Ngô Đình Nhu, younger brother and chief adviser to Diệm, organised a Unity Congress, a forum of various anti-communist nationalists such as Hoàn's Đại Việt, the Đại Việt Quốc Dân Đảng and Diệm's followers. Nhu's objective was to gain publicity for Diệm. Hoàn agreed to participate, and the conference turned into chaos, but Nhu achieved his objective of gaining publicity for his brother and staging angry denunciations of Bảo Đại.

== Exile ==
In 1954, Diệm was appointed prime minister by Bảo Đại. In the first year, Diệm's government was unstable as various groups including the Hòa Hảo and Cao Đài religious sects and the Bình Xuyên organised crime syndicated vied for power. After his attempt to take power failed, he fled to France. Diệm banned the Đại Việt and forced its leaders into exile or hiding. In a speech on 7 July 1963, the ninth anniversary of his appointment as Prime Minister of the State of Vietnam, Diệm made a speech assailing "fascist ideologues disguised as democrats [who] were surreptitiously seeking to revive and rekindle disunity at home while arousing public opinions against us abroad", widely interpreted as a reference to Hoan's Đại Việt. In November 1963, General Dương Văn Minh led a coup against Diệm, resulting in the assassination of the president. However, three months later, General Nguyễn Khánh deposed Minh in a bloodless coup.

== Power ==
Khánh and some of his co-conspirators were regarded as being pro-Đại Việt and summoned Hoàn back to become prime minister, although he only heard of the offer on a radio. Hoàn had remained active while in Paris, publishing a magazine and keeping up to speed with political developments in Vietnam. He tried to manipulate politics through subordinates. Khánh wanted to use Hoàn to harness Đại Việt support for his regime, which backfired. Hoàn failed to form a government as prime minister when he returned. The Đại Việt had fractured into too many warring factions for him to enlist enough support, and other political hopefuls resented the return of old guard politicians from exile to take power, and they refused to cooperate.

Khánh decided to act as both Prime Minister and Chairman of the reorganised Military Revolutionary Council. Hoàn was appointed as the first Deputy Prime Minister in charge of rural pacification. He was given control of five ministries including the Interior, National Defense and Rural Affairs and two special commissions, which were primarily engaged in consolidating the strategic hamlets of Ngô Đình Nhu into the renamed New Rural Life Hamlets.

Hoàn lobbied for an Ethnic Minorities Ministry, anti-corruption drives, land reform, and free elections with a transition to civilian rule. This put him increasingly in conflict with the junta and the Americans, who were more interested in turning Khánh into a strong leader to fight the communists. Gradually, the generals squeezed Hoàn out of control of rural pacification, while the Đại Việt leader still sought an opportunity to become prime minister. Hoàn lost his weekly Sunday radio slot. U.S. officials believed Khánh needed to make regular speeches to establish political support among the populace. The general agreed and took over Hoàn's slot.

Feeling marginalised, Hoàn began to undermine the Khánh regime. He publicly accused Khánh and the United States of ignoring him, and began to join forces with their critics. In mid-June 1964, Roman Catholic demonstrations broke out, in response to protests by Buddhists. Hoàn covertly supported some of the more vigorous Catholic agitators, who accused Khánh and Ambassador Henry Cabot Lodge Jr. of "fomenting religious discrimination" against Catholics by the Buddhist majority. Hoàn tried to mobilise support among Dai Viet members and supporters among the officer corps, in an attempt to overthrow Khánh. However, the conspiracy never got off the ground, as the plotters feared that the Americans would support their regime if they managed to take power, making it impossible for them to rule.

== Later life ==
In September, Khánh forced Hoàn to resign. The Đại Việt leader went to Japan and then returned to France. In 1965, Hoàn had a dispute with French President Charles de Gaulle over the country's Vietnam policy and immigrated to the U.S. Hoàn taught Vietnamese at American military complexes and later opened a Vietnamese restaurant in Mountain View, California. He continued his political activism against the Vietnamese communist government.

== Death ==
Hoàn died on 19 September 2001, in Mountain View, California at age 84. He had been married to Phan Thi Binh. The couple had two sons and three daughters.
