= Nguyễn Xuân Oánh =

Vietnamese economist and politician (1921–2003)

Professor Nguyễn Xuân Oánh
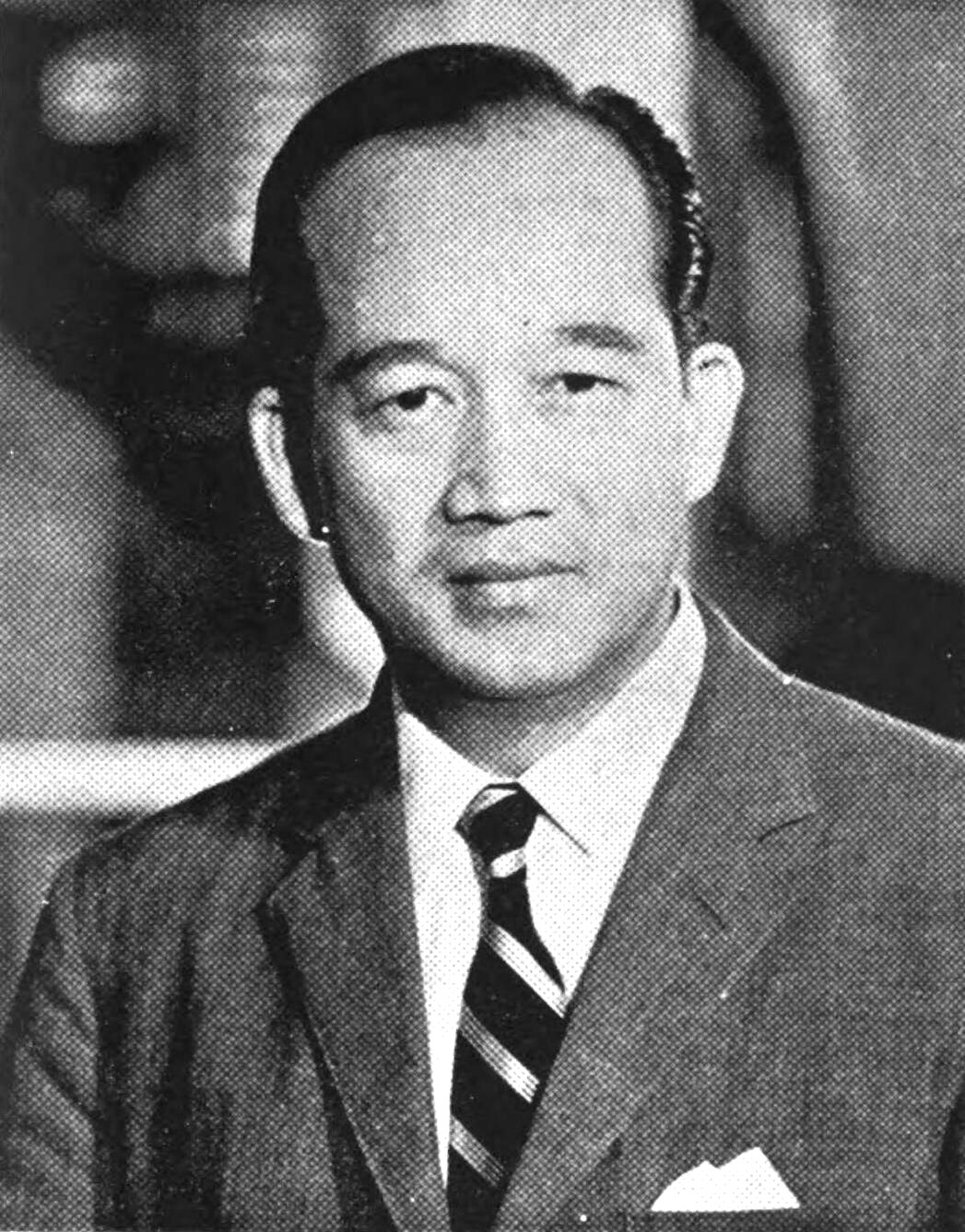
- Dr. Oánh in 1969

Economic advisor to the Prime Minister of Vietnam
- In office 1991–1997
- Prime Minister: Võ Văn Kiệt

Member of the National Assembly
- In office 17 June 1987 – 18 September 1992
- Constituency: Ho Chi Minh City
- Chairman: Lê Quang Đạo

Member of the Presidium of the Central Committee of the Vietnamese Fatherland Front
- In office 17 June 1987 – 18 September 1992
- Constituency: Ho Chi Minh City
- Chairman: Phạm Văn Kiết

Economic advisor to the General Secretary of the Communist Party of Vietnam
- In office 1986 – 1991; Personal advisor (1980 – 1986)
- General Secretary: Nguyễn Văn Linh

Prime Minister of South Vietnam Acting
- In office 28 January 1965 – 16 February 1965
- Chief of State: Phan Khắc Sửu
- Preceded by: Trần Văn Hương
- Succeeded by: Phan Huy Quát
- In office 29 August 1964 – 3 September 1964
- Head of State: Dương Văn Minh
- Preceded by: Nguyễn Khánh
- Succeeded by: Nguyễn Khánh

Deputy Prime Minister of South Vietnam
- In office 8 February 1964 – 16 February 1965 Serving with: Đỗ Mậu (1964); Nguyễn Tôn Hoàn (1964); Nguyễn Lưu Viên (1964–1965); Nguyễn Văn Thiệu (1965)
- Prime Minister: Nguyễn Khánh; Trần Văn Hương
- Preceded by: Position established
- Succeeded by: Trần Văn Đỗ; Trần Văn Tuyên

Governor of the National Bank of Vietnam
- In office 8 February 1964 – 10 February 1965
- Prime Minister: Nguyễn Khánh; Trần Văn Hương
- Preceded by: Nguyễn Ngọc Thơ
- Succeeded by: Trần Văn Khiêm

Personal details
- Born: 14 July 1921 Phủ Lạng Thương, Tonkin, French Indochina
- Died: 29 August 2003 (aged 82) Ho Chi Minh City, Vietnam
- Party: Independent
- Other political affiliations: National Social Democratic Front (Big tent affiliation; until 1975)
- Spouse: Thẩm Thúy Hằng
- Children: Nguyễn Thanh Vũ (son); Nguyễn Xuân Dũng (son); Nguyễn Xuân Ái Quốc (son); Nguyễn Xuân Quốc Việt (son)
- Relatives: Nguyễn Xuân Bái (father)
- Education: Lycee Albert; National College of Japan; Kyoto University (BA); Harvard University (MA, PhD)
- Occupation: Economist Politician
- Nickname: "Jack Owens"

Nguyễn Xuân Oánh (Vietnamese: [ŋwiən˦ˀ˥ swən˧˧ ʔwajŋ̟˧˦]; 14 July 1921 – 29 August 2003), nicknamed Jack Owens, was a Vietnamese economist and politician who held senior positions in the governments of both South Vietnam and the current Socialist Republic of Vietnam.

== Early life and education ==
He was born on 14 July 1921 in Phủ Lạng Thương, today Bắc Giang, Tonkin, French Indochina. His father is Doctor Nguyễn Xuân Bái, from Đa Ngưu village, Văn Giang district, Hưng Yên province. He was educated in Western studies since at a young age. His family sent him to Paris, France to be educated at Lycee Albert. After graduating from secondary school, Oánh went on to attain a bachelor's degree in economics at the National College of Japan in 1944. Afterwards he would go on to earn his MA at Kyoto University of Japan in 1950. He would go on to pursue his PhD in economics from Harvard University of the US in 1954.

== Career in South Vietnam ==
After earning a PhD in economics, Oánh worked for the World Bank Group's IFC and the IMF and taught economics at Trinity College. In 1963, he returned home to South Vietnam and joined the government. Shortly after, he was appointed Governor of the South Vietnamese Central Bank, then Deputy Prime Minister of the Republic of Vietnam. He also served as acting Prime Minister of South Vietnam in 1964 and 1965.

== After the Fall of Saigon ==
Unlike most senior leaders of the former South Vietnamese government, Oánh and his family remained in Sài Gòn (Hồ Chí Minh City) after the Fall of South Vietnam in 1975. While senior government officials and military officers of the former Saigon government that stayed behind often endured punishment, either facing execution or being sent to a Communist reeducation camp run by the new Communist government, Oánh was spared from either fates. Instead, he was simply monitored by the new government.

He was also one of the few intellectuals of the former Republic of Vietnam who was well respected by the new Ho Chi Minh City government, led by Mr. Võ Văn Kiệt. Oánh was elected to the National Assembly of the Socialist Republic of Vietnam in 1987 and was appointed a member of the Presidium of the Central Committee of the Vietnamese Fatherland Front.

He also served as an economic adviser to Prime Minister Võ Văn Kiệt and Communist Party's General Secretary Nguyễn Văn Linh during the Đổi Mới economic reforms.

== Honor ==
Dr. Nguyễn Xuân Oánh was awarded the Order of the Rising Sun (3rd Class Honor marked by Gold Rays with Neck Ribbon) in November 1997, becoming the first Vietnamese citizen to receive this award. He was awarded the Harvard Centennial Medal in 1999 by the Harvard Graduate School of Arts and Sciences.

== Personal life ==
He was married to Thẩm Thuý Hằng, a famous actress and pageant who was awarded the title of Merited Artist of Vietnam. They have twin sons, Nguyễn Xuân Ái Quốc and Nguyễn Xuân Quốc Việt, who owned the coffee chain The Coffee Factory in Ho Chi Minh City.

Political offices
Preceded by Position established	Deputy Prime Minister of the Republic of Vietnam; 1964–1965	Succeeded by: Trần Văn Đỗ; Trần Văn Tuyên
Preceded by Nguyễn Khánh	Prime Minister of the Republic of Vietnam; 1964	Succeeded by Nguyễn Khánh
Preceded by Trần Văn Hương	Prime Minister of the Republic of Vietnam; 1965	Succeeded by Phan Huy Quát
