= Équipe Féminine de Cai-Vôn =

Women football club in Vietnam

- Full name: Câu lạc bộ bóng đá nữ Cái Vồn
- Founded: 1933; 93 years ago
- Dissolved: 1938; 88 years ago

Équipe Féminine de Cai-Vôn (Vietnamese: Câu lạc bộ bóng đá nữ Cái Vồn) was a women's football club based in Vĩnh Long, Vietnam.

Founded around 1932–1933, they were the first women football club ever in Vietnam and Asia.

== History ==
In 1932 or 1933, Phan Khắc Sửu, an agricultural engineer from France, returned to Vietnam and founded the Cái Vồn women's football team. The club recruited almost 30 women footballers who are single to join the team, three managers were also appointed to coach the players. On 2 July 1933, the first match between two women teams took place between Cai Von and Xom Chai - the second ever women team in Vietnam. In the same month, at Mayer Stadium, Cai Von played a friendly match against men's team Paul Bert who previously won the Saigon Second Division, they ended up with a 2–2 draw. In 1938, due to a lack of young players and as many members began to get married, the club was dissolved.

== See also ==
- Football in Vietnam
