= Phan Khắc Sửu =

South Vietnamese politician (1893–1970)

Phan Khắc Sửu 潘克丑
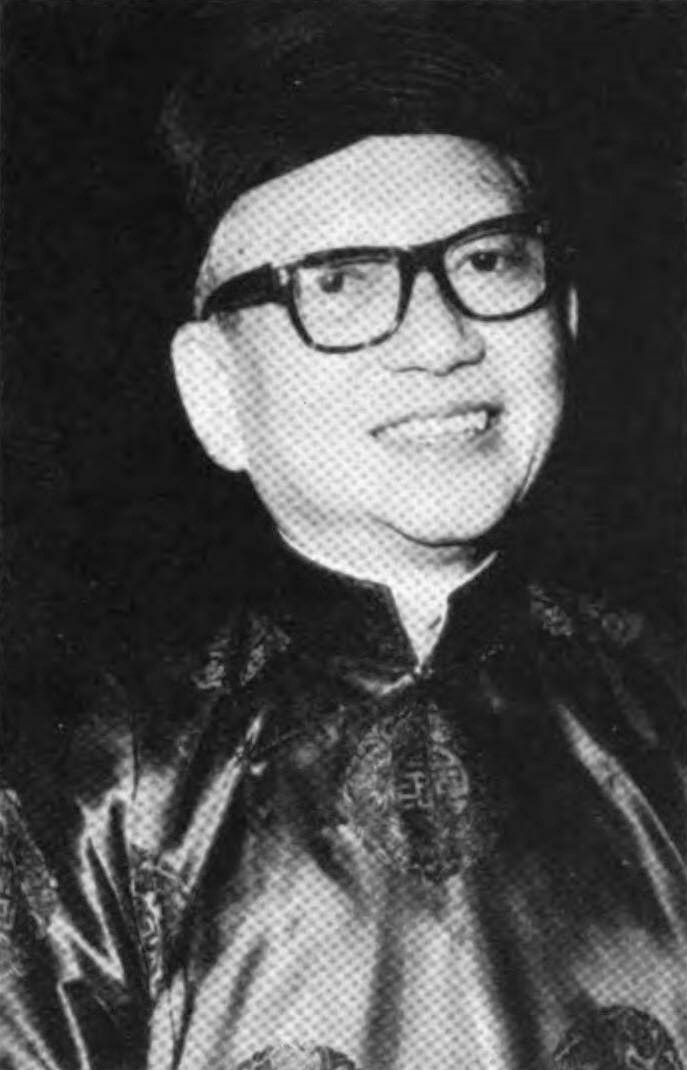
- Sửu in 1964

Chief of State of South Vietnam
- (De jure)
- In office 26 October 1964 – 12 June 1965
- Prime Minister: See list: Himself (26/10–03/11 1964; Acting); Trần Văn Hương (04/11 1964–01/1965); Nguyễn Xuân Oánh (01–02/1965; Acting); Phan Huy Quát (02–06/1965)
- Preceded by: Dương Văn Minh (as Chairman of the Military Revolutionary Council)
- Succeeded by: Nguyễn Văn Thiệu (as Chairman of the National Leadership Committee)

Chairman of the High National Council
- In office 27 September 1964 – 26 October 1964
- Secretary-General: Trần Văn Văn
- Preceded by: Position established
- Succeeded by: Nguyễn Xuân Chữ (acting)

Prime Minister of South Vietnam Acting
- In office 26 October 1964 – 3 November 1964
- Chief of State: Himself
- Preceded by: Nguyễn Khánh
- Succeeded by: Trần Văn Hương

Minister of Agriculture of the State of Vietnam
- In office 6 July 1954 – 24 September 1954
- Prime Minister: Ngô Đình Diệm
- Preceded by: Nguyễn Trung Vinh
- Succeeded by: Nguyễn Công Hầu
- In office 14 July 1949 – 21 February 1951
- Prime Minister: Bảo Đại (1949–1950); Nguyễn Phan Long (1950); Trần Văn Hữu (1950–1951)
- Preceded by: Trần Thiện Vàng
- Succeeded by: Nguyễn Trí Độ

Personal details
- Born: 9 January 1893 Cần Thơ province, Cochinchina, French Indochina
- Died: 24 May 1970 (aged 77) Saigon, South Vietnam
- Party: Vietnamese Democratic Socialist Party (since 1948)
- Spouse: Lê Thị Tiểu
- Children: 5 (3 sons; 2 daughters)
- Education: Université Ez-Zitouna; Sorbonne University (BS)
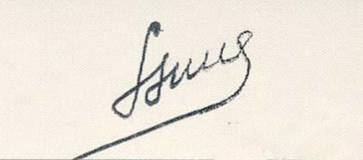
- Signature

Phan Khắc Sửu (Vietnamese: [faːn˧˧ xak̚˧˦ siw˧˩]; chữ Hán: 潘克丑 9 January 1893 – 24 May 1970) was a South Vietnamese engineer and politician who served as a minister in Bảo Đại's government of the State of Vietnam and as a civilian Chief of State of the Republic of Vietnam from 1964–65 during the rule of the various military juntas.

== Early life and career ==
He was born on 9 January 1893, to a family of landowners in Mỹ Thuận village, An Trường canton, Cái Vồn district, Cần Thơ province, French Indochina. He was a founding member of the Cao Đài religion. His Cao Đài name was Huỳnh Đức.

In 1914, he studied abroad in Tunis and then in Paris, France, where he obtained a degree in agricultural engineering.

After returning home, he worked as the political affairs officer of the Department of Economic and Technical Research in Cochinchina since 1930. However, the same year, he joined to support the Student Movement against the government's colonial policy. He helps initiated the Revolutionary Movement for the Unification of the People of Annam. In 1933, he founded the Équipe Féminine de Cai-Vôn, the first ever women's football team in Vietnam and Asia. In 1940, he joined and worked actively in the Vietnamese People's Revolutionary Party, a political organization that worked for Vietnam's independence. Therefore, he was sentenced to eight years of hard labor by the colonial government of Indochina Governor General Jean Decoux and imprisoned on Côn Đảo.

After the Japanese coup d'etat of France on 9 March 1945, he was released and returned to the mainland. He and Doctor Phạm Ngọc Thạch founded the Vietnam National Independence Party in Saigon, an anti-French political organization with Japanese support. He also joined the Dan Quy newspaper as the party's spokesman.

When the French recaptured the South, he expressed non-cooperation with both the French and Viet Minh authorities. In 1948, he joined the Vietnamese Democratic Socialist Party, a political party with a majority of Hòa Hảo followers, advocating the Bảo Đại solution. With this support, when Bảo Đại's government was established in 1949, he was appointed Minister of Agriculture.

In early 1954, the State of Vietnam Prime Minister Nguyễn Phúc Bửu Lộc invited him to be a Minister again, but he refused, accepting only to participate in the National Conference in the Sub-Committee on Independent Research of Vietnam.

== Political career ==
=== First Republic of Vietnam (1955-1963) ===
After Ngô Đình Diệm established the Republic of Vietnam and became President, Sửu repeatedly sent letters demanding and advising President Diệm to make reforms and changes of policy within the government. As a result, he was labeled by Diệm's government to be a "political opposition."

In August 1959, he was elected as a member of the National Assembly representing the Saigon constituency. The election resulted in an overwhelming victory for the Diệm regime with many Pro-Diệm deputies winning seats in the National Assembly. Sửu and fellow Deputy Phan Quang Đán were the only opposition candidates who won their respective contests. He then joined the Great National Solidarity Front with Nguyễn Tường Tam to oppose the government. On 26 April 1960, he and 17 dignitaries signed the proclamation, later known as the "Caravelle Manifesto," criticizing the government's mistakes and demanding that the President make reforms in policies. This made him become a thorn in the eyes of the government. On the occasion of the failed coup on 11 November 1960, he was accused of supporting the coup by the government and imprisoned. On the night of 11 July 1963, he was sentenced to eight years in prison by a special military court in Saigon along with Phan Quang Đán, Vũ Hồng Khanh, and Bùi Lương. When defending himself in court, he said: "If I am guilty, then I only have one crime, which is to expel the French from Saigon, sin for the sake of the Nation!"

On 31 July 1963, he was exiled to Côn Đảo Prison to serve his sentence. However, only 3 months later, another coup broke out, overthrowing and assassinating President Diệm, he was released from prison and returned to Saigon.

=== Chief of State of the Republic of Vietnam (1964-1965) ===
After the "Three Heads" crisis, on 8 September 1964, he was invited to the National Synod by the Provisional Leadership Committee (the Three Heads). On 27 September, the Synod elected Sửu as president. He presided over the Synod that drafted the 20 October 1964 Covenant to replace the 4 November 1963 Provisional Charter, which placed power in the hands of the military to relinquish power and national sovereignty to elected representatives. On 24 October, he was nominated by the Synod for the position of chief of state.

After taking office as chief of state on 26 October 1964, on 4 November 1964, he appointed teacher and former Mayor of Saigon Trần Văn Hương as prime minister; he was the second civilian prime minister since the First Republic of President Ngô Đình Diệm was overthrown by the rebels. However, Trần Văn Hương's government was quickly paralyzed by the opposition of many circles as well as the lack of cooperation of the Military Council.

The crisis lasted for two months. On 18 December 1964, General Nguyễn Khánh led the young generals to establish the Military Council and two days later ordered the dissolution of the Synod. However, he was still retained as Head of State. On 27 January 1965, Prime Minister Hương was also forced to resign, handing over the prime minister's power to Deputy Prime Minister Nguyễn Xuân Oánh.

On 16 February 1965, General Nguyễn Khánh, in the name of Chairman of the Military Council, signed a decision to appoint Mr. Phan Khắc Sửu as the chief of state and to appoint Dr. Phan Huy Quát as the prime minister to establish a new government. Less than 10 days later, on 25 February 1965, General Nguyễn Khánh was deposed by a group of young generals and had to accept the position of ambassador-at-large abroad. Less than four months later, on 5 June 1965, Prime Minister Phan Huy Quát's civilian government was dissolved by the Military Council. The young generals formed a National Leadership Council and appointed Lieutenant General Nguyễn Văn Thiệu as chief of state. On 12 June 1965, Sửu and Prime Minister Phan Huy Quát officially left their positions of chief of state and prime minister.

Famous for his integrity, as chief of state, he only eats meals provided by the government, and his salary is transferred to the social welfare fund for the people. In particular, Sửu's wife, Lê Thị Tiểu, who is also a Cao Đài believer with the name Cao Đài name Huỳnh Điệp, refuses to sit in the position of Madame, equivalent to First Lady. Rather, she sells clothes at Vườn Chuối Market in District 3 to pay for her life and care for her children and grandchildren.

=== Second Republic of Vietnam (1967-1975) ===
In 1966, he returned to political activities, was once again elected a member of the National Assembly, and was elected Chairman of the National Assembly. In 1967, Sửu became a candidate for president in the 1967 South Vietnamese presidential election. He finished third with 513,374 votes (10.8%). The joint venture of two generals Nguyễn Văn Thiệu - Nguyễn Cao Kỳ, prevailed winning 1,649,561 of the votes (34.8%). The National Assembly of the Republic of Vietnam met and voted, with 58 votes in favor and 42 votes against certifying the election. After this incident, Sửu resigned in protest of the military junta gaining the presidency that had a democratic name but could not reverse the situation. Fed up, he withdrew from politics.

In 1968, he, together with several dignitaries such as Nguyễn Thành Vinh and Trần Sinh Cát Bình founded the Vietnamese New People Movement.

== Death ==
Sửu died on 24 May 1970 in Saigon. He was given a state funeral and posthumously honored with the National Order of Vietnam.

Political offices
Preceded by Trần Thiện Vàng	Minister of Agriculture of the State of Vietnam; 1949-1951	Succeeded by Nguyễn Trí Độ
Preceded by Nguyễn Trung Vinh	Minister of Agriculture of the State of Vietnam; 1954	Succeeded by Nguyễn Công Hầu
Preceded by Dương Văn Minh	Chief of State of the Republic of Vietnam; 1964-1965	Succeeded by Nguyễn Văn Thiệu
