= 1959 South Vietnamese parliamentary election =

Parliamentary elections were held in South Vietnam on 30 August 1959, resulting in an overwhelming victory for President Ngô Đình Diệm and the government. The regime won all but two of the 123 seats in the National Assembly, taken by five pro-government political parties and pro-government independent candidates. The elections allowed some liberalization in terms of freedom of speech, but the Diệm regime continued to maintain rigid control over the election process. Despite considerable efforts in preventing a small number of opposition candidates from standing during the election through the use of army soldiers bussed in to stuff ballot boxes to support the pro-government candidates, two independent candidates from the opposition were elected – Phan Quang Đán and Phan Khắc Sửu. However, during the first inaugural session of the National Assembly, Đán and another independent deputy, Nguyễn Trân were not permitted to attend and were arrested and charged with electoral fraud. The election as a whole was described by a 1966 CIA report as the "dirtiest and most openly rigged" of all South Vietnamese elections.

== Electoral system ==
The 123 members of the National Assembly were elected by first-past-the-post voting in single-member constituencies. Candidates were not required to be residents of the constituencies in which they ran. Most constituencies were roughly equal in population, although Saigon was only allotted nine seats (7% of the total) despite being home to about 14% of the national population.

== Results ==
Party	Seats
National Revolutionary Movement	78
Vietnamese Socialist Party	4
Social Democratic Party	3
Vietnamese Restoration Party	2
Democratic Liberties Party	2
Pro-government independents	32
Opposition independents	2
Total	123
Source: Keesings Research Review

== Aftermath ==
Dan was regarded as a nationalist anti-communist who was one of the most able political figures in the country, and was elected by a 6-1 ratio over Diem's government candidate. This came despite 8,000 Army of the Republic of Vietnam soldiers being bussed from out of district to stuff ballot boxes.

Despite strong protests from the US and UK embassies, Diệm was adamant that Đán would not be able to take his seat. When the Assembly was inaugurated, Đán was confronted by police and put under arrest as he attempted to leave his medical clinic to attend the session. Đán was charged with electoral fraud, on the grounds that he supposedly offered free medical care to induce voters to support him. He also pointed out that if this were the case, then he would have run for election in the district in which his practice was located, to maximise the number of patients who were in his voting district.
