= Trần Văn Hương =

Penultimate President of South Vietnam in 1975

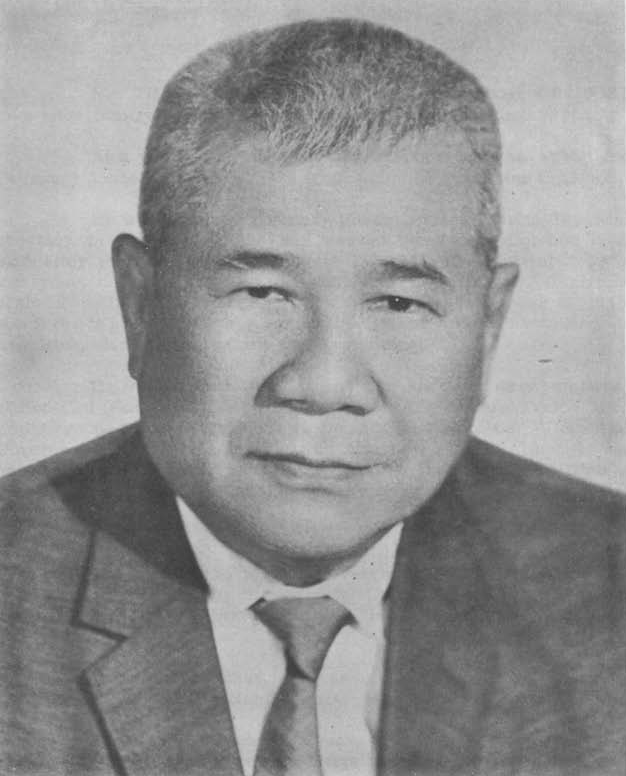
- Official portrait, 1971

3rd President of South Vietnam
- In office 21 April 1975 – 28 April 1975
- Prime Minister: Nguyễn Bá Cẩn
- Vice President: Vacant
- Preceded by: Nguyễn Văn Thiệu
- Succeeded by: Dương Văn Minh

3rd Vice President of South Vietnam
- In office 31 October 1971 – 21 April 1975
- President: Nguyễn Văn Thiệu
- Prime Minister: Trần Thiện Khiêm (1971–Apr. 1975); Nguyễn Bá Cẩn (Apr. 1975)
- Preceded by: Nguyễn Cao Kỳ
- Succeeded by: Nguyễn Văn Huyền

3rd and 7th Prime Minister of South Vietnam
- In office 25 May 1968 – 22 August 1969
- President: Nguyễn Văn Thiệu
- Deputy: Trần Thiện Khiêm
- Preceded by: Nguyễn Văn Lộc
- Succeeded by: Trần Thiện Khiêm
- In office 4 November 1964 – 27 January 1965
- Deputy: Nguyễn Xuân Oánh; Nguyễn Lưu Viên
- Chief of State: Phan Khắc Sửu
- Preceded by: Nguyễn Khánh
- Succeeded by: Nguyễn Xuân Oánh (acting); Phan Huy Quát

Minister of National Defense
- In office 4 November 1964 – 18 January 1965
- Prime Minister: Himself
- Preceded by: Nguyễn Khánh
- Succeeded by: Trần Văn Minh

Personal details
- Born: 1 December 1902 Long Châu commune, Châu Thành district, Vĩnh Long Province, French Cochinchina
- Died: 27 January 1982 (aged 79) Ho Chi Minh City, Vietnam
- Party: Independent
- Other political affiliations: National Social Democratic Front (Big tent affiliation); Renaissance Party (1953–1963)
- Spouse: Lưu Thị Triệu
- Children: 2
- Education: Collège Chasseloup-Laubat; Hanoi College of Education
- Profession: Educator; Politician

Trần Văn Hương (Vietnamese: [t͡ɕən˨˩ van˧˧ hɨəŋ˧˧]; 1 December 1902 – 27 January 1982) was a South Vietnamese politician who was the penultimate president of South Vietnam for a week in April 1975 before its surrender to the communist forces of North Vietnam. Before ascending to the presidency, he served as vice president under President Nguyễn Văn Thiệu since October 1971 after being elected on a joint ticket with Thiệu in the 1971 South Vietnamese presidential election. Prior to that, he was prime minister for three months from November 1964 to January 1965 under the supervision of a military junta led by General Nguyễn Khánh; during this time, there was widespread civil unrest from the Buddhist majority and power struggles with the military. He also served as prime minister again from May 1968 to August 1969.

== Biography ==
Hương was born into a poor Mekong Delta family and given as a baby to foster parents, and later became a schoolteacher. During the First Indochina War, Hương was known for his opposition to both the French Union and the communist-dominated Viet Minh that fought against them, and had a reputation for conservatism. He initially joined the Vietminh and led a band of 150 fighters in the Plain of Reeds before leaving as the communists took over. He refused to return to teaching under the French colonial framework and found work in a pharmacy. Known for riding his bicycle around town, he served as mayor of Saigon twice, the first of which was when he agreed to work with newly appointed Prime Minister Ngo Dinh Diem in 1954 after the partition of Vietnam, but like Diem, he was known for his inflexibility and the pair fell out several years later.

Later during the rule of Diệm, Hương was jailed in 1960 for three years for signing the Caravelle Manifesto that criticised Diệm. However, after Diệm was overthrown and assassinated in 1963, Hương gave a scathing analysis of the coup generals' action. He stated that "The top generals who decided to murder Diệm and his brother were scared to death. The generals knew very well that having no talent, no moral virtues, no political support whatsoever, they could not prevent a spectacular comeback of the president and Mr. Nhu if they were alive."

=== First prime ministership ===
On 26 September 1964, and due to US pressure, General Nguyễn Khánh and the senior officers in his military junta created a semblance of civilian rule by forming the High National Council (HNC), an appointed advisory body akin to a legislature.

The HNC, selected the aging civilian politician Phan Khắc Sửu as chief of state, and Sửu selected Hương as prime minister, a position that had greater power. However, Khánh and the senior generals retained the real power. At the time, both Saigon and Washington were planning a large-scale bombing campaign against North Vietnam in an attempt to stop support for the Vietcong (VC) insurgency, but were waiting for stability in the south before starting the air strikes. Known for his rigid attitude towards dissent, Hương stated in his first speech upon taking office that "There must be respect for public order, and there must be national discipline" and vowed to "clean and simplify" the government, and engage in "total war" against the communists. He took a firm line against the Buddhists, announcing restrictions on public protests, accusing Thích Trí Quang of being a communist, who in turn charged Hương with being a Diệmist, and responded with mass protests against the new civilian administration, calling for its removal. Hương used the army to break up the demonstrations, resulting in violent confrontations.

Khánh and some younger generals wanted to forcibly retire officers with more than 25 years of service, as they thought them to be lethargic and ineffective, but most importantly, rivals for power. Most of the older officers had more experience under the Vietnamese National Army during the French colonial era, and some of the younger men saw them as too detached from the modern situation. The HNC turned down the request to approve the policy. There was speculation the HNC did this as many of them were old, and therefore did not appreciate the generals' negativity towards seniors. On 19 December, a Saturday, the generals moved to dissolve the HNC by arresting some of its members. Hương did not speak up initially, but had actually privately endorsed the dissolution of the HNC, as both he and the "Young Turks" thought it would allow them to gain more power and influence over Khánh. The Americans were extremely angry with the generals' action, and when Ambassador Maxwell Taylor met Hương afterwards, he urged the prime minister to reject the dissolution of the HNC. Hương said he and Suu had not been notified of the moves, but agreed to step in and take over the body's work. Taylor nevertheless asked Hương to publicly condemn the coup and call on the army to release those arrested. Hương also said he would be willing to reorganize his administration to meet the wishes of the military, and that retaining their support was essential in keeping a civilian government functional. Taylor said the US did not agree with military rule as a principle, and might reduce aid, but Hương was unmoved and said the Vietnamese people "take a more sentimental than legalistic approach" and that the existence of civilian procedure and the HNC was much less pressing than the "moral prestige of the leaders".

Later, despite Taylor's pleas to keep the dissolution of the HNC secret in the hope it would be reversed, the younger generals called a media conference, where they maintained the HNC had been dissolved in the nation's best interests and proclaimed their ongoing confidence for Suu and Hương. Khanh and the younger generals had heated arguments with Taylor in private, before taking their disputes to the media. Defying Taylor earned Khánh heightened approval among his junta colleagues, as the ambassador's actions were seen as an insult to the nation. On the night of 23 December, Khánh convinced his fellow officers to join him in lobbying Hương to declare Taylor persona non grata and expel him from South Vietnam. They were confident Hương could not reject them and side with a foreign power at the expense of the military that had installed him. Khánh also told Hương that if Taylor was not ejected, he and the other generals would hold a media conference and release "detailed accounts" of the ambassador's confrontation with the quartet and his "ultimatum to General Khánh" the day after. However, someone in the junta was a CIA informant and reported the incident, allowing American officials to individually lobby the officers to change their stance. At the same time, the Americans informed Hương if Taylor was expelled, US funding would stop. The next day, the generals changed their mind and when they met Hương at his office, only asked him to formally denounce Taylor's behavior in his meetings with Khánh and his quartet and to "take appropriate measures to preserve the honor of all the Vietnamese armed forces and to keep national prestige intact".

As the generals and Hương were unwilling to reinstate the HNC, Taylor sent General John L. Throckmorton to meet them and mend relations, and the Vietnamese got their way. The South Vietnamese won in large part because the Americans had spent so much on the country, and could not afford to abandon it and lose to the communists over the matter of military rule, as a communist takeover would be a big public relations coup for the Soviet bloc. An anonymous South Vietnamese government official said "Our big advantage over the Americans is that they want to win the war more than we do." The only concession the military made was on 6 January 1965, when they made a charade move of officially renouncing all their power to Hương, who was asked to organize elections. They also agreed to appoint a civilian body and release those arrested in December. An official announcement was made by Hương and Khánh three days later, in which the military again reiterated their commitment to civilian rule through an elected legislature and a new constitution, and that "all genuine patriots" would be "earnestly assembled" to collaborate in making a plan to defeat the communists.

In January 1965, Hương introduced a series of measures to intensify the anti-communist war effort by expanding military expenditure using aid money and equipment from the Americans, and increasing the size of the armed forces by widening the terms of conscription. This provoked widespread anti-Hương demonstrations and riots across the country, mainly from conscription-aged students and pro-negotiations Buddhists. In Huế, matters degenerated into a riot as 5,000 demonstrators attacked the U.S. Information Service Library and burned 8,000 books. Khánh and I Corps commander General Nguyễn Chánh Thi turned a blind eye to the rioting and destruction of property. It was believed that they did so to allow the disorder to ruin the Hương government and allow them to inherit power. Reliant on Buddhist support, Khánh did little to try to contain the protests. Khánh then decided to have the armed forces take over the government. On 27 January, Khánh removed Hương in a bloodless putsch with the support of Thi and Air Vice-Marshal Nguyễn Cao Kỳ. He promised to leave politics once the situation was stabilized and hand over power to a civilian body. It was believed that some of the officers supported Khánh's increased power so that it would give him an opportunity to fail and be removed permanently. Khánh persisted with the facade of civilian government by retaining figurehead chief of state Phan Khắc Sửu and making economics professor Nguyễn Xuân Oánh the caretaker prime minister.

Khánh's deposal of the prime minister nullified a counter-plot involving Hương that had developed during the civil disorders that forced him from office. In an attempt to pre-empt his deposal, Hương had backed a plot led by some Đại Việt-oriented Catholic officers reported to include Generals Nguyễn Văn Thiệu and Nguyễn Hữu Có. They planned to remove Khánh and bring Khiêm back from Washington. The US Embassy in Saigon was privately supportive of the aim, but was not ready to fully back the move as they regarded it as poorly thought out and potentially a political embarrassment due to the need to use an American plane to transport some plotters, including Khiem, between Saigon and Washington. As a result, the Deputy Ambassador U. Alexis Johnson only promised asylum for Hương if necessary.

Khánh's deposal of Hương further heightened American opposition to him and fears that his reliance on Buddhist support would result in his not taking a hardline position against the communists. Aware that US support for him was further ebbing away, Khánh tried to initiate peace negotiations with the VC, but he only managed an exchange of letters and was yet to organize any meetings or negotiations before he was overthrown. In the meantime, this only intensified US efforts to engineer a coup, and many of Khánh's colleagues—mostly Catholic Đại Việt supporters—had by then privately concluded that he was set to pursue a deal with the communists.

Many of whom felt that Khánh thought of himself as the "Sihanouk of Vietnam"; the Cambodian monarch had managed to avoid the Cold War for the time being by shunning both communist and anti-communist blocs. During the first half of February, suspicions and evidence against Khánh began to solidify, an example being his order to release the wife of communist leader Huỳnh Tấn Phát from jail. Taylor's superiors in Washington began to align with his view, giving him more scope to agitate for a coup.

=== 1967 presidential election ===
In the 1967 South Vietnamese presidential election, Hương finished fourth with 474,100 votes (10.0%).

In May 1968, President Thiệu appointed Hương to the post of prime minister, replacing Nguyễn Văn Lộc. After a week of negotiations with Thiệu, Kỳ, various military officers and civilians, Hương assembled a cabinet with representation from a variety of interests but not members of the Đại Việt. Hương mostly favoured technocrats, keeping six of Loc's ministers in his 18-man cabinet. Hương also appointed himself the minister for Rural Development and Pacification, and stated upon taking office that "The life and death of this country depend on this government... We will do all we can to safeguard it."

In March 1969, Hương's military-escorted motorcade was taking him home for his lunch break when a man wearing a Vietnamese Rangers uniform approached and fired on a traffic policemen who was organising a clearing for Hương's convoy and an abandoned cyclo was pushed into the street. After an exchange of gunfire, Hương's convoy sped away and he eventually returned to his office after lunch. The assailant and another suspect were later arrested, and a Claymore mine and plastic explosives were found in the cyclo, which failed to detonate. The disguised Ranger claimed that he been paid US$85 for the assassination attempt, and later confessed to being a communist, although given the factionalism in Saigon politics at the time, some believed that the assassination attempt was ordered by others within the political establishment. VC spokespersons did not comment on the incident.

Hương's actual influence was limited, as Thiệu and his military contacts continued to maintain real power. In August 1969, Thiệu replaced him with General Trần Thiện Khiêm. Speculation that Hương would be replaced had been ongoing for a period. The National Assembly had criticised Hương, arguing that his fiscal and anti-corruption policies were ineffective, and Thiệu had not consulted him about policy developments for several months. Hương had also become impaired by asthma and rheumatism by this time.

=== Presidency ===
On 21 April 1975, Thiệu resigned and handed the presidency to Hương. On 28 April 1975, after one week as president, Hương resigned and handed power over to General Dương Văn Minh, who presided over the surrender of the government two days later.

Hương was placed under house arrest by the North Vietnamese. When deemed adequately reformed in 1977, his civil rights were restored but he declined. Instead, he asked for all officials of the Army of the Republic of Vietnam to be released from prison before he would take his place among the freed. His request was ignored. The former president died quietly in his own home in 1982, just 11 months before he was 80. Hương had a wife and two sons: Trần Văn Dõi, a North Vietnamese captain, and Trần Văn Đính.

== Sources ==
- Corfield, Justin (2014). Historical Dictionary of Ho Chi Minh City. Anthem Press. ISBN 9781783083336.
- Hammer, Ellen J. (1987). A Death in November: America in Vietnam, 1963. New York City: E. P. Dutton. ISBN 0-525-24210-4.
- Jones, Howard (2003). Death of a Generation: how the assassinations of Diem and JFK prolonged the Vietnam War. New York City, New York: Oxford University Press. ISBN 0-19-505286-2.
- Kahin, George McT. (1986). Intervention: How America Became Involved in Vietnam. New York City: Knopf. ISBN 0-394-54367-X.
- Karnow, Stanley (1997). Vietnam: A History. New York City: Penguin Books. ISBN 0-670-84218-4.
- Langguth, A. J. (2000). Our Vietnam: the war, 1954–1975. New York City: Simon & Schuster. ISBN 0-684-81202-9.
- McAllister, James (2008). "'Only Religions Count in Vietnam': Thich Tri Quang and the Vietnam War". Modern Asian Studies. 42 (4). New York: Cambridge University Press: 751–782. doi:10.1017/s0026749x07002855. S2CID 145595067.
- Moyar, Mark (2004). "Political Monks: The Militant Buddhist Movement during the Vietnam War". Modern Asian Studies. 38 (4). New York City, New York: Cambridge University Press: 749–784. doi:10.1017/S0026749X04001295. S2CID 145723264.
- Moyar, Mark (2006). Triumph Forsaken: The Vietnam War, 1954–1965. New York City: Cambridge University Press. ISBN 0-521-86911-0.
- Shaplen, Robert (1966). The Lost Revolution: Vietnam 1945–1965. London: Andre Deutsch. OCLC 460367485.
- Tucker, Spencer C. (2000). Encyclopedia of the Vietnam War: A Political, Social and Military History. Santa Barbara, California: ABC-CLIO. ISBN 1-57607-040-9.

Political offices
Preceded by Nguyễn Khánh	Minister of National Defense of South Vietnam; 1964–1965	Succeeded by Trần Văn Minh
Preceded by Nguyễn Khánh	Prime Minister of South Vietnam; 1964–1965	Succeeded by Phan Huy Quát
Preceded by Nguyễn Văn Lộc	Prime Minister of South Vietnam; 1968–1969	Succeeded by Trần Thiện Khiêm
Preceded by Nguyễn Cao Kỳ	Vice President of South Vietnam; 1971–1975	Succeeded by Nguyễn Văn Huyền
Preceded by Nguyễn Văn Thiệu	President of South Vietnam; 1975	Succeeded by Dương Văn Minh
