= Đại Việt Nationalist Party =

Political reform organization

Great Viet Nationalist Party Đại Việt Quốc dân Đảng
- Leader: Trần Trọng Đạt
- Founder: Trương Tử Anh
- Founded: 10 December 1939 (86 years, 249 days)
- Ideology: Vietnamese nationalism Anti-communism; Three Principles of the People
- Political position: Right-wing
- Colors: Red, Blue, White
- Anthem: Việt Nam minh châu trời Đông; Vietnam – Pearl of the Orient

Party flag

Website
- daivietquocdandang.net

The Đại Việt Nationalist Party (Vietnamese: Đại Việt Quốc dân Đảng, pronounced [ʔɗaːj˧˨ʔ viət̚˧˨ʔ kuək̚˧˦ zən˧˧ ʔɗaːŋ˧˩]), often known simply as Đại Việt or ĐVQDĐ, is a nationalist and anti-communist political party and militant organisation that was active in Vietnam in the 20th century. The party expanded during World War II and advocated 'survival nationalism'. The party later had ties with Nguyễn Văn Thiệu in South Vietnam. The party continues to be active outside of Vietnam, with the goal of a multi-party democratic government for the country.

== History ==
The party was founded by Trương Tử Anh, known as "Anh Cả Phương" ("Eldest Brother Phương") in 1939. Among the original members were several prominent figures in Vietnam's politics, such as Dr. Phan Huy Quát and Dr. Nguyễn Tôn Hoàn.

During the era of French colonialism under Japanese military occupation, the Đại Việt engaged in military attacks in an effort to gain independence. Some Đại Việt members were trained in military academies in southern China run by the Kuomintang (KMT), before the Chinese Communist Revolution. The party was Japanese-leaning when it joined the Đại Việt National Alliance in 1944. As that alliance fell apart, it joined the KMT-backed Nationalist Parties Front of Vietnam in May 1945.

After the communist-led Viet Minh sought to consolidate power by eliminating rival nationalist parties, many Đại Việt partisans opted to support the State of Vietnam. After the partition of Vietnam in 1954, the Đại Việt were banned in the communist North Vietnam. They continued to be active in South Vietnam as an opposition to President Ngô Đình Diệm, although internal divisions had emerged.

Elitism crippled the party, preventing it from forming a broad base of support among the public. According to Edwin M. Moise, the Đại Việt were compelled to rely extensively on foreign support, which jeopardized their nationalism's legitimacy. As a result, even high-ranking members of the organizations under their authority found it difficult to inspire real devotion. They couldn't rely on the allegiance of the peasants alone; they couldn't even rely on the fidelity of their own army leaders.

Notable members included:

- Bùi Diễm was Ambassador to the US from 1967 to 1975.
- Phan Huy Quát served in different capacities with several cabinets of the State of Vietnam and of the Republic of Vietnam. His highest position was Prime Minister in 1965.
- Nguyễn Tôn Hoàn briefly served as first Deputy Prime Minister in 1964.
- Trần Trung Dung served in South Vietnam's government and parliament.
- Hà Thúc Ký was Minister of Internal Affairs in 1964; in 1965, after a rift with other Đại Việt's leaders, he formed his own party, the Đại Việt Cách Mạng (Đại Việt Revolutionary Party).
- Nguyễn Ngọc Huy, the party's theorist and founder of the Tân Đại Việt (New Đại Việt Party); taught at Yale University after the fall of Saigon.
- Dương Hiếu Nghĩa, who participated in the 1963 coup d'état, was one of the officers who deposed and assassinated President Ngô Đình Diệm and National Adviser Ngô Đình Nhu on 2 November 1963.

== See also ==
- Vietnamese nationalism
- Vietnam Nationalist Party, a similarly named nationalist party that uses the same flag
