= Đinh Xuân Quảng =

Vietnamese judge and politician (1909–1971)

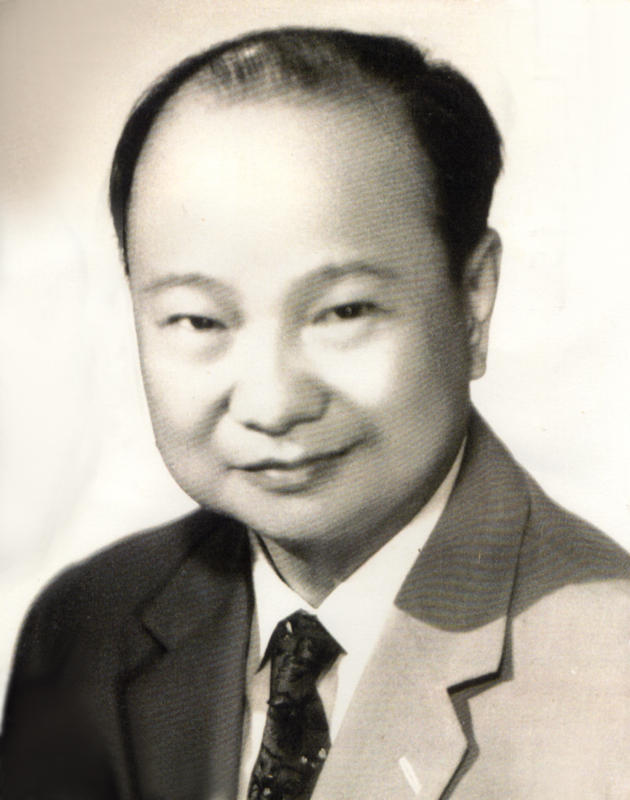

Đinh Xuân Quảng (May 10, 1909 – February 17, 1971) was a Vietnamese judge and a politician who helped institute a new constitution for South Vietnam. Đinh Xuân Quảng was one of the main advocates of the “Nationalist solution” in the efforts to regain independence from France after World War II – an independence which could ultimately be settled through negotiations and peaceful means. He participated throughout this resolution process and negotiated various agreements with France. His efforts led to the abrogation of the Patenotre Treaty in 1884 which had placed Vietnam under a protectorate of France.

He was imprisoned by Ngô Đình Diệm's South Vietnam government for 4 years after the military coup in November 1960. Later he was elected in 1967 as a member of the Constitutional House which drew up the Constitution of the 2nd Republic of Vietnam. He finished his term as the "Speaker of the Constitutional House" which started the Second Republic of Vietnam.

== Early life and education ==
He was born in Thọ Linh, Quảng Bình Province, Central Vietnam to Đinh Xuân Trạc and Nguyễn thị Khôn. Đinh Xuân Trạc was a mandarin.

After an initial education in the traditional Vietnamese system, Đinh Xuân Quảng attended the French Lycée Albert Sarraut in Hanoi. In 1926, he was “expelled” from the Lycée Albert Sarraut for joining in a protest organized during Phan Chu Trinh's funeral demanding the end of French occupation which degenerated into a riot. Later in Saigon he attended the Lycée Chasseloup Laubat in Saigon graduating with a “baccalaureate in Philosophy” with top honors. He obtained an honor in “Concours général des lycées de France et d’Outre mer.” Afterwards he joined the newly established University of Hanoi School of Law class 1930 where he graduated with a bachelor's degree in law in 1933 with honors. Đinh Xuân Quảng held a BSc in law from the charter class at the University Hanoi School of Law (1930). He was one of the first Vietnamese judges trained at the Law School in Hanoi. He was a prominent Catholic intellectual and a proponent of the “Nationalist Movement” and a determined opponent to colonialism and communism in Vietnam.

In 1938 he married Trần thị Kim Dung, who came from a prominent Catholic family in Nam Định. They had four children. Đinh Thị Tố Quyên (1941– ) married to Mai Viết Hiếu; Đinh Xuân Quân (1943– ), Đinh Xuân Quốc (1946–1965) and Đinh Thị Tố Quỳnh (1950– ), married to Kiều Quang Chẩn. Dr. Đinh Xuân Quân is an acclaimed development economist who has served as Adviser to many Prime Ministers and Ministers worldwide. Dr. Quỳnh Kiều is an acclaimed Pediatrician in the United States. She is well respected for Project Vietnam, a medical NGO that has come back to Vietnam twice yearly to provide medical care for the under-served in rural areas of Vietnam.

== Anti-colonial activism ==
Đinh Xuân Quảng vowed to promote for an independent Vietnam via peaceful and legalistic means with a peaceful reunification with Cochinchina.

In 1934 he took a competitive examination ("concours") to join the French Judicial system in 1934. He was appointed as a "greffier", and later became one of the first Vietnamese judges in the French judicial system. He was posted in many tribunals in Vietnam notably in Annam (central Vietnam) as a judge in Vinh, and in Tonkin (northern Vietnam) as an Attorney General in Hanoi.

During the Second World War, he was active in the movement for Vietnam's independence and was a spokesperson for the Catholic Intellectuals Movement. Đinh Xuân Quảng supported the non communist solution in the early 1940s. He advocated reform and restructuring in public management, and worked to free the Vietnamese from the "obedience" mentality by advocating independence through the modernization of its philosophy and education.

== Post World War II political activity ==
From 1945 to 1946, Đinh Xuân Quảng was appointed “Biện Lý – Attorney General” of the Hanoi Tribunal in charge of the whole Northern region of Vietnam (Tonkin). In his position he raised the question with Ho Chi Minh on "illegal arrests" made by the Viet Minh. He became a target for assassination and was forced to flee to China while his family took refuge in the Catholic enclave of Phát Diệm. In China he joined many nationalists including Trần Văn Tuyên, Nguyễn Tường Tam, Phan Huy Đán, Nghiêm Xuân Thiện, and others. He met former Emperor Bảo Đại and became one of his two advisers (Đinh Xuân Quảng and Phan Huy Đán).

The nationalist side formed a non-communist solution. A Nationalist Union Front (MTQGLH – Mat Tran Quoc Gia Lien Hiep) was launched in 1947 to support the return of former Emperor Bảo Đại to lead the negotiations with France. In Hong Kong, China and Vietnam, Đinh xuân Quảng and his friends pushed for a State of Vietnam solution as an alternative to the communist government of Ho Chi Minh. Negotiations between France and the "Bảo Đại team" resulted in the signing on June 5, 1948, of the Halong Bay Declaration in which France promised independence to Vietnam. Đinh Xuân Quảng participated and signed as a representative for Vietnam.

Đinh Xuân Quảng was a member of the negotiating team for the Élysée Treaty that was signed between Bao Đai and French President Vincent Auriol on March 8, 1949, recognizing Vietnam as an independent state with capability for its own administration, finance, and foreign affairs. The former French colony of Cochinchina was reintegrated into Vietnam on June 14, 1949.

In 1947 Đinh Xuân Quảng returned to Vietnam with Trần Trọng Kim and others. He returned to continue to gain the return of Cochinchina into Vietnam as well as continue the struggle for independence.

In the process to build the State of Vietnam, he contributed to and participated in many cabinets from 1948 to 1954 in various functions. His main contribution was the setting up of administrative and civil service structures for the newly established State of Vietnam to replace the colonial administration. The contribution included the setting up of the new flag and its anthem and the organizational structures of the State if Vietnam to transition from the French colonial administration to the independent state of Vietnam's administration in civil service, health, etc. contributing to the foundation to the new independent Vietnam.

In 1947 he went to France and Switzerland with HM Bảo Đại representing the Vietnamese side to negotiate with Mr. Bollaert and his team whom represented France.

On January 6, 1948, he participated in the Provisional Central Government under Prime Minister Nguyễn Văn Xuân as the Secretary to the Prime Minister's Office (PM). This was a pivotal period in the negotiations between France and VN in which he was one of the representatives of VN during the signing of the Hạ Long Bay Declaration. As Secretary to the PM's Office, he coordinated the government's activities during this transitional period and at the same time being involved in the negotiations for the reintegration of Cochinchina into Vietnam.

He resigned from his cabinet position on January 4, 1949, to protest against the French slowness to revert the colonial administration back to the Vietnamese central government. He went on to participate as a member of the Vietnamese delegation negotiating with France for the Elysée Treaty signed on March 8, 1949. Elysée Treaty nullified the Patenôtre Treaty of 1884 and agreed to return Cochinchina back to the State of Vietnam (signed on June 14, 1949) by peaceful means.

During the short Bảo Đại cabinet (July 1, 1949 – January 20, 1950) he continued negotiations between France and Vietnam. During this period, Vietnam issued the Public Law July 1, 1949 on “the Organization of the State” and on “Organization of the Administration”. During this period, many countries have recognized the new State of Vietnam.

From Jan 21st 1950 – May 6, 1950 he participated in the cabinet of Nguyễn Phan Long as Minister of the PM's Office but the cabinet could not survive due to external pressures from France.

During the 1st Trần Văn Hữu cabinet (May 6, 1950 – Feb 21, 1951) Đinh Xuân Quảng became the first Minister of Public Service of the State of Vietnam. In this position he continued the effort to build the Vietnamese public administration started in 1948 through the “take over” of colonial administration, to consolidate the Cochinchina administration into the State of Vietnam administration and transitioning of the State of Vietnam. His participation in various cabinets allowed him to enact the reinforcement of the State of Vietnam administration through various Acts and Decrees: Civil Service Act – Quy chế công chức (July 14, 1950), Union regulation – Quy chế Nghiệp Đoàn (January 16, 1952), Municipality Organization Regulations – Hội Đồng Đô Thành (December 27, 52), etc. The Judicial – Judges’ regulation was established through decree 10/TP. He also contributed to the Health sector reintegrating the old colonial health system into the new one and building many new hospitals and facilities including the “children's hospital” in Saigon.

In the second Trần Văn Hữu cabinet (February 21, 1951 – March 7, 1952) he held the position of Minister to the Budget but was asked to return to hold Public Service positions to continue his work of Public Administration Reform. Đinh Xuân Quảng was able to continue this work up until the third Trần Văn Hữu cabinet (March 7, 1952 – June 26, 1952) where he held the position of Minister to the PM's office.

In Vietnam and in Hànội he represented the State of Vietnam to receive the “sword and seal of Emperor Bảo Đại” that was given to the Vietnam's representatives in 1945 when Bảo Đại resigned and had been hidden by the VM to date.

Under the Nguyễn Văn Tâm's cabinet he returned to the Judicial sector as a judge at the Cour d’Appel of Saigon.

He held the position of Minister of Interior in the Bửu Lộc cabinet (Jan 11, 1954 – July 7, 1954). This was a very difficult period where the Geneva Conference was held to discuss the division of Vietnam into two countries. The Bưu Lộc cabinet was able to sign the Independence Treaty and the Association Treaty between France and Vietnam on June 4, 1954.

This cabinet resigned in protest to the Geneva Conference partition of the country and handed the power to the newly nominated PM Ngô Đình Diệm.

During July 1949 to July 1954, the State of Vietnam had 5 Prime Ministers and 8 cabinets. Đinh Xuân Quảng participated in 5 cabinets due to his professional competence and reputation.

After the Geneva Accords of 1954 he returned to the judicial sector being a member of the Cour de Cassation (Supreme Court) and the Cour d’Appel de Saigon.

After the Geneva Treaty dividing Vietnam into two countries, Đinh Xuân Quảng returned to the Judicial sector as a Judge at the Tribunal de Grande Instance de Saigon and as a member of the Cour de Cassation – Sài Gòn.

During 1955–1956, Đinh Xuân Quảng declined overture from the Ngô Đình Diệm administration whom he had experience dealing with in Hong Kong, and did not cooperate with the government due to its dictatorial behavior. He escaped an assassination attempt and went into hiding for many months. He participated in the nationalist opposition movement struggling for a democratic and non-communist Vietnam. During this period he contributed to many opposition newspapers in the South including the “Chính Luận” newspaper.

On November 11, 1960, after the failed military coup he gave refuge to his friend Phan Huy Đán which resulted in the imprisonment of his family for almost 4 years (his son Đinh Xuân Quân was released after 6 months of detention). Đinh Xuân Quảng and his wife – the only woman imprisoned during this period went to the Special Military Tribunal on July 11, 1963, and were rehabilitated after the fall of the Ngô Đình Diệm in 1963.

During the period 1962–1965 the north–south warfare intensified with more involvement from the US. It became a proxy war in the “Cold war.”

== Participation in the writing of national constitution ==
In 1964 to 1966, Đinh Xuân Quảng did not participate in any public service positions. He participated in the September 9, 1966's election for the Constitutional House opening the way to the 2nd Republic of Viet Nam.

As a jurist and one of the three jurists in the Constitutional Assembly, he participated in the writing up of the 2nd Republic Constitution. After the resignation of Mr. Phan Khắc Sửu, he became the Speaker of the Constitutional House which created the 2nd Republic of Việt Nam. The Constitution was published on April 3, 1967, and the presidential election was organized.

He died at 62 in 1971 after a long illness.
