= Phan Huy Quát =

South Vietnamese politician (1908–1979)

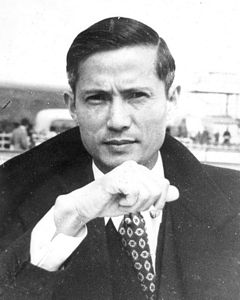
- Quát in Paris

4th Prime Minister of South Vietnam
- In office 16 February 1965 – 12 June 1965
- Deputy: Trần Văn Đỗ; Trần Văn Tuyên
- Chief of State: Phan Khắc Sửu
- Preceded by: Trần Văn Hương
- Succeeded by: Nguyễn Cao Kỳ (as Chairman of Central Executive Committee)

Minister of Foreign Affairs of South Vietnam
- In office 8 February 1964 – 4 November 1964
- Prime Minister: Nguyễn Khánh; Nguyễn Xuân Oánh (Acting); Nguyễn Khánh; Phan Khắc Sửu (Acting)
- Preceded by: Phạm Đăng Lâm
- Succeeded by: Phạm Đăng Lâm

Minister of Democratization of the State of Vietnam
- In office 11 January 1954 – 16 June 1954
- Prime Minister: Prince Bửu Lộc
- Preceded by: position established
- Succeeded by: position abolished

Minister of Defense of the State of Vietnam
- In office 8 January 1953 – 17 December 1953
- Prime Minister: Nguyễn Văn Tâm
- Preceded by: Nghiêm Văn Tri
- Succeeded by: Nguyễn Đắc Khê
- In office 20 January 1950 – 7 May 1950
- Prime Minister: Nguyễn Phan Long
- Preceded by: Nguyễn Văn Xuân
- Succeeded by: Trần Văn Hữu

Deputy Prime Minister of the State of Vietnam
- In office 20 January 1950 – 18 February 1951
- Prime Minister: Nguyễn Phan Long; Trần Văn Hữu
- Preceded by: Nguyễn Văn Xuân
- Succeeded by: Nguyễn Khắc Vệ

Minister of Education of the State of Vietnam
- In office 1 July 1949 – 20 January 1950
- Prime Minister: Bảo Đại
- Preceded by: position established

Personal details
- Born: 12 June 1908 Hà Tĩnh, Annam, French Indochina
- Died: 27 April 1979 (aged 70) Chí Hòa Prison, Ho Chi Minh City, Vietnam
- Party: Đại Việt Nationalist Party
- Spouse: Đặng Thị Lý
- Children: 6
- Relatives: Phan Huy Lê (half brother)
- Education: Université indochinoise

Phan Huy Quát (Vietnamese: [faːn˧˧ hwi˧˧ kwaːt̚˧˦]; 12 June 1908 – 27 April 1979) was a Vietnamese doctor and politician who served as prime minister of the Republic of Vietnam for four months in 1965.

== Early life ==
Phan Huy Quát was born in Lộc Hà district in Hà Tĩnh province. He attended the École Pellerin in Huế then studied medicine in Hanoi and qualified as a doctor before entering politics.

On 1 July 1949, Quát was appointed Minister of Education of the State of Vietnam by Chief of State Bảo Đại. On 22 January 1950, Prime Minister Nguyễn Phan Long appointed Quát Minister of Defense, at which position he had only served briefly before the Cabinet was re-organized and he returned to working for the Đại Việt Quốc dân đảng.

In June 1953, Prime Minister Nguyễn Văn Tâm appointed Quát Minister of Defense. Quát would be in this position until 1954 when Prince Bửu Lộc became Prime Minister who appointed Quát Special Minister in charge of the democratization process for Vietnam. Dr. Quát then served briefly as an interim prime minister until Bảo Đại appointed Ngô Đình Diệm to the position.

In April 1960, Quát signed the Caravelle Manifesto, a list of grievances and demands specifically critical of Diệm, and was promptly jailed by the government. After Diệm's assassination in October 1963, Quát was appointed Foreign Minister by Major General Nguyễn Khánh, one of the principal participants in the bloody coup. Though Quát frequently criticized Khánh's self-serving rule, he remained in Khánh's cabinet until November 1964, when Trần Văn Hương was installed as Prime Minister of General Khánh's freshly created High National Council (HNC).

On 16 February 1965, the Armed Forces Council, a group of South Vietnamese military officers who took over when General Khánh deposed Hương and the HNC, secured Quát's appointment to prime minister in order to foil a power grab by the junta chief Khánh, who intended to install the economist Nguyễn Xuân Oánh as his puppet in the Prime Minister post. Khánh himself was forced to step down after a coup on 19/20 February and was subsequently exiled. Air Marshal Nguyễn Cao Kỳ then led the junta that oversaw the civilian cabinet.

In 1965, Kỳ was appointed prime minister and Nguyễn Văn Thiệu became president by a special joint meeting of military leaders following the voluntary resignation of civilian President Sửu. After leaving the Prime Minister post, Dr. Quát returned to his medical practice. He remained in politics until 1975 by working with the Asia Anti-Communist League (Liên Minh Á Châu Chống Cộng) as chairman of its Vietnamese office.

=== Later life ===
After the Fall of Saigon, Quát went into hiding. In August 1975, he was arrested and jailed at Chí Hòa Prison after a failed attempt to escape from Vietnam. It was there that he died of liver failure on 27 April 1979. The official report indicated that Quát had died from "a stroke, heart attack and liver failure".

== See also ==
- 1965 South Vietnamese coup

Political offices
Preceded by Nguyễn Xuân Oánh	Prime Minister of the Republic of Vietnam; 1965	Succeeded by Nguyễn Cao Kỳ
