= Trần Văn Đỗ =

Minister of Foreign Affairs of South Vietnam from 1965 to 1968

Doctor Trần Văn Đỗ
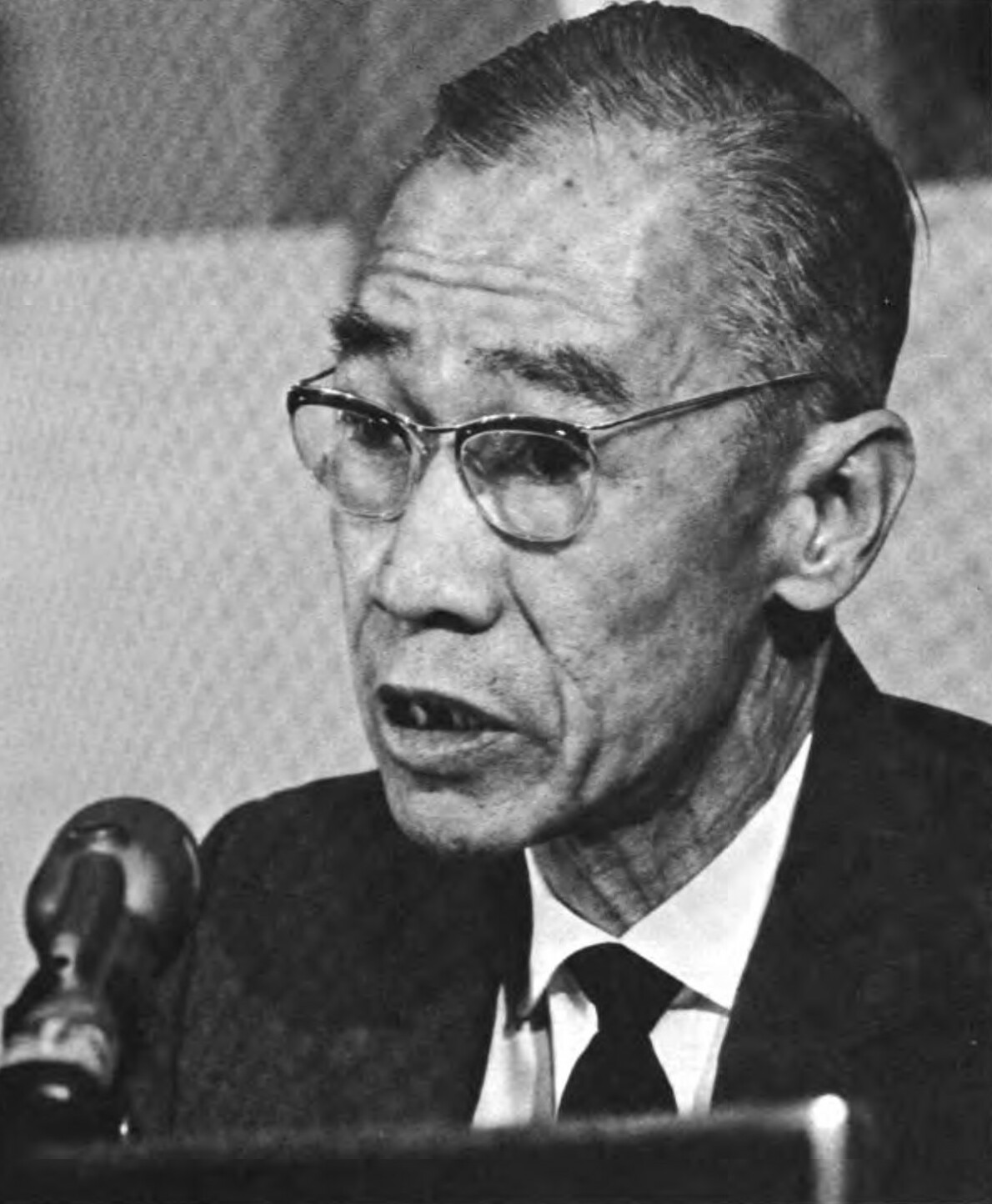
- Dr. Đỗ being interviewed by the BBC in London in 1967

Minister of Foreign Affairs of South Vietnam
- In office 16 February 1965 – 20 May 1968
- Prime Minister: Phan Huy Quát (1965); Nguyễn Cao Kỳ (1965–1967); Nguyễn Văn Lộc (1967–1968)
- Preceded by: Phạm Đăng Lâm
- Succeeded by: Trần Chánh Thành

Deputy Prime Minister of South Vietnam
- In office 16 February 1965 – 12 June 1965 Serving with: Nguyễn Văn Thiệu; Trần Văn Tuyên
- Prime Minister: Phan Huy Quát
- Preceded by: Nguyễn Lưu Viên; Nguyễn Xuân Oánh
- Succeeded by: Nguyễn Hữu Có; Nguyễn Lưu Viên

Minister of Foreign Affairs of the State of Vietnam
- In office 6 July 1954 – 20 October 1955
- Prime Minister: Ngô Đình Diệm
- Preceded by: Nguyễn Quốc Định
- Succeeded by: Position abolished

Personal details
- Born: 15 November 1903 Phủ Lý, Tonkin, French Indochina
- Died: 20 December 1990 (aged 87) Paris, France
- Party: Nationalist Party of Greater Vietnam
- Other political affiliations: National Social Democratic Front (Big tent affiliation); Bloc for Liberty and Progress (1960–1963)
- Spouse: M.Lưu
- Children: Trần Văn Đức (son)
- Parents: Trần Văn Thông (father); Bùi Thị Lan (mother)
- Relatives: Trần Văn Chương (brother); Trần Lệ Xuân (niece); Ngô Đình Nhu (nephew-in-law); Trần Văn Khiêm (nephew)
- Education: University of Paris (M.D.)

Trần Văn Đỗ (Vietnamese pronunciation: [t͡ɕən˨˩ van˧˧ ʔɗo˦ˀ˥]; 15 November 1903 – 20 December 1990) was a South Vietnamese intellectual and politician who served in both the governments of the State of Vietnam and South Vietnam as Minister of Foreign Affairs and Deputy Prime Minister of South Vietnam. He was the younger brother of Trần Văn Chương, who served as the South Vietnamese ambassador to the United States in the early 1960s under the government of South Vietnam's first President Ngô Đình Diệm. He was also the uncle of then South Vietnam's First Lady Trần Lệ Xuân, commonly known as Madame Nhu. He was an outspoken critic of the Diệm's government, and in 1960, he was one of the main drafters of the Caravelle Manifesto, a public document, supported by many political factions of the South Vietnamese government, demanding reform within Diệm's government.

== Biography ==
=== Early life ===
He was born on 15 November 1903 in Phủ Lý, Tonkin, French Indochina. He studied in France, obtained a medical doctor degree from the University of Paris.

=== Political career ===
He decided not to sign the Geneva Agreement because he did not accept the division of Vietnam and on behalf of the Vietnamese National Delegation issued a separate statement:

"...the Vietnamese government requests the Conference to officially acknowledge that Vietnam solemnly opposes the signing of the Agreement and its provisions that do not respect the deep aspirations of the Vietnamese people. Request the Conference to acknowledge that the Government grants itself the right to complete freedom of action to protect the sacred rights of the Vietnamese people in the process of realizing Unification, Independence, and Freedom for the country."

He was then appointed Minister of Foreign Affairs, but after only one year, withdrew in 1955. During the First Republic, he opposed President Ngô Đình Diệm's policies. He was one of 18 members of the Caravelle group to sign the petition, also known as the Caravelle Declaration to Ngô Đình Diệm, demanding government reform in April 1960.

In 1965, he served as Deputy Prime Minister in the cabinet of Prime Minister Phan Huy Quát and Minister of Foreign Affairs. After the premiership of Phan Huy Quát ended, he stepped down as Deputy Prime Minister, but continue on to serve as Minister of Foreign Affairs (1965–1968) under the premiership of Prime Ministers Nguyễn Cao Kỳ and Nguyễn Văn Lộc.

=== Life in exile ===
After the Fall of Saigon, he took asylum in France as a political refugee where lived quietly for the remainder of his life. He died on 20 December 1990, in Paris.

== Honour ==
=== Foreign honour ===
- Thailand :
  - Knight Grand Cross of the Order of the Crown of Thailand (1965)

Political offices
Preceded by Nguyễn Quốc Định	Minister of Foreign Affairs of the State of Vietnam; 1954–1955	Succeeded by Position abolished
Preceded by Nguyễn Xuân Oánh; Nguyễn Lưu Viên	Deputy Prime Minister of the Republic of Vietnam; 1965	Succeeded by Nguyễn Hữu Có; Nguyễn Lưu Viên
Preceded by Phạm Đăng Lâm	Minister of Foreign Affairs of the Republic of Vietnam; 1965–1968	Succeeded by Trần Chánh Thành
