= Vice President Nguyễn =

Vice President Nguyễn may refer to:

- Nguyễn Cao Kỳ (1930–2011), 2nd Vice President of South Vietnam
- Nguyễn Ngọc Thơ (1908–1976), 1st Vice President of South Vietnam
- Nguyễn Văn Huyền (1913–1995), 4th Vice President of South Vietnam

== See also ==
- Nguyen
