= Vũ Văn Mẫu =

Last Prime Minister of South Vietnam in 1975

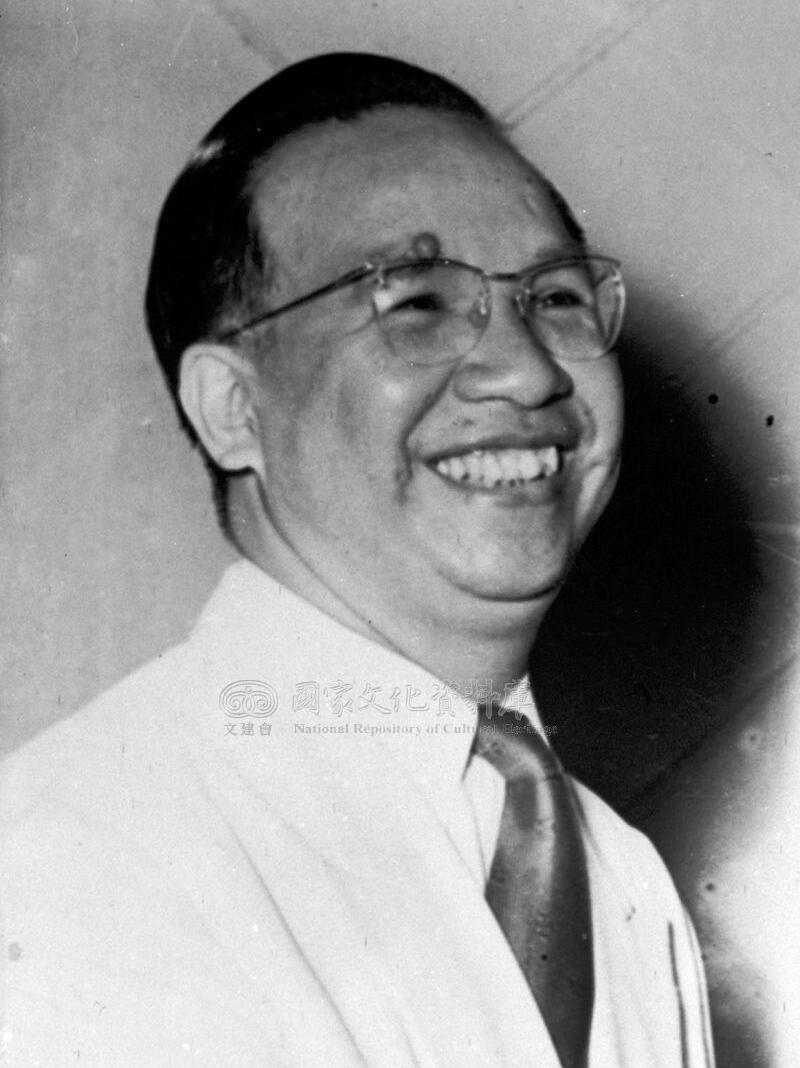
- Mẫu in 1960

10th Prime Minister of South Vietnam
- In office 28 April 1975 – 30 April 1975
- President: Dương Văn Minh
- Deputy: Hồ Văn Minh
- Preceded by: Nguyễn Bá Cẩn
- Succeeded by: Position abolished; Huỳnh Tấn Phát (as Chairman of the Provisional Revolutionary Government of the Republic of South Vietnam)

Minister of Foreign Affairs of South Vietnam
- In office 29 October 1955 – 22 August 1963
- President: Ngô Đình Diệm
- Preceded by: Position established
- Succeeded by: Trương Công Cừu

Personal details
- Born: 25 July 1914 Hanoi, Tonkin, French Indochina
- Died: 20 August 1998 (aged 84) Paris, France
- Party: Forces for National Reconciliation
- Spouse: Hoàng Thị Nguyệt My
- Children: 5
- Education: University of Paris (BA; MA); Faculté de droit de Paris (PhD)

Vũ Văn Mẫu (Vietnamese: [vu˦ˀ˥ van˧˧ məw˦ˀ˥]; 25 July 1914 – 20 August 1998) was a South Vietnamese diplomat and politician, who was the last Prime Minister of South Vietnam, serving under President Dương Văn Minh's leadership in 1975. He held the position for only two days before the collapse and surrender of South Vietnam on 30 April 1975.

== Early life and career ==
He was born on 25 July 1914 in Hanoi, Tonkin, French Indochina. He earned a doctorate in law from the Faculté de droit de Paris and practiced law in Hanoi. After Vietnam's partition in 1954, he moved to Saigon with his family and joined the Faculty of Law at the University of Saigon, where he became the Dean of the Faculty. He was recognized as an expert in civil and historical law. After several years as a professor he then became a local Saigon judge, rising through the ranks to become Judge of the Saigon Superior Court. During his legal career and even during retirement and exile, he authored a number of books, including one entitled Vietnamese Civil Law.

== Political career ==
After carrying out the referendum of South Vietnam in 1955, deposing the Chief of State Bảo Đại and the State of Vietnam. Then Prime Minister Ngô Đình Diệm established a new government, Republic of Vietnam which Diệm proclaimed himself as president and invited Mẫu to hold the position of Foreign Minister of the Republic of Vietnam.

He held this position for eight years, from 1955 to 1963. During the Buddhist crisis of 1963, he resigned on August 22, 1963, shaving his head like a monk in protest. He strongly opposed the fierce repressive measures of the Ngô Đình Diệm's government against Buddhism. When he attempted to leave the Republic of Vietnam to join a pilgrimage to India, he was arrested and placed under house arrest.

Mẫu was South Vietnam's ambassador to the United Kingdom, Belgium, and the Netherlands in the mid- to late 1960s. In the early 1970s, he was elected Senator of the Republic where he became a prominent national politician.

=== Prime Minister of South Vietnam (1975) ===
On 28 April 1975, he became Prime Minister of the Republic of Vietnam under President Dương Văn Minh. During his tenure, he was always active in the movement for peace and reconciliation for the nation. Therefore, when General Dương Văn Minh became president, he was nominated for the post of Prime Minister of the Republic of Vietnam for the purpose of participating in negotiations to end the war. However, he was only in office for only two days when the Republic of Vietnam collapsed before the advancing army of the National Front for the Liberation of South Vietnam. He had to join President Dương Văn Minh and Vice President Nguyễn Văn Huyền in declaring their unconditional surrender to avoid further bloodshed.

== Post–Fall of Saigon and exile ==
Like General Dương Văn Minh, he was a moderate, supporting the policy of handing over the government to the Liberation Army. Therefore, the Revolutionary government only implemented monitoring measures, not being strict with him. After the situation stabilized, Mẫu was allowed to leave the country to immigrate to France in 1988 and settled there for the rest of his life. He died on August 20, 1998, in Paris, aged 84.

== Personal life ==
Mẫu was married and had five children, whom all resided in France. His daughter, Vũ Thị Việt Hương, followed her father's profession in law, by obtaining a Doctorate of Law at Saigon Law University. After graduating she returned to her old school to teach, specializing in International Law and Comparative Law. Mẫu was a great scholar of Vietnamese law, a veteran scholar, he knows many languages and was fluent in English, French, Latin, and Chinese and was very highly regarded as a professor of law. His work is also cited by René David and John E.C. Brierley in the famous book on comparative law Major Legal Systems in the World Today.

Political offices
Preceded by Position established	Minister Foreign Affairs of the Republic of Vietnam; 1955–1963	Succeeded by Phạm Đăng Lâm
Preceded by Nguyễn Bá Cẩn	Prime Minister of the Republic of Vietnam; 1975	Succeeded by: Position abolished; Huỳnh Tấn Phát (as Chairman of the Provisional Revolutionary Government of the Republic of South Vietnam)
