= Minister of Foreign Affairs (South Vietnam) =

Foreign minister of South Vietnam

Minister of Foreign Affairs of South Vietnam
- Vietnamese: Bộ trưởng Ngoại giao Việt Nam Cộng Hòa; French: Ministre des affaires étrangères du Sud-Vietnam
- Emblem (1963–75)

- Flag
- Incumbent; None
- Ministry of Foreign Affairs
- Status: Minister
- Member of: Government
- Reports to: The Prime Minister
- Seat: Saigon (now Ho Chi Minh City)
- Appointer: The Emperor (1949–55); The President (1955–75)
- Term length: No fixed term
- Formation: 1949; 77 years ago
- First holder: Nguyễn Phan Long
- Final holder: Vương Văn Bắc
- Abolished: 1975; 51 years ago
- Deputy: Vice Minister of Foreign Affairs

The Minister of Foreign Affairs was a government minister in charge of the Ministry of Foreign Affairs of South Vietnam (common name for the State of Vietnam and the Republic of Vietnam), in what is now southern region of Vietnam. The Minister was responsible for conducting foreign relations of the country.

== List of ministers ==
The following is a list of foreign ministers of South Vietnam from 1949 until the fall of Saigon in 1975:

No.	Name (Birth–Death)	Portrait	Tenure
State of Vietnam (1949–1955)
1	Nguyễn Phan Long (1888–1960)		1949–1950
2	Trần Văn Hữu (1896–1984)		1950–1952
3	Nguyễn Trung Vinh		1952
4	Trương Vĩnh Tống (1884–1974)		1952–1954
5	Nguyễn Quốc Định (1916–1976)		1954
6	Trần Văn Đỗ (1903–1990)		1954–1955
Republic of Vietnam (1955–1975)
7	Vũ Văn Mẫu (1914–1998)		1955–1963
—	Trương Công Cừu (1917–2022) Acting Minister		1963
8	Phạm Đăng Lâm (1918–1975)		1963–1964
9	Phan Huy Quát (1908–1979)		1964
(8)	Phạm Đăng Lâm (1918–1975)		1964–1965
(6)	Trần Văn Đỗ (1903–1990)		1965–1968
10	Trần Chánh Thành (1917–1975)		1968–1969
11	Trần Văn Lắm (1913–2001)		1969–1973
—	Nguyễn Phú Đức (1924–2017) Acting Minister		1973
12	Vương Văn Bắc (1927–2011)		1973–1975

== See also ==
- Minister of Foreign Affairs (Vietnam)
