= Trần Chánh Thành =

South Vietnamese lawyer and politician (1917–1975)

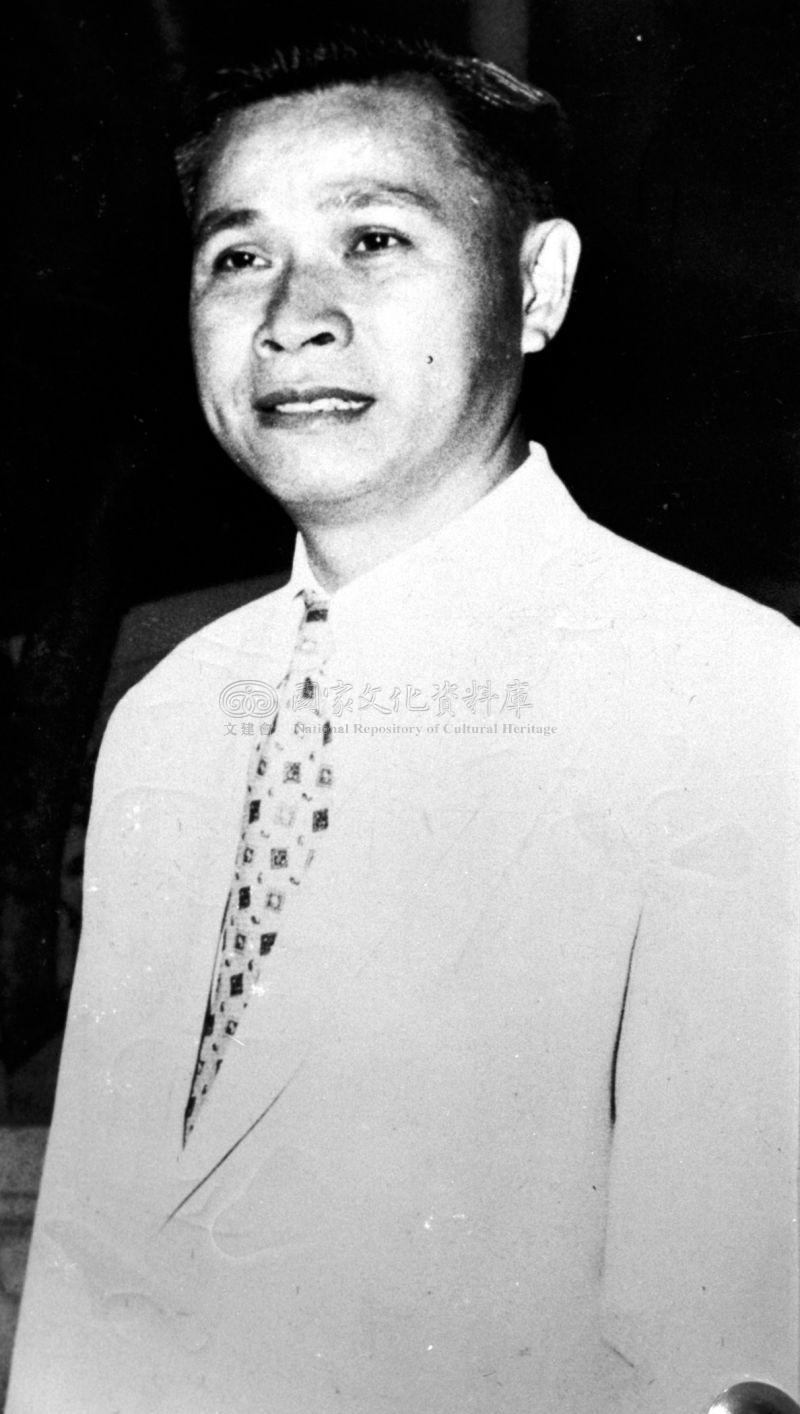
- Thành visiting Taiwan in 1960

Minister of Foreign Affairs of South Vietnam
- In office 27 May 1968 – 4 July 1969
- Prime Minister: Trần Văn Hương
- Preceded by: Trần Văn Đỗ
- Succeeded by: Đồng Quang Minh

Minister of Information of South Vietnam
- In office 29 October 1955 – 1962
- President: Ngô Đình Diệm
- Preceded by: Position established
- Succeeded by: Tôn Thất Thiện

Minister of Information of the State of Vietnam
- In office 10 May 1955 – 23 October 1955
- Prime Minister: Ngô Đình Diệm
- Preceded by: Position established
- Succeeded by: Position abolished

Deputy Prime Minister of the State of Vietnam
- In office 24 September 1954 – 23 October 1955
- Prime Minister: Ngô Đình Diệm
- Preceded by: Nguyễn Văn Xuân
- Succeeded by: Position abolished

Personal details
- Born: 9 July 1917 Hanoi, Tonkin, French Indochina
- Died: 3 May 1975 (aged 57) Saigon – Gia Dinh, North Vietnamese-occupied South Vietnam
- Cause of death: Suicide via Drug overdose
- Party: Independent (since 1963)
- Other political affiliations: Cần Lao (until 1963)
- Children: 6
- Education: University of Indochina (LL.B.)

Trần Chánh Thành (9 July 1917 – 3 May 1975) was a South Vietnamese diplomat and politician who served as Deputy Prime Minister of the State of Vietnam under Prime Minister Ngô Đình Diệm from 1954 to 1955. He played a crucial role as Minister of Information, which helped lead the ouster of Bảo Đại in the 1955 referendum. After the establishment of the Republic of Vietnam, he would go on to serve in South Vietnam's first President Ngô Đình Diệm's government as the Minister of Information and the Minister of Foreign Affairs of South Vietnam under the premiership of Prime Minister Trần Văn Hương.

== Biography ==
=== Early life ===
Thành was born in Hanoi, Tonkin, French Indochina and raised in central Vietnam in the capital of Huế where his father Trần Đức served as a foreign language interpreter for the Emperor Khải Định. As a child, Thành excelled in his studies, after graduating from high school in Huế, he went to study at the University of Hanoi, earning a LL.B. in law.

=== Career ===
After graduating from university, he joined the Viet Minh in fighting for Vietnamese independence. However, he grew disenfranchised with the Viet Minh after witnessing them being more dedicated to Communism than Nationalism and committing heinous and cunning acts, he left. After leaving the Viet Minh, he joined the law firm of Lawyer Trương Đình Dzu.

During the premiership of Prime Minister Ngô Đình Diệm, he was invited to assume the role of Deputy Prime Minister of the State of Vietnam, in addition to serving as a minister overseeing the Independence Palace from 1954 to 1955. In 1955, Ngô Đình Diệm created the Ministry of Information, which he appointed Thành as minister. Thanh was tasked by Diệm and his brother Ngô Đình Nhu to utilize the media to create propaganda leaflets to help build support to help oust the Head of State Bảo Đại in the 1955 referendum and opposition to the Communist. After ousting the Head of State Bảo Đại, Diệm established the Republic of Vietnam commonly known as South Vietnam on 26 October 1955 with Diệm proclaiming himself as president. President Diệm personally invited Thành to continue serving as the Minister of Information, a position Thành served until 1962. In early November 1963, a coup led by General Dương Văn Minh, resulted in the overthrow and assassination of Ngô Đình Diệm made Thành briefly withdraw from politics. He made his political comeback in 1967, after being elected as a member of the senate in the National Assembly. The following year he was invited by Prime Minister Trần Văn Hương to serve as Minister of Foreign Affairs of South Vietnam from 1968 to 1969. When the premiership of Trần Văn Hương ended, Thành retired from politics.

After a stint in politics, he went on to teach journalism at the École des Dessins until the Fall of Saigon.

=== Fall of Saigon and death ===
On 30 April 1975, Thành and his family were promised to be evacuated by the French; however, the evacuation did not happen as it was too late as the forces of the People's Army of Vietnam and Viet Cong were closing in on Saigon. As a result, three days later, he committed suicide in his home by overdosing on medicine pills in protest of the Communist North Vietnamese victory and take over of South Vietnam.

== Work ==
- Le Statut Politique des Hauts Plateaux, 1942
- Les Juridictions mandarinales, 1943
- Kỹ Thuật Thông Tin, 1957
- Les Problemes de l'Information dans les pays sous-developpes, 1962
- Mở Mang Quốc Gia Chậm Tiến
- Xây Dựng Dân Chủ Trong Hoàn Cảnh Chiến Tranh Và Chậm Tiến
- Các Mục Tiêu Đối Ngoại Căn Bản Của Việt Nam Cộng Hòa
