= Nguyễn Quốc Định =

Vietnamese intellectual, jurist, and politician (1916–1976)

Doctor Nguyễn Quốc Định
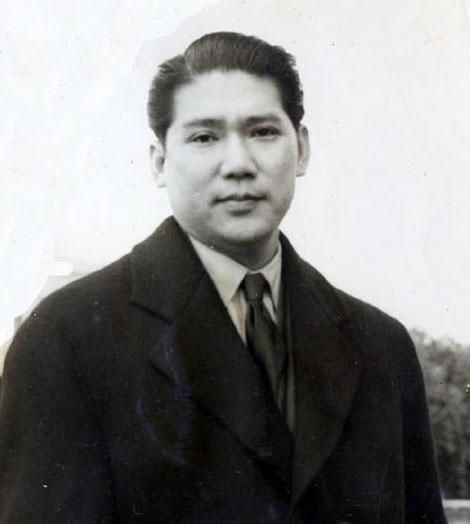
- Định in 1948

Minister of Foreign Affairs of the State of Vietnam
- In office 16 January 1954 – 1 July 1954
- Prime Minister: Prince Bửu Lộc; Ngô Đình Diệm
- Preceded by: Trương Vĩnh Tống
- Succeeded by: Trần Văn Đỗ

Personal details
- Born: 1916 Nam Định, Tonkin, French Indochina
- Died: 1976 (aged 59–60) Paris, France
- Education: University of Toulouse (PhD)
- Profession: Jurist; Professor; Politician

Nguyễn Quốc Định (1916 – 1976) was a Vietnamese professor and politician. He was the Minister of Foreign Affairs of Vietnam under the premierships of Prince Bửu Lộc and Ngô Đình Diệm.

== Education and career ==
He was born in 1916 in Nam Định, Nam Định province, French Indochina. He defended his doctoral thesis at the University of Toulouse on the subject of Chinese congregations in French Indochina (published in 1941 by Sirey with a preface by Paul Couzinet). Engaged as a volunteer in 1940, he was demobilized and taught at the Faculty of Law of the University of Toulouse from 1942 to 1954. He was the first Vietnamese to be certified in law faculties, in the 1948 competition – he would retain Vietnamese nationality until the end of South Vietnam in 1975. He worked as a professor at the University of Toulouse from 1948 to 1954, then at the Faculty of Law of Caen from 1954 to 1966, finally at that of Paris from 1966 to 1976, where since 1952 he had been in charge of a course on the rights of the peoples of Indochina. Nguyen Quoc Dinh's teachings focused mainly on public international law, but also on social science methods and political sociology.

In parallel to his teaching career, Định was politically active in the early fifties, where he was Minister of Foreign Affairs of Vietnam (1954) in the last phase of the regime of Emperor Bao Dai. Following this function, he took part in the negotiation – as an adviser in respect of Vietnam – in the 1954 Geneva Conference which put an end to the “first” war in Indochina. From 1966 to 1975, he represented the Republic of Vietnam at UNESCO.

== Works ==
=== A sociological objectivist ===
From a scientific point of view, Định has always claimed to be a disciple of Duguit and Scelle. Theoretically inscribed in the objectivist current of international law, he retains above all a certain distrust of interstate voluntarism as the foundation of international law, and prefers a rather pragmatic, rather sociological approach to the combination of social needs and the interest of the subjects of the law. However, he sees in certain developments in international society the confirmation and even a going beyond of what, at the time of Georges Scelle, could still seem like a "dogma", in particular the principle of "functional duplication" according to which States are the necessary and almost exclusive actors of a real international society. “Only the institutional conception of international law opens the way to its authentic improvement following the proven model of domestic law” (Droit international public, Paris, LGDJ, 1976, p. 98). Only to the extent that the imperfections of international law are assumed to be temporary “is it possible to treat international law as part of the law” (ibid.).

Its “fundamental option” is expressed in the following terms: “With the adjustments, clarifications and enrichments provided by the lineage of its supporters, sociological objectivism has won wide support. Not only is this theory attractive because it reflects the profound conviction in the progressive development of international law, but it also provides, on the scientific level, the valid bases for a systematic analysis of the important modifications of this law at the time. contemporary which is that of international solidarity. […] An objectivist conception of international law must be constantly open, attentive and sensitive to the capricious realities of international legal life. Because, if it is a truly essential characteristic of international law, it is because, for a long time yet, it will suffer from the contradictions imposed on it by the sovereignty of the State with which it must coexist” (p. 112).

It is therefore not a revolutionary scientific thought that is expressed in the restrictive framework of its license course included in the first edition of the Public International Law textbook, at the end of the ten years of presentation of this course to the University of Paris. This may also explain the absence or restricted presentation of certain themes, which may have been corrected in later versions, which were aimed at a wider audience.

=== Various fields of research ===
Định has had the opportunity in more specific studies to reject the “extreme” conclusions of Georges Scelle, characteristic of the “idealistic aspect” of his theory; for example by excluding the idea that the incompatibility of two conventional norms can result in the nullity, and not only the unenforceability, of the “irregular” norm.

Can his scientific thinking be taxed as “conservative” in that he does not give sufficient credit to the “Third Worldist” challenge to “classic” international law, so militant in the 1970s? Its rejection of voluntarism as the basis of the obligatory nature of international law explains certain solutions deemed traditionalist, for example the opposability of existing general customs.

== Later life ==
After the end of the Vietnam War he moved to France where he lived out the remainder of his life.
