= Trương Vĩnh Tống =

Vietnamese professor and politician (1884–1974)

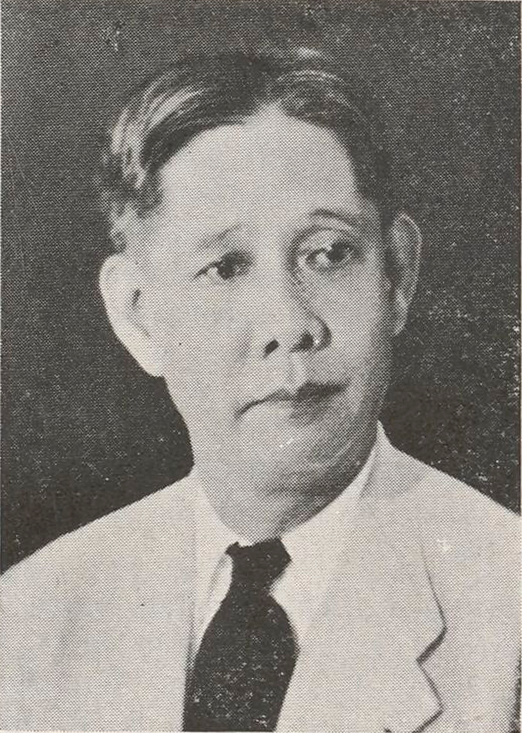
- Tống in 1943

Minister of Foreign Affairs of the State of Vietnam
- In office 25 June 1952 – 9 January 1954
- Prime Minister: Nguyễn Văn Tâm
- Preceded by: Trần Văn Hữu
- Succeeded by: Nguyễn Quốc Định

Personal details
- Born: 11 March 1884 Chợ Lớn, Cochinchina
- Died: 21 August 1974 (aged 90) Paris, France
- Spouse: Elisa Trần Thị Lộ
- Children: 14 (11 sons; 3 daughters)
- Parent: Pétrus Ký (father)
- Relatives: Trương Vĩnh Lễ (grandnephew)
- Profession: Professor; Politician

Trương Vĩnh Tống (11 March 1884 – 21 August 1974) was a Vietnamese professor and politician. He served as the Minister of Foreign Affairs of Vietnam under the premiership of Nguyễn Văn Tâm. He was the youngest son of Vietnamese scholar Pétrus Ký.

== Biography ==
He was born on 11 March 1884 in Chợ Lớn to a family of Catholic Vietnamese intellectuals. His baptismal name was Nicolas. His father was Pétrus Ký, a well known Vietnamese scholar. Since his childhood, he studied in Saigon, after completing his studies in 1903 he went on to serve as a secretary for French Cochinchina government. In 1928 he was forced to retire. Afterward, he became a professor and committed to researching and teaching Vietnamese. In 1947, he participated in the meeting of many figures from non-Communist groups and factions in Vietnam in Hong Kong held by the former emperor Bảo Đại. The meeting discussed the political future of Vietnam. In 1952 he was invited to serve as Minister of Foreign Affairs of the State of Vietnam under the cabinet of Prime Minister Nguyễn Văn Tâm. He also served as the core advisor for the Education Ministry. His wife, Trần Thị Lộ, used to be the President of the Dục Anh Association in Saigon to help raise orphans.

=== Later life ===
In the early 1960s, Tống migrated to France with his family, where he lived for the remainder of his life. His wife, Trần Thị Lộ, died on 20 April 1967. Tống died at the age of 90 in Paris, France.
