= Nguyễn Văn Huyền =

Last Vice President of South Vietnam in 1975

Nguyễn Văn Huyền 阮文玄
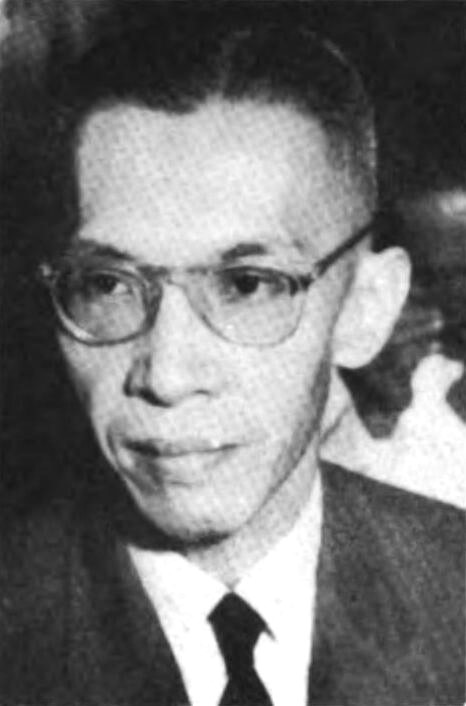
- Huyền in 1964

4th Vice President of South Vietnam
- In office 28 April 1975 – 30 April 1975
- President: Dương Văn Minh
- Prime Minister: Vũ Văn Mẫu
- Preceded by: Trần Văn Hương
- Succeeded by: Position abolished

1st President of the Senate of South Vietnam
- In office 22 December 1967 – 19 January 1973
- Preceded by: Position established
- Succeeded by: Trần Văn Lắm

Member of the Presidium of the Central Committee of the Vietnamese Fatherland Front
- In office 1994–1995
- Chairman: Lê Quang Đạo
- Constituency: Ho Chi Minh City

Personal details
- Born: 9 December 1913 Sóc Trăng, Tân Trụ district, Long An province, Cochinchina, French Indochina
- Died: 1995 (aged 81–82) Ho Chi Minh City, Vietnam
- Party: Independent
- Children: 2 (1 son; 1 daughter)
- Education: University of Indochina (LL.B.)
- Profession: Lawyer; Politician

Nguyễn Văn Huyền (chữ Hán: 阮文玄 9 December 1913 – 1995) was a Vietnamese lawyer and politician, who served as the last Vice President of South Vietnam in April 1975. He took the position of Vice President at President Dương Văn Minh's request, who was trying to hold peace talks but held the position for only two days before the fall of South Vietnam on 30 April 1975. He also served as the first President of the Senate of South Vietnam from December 1967 to January 1973. In the last years of his life, he was invited to join the Vietnam Fatherland Front of the unified Socialist Republic of Vietnam as an independent and was elected as a member of its Central Committee's Presidium, where he died in office in 1995.

== Biography ==
=== Early life and career ===
He was born on 9 December 1913 in Sóc Trăng, Tân Trụ district, Long An province, from a long-standing intellectual Catholic family with highly strong moral background. As a child, he studied in Tân An, then Saigon. In the late 1920s, he went to France to study abroad for a while. After returning home, he studied and graduated with a Bachelor of Laws from the Law School of the University of Indochina in Hanoi.

After practicing as a lawyer in Saigon for a while, he opened his own law office and gradually became known for his defense cases for political defendants such as Hà Huy Tập (1940), Nguyễn Hữu Thọ, Nguyễn Văn Dưỡng, Phan Kiến Khương in the 1950 Peace Movement in Saigon. In the Peace Movement case in 1950, he withdrew from the Bar Association to protest, but still together with lawyers Lê Văn Hổ and Trương Đình Dzu received an unpaid defense for the "defendant" Nguyễn Hữu Thọ. Before the court, he asserted: "Mr. Thọ has great influence on the people. Mr. Thọ has used that influence to do what must be done".

After Ngô Đình Diệm announced the establishment of the Republic of Vietnam and held the position of President, although he was a Catholic intellectual, he kept his attitude of non-cooperation with Ngô Đình Diệm's government to protest the political policy of the regime. Despite this, with his professional reputation and his reputation for ethics and integrity, he was still elected by the legal profession as the leader of the Bar Association. Besides, he also actively participated in Catholic movements independent of the government such as the Vietnam Catholic Action Movement, and the Catholic Intellectual Movement (he also served as President of both movements). He was a member of the Vietnamese delegation to attend the Third International Conference of the Apostolate of the Laity (however he could not go at the last moment for health reasons)

==== Political career ====
After the overthrow and collapse of the government of the First Republic in early November 1963, he was invited to participate in the National Synod, participated in the drafting of the 20 October 1964 Covenant that handed over national sovereignty to the elected representative, replacing it. Provisional Charter 4 November 1963 which placed power in the hands of the military. However, the political scene of the Republic of Vietnam was constantly disturbed by coups and power struggles among generals. It was not until the political scene of the Republic of Vietnam stabilized with the establishment of the Second Republic through the 1967 elections that he ran for the Senate in that year under the banner, "Common Public and Social Justice" partnership (also known as the Bông Huệ Alliance). After being successfully elected as a Senator, he was elected as the first President of the Senate of the Republic of Vietnam on 22 December 1967 with 35 votes, earning 10 votes more than his opponent in the race, former General and Senator Trần Văn Đôn. Initially, against both Ngô Đình Diệm's government and the military regime of General Nguyễn Khánh, he enthusiastically supported the civilian government of President Nguyễn Văn Thiệu. However, not long after, he soon changed his position and turned to oppose President Thiệu. He publicly strongly criticized President Thiệu's one-man election in the 1971 South Vietnamese presidential election, as a result, Huyền's Senate bloc Bông Huệ was later blocked by Thiệu's government from running in the 1973 South Vietnamese Senate election. Thus, he forgoes running for re-election and left the senate once his term expired in 1973.

==== Vice President of South Vietnam (April 1975) ====
In the years that followed, he was active in the Third Force, seeking a solution to end the war. Therefore, when President Trần Văn Hương transferred the presidency to General Dương Văn Minh with approval from the National Assembly, he was invited by General Dương Văn Minh to accept the position of Vice President, with Huyền in charge of leading peace talks. On the morning of 28 April, he led a delegation consisting of him, Prime Minister Vũ Văn Mẫu and Brigadier General Nguyễn Hữu Hạnh to Camp Davies to meet with the military delegation of the Provisional Revolutionary Government of the Republic of South Vietnam. At 3:00 pm, he was officially sworn in as Vice President. At 7:00 pm on the same day, he read a summons on Radio Saigon, reporting on negotiations with the Provisional Revolutionary Government of the Republic of South Vietnam and calling on civilians to respect the law, remain calm, and avoid panic. The army and police forces were ordered to keep order by Huyền. The army and police were able to maintain civility and deter potential robbers and looters.

The following morning, 29 April, he sent another delegation consisting of 4 people, Mr. Nguyễn Văn Diệp (General Manager), Nguyễn Văn Hạnh (contractor), Tô Văn Cang (engineer), Nguyễn Đình Đầu (engineer), to enter Camp Davies to meet with the delegation of the Provisional Revolutionary Government of the Republic of South Vietnam to further discuss about a ceasefire and a coalition government. The result of the meeting was unsuccessful because the Provisional Revolutionary Government of the Republic of South Vietnam was completely sure of a victory. Therefore, he decided to submit to President Dương Văn Minh a draft statement "Accepting the Ceasefire Conditions of the National Front for the Liberation of South Vietnam." Co-written by Mr. Nguyễn Văn Diệp and Mr. Nguyễn Đình Đầu, with the aim of avoiding unnecessary bloodshed. President Dương Văn Minh approved and he published this version on Radio Saigon at 5:00pm on 29 April.

On 30 April, at 6:00am, he, together with President Dương Văn Minh, Prime Minister Vũ Văn Mẫu and some members of the cabinet, had a meeting and decided not to further engage in combat, rather handing over the government to the Provisional Revolutionary Government of the Republic of South Vietnam to avoid further unnecessary bloodshed out in the streets. All were present at the palace until the Liberation Army soldiers entered the Independence Palace.

=== Later life and death ===
After 30 April 1975, Huyền, like other members of General Dương Văn Minh's government, was not sent to re-education camps, but remained under house arrest and monitored by the communist regime. Although some were later allowed to go abroad, he remained in Vietnam and lived quietly in Ho Chi Minh City. He was once invited to join the Vietnamese Fatherland Front, but he declined due to poor health. Until the last years of his life, he accepted an invitation from his old friend Nguyễn Hữu Thọ to join the Vietnamese Fatherland Front, and with the introduction from Nguyễn Hữu Thọ, he was elected a member of the Presidium of the Central Committee of the Vietnam Fatherland Front, a position he served in until his death.

He died in 1995 in Ho Chi Minh City.

=== Personal life ===
He was a devoted practicing Catholic, as a result, his religious belief deeply influenced his character and political beliefs. He was married and had two children. His son is a Catholic priest, while his daughter is a nun. Later in his career, Huyền was a member of the Third Force, a group of intellectuals living and working under the Republic of Vietnam that opposed the authoritarian tactics of the regime, and the communist regime in Hanoi. He was also known as a virtuous and honest man, who, despite being in high positions of power, still lived an ascetic life. Throughout his political career, he has not been involved in any financial or political ethics scandals or mistreated his colleagues or dissidents. Therefore, although he has a gentle personality, he still has a great reputation and influence on those around him.

"Mr. Huyền is not a Communist but a religious person and a good person. When the Pope called for peace, Mr. Huyền aimed to end the war and restore peace. By 1975, Dương Văn Minh established the government and invited Mr. Huyền to be the Vice President in charge of peace talks." - Researcher Nguyễn Đình Đầu
"You are a patriotic intellectual. I always thought that you cannot leave your country." - Lawyer Nguyễn Hữu Thọ, former acting President of the Socialist Republic of Vietnam

Political offices
Preceded by Position established	President of the Senate of South Vietnam; 1967–1973	Succeeded by Trần Văn Lắm
Preceded by Trần Văn Hương	Vice President of South Vietnam; 1975	Succeeded by Position abolished
