= Eugène Dejean de La Bâtie =

- Eugène Dejean de La Bâtie in the 1930s
- Born: 1898; Hanoi, Vietnam
- Died: December 31, 1948 (aged 50); Saigon, Vietnam
- Occupation: Journalist

Eugène Dejean de La Bâtie (1898-1948) was a major figure of the Indochinese journalism during the period between the two World Wars. In the beginning of the 1920s, gifted with a rare skill in polemics, he was with Nguyễn Phan Long, one of the best representatives of the progressive native press in French Indochina. Throughout those years, willing to distance himself from those who advocated a direct confrontation against the colonial regime, his attitude evolved toward a more prudent moderation.

== Biography ==
Maurice Henri Eugène Dejean de La Bâtie was born in Hanoi in 1898. Son of a French diplomat, Marie-Joseph Maurice Dejean de La Bâtie, and a Vietnamese woman, Dang thi Khai, he obtained the acknowledgment of paternity from his father in 1920. He passed his high school degree at the school of Puginier of Hanoi, then went on studying and graduated from the School of Public Works of the University of Hanoi. For a few months, he worked as a land surveyor. Very soon after his military service, he switched fields to become a publicist, a term commonly used at that time.

== Beginnings of a career of journalist ==
Eugene Dejean de La Bâtie began his career in journalism at the beginning of the twenties in Saigon, Cochinchina. In 1923, he was Editor in Chief of La Voix annamite (The Annamite Voice); it was under this title that he joined the Cochinchinese Press Syndicate which was then presided over by Henry de Chavigny de Lachevrotière. In 1924, he was found again at L'Écho annamite (The Annamite Echo) managed by Nguyen Phan Long. In April 1925, he wrote an article : «Why we don't wish for the Annamite people their immediate liberation from the French guardianship». In this article, Dejean took up a somewhat ambiguous attitude: he rejected the argument of those who justified the French presence by the fact that Vietnam was unable to attain its independence even when it envied its neighbors (China and Japan); but at the same time he thought that the Annamite people needed France to implement its modernization.

== Collaboration with Paul Monin and André Malraux ==
In June 1925, he became a collaborator of the daily newspaper L'Indochine (The Indochina) created by Paul Monin and André Malraux. In issue 6 of L'Indochine (dated June 23. 1925) he explained why he left L'Écho annamite. Clara Malraux related in her Memories that, foreseeing that people could blame him for abandoning the Annamites to the Europeans, without delay he had specified his viewpoint: «for the majority of Annamites, the only name of Monin is a guarantee of the pro–annamite tendencies of The Indochina newspaper ... Being neither meat nor fish, I have the noticeable advantage to be of the two at the same time! But my natural inclination rather incites me to lean toward the weak...» Eugène Dejean de La Bâtie participated actively in the struggle led by Monin and Malraux for the grant of democratic rights to natives: freedom of movement, of meeting, of expression, with authorization of a free press in Vietnamese.

The friendship of Dejean and of Malraux is illustrated by the following anecdote, which stemmed from a disagreement of the team at L'Indochine with Le Quang Trinh, the director of Le progrès annamite (The Annamite Progress), a newspaper supported by the colonial administration. Le progrès annamite relates in its own way the unexpected visit to Mr. Le Quang Trinh by Mr. Malraux accompanied by Mr Dejean de La Bâtie following the article containing offensive insinuations toward the ruling class of Indochina: «Very pleasantly, Le Quang Trinh held out his hand to Mr. Malraux. The latter, while introducing himself, took care not to shake it. With a pale face and tight lips, Mr. Malraux threatened the worst retaliations if I began to talk again in my newspaper of any bas-relief. According to Le Quang Trinh who calmly but sharply replied to Mr. Malraux, the effect of his speech have been crushing: "the hot tempered gentleman had disappeared followed by his faithful squire [Dejean]". And Nguyen Phan Long, author of the article goes on saying facetiously: «We didn't know that Mr Le Quang Trinh had such a chastised eloquence and with such a crushing efficacity».

Nevertheless, noting the disagreement which appeared between Monin and Malraux, Dejean de La Bâtie left L'Indochine. Together with his friend Nguyễn An Ninh, they began to republish La Cloche fêlée (The Cracked Bell), which had ceased to exist in June 1924. The two men then offered its management to Phan Van Truong, a lawyer of French citizenship, who had been a companion of the future Hô Chi Minh in Paris in the early twenties. During that time Dejean de La Bâtie approved and supported the nationalist aspirations of his Vietnamese compatriots.

== Distancing from the Vietnamese nationalists and communists ==
For many months, Dejean supplied written materials to La Cloche fêlée without however giving up writing for L'Écho annamite. After the arrest of Nguyen An Ninh in April 1926 (accused of anti French activities), La Cloche fêlée was closed. Eugène Dejean de La Bâtie created a new newspaper with Phan Van Truong, L'Annam, which tone would be even more offensive to the colonial administration than that of La Cloche fêlée. But then Dejean had a disagreement with Phan Van Truong over one of their collaborators, Nguyen Pho, whom Truong thought to be an informant of the Security. Dejean was convinced that Nguyen Pho was not a traitor, but was unable to make Truong share his belief.

Becoming the director of L'Écho annamite, Dejean de La Bâtie developed essays which led him to clearly condemn the communist positions. A few months before the closing of the publication of the daily paper, in 1931, he was injured in a road accident. A rumor spread out in Saigon that he was the victim of a communist attempt. Eugène replied with his usual humor: " I would have been a victim of a blow from an axe. Why not one from a sickle or a hammer?"

In the 1930s, Dejean de La Bâtie, joined the socialists of Indochina and contributed to their daily newspaper, Le Populaire (The Popular). A few years later, he was found again in the newspaper L'Alerte (Alert), under the direction of a Mr. Fauquenot who turned out to be a spy in the service of the Japanese. Dejean de La Bâtie was not compromised in this affair, but L'Alerte could not survive this torment.

In 1938, Dejean de La Bâtie contributed to the rebirth of The Annamite Echo which stopped being published in April 1931. However, in the early 1940s, he was forced to accept that the content of his newspaper L'Écho annamite, be submitted to censorship by the petainist regime of Admiral Decoux, for which he would be blamed at the end of the war.

Eugène Dejean de La Bâtie died of illness, in Saigon on December 31. 1948, at the age of 50. He had a habit of lowering his age down during conversations, leading many to believe he was 46-48 at the time of his death.

== Bibliography ==
- Clara Malraux, Le Bruit des nos pas, Les Combats et les jeux, Grasset, 1969, p. 161.
- Yves Le Jariel, L'Ami oublié de Malraux en Indochine, Paul Monin, Les Indes savantes, 2014.
