= Phạm Đăng Lâm =

South Vietnamese diplomat and politician (1918–1975)

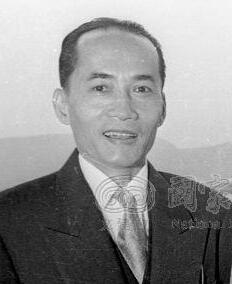
- Lâm in 1963

Deputy Prime Minister of South Vietnam
- In office 9 November 1967 – 18 May 1968
- Prime Minister: Nguyễn Văn Lộc
- Preceded by: Nguyễn Hữu Có; Nguyễn Lưu Viên
- Succeeded by: Trần Thiện Khiêm

Minister of Foreign Affairs of South Vietnam
- In office 4 November 1964 – 16 February 1965
- Prime Minister: Trần Văn Hương; Nguyễn Xuân Oánh (Acting)
- Preceded by: Phan Huy Quát
- Succeeded by: Trần Văn Đỗ
- In office 4 November 1963 – 30 January 1964
- Prime Minister: Nguyễn Ngọc Thơ
- Preceded by: Trương Công Cừu
- Succeeded by: Phan Huy Quát

Personal details
- Born: 12 June 1918 Vĩnh Long, Cochinchina, French Indochina
- Died: 2 June 1975 (aged 56) Paris, France
- Party: Independent (since 1963)
- Other political affiliations: Cần Lao (until 1963)
- Education: University of Hanoi (Lic. MA)

Phạm Đăng Lâm (Vietnamese pronunciation: [faːm˧˨ʔ ʔɗaŋ˧˧ ləm˧˧]; 12 June 1918 – 2 June 1975) was a South Vietnamese diplomat who served as Minister of Foreign Affairs of South Vietnam from November 1963 to January 1964 and again from November 1964 to February 1965. He served as Deputy Prime Minister of South Vietnam from 1967 to 1968 under Prime Minister Nguyễn Văn Lộc. He was the last South Vietnamese ambassador to the UK. He was known for being the chief negotiator on the South Vietnamese side in the 1973 Paris Peace Talks to end the Vietnam War and the co-existence of North Vietnam and South Vietnam.

== Early life ==
He was born on 12 June 1916 in Vĩnh Long, Cochinchina, French Indochina. He earned a Licentiate from the University of Hanoi and a graduate degree in Indochinese Higher studies of Law in 1955.

== Political career ==
He has been a diplomat in the Ministry of Foreign Affairs since 1949, serving in both the State of Vietnam and South Vietnam.

=== Paris Peace Accords ===
On the morning of 27 November 1972 Lâm met with the head of the U.S. Delegation of the Paris Peace Accords, William J. Porter to discuss the drafting of the Peace documents. After the meeting Porter reported to Henry Kissinger regarding Lâm's thought,

"He [Lâm] stressed need for preparing Saigon psychologically for draft agreement. He said that when agreement was presented in Saigon by you, it had come as a ‘bomb’ because Ambassador Bunker had briefed President Thiệu that October 8–11 meetings had produced indications of serious DRV intention to negotiate and willingness to separate military from political issues, but nothing more than this bare outline. Thus when draft agreement was presented as best which would be achieved at that time, Saigon leadership did not understand fully why the United States believed that to be so."

"Lâm said question of U.S. public opinion and Congressional support is major factor which had not been grasped earlier by Saigon, and that you also said some very important things about US/SVN relationships after conclusion of the accord. If these things had been grasped earlier by Saigon, they would have greatly helped the process of psychological preparation."

At the Paris Peace Accords, regarding both North Vietnam and South Vietnam, Lâm stresses that such co-existence must be based on mutual respect and the right of the people of North and South Vietnam to follow whatever paths they have chosen. He added that this also meant North and South Vietnam could have friendly relations with neighboring countries. If the Paris Peace Accords live up to its role, Lâm states "The solidarity of Southeast Asia will then become a living reality." According to Lâm, for peace and solidarity to occur in Southeast Asia, it requires work and effort from everyone worldwide to maintain it.

== Personal life ==
In addition to his native Vietnamese, Lam was also fluent in French and English.

He died on 2 June 1975 in Paris after a long battle with an illness.
