= Nguyễn Văn Lộc =

Prime Minister of South Vietnam from 1967 to 1968

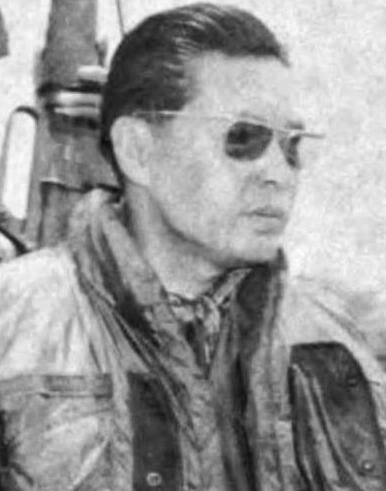
- Lộc in 1968

6th Prime Minister of South Vietnam
- In office 31 October 1967 – 18 May 1968
- President: Nguyễn Văn Thiệu
- Deputy: Phạm Đăng Lâm
- Preceded by: Nguyễn Cao Kỳ (as Chairman of Central Executive Committee)
- Succeeded by: Trần Văn Hương

Personal details
- Born: 24 August 1922 Vĩnh Long Province, Cochinchina, French Indochina
- Died: 31 May 1992 (aged 69) Yvelines, France
- Party: Independent
- Other political affiliations: Military (1963–1967)
- Spouses: Nguyễn Mông Hoa (1953–?); Nguyễn Thị Mai (1984–1992)
- Children: 6
- Education: University of Montpellier (LL.B.); University of Paris (MA)

Nguyễn Văn Lộc (Vietnamese: [ŋwiən˦ˀ˥ van˧˧ ləwk͡p̚˧˨ʔ]; 24 August 1922 – 31 May 1992) was a South Vietnamese educator, lawyer, and politician who served as Prime Minister of South Vietnam between 31 October 1967 and 18 May 1968. Lộc's second wife, Nguyễn Thị Mai, would be the subject of a biography, Black Silk Pajamas in 2000.

== Biography ==
=== Early life and education ===
Nguyễn Văn Lộc was born on 24 August 1922, in Long Chau village, Chau Thanh district – Vinh Long (now Vinh Long City, Vinh Long Province) to a wealthy family. From 1950 to 1955, Lộc studied abroad in France and the United Kingdom, where he obtained a bachelor's degree in law from the University of Montpellierin 1954, and a master's degree in criminal law from the University of Paris in 1964. In 1965, Lộc went on to study more about international law in the Netherlands at The Hague Academy of International Law.

=== Career ===
In 1945, he participated in the Anti-French War of Resistance, commonly known as the First Indochina War, in which he served as the editor-in-chief of an underground newspaper called La Lutte. After realizing the communist nature of the Việt Minh, he left and returned to Saigon, publishing and printing newspapers.

==== Political career ====
From 1955, Lộc became a lawyer of the Saigon High Court until 1964, when he was elected Chairman of the Civil-Military Council (Hội Đồng Dân Quân, the legislature during the transition from a military government to an elected government). In 1967, Nguyễn Cao Kỳ invited Lộc to join him in the 1967 South Vietnamese presidential election as his running mate, being the vice presidential candidate. After deciding to run jointly with Nguyễn Văn Thiệu, being his running mate as the vice presidential candidate, Kỳ asked Lộc to withdraw. To compensate Lộc, Kỳ asked Thiệu to appoint Lộc as the prime minister of the government.

==== Prime Minister of South Vietnam (1967–1968) ====
On 31 October 1967, Lộc was appointed by President Thiệu to be the first Prime Minister of the Second Republic of Vietnam. On 9 November 1967, Prime Minister Lộc presented his cabinet:

- Deputy Minister (Diplomacy): Phạm Đăng Lâm
- Foreign Minister: Doctor Trần Văn Đỗ
- Defense Minister: Lieutenant General Nguyễn Văn Vy
- Interior Minister: Lieutenant General Linh Quang Viên
- Minister of Rural Construction: Lieutenant General Nguyễn Đức Thắng
- Economic Minister: Trương Thái Tôn
- Finance Minister: Lưu Văn Tính
- Minister of Culture and Education: Professor Tăng Kim Đồng
- Minister of Labor: Professor Phó Bá Long
- Minister of Health: Doctor Trần Lữ Y
- Minister of Public Works: Bửu Đôn
- Minister of Justice: Huỳnh Đức Bửu
- Minister for Ethnic Development: Paul Nur
- Minister of Agriculture and Land: Tôn Thất Trình
- Minister of Social Affairs and Refugees: Dr. Nguyễn Phúc Quế
- Transport Minister: Lương Thái Siêu

Education Ministers: Trần Lưu Cung (Education; in charge of Universities and Specializations), Professor Lê Trọng Vinh (Education; in charge of First, Secondary and High School), Law. Professor Hồ Thới Sang (Education; in charge of School Youth). Professor Bùi Xuân Bào (Culture), Nguyễn Chánh Lý (Commerce), Võ Văn Nhung (Technology). Professor Nguyễn Văn Tường and Đoàn Bá Cang hold the positions of Ministers of the Prime Minister's Office.

During his tenure as prime minister, he made state visits to Australia, New Zealand, the Philippines, the US, Brazil, and Japan.

After the 1968 Tet Offensive, he was criticized and forced to resign. Since then, he has retired from politics and turned to teaching: 1969, university, An Giang (Vietnam); teacher, Hoa Ha 1971, director, Cao Dai University, Tai Ninh (Vietnam).

=== Fall of Saigon ===
On 30 April 1975, when South Vietnam collapsed to the advancing forces of North Vietnam and the Viet Cong, Lộc like other high-ranking government and military officials of the Saigon government that stayed behind were sent to re-education camp operated by the new Communist Vietnamese government. In an interview with the New York Times, Lộc describes in the re-education camps he and other inmates were forced to perform hard labor such as clearing the jungles, swamps, and minefields to build dams and farming. He mentions the conditions of the camps were so brutal that two or three people within the camps would die every week from malnutrition or illnesses In 1980, after spending five brutal years in the re-education camp, the Communist government decided to let Lộc return to Saigon (now Ho Chi Minh City). Lộc explains:

I nearly died in the labor camp, where I was kept with about 1,500 others on a near-starvation diet; they let me return to Saigon in 1980 only after they felt that I was dying.

== Exile attempts and success ==
Lộc attempted to leave Vietnam 14 times before successfully making it to Singapore on 10 May 1983 as a refugee with his wife and their eleven-month-old infant. He later settled in Houston, Texas with his wife, Nguyễn Thị Mai, with whom he would have three more children. He died in Yvelines, France in May 1992 at the age of 69.

Political offices
Preceded by Nguyễn Cao Kỳ	Prime Minister of the Republic of Vietnam; 1967–1968	Succeeded by Trần Văn Hương
