= Trần Văn Hữu =

Prime Minister of the State of Vietnam from 1950 to 1952

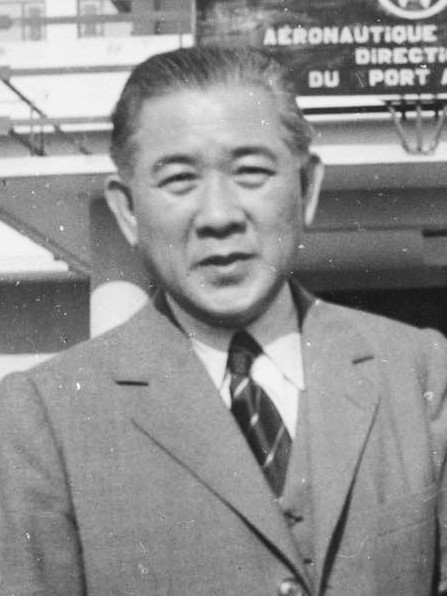
- Hữu arriving at Tân Sơn Nhất Airport in 1949

3rd Prime Minister of the State of Vietnam
- In office 7 May 1950 – 3 June 1952
- Deputy: Phan Huy Quát (1950–1951); Nguyễn Khắc Vệ (1951–1952)
- Chief of State: Bảo Đại
- Preceded by: Nguyễn Phan Long
- Succeeded by: Nguyễn Văn Tâm

Minister of Foreign Affairs of the State of Vietnam
- In office 7 May 1950 – 20 June 1952
- Prime Minister: Himself
- Preceded by: Nguyễn Phan Long
- Succeeded by: Trương Vĩnh Tống

Deputy Chief of the Provisional Central Government of Vietnam
- In office 5 June 1948 – 11 June 1949
- Chief: Nguyễn Văn Xuân
- Preceded by: Position established
- Succeeded by: Position abolished

4th President of the Autonomous Republic of Cochinchina
- In office 27 May 1948 – 4 June 1949
- Preceded by: Nguyễn Văn Xuân
- Succeeded by: Position abolished

Deputy President of the Autonomous Republic of Cochinchina
- In office 8 October 1947 – 27 May 1948
- President: Nguyễn Văn Xuân
- Preceded by: Nguyễn Văn Xuân
- Succeeded by: Position abolished

Personal details
- Born: 9 March 1896 Vinh Long, Cochinchina, French Indochina
- Died: 17 January 1984 (aged 87) Paris, France
- Party: Independent

Trần Văn Hữu (Vietnamese: [t͡ɕən˨˩ van˧˧ hiw˦ˀ˥]; 9 March 1896 – 17 January 1984) served as president of Cochinchina's government from 1948 to 1949, and as Prime Minister of the State of Vietnam of the State of Vietnam from 1950 to 1952.

== Early life ==
Born in 1896 in Long My village, Chau Thanh district, Vinh Long province (now Thanh Duc commune, Long Ho district, Vinh Long province), he came from a wealthy landowning family. His house was in the same village as Trần Văn Hương (who later became Prime Minister of the Republic of Vietnam), while Phạm Hùng's house (who later became Prime Minister of the Socialist Republic of Vietnam) was located across the Long Hồ River (in Long Phuoc village). His father held a prominent position in the village. As a young man, Tran Van Huu studied under the French curriculum. Later, he studied in France and graduated with a degree in agricultural engineering. Upon returning home, he worked at a real estate bank.

== Political career ==
On September 23, 1945, after the August Revolution and the establishment of the Democratic Republic of Vietnam, the French army opened fire to occupy Saigon, initiating the Indochina War. With the aim of restoring colonial rule in Vietnam and Indochina, France established the pro-French "Autonomous Cochinchina" government, marking Tran Van Huu's entry into politics. In July 1946, he attended the Fontainebleau conference as a member of the French delegation aboard the French ship Dumont Durville.

In December 1946, a pro-French cabinet led by Dr. Le Van Hoach was established in Cochinchina, and Tran Van Huu was appointed Minister of Finance. Due to the unstable political situation, many civil servants resigned or left for resistance zones. In response, Tran Van Huu increased wages for civil servants, encouraging them to return to government service. However, the Le Van Hoach government proved ineffective, leading to the establishment of a new government led by Lieutenant General Nguyen Van Xuan.

In 1947, before returning to the country to form a government, former emperor Bao Dai invited figures such as Ngo Dinh Diem, Phan Huy Quat, Le Van Hoach, Tran Van Huu, and Nguyen Ton Hoan to meet in Hong Kong. In October 1947, Tran Van Huu was promoted to deputy prime minister in the new administration. He reorganized the administrative apparatus from the central to local levels, bringing more Vietnamese into positions of power in an effort to create a credible government of the Vietnamese people. However, these efforts were largely symbolic, as the French colonial government, both civilian and military, remained the dominant force.

== Life abroad ==
After Ngô Đình Diệm came to power in South Vietnam in 1954, he lived in France and worked to undermine the Diệm regime. Hữu led the Committee for Peace and Renewal of South Vietnam, an organization that advocated for peace and the neutralization of Vietnam during the Cold War. As part of this effort, he visited Pope Paul VI and United Nations Secretary General U Thant in 1966.

Due to his lobbying and past political position, Hữu was seen as an ally of the National Liberation Front (NLF) in Paris. In 1969, the NLF leadership proposed Hữu as a potential minister in a new NLF government.

Political offices
Preceded by Nguyễn Văn Xuân	Deputy Prime Minister of the Autonomous Republic of Cochinchina; 1947-1948	Succeeded by Position abolished
Preceded by Position established	Deputy Chief of the Provisional Central Government of Vietnam; 1948-1949	Succeeded by Position abolished
Preceded by Nguyễn Phan Long	Prime Minister of the State of Vietnam; 1950-1952	Succeeded by Nguyễn Văn Tâm
Preceded by Lê Thăng	Minister of Foreign Affairs of the State of Vietnam; 1950-1952	Succeeded by Trương Vĩnh Tống
