= Nguyễn Phan Long =

Prime Minister of the State of Vietnam in 1950

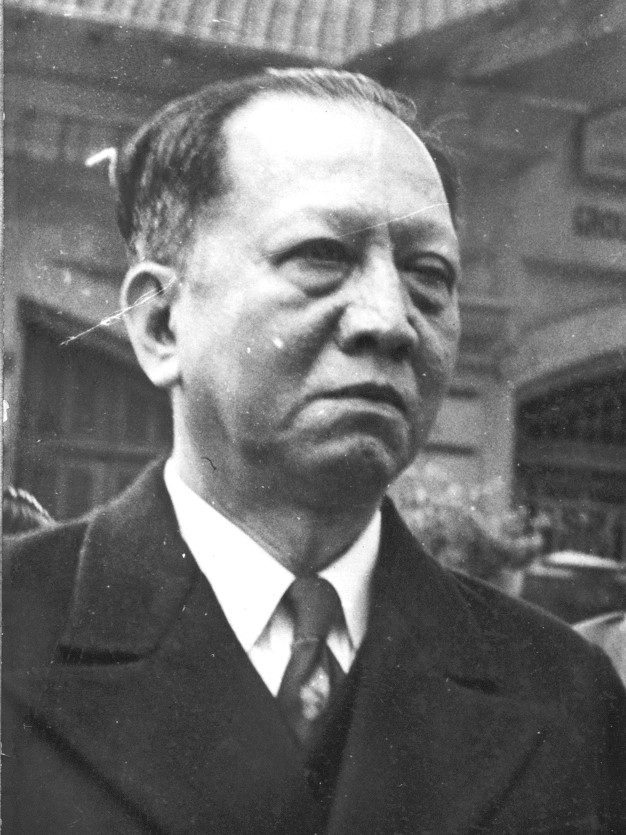
- Long in Hanoi, January 1950

2nd Prime Minister of the State of Vietnam
- In office 20 January 1950 – 27 April 1950
- Deputy: Phan Huy Quát
- Head of State: Bảo Đại
- Preceded by: Nguyễn Văn Xuân
- Succeeded by: Trần Văn Hữu

Minister of Foreign Affairs of the State of Vietnam
- In office 1 July 1949 – 1 May 1950
- Prime Minister: Bảo Đại; Himself
- Preceded by: Position established
- Succeeded by: Trần Văn Hữu

Personal details
- Born: 1888 Saigon, Cochinchina, French Indochina
- Died: 16 July 1960 (aged 72) Saigon, South Vietnam
- Party: Constitutional Party
- Spouse: Trần Thị Nguyên
- Education: Lycée Albert Sarraut
- Profession: Journalist; Politician

Nguyễn Phan Long (Vietnamese: [ŋwiən˦ˀ˥ faːn˧˧ lawŋ͡m˧˧]; 1888 – 16 July 1960) was a Vietnamese journalist and politician who served as Prime Minister of the State of Vietnam from 20 January to 27 April in 1950. He was dismissed by the Head of State Bảo Đại under pressure from the French colonial authorities, who resented his pro-American and nationalist attitude.

== Early life and career ==
He was born in Saigon in 1888. He was sent to Hanoi to be educated at the Lycée Albert Sarraut, afterward, he returned to Saigon to work as a high school teacher and a journalist. In 1917 he worked for the La Tribune Indigène and in 1920, he founded the liberal newspaper L'Écho Annamite, in which he worked with the (Eurasian) Vietnamese nationalist Eugène Dejean de la Bâtie, friend of André Malraux. During his time as a journalist, Long would write about spiritualism and the Vietnamese religion Caodaism.

=== Political career ===
In the 1920s–1930s, he was the deputy leader of the Parti Constitutionnaliste Indochinois, a nationalist party founded in 1923 and led by Bui Quang Chiêu. He was elected as colonial councillor.

He was elected in 1936 as president of the Congrès Universel des Sectes Caodaïques, an attempted unified caodai movement, which eventually failed.

After 1945, he was Minister of Foreign Affairs and Minister of Interior as well as editor of L'Écho du Vietnam.

== Personal life and death ==
He was an ardent follower of Caodaism and spoke fluent French. He was married to Trần Thị Nguyên. He died in Saigon on 16 July 1960 at the age of 71.

== Sources ==
- R. B. Smith, "Bui Quang Chiêu and the Constitutionalist Party in French Cochinchina, 1917–30", Modern Asian Studies (1969), 3:131-150 Cambridge University Press
- Micheline R. Lessard, "Organisons-nous! Racial Antagonism and Vietnamese Economic Nationalism in the Early Twentieth Century", French Colonial History – Volume 8, 2007, pp. 171–201
- Christopher E. Goscha, "Widening the Colonial Encounter: Asian Connections Inside French Indochina During the Interwar Period", Modern Asian Studies (Published online by Cambridge University Press) 16 Oct 2008 (abstract)

Political offices
| Preceded by Bảo Đại | Prime Minister of the State of Vietnam; 1950 | Succeeded by Trần Văn Hữu |
