= Camp Davies (Vietnam) =

U.S. Army and Army of the Republic of Vietnam logistics base in Vietnam

Camp Davies
- Saigon Port, Ho Chi Minh City in Vietnam
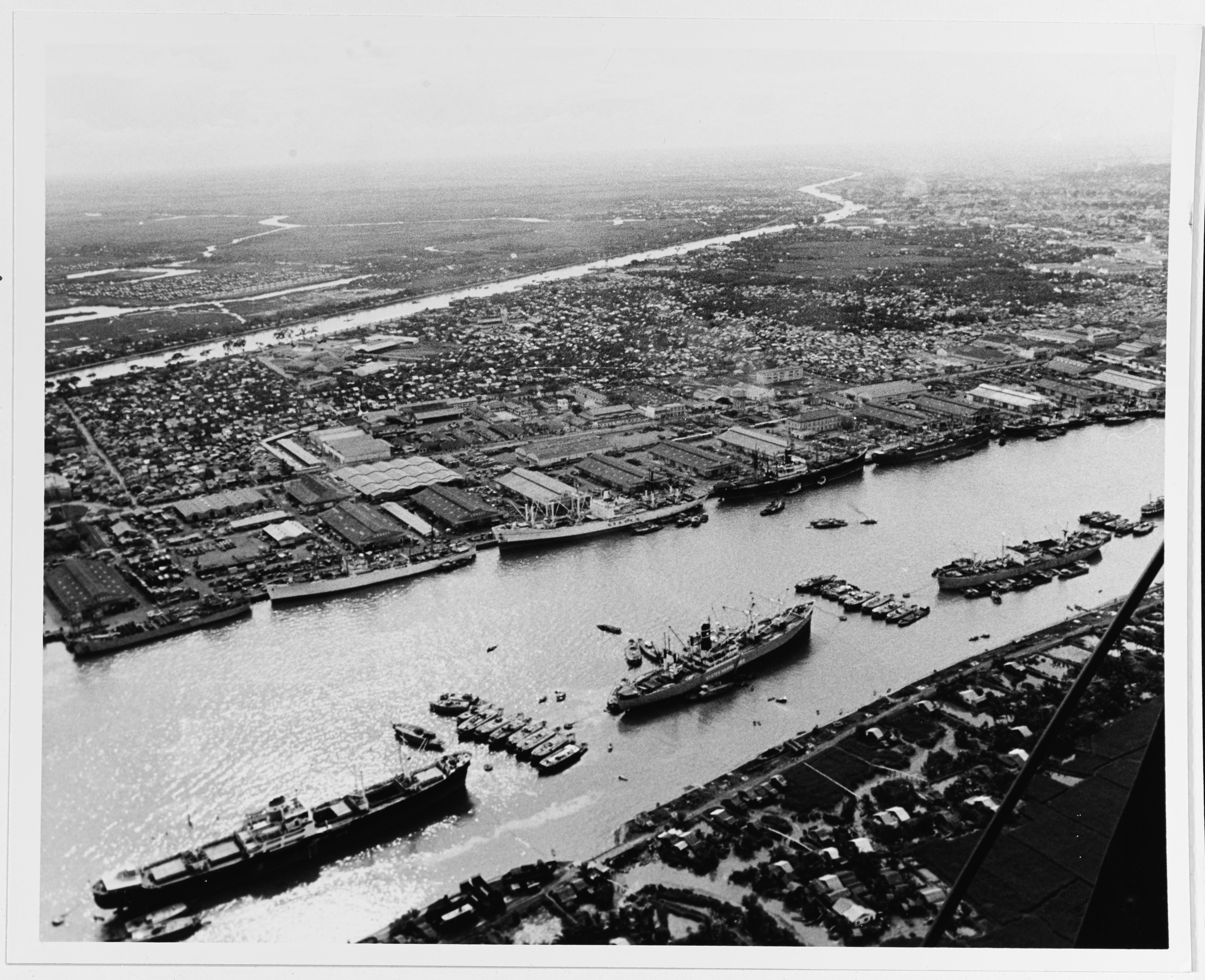
- Camp Davies in December 1965

Site information
- Type: Army base
- Operator: Army of the Republic of Vietnam (ARVN); United States Army (U.S. Army)
- Condition: Abandoned

Location
- Shown within Vietnam
- Coordinates: 10.758°N 106.732°E

Site history
- Built: 1965
- In use: 1965-1975
- Battles/wars: Vietnam War

Camp Davies was a U.S. Army and Army of the Republic of Vietnam (ARVN) logistics base located on the Saigon River 2 miles (3.2 km) east of Saigon in southern Vietnam.

== History ==
Davies was located approximately 2 miles (3.2 km) east of Saigon Port.

The camp consisted of over 140 buildings, cantonment facilities for over 1,000 men, field maintenance and storage facilities and 350m of dockage space for harbor craft.

On 29 April 1970 the camp was transferred to the ARVN 3rd Area Logistics Command which based the Saigon Transportation Terminal Command at the site.

== Current use ==
The base remains in commercial use.
