= Bửu Lộc =

State of Vietnam's Prime Minister 1953–1954

Nguyễn Phúc Bửu Lộc
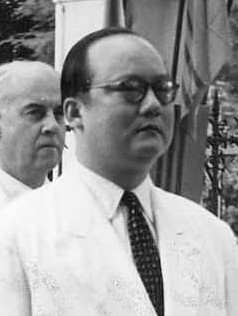
- Prince Bửu Lộc in 1954

5th Prime Minister of the State of Vietnam
- In office 17 December 1953 – 16 June 1954
- Deputy: Nguyễn Trung Vinh
- Chief of State: Bảo Đại
- Preceded by: Nguyễn Văn Tâm
- Succeeded by: Ngô Đình Diệm

Personal details
- Born: 22 August 1914 Thừa Thiên Huế, Annam, French Indochina
- Died: 27 February 1990 (aged 75) Paris, France
- Party: Independent
- Spouse: Pacteau
- Children: Jean-François Nguyễn Phúc Vĩnh Lộc (son)

Prince Nguyễn Phúc Bửu Lộc (Vietnamese: [ŋwiən˦ˀ˥ fʊwk͡p̚˧˦ ʔɓiw˧˩ ləwk͡p̚˧˨ʔ]; 22 August 1914 – 27 February 1990), was an uncle of Emperor Bảo Đại, and Prime Minister of the State of Vietnam in 1954.

He was a great-great-grandson of Emperor Minh Mạng, the second emperor of the Nguyễn dynasty. Both his great-grandfather (Nguyễn Phúc Miên Trinh) and grandfather (Nguyễn Phúc Hường Thiết) were distinguished poets during the reign of Nguyễn dynasty. He later emigrated to Paris and spent his life there until his death in 1990.

== Early life ==
In his youth, he attended high school in Lycée Albert-Sarraut, Hanoi and later studied Law at the University of Montpellier.

== Career ==
He was Bảo Đại's Chief of Staff in 1948, then appointed the special representative of the State of Vietnam to the United Nations General Assembly.

In April 1949, he re-affirmed Vietnam's sovereignty over the Paracel Islands. In 1951, he was the president of the Royal Society in Paris and the High Representative of Vietnam in France.

Later, Chief of State Bảo Đại appointed him Minister of the Interior of the State of Vietnam. On 17 December 1953, when Prime Minister Nguyễn Văn Tâm submitted his resignation, Bửu Lộc was assigned to form a new cabinet. On 11 January 1954, Bảo Đại issued Decree No. 4/CP approving the new cabinet list. Prince Bửu Lộc then served as Prime Minister from 11 January to 16 June 1954. On 4 June 1954, he signed an agreement with France, making Vietnam fully independent within the French Union. He resigned and was succeeded by Ngô Đình Diệm.

== Family ==
In 1958, he married a French woman named Pacteau. They had one child, a son, Jean-François Nguyễn Phúc Vĩnh Lộc (born 18 October 1959).

He died in 1990 in Paris, aged 75.

Political offices
Preceded by Nguyễn Văn Tâm	Prime Minister of the State of Vietnam; 1954	Succeeded by Ngô Đình Diệm
