= Nguyễn Văn Tâm =

Prime Minister of the State of Vietnam from 1952 to 1953

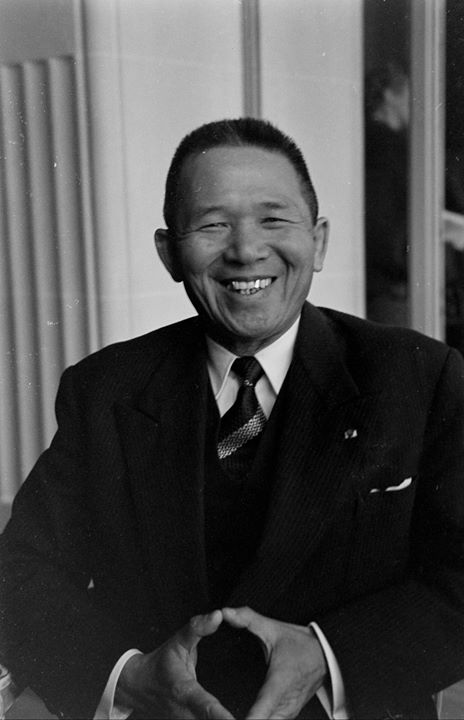
- Tâm in 1953

4th Prime Minister of the State of Vietnam
- In office 6 June 1952 – 17 December 1953
- Deputy: Phan Văn Giáo (1952–1953); Ngô Thúc Địch (1952–1953); Lê Văn Hoạch (1953); Nguyễn Huy Lai (1953)
- Head of State: Bảo Đại
- Preceded by: Trần Văn Hữu
- Succeeded by: Prince Bửu Lộc

Personal details
- Born: 16 October 1895 Tây Ninh, Cochinchina, French Indochina
- Died: 23 November 1990 (aged 95) Paris, France
- Spouse: Nguyễn Thị Cẩm Vân
- Children: Nguyễn Văn Hinh (son)
- Relatives: Jonathan Van-Tam (grandson)

Nguyễn Văn Tâm (Vietnamese: [ŋwiən˦ˀ˥ van˧˧ təm˧˧]; 16 October 1895 – 23 November 1990) served as Prime Minister of the State of Vietnam, an associated country within the French Union. He held that office from June 1952 to December 1953.

== Early life ==
Born on 16 October 1895 in Tây Ninh Province during the French colonial period, Nguyễn Văn Tâm was originally a school teacher who was picked by the French in the early 1940s to be the District Chief of Cai Lậy, in Cochinchina. Here in the Mekong Delta, he had already earned the nickname Tiger of Cai Lậy as a notorious torturer of peasants during the revolts of the 1930s.

He is the paternal grandfather of Jonathan Van-Tam, former Deputy Chief Medical Officer for England, UK.

== Career ==
After the August Revolution, following the Japanese surrender in 1945, Tâm was imprisoned by the new Viet Minh authorities for crimes against the people but was soon freed by the returning French military.

He was among the government ministers presented on June 1, 1946, at the proclamation of the "Republic of Cochinchina"—a first, abortive, attempt of the French to create a post-colonial client state. "Premier" Nguyen van Tinh was so humiliated by the French that after six months he hanged himself. When in 1949, in agreement with the Bảo Đại the French created the State of Vietnam, Tâm was sent north as governor of Tonkin to do battle with the communist-insurgent Democratic Republic of Vietnam. In June 1952 he became Prime Minister while his son, Nguyễn Văn Hinh, was appointed Chief of Staff of the French auxiliary Vietnamese National Army. He resigned his premiership on 12 January 1954 and was replaced by prince Bửu Lộc.

During Tâm's premiership, there were many stories and anecdotes poking fun of Tâm. For example, one tale claimed he was once gifted a huge banner proclaiming him "Outstanding among all officials", which he graciously accepted. However, unknown to Tâm, the characters on the banner could alternatively be read as "the dog Tam" or "houseboy of the West." Anthropologist Neil L. Jamieson notes that many of these stories were likely false, but they nevertheless indicate that his subordinates' were deeply unhappy with his way of governing. Tâm also likely found them quite humiliating and seriously detrimental to his prestige.

From 1955 he lived in exile in the United States.

Political offices
Preceded by Trần Văn Hữu	Prime Minister of the State of Vietnam; 1952–1953	Succeeded by Prince Nguyễn Phúc Bửu Lộc
