= List of leaders of South Vietnam =

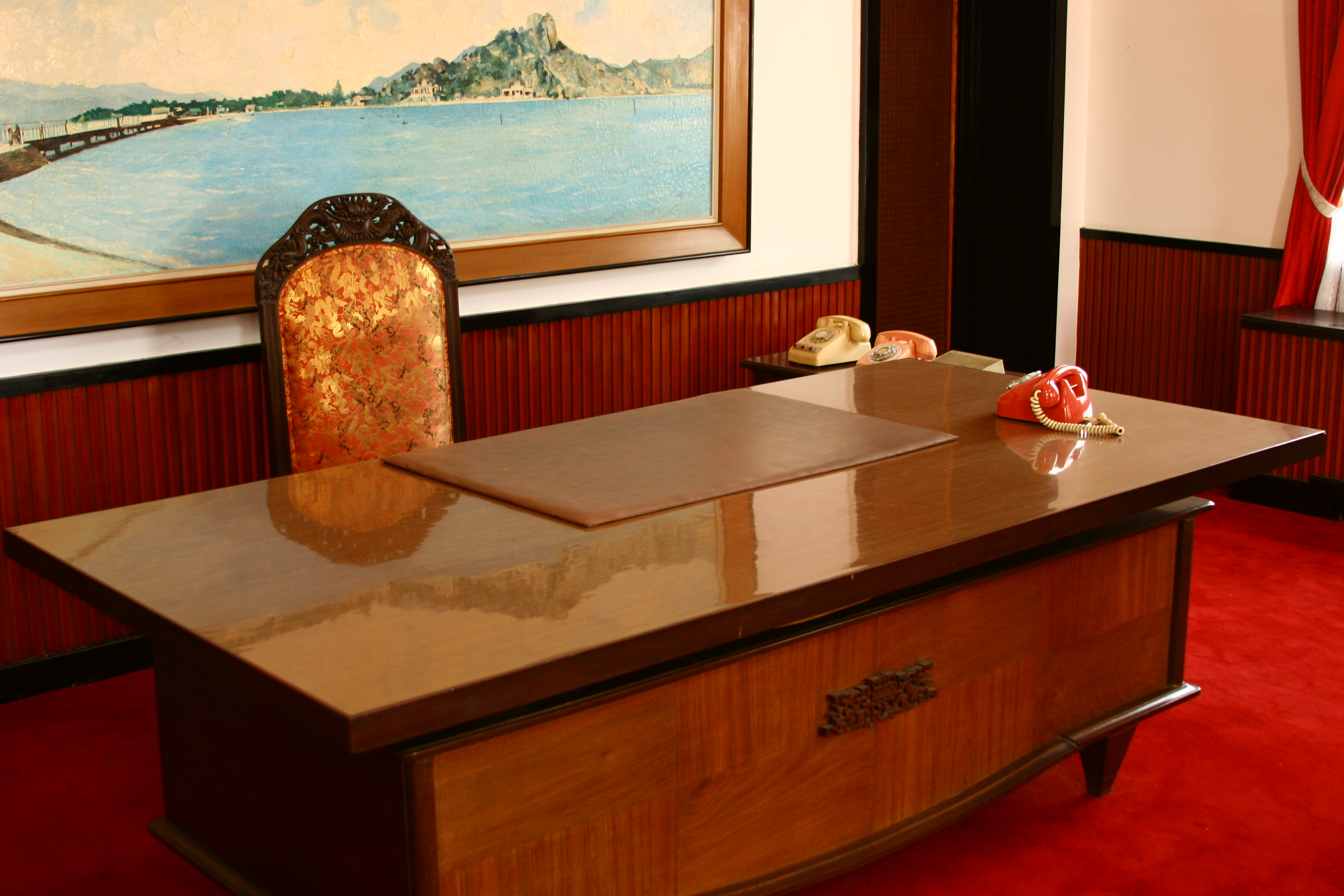
Office of the President of the Republic of Vietnam in Independence Palace, Ho Chi Minh City (formerly Saigon)

This is a list of leaders of South Vietnam, since the establishment of the Autonomous Republic of Cochinchina in 1946, the establishment of the State of Vietnam in 1949, and the division of Vietnam in 1954 until the fall of the Republic of Vietnam in 1975, and the reunification of Vietnam in 1976.

== Legends ==
Colour key
(for political parties)
Cochinchinese Democratic Party
Military (VNA / RVNMF)
Independent
Constitutional Party
Vietnamese Nationalist Party
Nationalist Party
Cần Lao Party
National Social Democratic Front
Democratic Party
Forces for National Reconciliation
National Liberation Front (Việt Cộng)

== Heads of state ==
=== State of Vietnam (1949–1955) ===
Under the State of Vietnam, the position of head of state is known as Chief of the State of Vietnam and was held by Bảo Đại and Ngo Dinh Diem.

No.	Portrait	Name (Birth–Death)	Term of office			Political party	Ref.
No.	Portrait	Name (Birth–Death)	Took office	Left office	Time in office	Political party	Ref.
Chief of State
1		Bảo Đại (1912–1997)	13 June 1949	26 October 1955	6 years, 135 days	Independent	
–		Ngô Đình Diệm (1901–1963) acting	30 April 1955	26 October 1955	179 days	Personalist Labor Revolutionary Party	

=== First Republic of Vietnam (1955–1963) ===
President of the Republic of Vietnam
- Tổng thống Việt Nam Cộng hoà
- Seal of the President (1963–75)

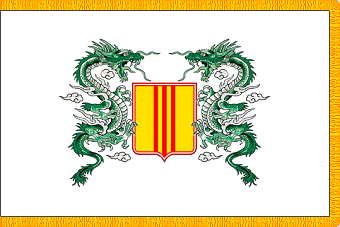
- Presidential Standard (1963-1975)
- Residence: Independence Palace, Saigon
- Appointer: Direct election
- Precursor: Chief of the State of Vietnam
- Formation: 26 October 1956
- First holder: Ngô Đình Diệm
- Final holder: Dương Văn Minh
- Abolished: 30 April 1975
- Succession: Chairman of the Consultative Council of the Provisional Revolutionary Government

No.	Portrait	Name (Birth–Death)	Term of office			Political party	Ref.
No.	Portrait	Name (Birth–Death)	Took office	Left office	Time in office	Political party	Ref.
President
1		Ngô Đình Diệm (1901–1963)	26 October 1955	2 November 1963 X	8 years, 7 days	Personalist Labor Revolutionary Party	

=== Military junta (1963–1967) ===
During the military junta period, the heads of state of South Vietnam did not always hold real power, the heads of military were de facto leaders of the nation. Sometimes the heads of state and heads of military were held by the same person, for example: Duong Van Minh from 2 November 1963 to 30 January 1964 or Nguyen Khanh from 16 August 1964 to 27 August 1964.

No.	Portrait	Name (Birth–Death)	Term of office			Affiliation	Title	Ref.
No.	Portrait	Name (Birth–Death)	Took office	Left office	Time in office	Affiliation	Title	Ref.
1		Dương Văn Minh (1916–2001)	2 November 1963	30 January 1964	89 days	Military	Chief of State and Chairman of Military Revolutionary Council	
1		Dương Văn Minh (1916–2001)	30 January 1964	16 August 1964	199 days	Military	Chief of State	
2		Nguyễn Khánh (1927–2013)	16 August 1964	27 August 1964	11 days	Military	Chief of State and Chairman of Military Revolutionary Council	
*		Provisional Leadership Committee (Minh, Khánh and Khiêm)	27 August 1964	8 September 1964	12 days	Military	Provisional Leadership Committee	
1		Dương Văn Minh (1916–2001)	8 September 1964	26 October 1964	48 days	Military	Chief of State and Chairman of Provisional Leadership Committee	
3		Phan Khắc Sửu (1893–1970)	26 October 1964	20 December 1964	55 days	Vietnamese Democratic Socialist Party	Chief of State and Chairman of High National Council	
3		Phan Khắc Sửu (1893–1970)	20 December 1964	12 June 1965	174 days	Vietnamese Democratic Socialist Party	Chief of State	
4		Nguyễn Văn Thiệu (1923–2001)	19 June 1965	31 October 1967	2 years, 134 days	Military	Chief of State and Chairman of National Leadership Committee	

=== Second Republic of Vietnam (1967–1975) ===
No.	Portrait	Name (Birth–Death)	Term of office			Political party	Ref.
No.	Portrait	Name (Birth–Death)	Took office	Left office	Time in office	Political party	Ref.
President
2		Nguyễn Văn Thiệu (1923–2001)	31 October 1967	21 April 1975	7 years, 172 days	National Social Democratic Front	
3		Trần Văn Hương (1902–1982)	21 April 1975	28 April 1975	7 days	National Social Democratic Front	
4		Dương Văn Minh (1916–2001)	28 April 1975	30 April 1975	2 days	Military	

=== Provisional Revolutionary Government of the Republic of South Vietnam (1969–1976) ===
No.	Portrait	Name (Birth–Death)	Term of office			Political party	Ref.
No.	Portrait	Name (Birth–Death)	Took office	Left office	Time in office	Political party	Ref.
Chairman of the Consultative Council
1		Nguyễn Hữu Thọ (1910–1996)	8 June 1969	2 July 1976	7 years, 24 days	National Liberation Front	

== Deputy heads of state ==
=== First Republic of Vietnam (1955–1963) ===
No.	Portrait	Name (Birth–Death)	Term of office			Political party	Ref.
No.	Portrait	Name (Birth–Death)	Took office	Left office	Time in office	Political party	Ref.
Vice president
1		Nguyễn Ngọc Thơ (1908–1976)	18 December 1956	2 November 1963	6 years, 319 days	Independent	

=== Second Republic of Vietnam (1967–1975) ===
No.	Portrait	Name (Birth–Death)	Term of office			Political party	Ref.
No.	Portrait	Name (Birth–Death)	Took office	Left office	Time in office	Political party	Ref.
Vice president
2		Nguyễn Cao Kỳ (1930–2011)	31 October 1967	29 October 1971	3 years, 363 days	National Social Democratic Front	
3		Trần Văn Hương (1902–1982)	31 October 1971	21 April 1975	3 years, 172 days	National Social Democratic Front	
4		Nguyễn Văn Huyền (1913–1995)	28 April 1975	2 November 1963	2 days	Independent	

== Heads of government ==
Prime Minister of the Republic of Vietnam
- Coat of Arms of the Republic of Vietnam (1967–1975)

- Flag of Vietnam (1948–1975)

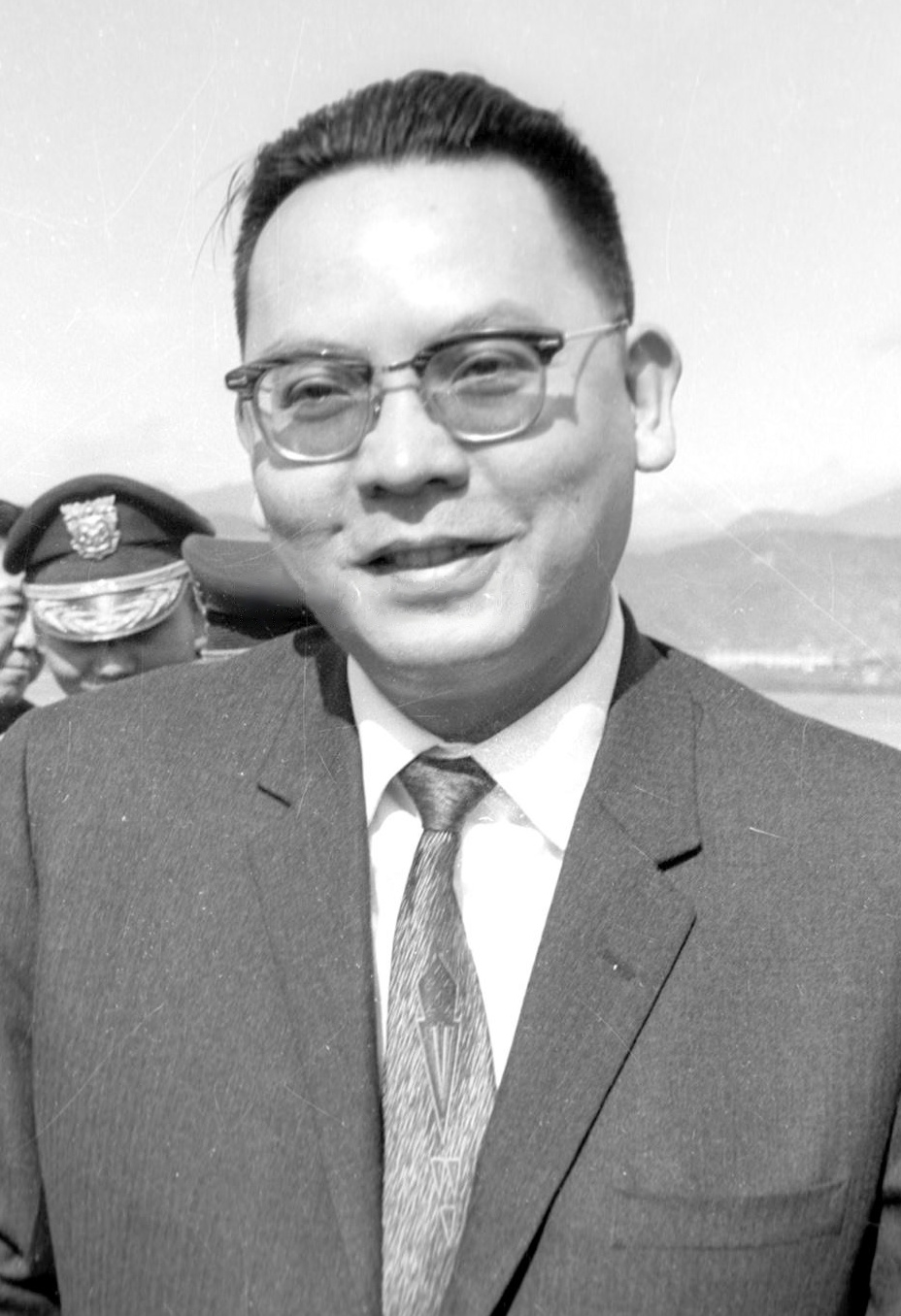
- Longest serving Trần Thiện Khiêm (22 August 1969 – 5 April 1975)
- Government of Cochinchina; Government of the State of Vietnam; Government of South Vietnam
- Status: Abolished
- Residence: Gia Long Palace (1946–55)
- Appointer: Emperor (1949–55); President (1963–75)
- Precursor: Prime Minister of the Empire of Vietnam
- Formation: 1 June 1946; 4 November 1963
- First holder: Nguyễn Văn Thinh
- Final holder: Vũ Văn Mẫu
- Abolished: 26 October 1955; 30 April 1975
- Superseded by: Chairman of the Provisional Revolutionary Government

No.	Portrait	Name (Birth–Death)	Term of office			Political party	Cabinet(s)	Ref.
No.	Portrait	Name (Birth–Death)	Took office	Left office	Time in office	Political party	Cabinet(s)	Ref.
Presidents of the Autonomous Republic of Cochinchina (1946–1948)
1		Nguyễn Văn Thinh (1888–1946)	1 June 1946	10 November 1946	162 days	Cochinchinese Democratic Party		
2		Lê Văn Hoạch (1896–1978)	7 December 1946	8 October 1947	305 days	Independent		
3		Nguyễn Văn Xuân (1892–1989)	8 October 1947	27 May 1948	232 days	Military		
4		Trần Văn Hữu (1896–1984)	27 May 1948	4 June 1949	1 year, 8 days	Independent		
Chief of the government of the Provisional Central Government (1948–1949)
3		Nguyễn Văn Xuân (1892–1989)	27 May 1948	14 June 1949	1 year, 18 days	Military		
Prime Ministers of the State of Vietnam (1949–1955)
1		Bảo Đại (1912–1997)	14 June 1949	20 January 1950	220 days	Independent		
2		Nguyễn Phan Long (1888–1960)	20 January 1950	7 May 1950	107 days	Constitutional Party		
3		Trần Văn Hữu (1896–1984)	7 May 1950	3 June 1952	2 years, 27 days	Independent		
4		Nguyễn Văn Tâm (1893–1990)	25 June 1952	17 December 1953	1 year, 175 days	Nationalist Party		
5		Nguyễn Phúc Bửu Lộc (1914–1990)	17 December 1953	16 June 1954	181 days	Independent		
6		Ngô Đình Diệm (1901–1963)	26 June 1954	26 October 1955	1 year, 122 days	Personalist Labor Revolutionary Party		
Prime Ministers of the Republic of Vietnam (1955–1975)
Abolished (26 October 1955 – 4 November 1963)
1		Nguyễn Ngọc Thơ (1908–1976)	4 November 1963	30 January 1964	87 days	Independent		
2		Nguyễn Khánh (1927–2013)	8 February 1964	29 August 1964	203 days	Military		
—		Nguyễn Xuân Oánh (1921–2003) acting	29 August 1964	3 September 1964	5 days	Independent		
(2)		Nguyễn Khánh (1927–2013)	3 September 1964	26 October 1964	62 days	Military		
—		Phan Khắc Sửu (1893–1970) acting	26 October 1964	3 November 1964	8 days	Vietnamese Democratic Socialist Party		
3		Trần Văn Hương (1902–1982)	4 November 1964	27 January 1965	84 days	Independent		
—		Nguyễn Xuân Oánh (1921–2003) acting	28 January 1965	15 February 1965	18 days	Independent		
4		Phan Huy Quát (1908–1979)	16 February 1965	12 June 1965	116 days	Nationalist Party		
5		Nguyễn Cao Kỳ (1930–2011)	19 June 1965	28 October 1967	2 years, 131 days	Military	Central Executive Committee	
6		Nguyễn Văn Lộc (1922–1992)	31 October 1967	18 May 1968	200 days	Independent		
7		Trần Văn Hương (1902–1982)	25 May 1968	22 August 1969	1 year, 89 days	National Social Democratic Front		
8		Trần Thiện Khiêm (1925–2021)	23 August 1969	4 April 1975	5 years, 224 days	National Social Democratic Front		
9		Nguyễn Bá Cẩn (1930–2009)	4 April 1975	28 April 1975	24 days	National Social Democratic Front		
10		Vũ Văn Mẫu (1914–1998)	28 April 1975	30 April 1975	2 days	Forces for National Reconciliation		
Chairman of government Provisional Revolutionary Government of the Republic of South Vietnam (1969–1976)
1		Huỳnh Tấn Phát (1913–1989)	6 June 1969	2 July 1976	7 years, 26 days	National Liberation Front	Provisional Revolutionary Government	

== Symbols ==
=== Standards ===
Personal standard of Bảo Đại, Chief of State of the State of Vietnam (1949–1955)

Presidential standard of the Republic of Vietnam (1955–1963)

Presidential standard of the Republic of Vietnam (1967–1975)

Flag of the president of the Republic of Vietnam as Supreme Commander of the Armed Forces

=== Document seals ===
Chief of State of Vietnam (1949–1954)

President of the Republic of Vietnam (1955–1957)

President of the Republic of Vietnam (1955–1963)

President of the Republic of Vietnam (1967–1975)

=== Podium seals ===
1967–1975

Seal of President Dương Văn Minh

== See also ==
- List of presidents of Vietnam
- List of heads of state of Vietnam
- List of prime ministers of Vietnam
- List of heads of government of Vietnam
- List of leaders of North Vietnam
