= 1967 in the Vietnam War =

← 1966 1968 →
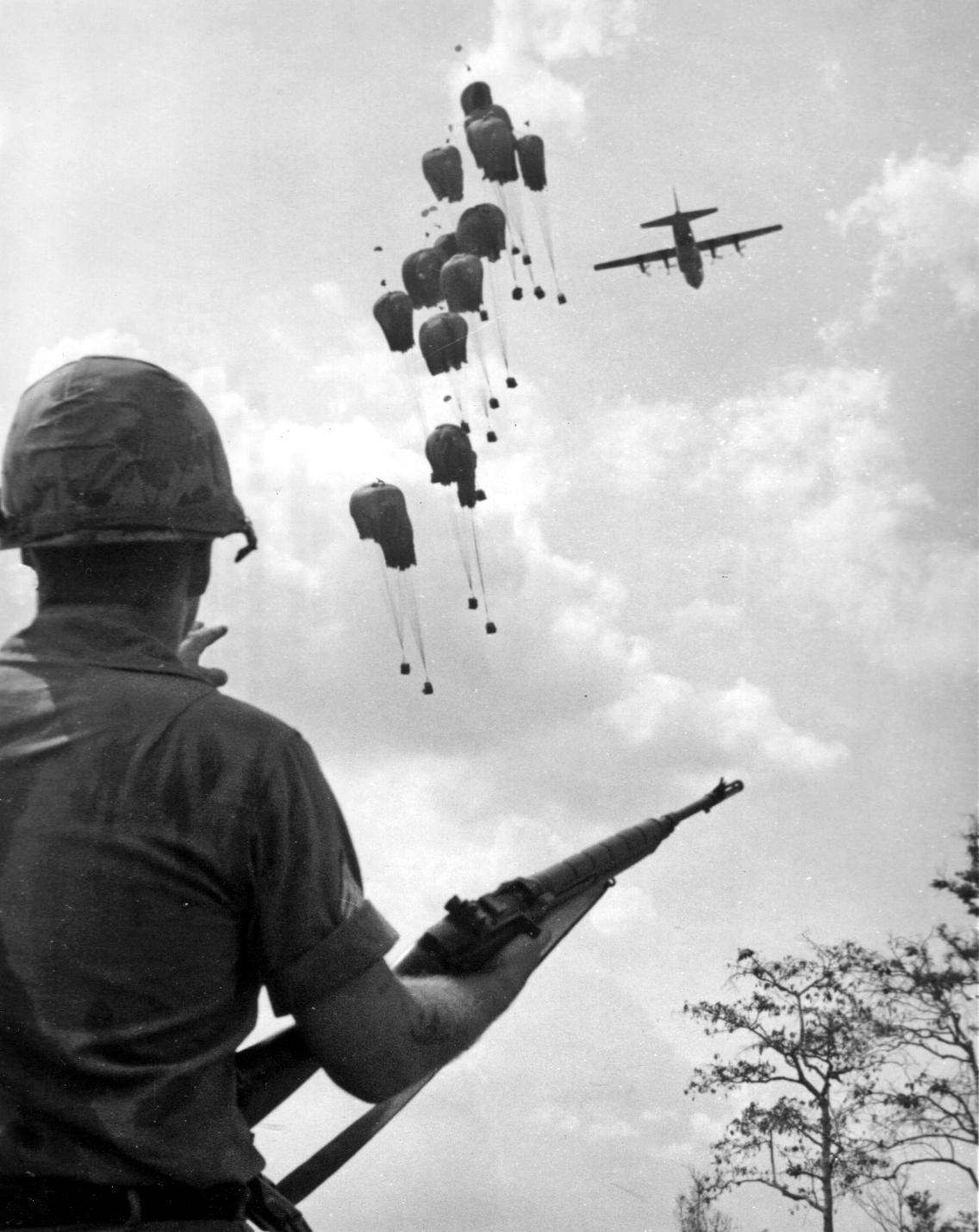
- Air drop of supplies in Operation Junction City
Location	Vietnam

Belligerents
Anti-Communist forces: South Vietnam; United States; South Korea; Australia; Philippines; New Zealand; Thailand; Kingdom of Laos (Taiwan) Republic of China	Communist forces: North Vietnam (Provisional Revolutionary Government of the Republic of South Vietnam) Viet Cong (Laos) Pathet Lao; People's Republic of China; Soviet Union; North Korea

Strength
South Vietnam: 798,800; United States: 485,600; South Korea: 47,830; Thailand: 2,220; Australia: 6,820; Philippines: 2,020 New Zealand: 530	US estimate: 242,000–600,000 (China) 170,000

Casualties and losses
US: 11,363 killed South Vietnam: 12,716 killed Allies: Unknown	US estimate: 140,000 casualties

At the beginning of 1967 the United States was engaged in a steadily expanding air and ground war in Southeast Asia. Since its inception in February 1965, Operation Rolling Thunder, the bombing campaign against North Vietnam, had escalated in the number and significance of its targets, inflicting major damage on transportation networks industry, and petroleum refining and storage facilities. Yet the campaign showed no signs of achieving either of its stated objectives. The air attacks had not broken the Hanoi government's will to continue the war, and they had not halted or appreciably hindered the flow of People's Army of Vietnam (PAVN) troops and supplies into South Vietnam. North Vietnam had been able to repair damage and develop substitutes for destroyed facilities rapidly enough to counter the incremental escalation of the U.S. air campaign. With Soviet and Chinese assistance, the North Vietnamese had built a large and sophisticated air defense system. Its guns and missiles extracted a toll in pilots and aircraft for every American raid. On the ground in South Vietnam, the U.S. force buildup, begun in late 1965, was approaching completion. More than 380,000 American troops were in the country, alongside over 730,000 Army of the Republic of Vietnam (ARVN) soldiers and some 52,000 soldiers from other allied nations. After a year of base building and intensifying combat, the U.S. commander, General William Westmoreland, believed that his forces were ready for major offensives that would seize the battlefield initiative from the PAVN and Viet Cong (VC). The PAVN/VC, however, had been conducting their own buildup, including the infiltration into South Vietnam of regular PAVN divisions. These units, along with VC guerrillas and light infantry formations, were countering the American challenge. Within South Vietnam, the PAVN/VC sought opportunities to inflict American casualties in large and small engagements. They also concentrated troops at various points on South Vietnam's borders to create a strategic threat to the allies and compel the Military Assistance Command, Vietnam, (MACV) to disperse its reserves.

== January ==
2 January

Operation Bolo was a successful combat ruse by the United States Air Force (USAF) that resulted in the USAF shooting down seven Vietnam People's Air Force (VPAF) MiG-21 interceptors.

North Vietnam's Prime Minister Pham Van Dong signaled in an interview with The New York Times correspondent Harrison Salisbury that his nation would begin direct peace talks with the United States if the U.S. maintained an unconditional halt to American bombing, a statement confirmed by President Ho Chi Minh two weeks later.

5-31 January

Operation Maeng Ho VIII was a search and clear operation conducted by the Republic of Korea Army (ROK) Capital Division along Highway 1 in Phú Yên Province. The operation resulted in 150 PAVN/VC killed and 400 captured.

6 January

In the Third Battle of Nakhang Royal Lao Army (RLA) forces with U.S. air support repulsed a PAVN attack on Lima Site 36 at Na Khang. The PAVN lost an estimated 250 killed and the RLA lost nine killed.

6–15 January

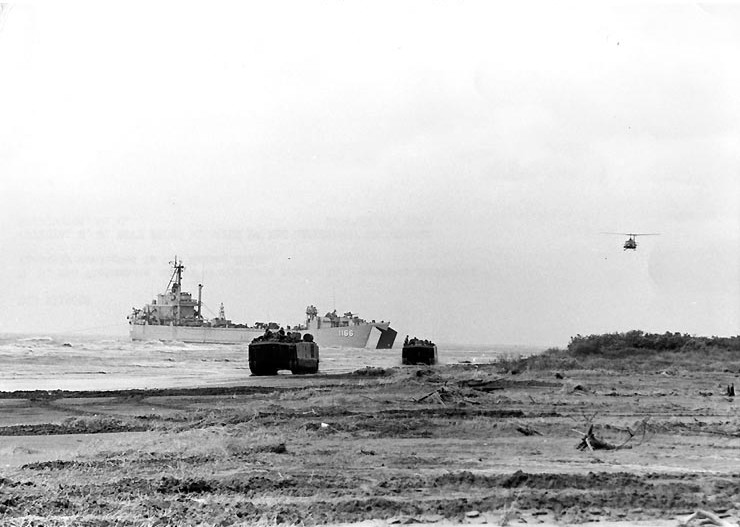
Marine amphibious tractors and a UH-1 helicopter during Operation Deckhouse Five.

Operation Deckhouse Five was conducted by the United States Marine Corps (USMC) and South Vietnamese Marine Corps forces along the Mekong River Delta. The operation was notable in that it was a sizable, combined USMC and Vietnamese Marine amphibious operation and it was the last Special Landing Force (SLF) amphibious landing to take place beyond the boundaries of I Corps. The operation resulted in 21 VC, seven Marines and one ARVN killed.

6 January - 31 May

Operation Palm Beach was conducted by the 3rd Brigade, 9th Infantry Division, 3rd Battalion 39th Infantry and 2nd and 3rd Battalions, 60th Infantry as a search and destroy operation and for the establishment of Đồng Tâm Base Camp. It resulted in 570 VC and 149 U.S. killed.

8–28 January

Operation Cedar Falls was a military operation conducted primarily by U.S. forces. The aim of this massive search and destroy operation was to eradicate the so-called "Iron Triangle", an area located in close proximity to Saigon, which had become a major VC stronghold. The operation resulted in 720 PAVN/VC killed and 218 captured, U.S. losses were 72 killed and ARVN losses were 11 killed.

9 January

In the Raid on Ban Naden a Central Intelligence Agency (CIA)-led team raided a Pathet Lao prisoner of war camp in Ban Naden in northern Laos. The operation successfully freed 82 prisoners.

The VC sank the dredgeship Jamaica Bay which was dredging for the construction of Đồng Tâm Base Camp, three crewmembers were killed.

10 January

President Johnson delivered the annual State of the Union address to Congress, and told the gathered legislators "I recommend to the Congress a surcharge of 6 percent on both corporate and individual income taxes--to last for 2 years or for so long as the unusual expenditures associated with our efforts in Vietnam continue." Regarding the war, Johnson said "I wish I could report to you that the conflict is almost over. This I cannot do. We face more cost, more loss, and more agony," and he delivered a record 135-billion dollar federal government budget proposal.

14 January

A Civilian Irregular Defense Group (CIDG) company engaged a PAVN force near Bù Đốp Camp killing 41 PAVN for the loss of three killed.

21 January to February 7

Operation Ma Doo I was conducted by the ROK 28th Regiment, 9th Infantry Division in Phú Yên Province. The operation resulted in 160 PAVN/VC killed.

24-8 January

Operation Tuscaloosa was a search and destroy operation conducted by the 2nd Battalion, 5th Marines in 24 km southwest of Da Nang. The operation resulted in 72 PAVN/VC killed.

25 January

Lieutenant General Nguyễn Hữu Có was dismissed from his positions as Deputy Premier and Defense Minister of South Vietnam and removed from his place in the military junta governing the nation, by vote of the other junta members.

26 January to 23 March

Operation Farragut was a 1st Brigade, 101st Airborne Division search and destroy operation in Bình Thuận, Ninh Thuận and Lâm Đồng Provinces. The operation resulted in 115 PAVN/VC and 15 U.S. killed.

27 January – 7 April

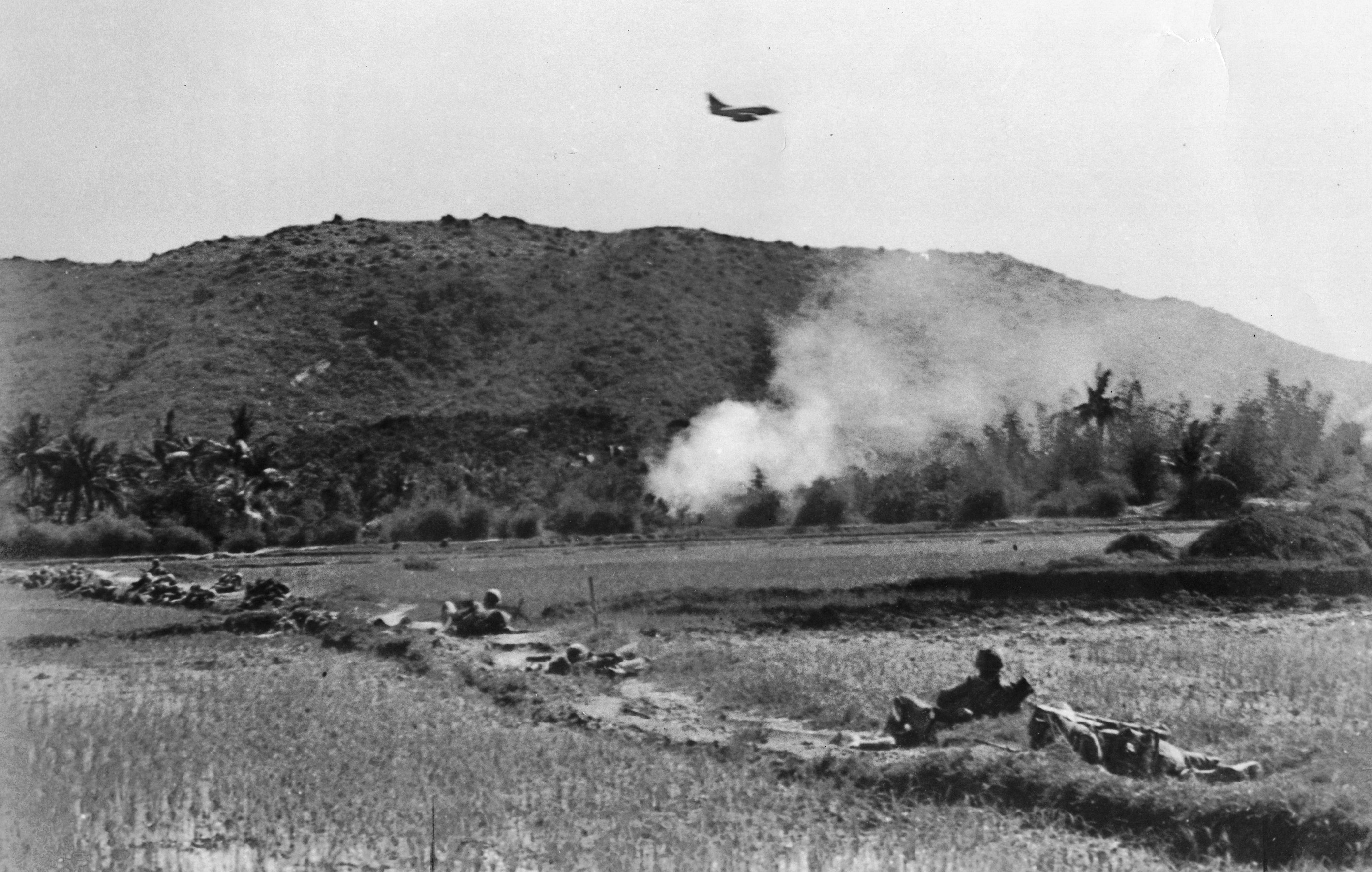
A Marine A-4 bombs VC positions during Operation Desoto

Operation Desoto conducted by the 3rd Battalion, 7th Marines in Đức Phổ District. The operation results in 383 VC and 76 U.S. killed.

28/9 January

U.S. helicopter gunships kill 31 South Vietnamese civilians crossing the Bassac River on sampans after curfew.

29-31 January

Operation Baek Ma I was an ROK 9th Division search-and-destroy operation in Khánh Hòa Province. The operation resulted in 390 PAVN/VC killed.

== February ==
1 February

U.S. Marine attack aircraft and artillery accidentally fire on a village 12 miles (19 km) southwest of Da Nang killing eight civilians.

1 February – 18 March

Operation Prairie II was conducted by the 3rd Marine Division to eliminate PAVN forces south of the Demilitarized Zone (DMZ). The operation resulted in 694 PAVN killed and 20 captured and 93 Marines killed.

2–21 February

Operation Gadsden was an operation conducted by the 196th Infantry Brigade and the 3rd Brigade, 4th Infantry Division against the PAVN 271st Regiment in Tây Ninh Province. The operation resulted in 160 PAVN and 29 U.S. killed.

4 February

The VC attacked the Long Binh Post ammunition supply point, destroying at least 15,000 high explosive 155 mm artillery projectiles.

8 February

Johnson sent a letter to Ho Chi Minh, by way of Moscow, that began "Dear Mr. President: I am writing to you in the hope that the conflict in Viet Nam can be brought to an end," and outlining his proposal that "I am prepared to order a cessation of bombing against your country... as soon as I am assured that infiltration into South Viet Nam by land and by sea has stopped." Ho would receive the message on February 10 and prepare a response.

12 February – 5 April

Operation Sam Houston was conducted by the 4th Infantry Division in the Plei Trap Valley and Plei Doc. The operation resulted in 733 PAVN and 155 U.S. killed.

12 February – 19 January 1968

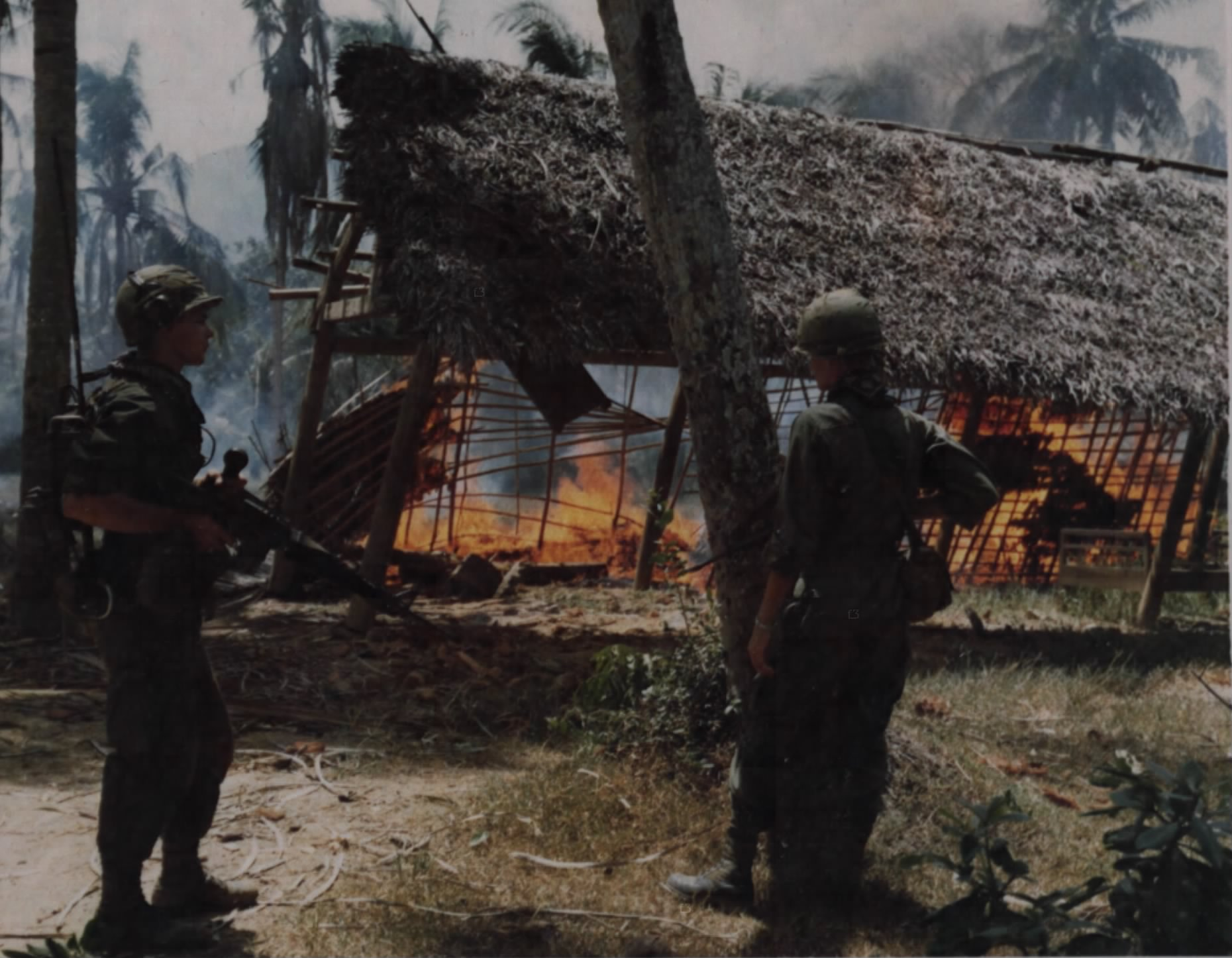
1st Cavalry Division troops burn a VC hut during Operation Pershing

Operation Pershing was conducted by the 1st Cavalry Division, the 3rd Brigade, 25th Infantry Division, the ARVN 22nd Division and the ROK Capital Division in Bình Định Province against the PAVN 3rd Division. The operation resulted in 5,401 PAVN killed, 852 U.S. killed and 22 missing and 30+ ARVN killed.

13 February – 11 March 1968

Operation Enterprise a pacification and security operation was conducted by the 3rd Brigade, 9th Infantry Division and Regional Forces and Popular Forces in Long An Province. The operation results in 241 PAVN/VC killed, 21 captured and 80 defectors. U.S. losses were 31 killed.

14 February

The Battle of Tra Binh Dong was probably the most famous battle fought by the Republic of Korea Marine Corps 2nd Marine Brigade. It was fought in the Tra Binh Dong village near the border of Cambodia. The battle resulted in 246 PAVN/VC killed and two captured and 15 Koreans killed.

15 February

McNamara claims that the bombing of North Vietnam is achieving its objectives with supplies to the Southern insurgency levelling off as 300,000 North Vietnamese are needed to repair and maintain supply lines.

16 February

Thirteen U.S. helicopters are shot down throughout South Vietnam in the highest daily loss to date, including nine in an operation in the Mekong Delta, four U.S. crewmen are killed.

17–18 February

6 RAR troops are picked up during Operation Bribie

Operation Bribie, or the Battle of Ap My An, was fought in Phước Tuy Province between the 6th Battalion, Royal Australian Regiment and the VC, reinforced by PAVN regulars.

17-22 February

Operation Lien Ket 81 was conducted by the ARVN 4th Regiment, 2nd Division, 4th Armored Cavalry Squadron, 21st and 37th Ranger Battalions and 1st, 7th and 8th Airborne Battalions against the PAVN 40th Battalion and 21st Regiment in Quảng Ngãi Province. The operation resulted in 813 PAVN killed.

19 February - 14 May

Operation Ala Moana, a U.S. 25th Infantry Division search and destroy operation killed 382 PAVN/VC for the loss of 38 U.S. killed.

20 February

The 1st Company of the Third Nung Battalion (Airborne), III Corps' MIKE Force, operating from Bù Đốp Camp engaged a battalion of the PAVN 12th Regiment killing 40 PAVN for the loss of two ARVN.

21 February

Bernard B. Fall died after stepping on a landmine while observing the Marines' Operation Chinook II on the Street Without Joy in Quảng Trị Province.

22 February – 14 May

Operation Junction City was an 82-day military operation conducted by U.S. and ARVN. It was the largest U.S. airborne operation since Operation Market Garden during World War II, the only major airborne operation of the Vietnam War and one of the largest U.S. operations of the Vietnam War. The operation resulted in 2,728 PAVN/VC and 282 U.S. killed.

27 February

The PAVN launched a rocket attack on Da Nang Air Base hitting the base with more than 50 140mm rockets in one minute.

28 February

The CIA arranged the release of Pham Thi Yen, the wife of VC Central Committee member Trần Bửu Kiếm, from South Vietnamese custody in order to deliver a message to her husband requesting the establishment of covert contacts.

== March ==
2 March

Two USAF F-4 Phantoms accidentally bombed Lang Vei in northwest Quảng Trị Province killing at least 100 villagers.

Robert F. Kennedy outlined a three-point plan to end the war which included suspending the U.S. bombing of North Vietnam, and the eventual withdrawal of American and North Vietnamese soldiers from South Vietnam; this plan was rejected by Secretary of State Dean Rusk, who believed North Vietnam would never agree to it.

4 March

Two badly wounded prisoners survived after VC prison guards near Cần Thơ tied 12 South Vietnamese captives together, shot and stabbed them before fleeing from advancing ARVN troops; both survivors lived despite having their throats cut.

5 March

In a night raid, the VC killed two young CORDS workers in Vinh Phu, Phú Yên Province. Seven additional CORDS team members were killed in the ensuing gunfight and four were wounded.

8 March

McNamara ordered the start of construction of the Strongpoint Obstacle System along the DMZ under the code-name Project Dye-Marker, otherwise known as the McNamara Line.

8 March to 18 April

Operation Oh Jak Kyo I was conducted by the ROK Capital and 9th Divisions to link up their tactical areas of responsibility in Phú Yên Province. the operation resulted in 831 PAVN/VC and 23 ROK killed.

10 March

A U.S. Navy VC-47J crashed near Phan Rang Air Base killing all 25 on board.

18 March

The South Vietnamese assembly adopted a new constitution providing for a civilian government with a president, vice-president and bicameral legislature.

19 March – 19 April

Operation Prairie III was a continuation of Operation Prairie II with essentially the same forces in the same operational area. The operation resulted in 252 PAVN killed and four captured and 56 Marines killed.

20-21 March

Johnson, McNamara and Rusk met with Chief of State Nguyễn Văn Thiệu and Prime Minister Nguyễn Cao Kỳ on Guam for strategy discussions.

20 March - 1 April

In Operation Beacon Hill north of Cửa Việt Base, Battalion Landing Team 1st Battalion, 4th Marines killed 334 PAVN for the loss of 29 Marines killed.

23-4 March

Two CIDG companies engaged a PAVN company 10 km east of Bù Đốp Camp killing 20 with an estimated 40 killed by airstrikes. On 24 March a CIDG company and a MIKE Force company conducted a heliborne assault on the same area and shortly thereafter became heavily engaged with two PAVN battalions. Three CIDG were killed and 13 CIDG/MIKE missing while PAVN losses were 98 killed and a further 170 estimated killed by air strikes.

30 March

VC recoilless rifle fire directed at the homes of families of ARVN troops demolished 200 houses and killed 32 men, women and children in the capital city of Bac Lieu Province.

== April ==
Military Assistance Command, Vietnam – Studies and Observations Group commenced Operation Daniel Boone, a cross-border reconnaissance effort in Cambodia.

2 April

Village elections were held in a total of 984 villages in South Vietnam with over five million voters.

4 April

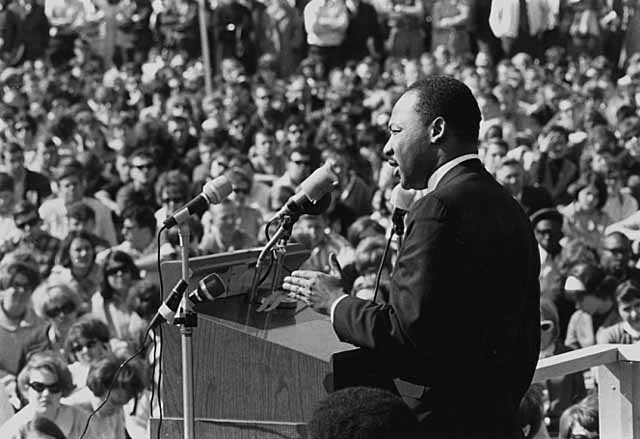
Martin Luther King Jr. speaking at an anti-war rally

In a speech titled Beyond Vietnam: A Time to Break Silence, his strongest antiwar declaration up to that time, Martin Luther King Jr. denounced U.S. involvement in Vietnam in a gathering at the Riverside Church in New York City.

6 April

A reinforced PAVN regiment briefly overran Quảng Trị, freeing 200 PAVN/VC prisoners from a prison before withdrawing from the city. 125 ARVN and four Marines were killed in the attack.

6 April – 11 October

Operation Francis Marion was conducted by the 4th Infantry Division, 173rd Airborne Brigade, ARVN 23rd Division and the 42nd Regiment, 22nd Division in Pleiku, Darlac and the Kon Tum Provinces. The operation resulted in 1,530 PAVN, 300 U.S. and 100 ARVN killed.

7–22 April

Operation Lejeune was conducted by the 2nd Brigade, 1st Cavalry Division in Đức Phổ District. The operation resulted in 176 VC killed and 127 captured.

11 April

Thailand allowed U.S. B-52 bombers to begin flying bombing missions over Vietnam from Thai bases, with the first mission flown from U-Tapao Royal Thai Navy Airfield.

13 April

A South Vietnamese entertainment troupe was the target of night raid in Lu Song hamlet, near Da Nang. The team chief and his deputy were killed; two team members were wounded.

15 April

A group of 20 U.S. servicemen marched at the forefront of a parade from New York's Central Park to the United Nations Plaza, behind a banner "Vietnam Veterans Against the War" as part of at least 100,000 protesters in a demonstration organized by the Spring Mobilization Committee to End the War in Vietnam, marking a new development in which American vets would join the anti-war movement. Six of the veterans would form an organization of the same name after the march. What was described as "the largest peace demonstration in decades" in Manhattan lasted for four hours.

Forty-one ARVN soldiers were killed and 50 seriously wounded in the Binh Dinh Province when two USAF F-100 jets accidentally bombed them.

18 April

Westmoreland advised the JCS that he required a further 201,250 troops for a total U.S. troop strength of 671,616 to contain the threat from the PAVN and maintain tactical initiative.

Sui Chon hamlet northeast of Saigon was attacked by VC who killed CORDS team members, wounded three and abducted seven; three of those killed were young girls, whose hands were tied behind their backs before they were shot in the head. One third of the hamlet's dwellings are destroyed by fire.

19 April

No. 2 Squadron RAAF equipped with eight Canberra bombers arrived at Phan Rang Air Base. They would conduct bombing missions over South Vietnam, Laos and Cambodia until June 1971.

20 April – 17 May

Operation Prairie IV was conducted by the 3rd Marine Division in the area around Con Thien known as Leatherneck Square.

20 April - September 1967

Task Force Oregon was formed from three separate U.S. infantry brigades and an armored cavalry regiment. In September the Task Force was redesignated as the 23rd Infantry Division (Americal).

21 April – 16 May

Operation Union was a search and destroy mission in the Que Son Valley carried out by the 1st Marine Regiment to engage the PAVN 2nd Division. The operation resulted in 865 PAVN killed and 110 Marines killed and two missing.

22 April – 31 July

Operation Baker was a security operation conducted by the U.S. 3rd Brigade, 25th Infantry Division in the Đức Phổ District. The operation resulted in 1,339 PAVN/VC and 97 U.S. killed.

23 April – 7 June

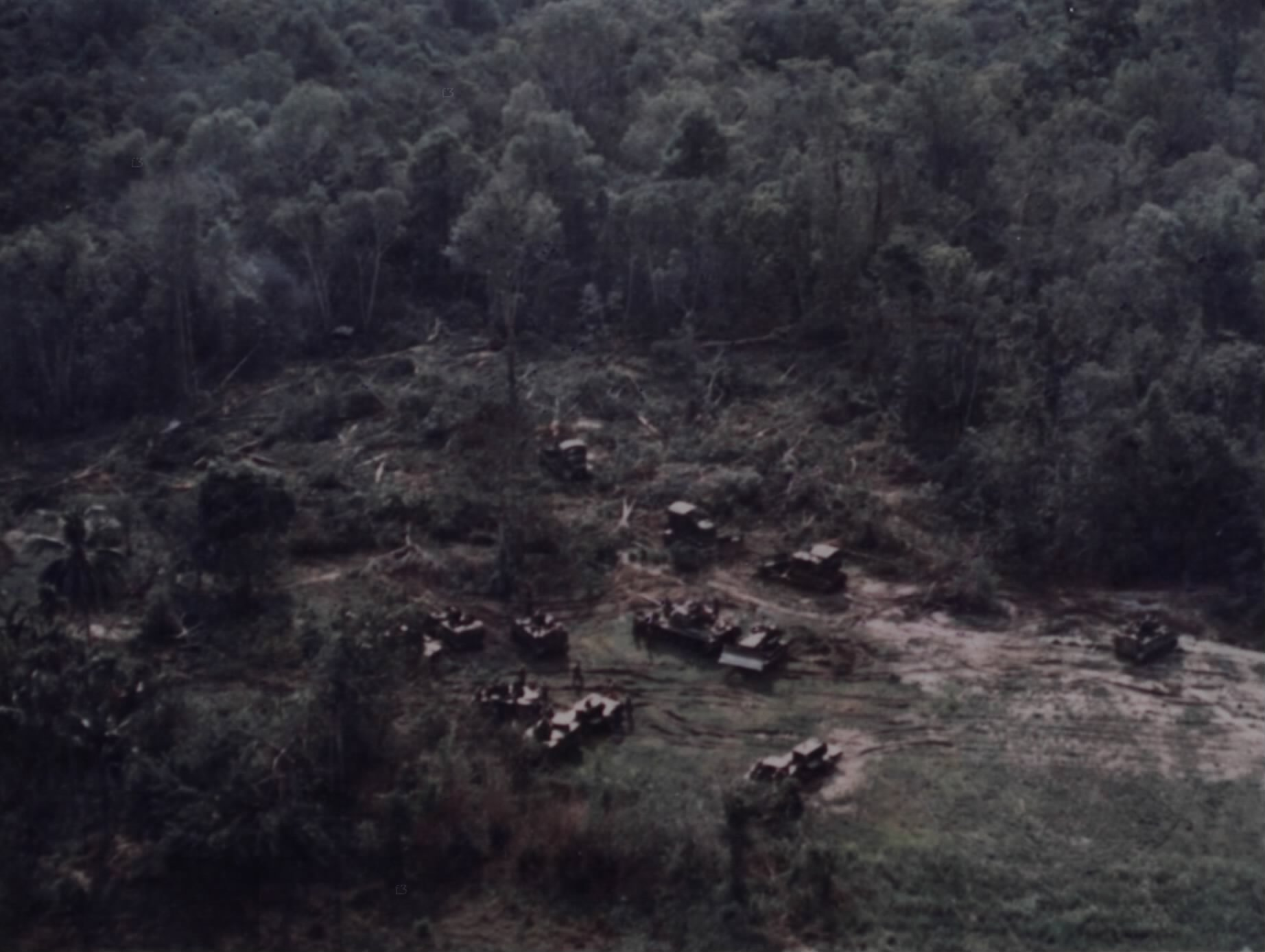
Jungle clearing during Operation Manhattan

Operation Manhattan was conducted by the 1st and 2nd Brigades, 25th Infantry Division and the 3rd Brigade, 4th Infantry Division in the Ho Bo Woods/Bến Củi area. The operation resulted in 74 VC killed.

24 April

Under Secretary of State Nicholas Katzenbach ordered a review of whether to grant Westmoreland's request for a further 2101,250 troops and potentially expand the war into North Vietnam, Laos and Cambodia or to limit troop increases to a level that would not require mobilizing the reserves and limiting bombing of North Vietnam to the area below the 20th parallel north.

24 April – 11 May

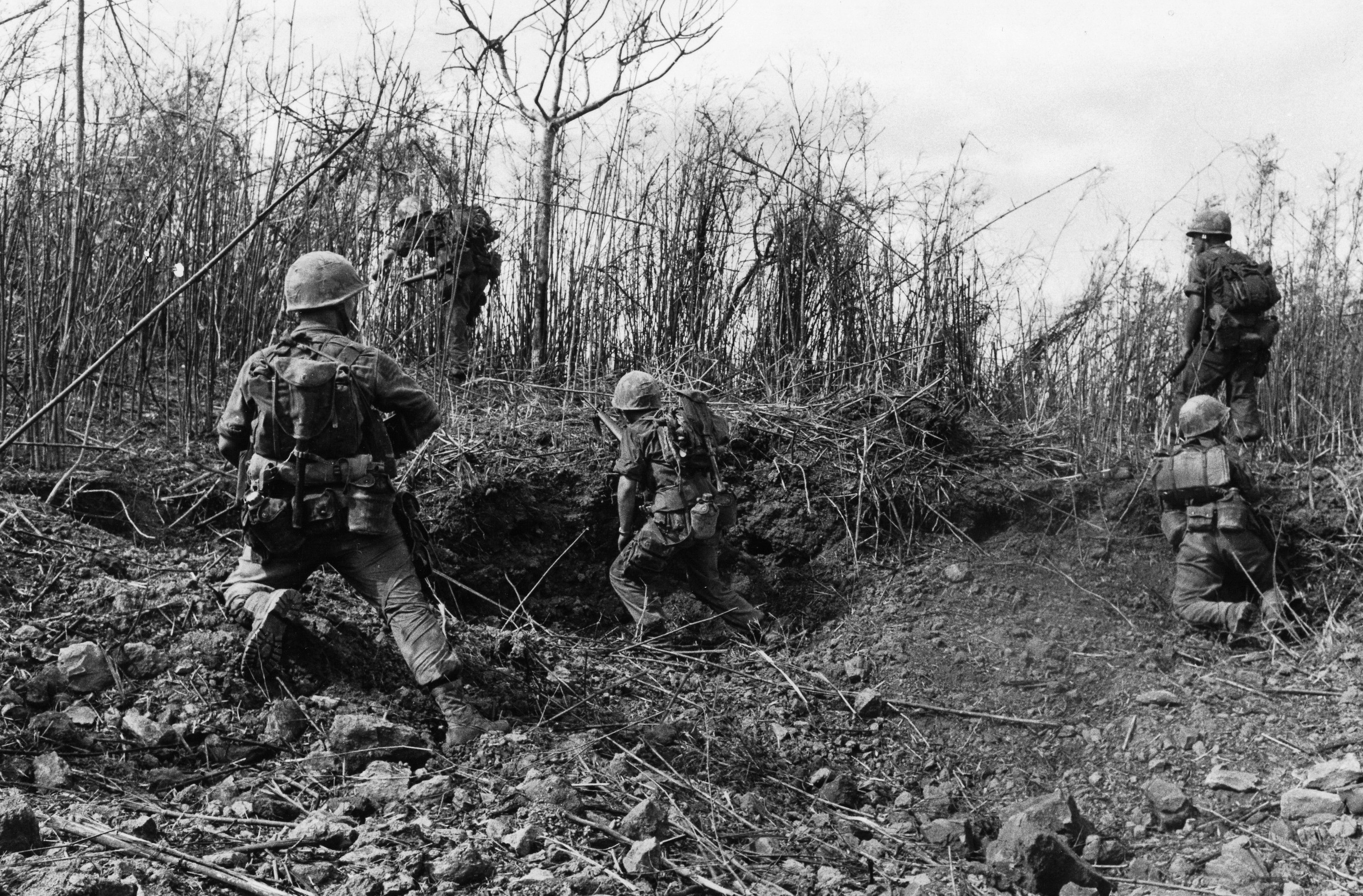
Company G, 2/3 Marines assault Hill 881N in The Hill Fights

The Hill Fights was a battle between the PAVN and U.S. Marines on Hills 881 North, 881 South and 861 north of Khe Sanh Combat Base. The operation resulted in 940 PAVN and 155 Marines killed.

27 April

Westmoreland and Chairman of the JCS General Earle Wheeler met with Johnson to urge him to provide extra troops for the war and to mobilize the reserves to meet this requirement, Johnson defers making any decision.

28 April

Westmoreland addressed a joint session of the United States Congress.

World heavyweight boxing champion Muhammad Ali refused to take the oath of induction into the U.S. Army after reporting as scheduled to an induction center in Houston, Texas. Ali was stripped of his boxing title on the same day by the World Boxing Association, and would not be allowed to fight for the title again until 1970. On 20 June Ali would be convicted of draft evasion, fined $10,000 and sentenced to five years in prison, but the conviction would be overturned by the U.S. Supreme Court on 28 June.

28 April – 12 May

Operation Beaver Cage was conducted by the 1st Battalion, 3rd Marines against VC bases in the Que Son Valley. The operation resulted in 181 VC killed and 66 captured and 55 Marines killed.

== May ==
2 May

The Republican Party was revealed to be deeply divided in its views in the war and whether or not it should support the Johnson Administration in the lead up to the 1968 Presidential election. A survey of Republicans had asked are "Democratic mistakes are Republican responsibilities?" and if politics should stop at the water's edge on the issue of U.S. involvement in a land war in Asia.

3 May - 19 October

The House Committee on Armed Services established a subcommittee to review the development, history, distribution and adequacy of the M16 rifle after complaints about its reliability in combat, particularly during the Hill Fights. The subcommittee's report found that a change in propellant powder and deficiencies in cleaning were the major causes of problems with the weapon and improved cleaning procedures and the introduction of a chrome-plated chamber on the M16A1 overcame most of the reliability complaints.

4 May

The PAVN attacked Lang Vei Special Forces Camp killing the Special Forces commander and executive officer and 20 CIDG soldiers, while a further 39 went missing; PAVN losses were seven killed.

5 May

Assistant Secretary of Defense for International Security Affairs John McNaughton recommended to McNamara that bombing be restricted to below the 20th parallel to reduce aircraft losses over Hanoi and Haiphong.

7 May

A VC attack on Binh Thuy Air Base destroyed four RVNAF A-1H Skyraiders and two UH-34s.

8 May

Walt Rostow recommended to Johnson that bombing should be reduced to infiltration routes in southern North Vietnam.

9 May

Civil Operations and Revolutionary Development Support (CORDS) a U.S. and South Vietnamese pacification program was established under the control of Robert Komer.

11 May – 1 July

Operation Malheur I and Operation Malheur II were a series of military actions conducted by the 1st Brigade, 101st Airborne Division subduing increased activity by VC forces in Quảng Ngãi Province. The operation resulted in 869 PAVN/VC and 81 U.S. killed.

13 May

USAF jets shot down seven MiG-17s.

13 May - 16 July

Operation Crockett was conducted by the 26th Marine Regiment around Khe Sanh Combat Base. The operation resulted in 111 PAVN and 34 Marines killed.

14 May – 7 December

Operation Kole Kole was a search and destroy operation conducted by the 2nd Brigade, 25th Infantry Division in Hậu Nghĩa and Tây Ninh Provinces to engage VC units and interdict infiltration routes. The operation resulted in 797 VC killed and 159 captured and 34 Chieu Hoi and 158 U.S. killed.

16 May

In two separate attacks in Quảng Tin and Quảng Trị Provinces, the VC killed eight CORDS team members and injured five.

17-25 May

Operation Thunder Dragon was a search and destroy operation conducted by the ROK 2nd Marine Brigade in Quảng Ngãi Province. the operation resulted in 147 PAVN/VC and 14 ROK killed.

18 May

More than 150 140mm rockets hit Dong Ha Combat Base killing 11 Marines and wounding 91.

18–28 May

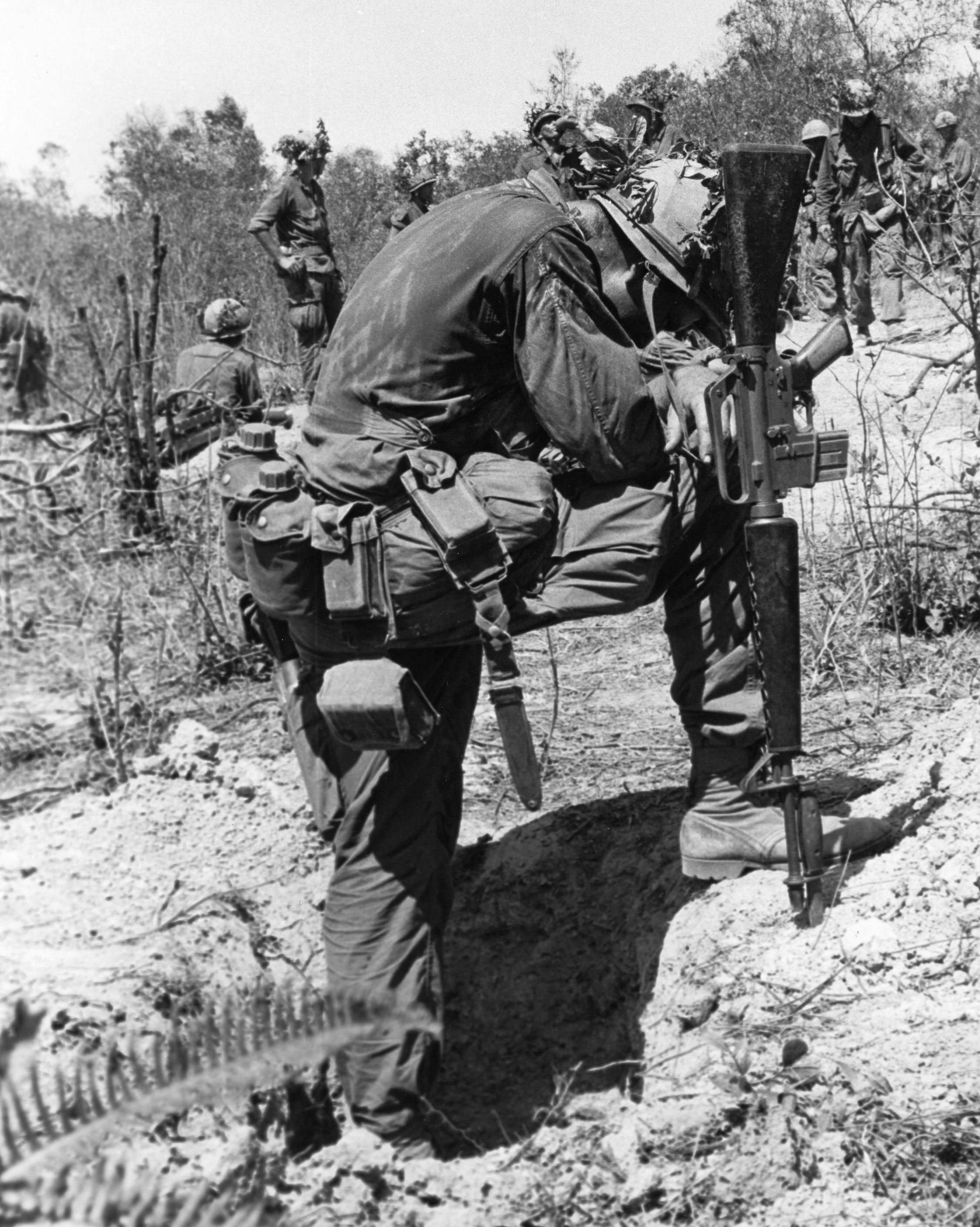
A 9th Regiment Marine mourns the loss of a friend during Operation Hickory

Operation Hickory was a search and destroy operation conducted by the 3rd Marine Division in Leatherneck Square. The operation resulted in 362 PAVN and 142 Marines killed and the removal of the entire civilian population and creation of a free-fire zone.

18 May – 7 December

Operation Barking Sands was a pacification operation conducted by the 1st Brigade, 25th Infantry Division in Hậu Nghĩa and Bình Dương Provinces. The operation resulted in 304 VC and 152 U.S. killed.

19 May

In a memo to Johnson, McNamara argued against increasing troop numbers in South Vietnam, that bombing should be reduced, the Domino Theory was redundant since Suharto's takeover in Indonesia and the war was unwinnable as the dysfunctional South Vietnamese state would never be able to win the war, meaning the Americans would have to stay in Vietnam for decades to come.

U.S. Navy F-8 Crusader jets shot down four MiG-17s.

20 May

USAF jets shot down six MiG-17s and MiG-21s.

21 May

The Court-martial of Howard Levy began at Fort Jackson, South Carolina. Levy, an Army doctor, refused orders to train Green Beret medics on their way to South Vietnam. Levy was convicted and sentenced to three years at Fort Leavenworth.

24 May

In response to a 20 May request from McNamara for alternatives to continued bombing, the JCS issued memoranda supporting Westmoreland's earlier request for 201,250 troops and calling for the mining of Haiphong harbor and bombing of transport routes from China.

The information officer of Phu Thanh, Bien Hoa Province, and his two children were killed by grenades thrown into their home.

25 May – 5 June

Operation Union II was a search and destroy mission in the Que Son Valley carried out by the 5th Marine Regiment. The operation resulted in 594 PAVN killed and 23 captured and 110 Marines killed.

26 May

Time magazine published a cover story The Negro in Vietnam profiling African-American participation in the war which claimed that the ratio of African-American to white combat troops was double that for the U.S. population as a whole, their combat death rate was therefore higher and there were disproportionately fewer African-American officers.

26 May – 27 January 1968

Operation Dragnet was a security operation conducted by the 1st Cavalry Division in Bình Định Province. The operation resulted in 223 VC and 12 U.S. killed.

29 May

VC frogmen emerged from the Perfume River in Huế to blow up a hotel housing members of the International Control Commission. Five South Vietnamese civilians were killed and 15 wounded and the hotel was 80 percent destroyed.

31 May

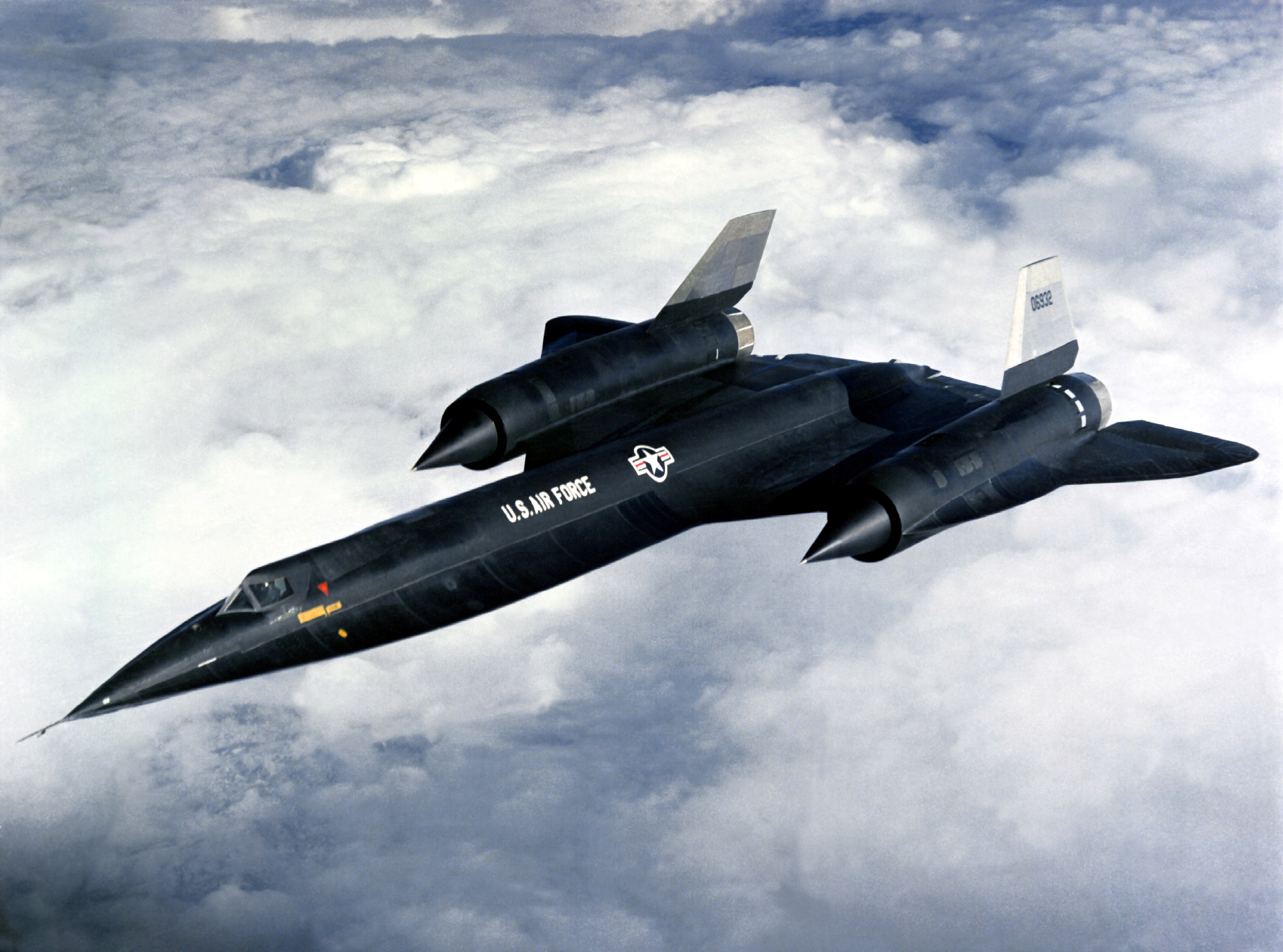
Lockheed A-12

The first USAF Black Shield reconnaissance survey of surface-to-air missile (SAM) sites in North Vietnam by Lockheed A-12 jets took place. The flight took off from Kadena Air Base at Okinawa, refueled then flew over Haiphong, Hanoi and Dien Bien Phu, refueled again over Thailand, then flew over the area above the DMZ, photographing 70 of the 190 known SAM bases.

The JCS rejected McNamara's 19 May memo to Johnson saying that the proposed changes to U.S. policy would undermine U.S. involvement in South Vietnam and credibility with U.S. allies.

== June ==
1 June to 26 July

Operation Coronado was conducted by the Mobile Riverine Force in Cần Giuộc District. The operation resulted in 50 U.S. and approximately 170 VC killed.

2 June

USAF F-105 jets attacked the North Vietnamese port of Cam Pha and cannon fire struck a Soviet ship, the Turkestan, as it sat in harbor. Nikolai Rybachuk, a Soviet merchant sailor was killed and six others were injured. The United States initially denied that it had struck the Turkestan, but conceded 16 days later that the Soviet ship had been strafed by cannon fire from F-105 jets.

2-3 June

A MACV-SOG Hatchet Force attacked the PAVN's Oscar Eight base in eastern Laos. The SOG force withdrew with 6 U.S. and more than 40 Nùng dead and missing and two aircraft and four helicopters shot down.

4 June

The Washington Post published an article by Ward Just titled "This war may be unwinnable" stating "This war is not being won, and by any reasonable estimate, it is not going to be won in the foreseeable future... It may be unwinnable."

9–29 June

Operation Akron was conducted by the 1st Brigade, 9th Infantry Division, the 1st & 3rd Squadrons, 11th Armored Cavalry Regiment and the ARVN 18th Division in Hát Dịch. The operation resulted in 412 PAVN, 9 U.S. and 51 ARVN killed.

10 June

Two PAVN mortar attacks on Pleiku kill 27 people, most of them Montagnards attending a CORDS pacification school.

12–16 June

Operation Billings was a search and destroy operation conducted by the U.S. 3rd Brigade, 1st Infantry Division north of Phước Vĩnh. The operation resulted in 347 VC killed and one captured and 57 U.S. killed.

14 June

The VC attacked two hamlets in Châu Đốc Province in the Mekong Delta, killing 19 civilians and wounding 41. The ARVN killed 202 VC and captured 19 in the Mekong Delta.

17 June

McNamara commissioned the Vietnam Study Task Force, its final report would later become known as the Pentagon Papers.

A USAF C-130B crashed on takeoff from Camp Radcliff killing 35 on board.

18 June - 2 July

Operation Beacon Torch/Calhoun was conducted by the BLT 2nd Battalion, 3rd Marines southeast of Hội An. The operation resulted in 86 PAVN/VC killed and 13 Marines killed.

19–21 June

Operation Concordia was an operation conducted by the U.S. Mobile Riverine Force (MRF) in conjunction with ARVN forces. The operation resulted in 255 VC and 46 U.S. killed.

20–22 June

The Battle of the Slopes was fought between the 503rd Infantry Regiment and PAVN units on Hill 1388, near Đắk Tô Base Camp in Kon Tum Province. The operation resulted in 79 U.S. and 106–475 PAVN estimated killed.

23-25 June

Johnson and Kosygin discussed the war at the Glassboro Summit Conference.

24 June

A VC mortar attack on Camp Rainier disabled 29 UH-1 helicopters of the 188th Assault Helicopter Company.

27 June

Twenty-three civilians were killed when their bus struck a VC mine in Binh Duong Province, southeast of Lai Khê.

30 June

The Armed Forces Council decided that Thiệu would be the candidate for president, while Kỳ would run as vice-president in the upcoming presidential election.

30 June - February 1968

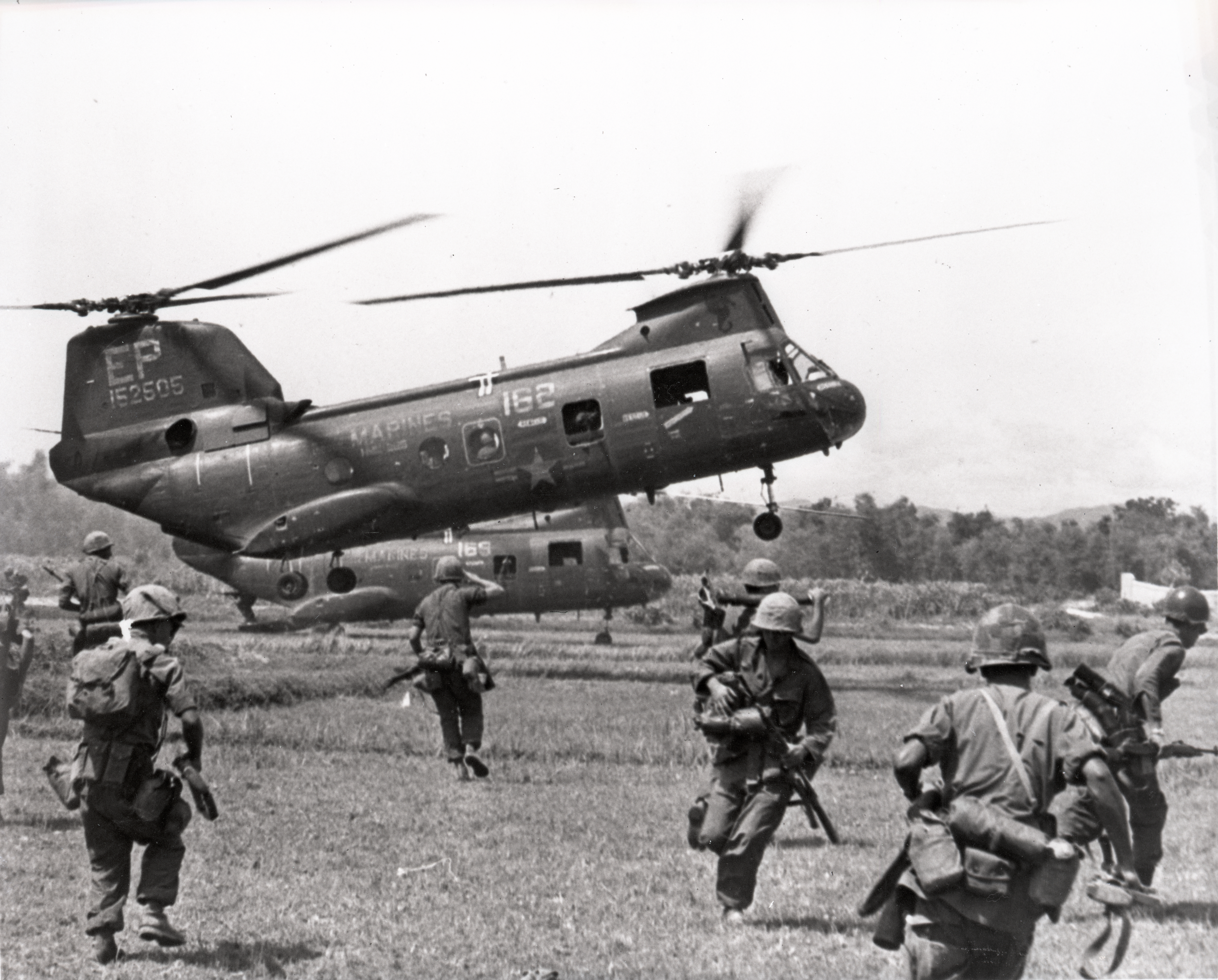
CH-46As of HMM-265

After several accidents and disappearances in the U.S. and South Vietnam all Marine CH-46D Sea Knights were grounded on 30 June, however the CH-46A continued flying. On 31 August a CH-46A on a medical evacuation mission to USS Tripoli disintegrated in midair killing all its occupants. The following day another CH-46A experienced a similar incident at Marble Mountain Air Facility leading to the type being grounded for all except emergency situations and cutting Marine airlift capacity in half. An investigation conducted by a joint Naval Air Systems Command/Boeing Vertol accident investigation team revealed that structural failures were occurring in the area of the rear pylon resulting in the rear rotor tearing off in flight and may have been the cause of several earlier losses. The team recommended structural and systems modifications to reinforce the rear rotor mount as well as installation of an indicator to detect excessive strain on critical parts of the aircraft. The modified CH-46As began returning to service in December 1967 and all had been returned to service by February 1968.

== July ==
1 July

U.S. Ambassador Ellsworth Bunker presented the 20 F-5As of the 10th Fighter Squadron (Commando) to Kỳ at Bien Hoa Air Base. These would form the RVNAF's first jet fighter squadron.

2–14 July

Operation Buffalo was a major operation that took place in the southern half of the DMZ, northeast of Con Thien. On 2 July the PAVN 90th Regiment ambushed the 1st Battalion 9th Marines, the Marines suffered 84 killed, 190 wounded and 9 missing making this the worst one-day loss for the Marines in Vietnam.

7 July

The North Vietnamese politburo approved plans for the general offensive and uprising to be mounted in South Vietnam in 1968. Nguyễn Chí Thanh, the commander of Central Office for South Vietnam, died in Hanoi from a heart attack, wounds suffered in an air raid or poisoning by allies of Võ Nguyên Giáp as part of an internal coup against Thanh's ally, party leader Lê Duẩn.

USAF Major General William J. Crumm, was one six people killed when the B-52 bomber he was on collided with another B-52 over the South China Sea. Crumm was the highest ranking USAF casualty of the war.

9 July

Operation Hong Kil Dong was the largest South Korean operation of the Vietnam War to halt PAVN/VC infiltration near Tuy Hòa. The operation resulted in 638 PAVN/VC killed and 88 captured and 26 Koreans killed.

10 July

The 4th Battalion, 503rd Airborne Infantry was ambushed by the PAVN K-101D Battalion of the Doc Lap Regiment near Đăk Tô, losing 26 killed while only six PAVN were killed.

The ARVN repelled an attack by the PAVN 141st Regiment on Tanhun base 5 miles (8.0 km) east of An Lộc killing 116 PAVN for the loss of 15 killed.

11 July – 31 October

Operation Diamond Head was conducted by the 3rd Brigade, 25th Infantry Division in Tây Ninh Province. The operation resulted in 136 PAVN and 35 U.S. killed.

Operation Fremont was conducted by the 1st Battalion, 3rd Marines, 2nd Battalion, 3rd Marines, 1st Battalion, 4th Marines, 2nd Battalion, 4th Marines and 3rd Battalion, 26th Marines west of Huế. The operation resulted in 123 PAVN/VC and 17 Marines killed.

12 July

In a meeting in Saigon, McNamara, Westmoreland and Wheeler agreed a troop ceiling of 525,000, which was approved by Johnson later that day.

In an engagement 5 miles (8.0 km) south of Đức Cơ Camp 35 soldiers from the 4th Infantry Division were killed by the PAVN.

13 July

An explosion in a Huế restaurant killed two Vietnamese. Twelve Vietnamese, seven Americans and one Filipino were injured.

14 July

In a PAVN rocket attack on Da Nang Air Base over 50 122mm rockets destroyed 10 aircraft, barracks and a bomb dump, damaging a further 40 aircraft and killing eight Americans and wounding 176.

VC dressed in ARVN uniforms captured a prison in Hội An, releasing about 1,000 of the 1,200 inmates; they executed 30 in the prison yard. Ten civilians were killed and 29 wounded as the VC fought their way out of the area.

16 July – 31 October

Operation Kingfisher was a 3rd Marine Division operation in the western part of Leatherneck Square. The operation resulted in 1,117 PAVN killed and five captured and 340 Marines killed.

17 July - mid-December

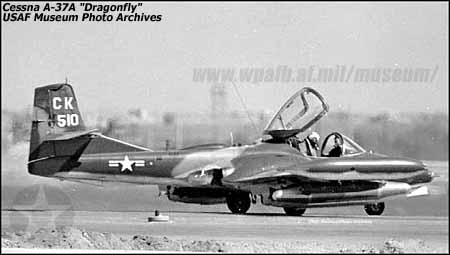
Cessna A-37A Dragonfly 67-14510 of the 604th Air Commando Squadron, 1968

Project Combat Dragon was the combat testing of the A-37A Dragonfly at Bien Hoa Air Base by the 604th Air Commando Squadron.

21 July to 2 August

Operation Emporia was an 11th Armored Cavalry Regiment land clearing operation along Route 20 from Gia Tan to the La Nga River. The 11th ACR was ambushed by the VC 275th Regiment and the 1st Battalion of the VC Dong Hai Regiment. The operation resulted in 96 VC and 14 U.S. killed.

23-8 July

The 1967 Detroit riot took place. On the night of the 24th Johnson ordered the deployment of troops and units of the 82nd and 101st Airborne were sent into the city to restore order.

24 July

A battalion of the PAVN 32nd Regiment attacked a 4th Infantry Division patrol 4 miles (6.4 km) south of Đức Cơ Camp. The patrol withdrew and called in artillery and air support killing 124 PAVN and capturing eight for losses of 19 killed.

25 July

VC appeared at homes in Bình Triệu, Long An Province and kidnapped four men, a woman and the woman's 16-year-old son. All six were found the following morning along Highway 13, shot in the head with their hands tied behind their backs.

27–31 July

Operation Coronado II was conducted by the MRF and ARVN units in an attempt to shut down VC strongholds in the Mekong Delta. The operation resulted in 73 VC killed and 68 captured and 9 U.S. killed.

29 July

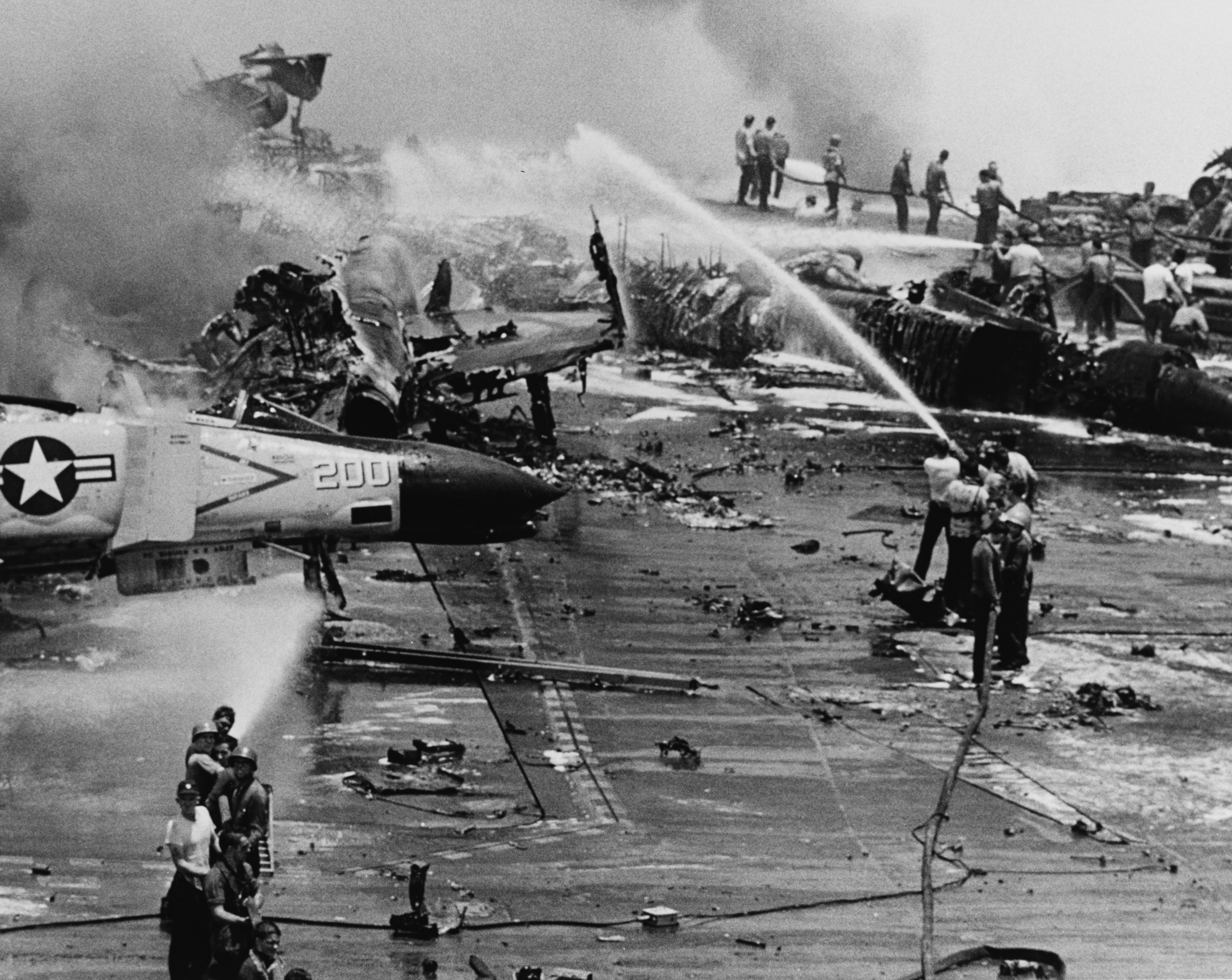
USS Forrestal fire

A fire on the USS Forrestal operating in the Gulf of Tonkin killed 134 sailors and destroyed 21 aircraft.

29 July - 1 August

In the 1967 Opium War a Shan United Revolutionary Army-led mule train carrying 16 tons of opium crossed into Laos to Ban Khwan, where they were attacked by rival drug smugglers from the Chinese Nationalists' Third and Fifth Armies. The intended recipient of the shipment, Royal Lao Army General Ouane Rattikone, bombed both sides while moving in troops to sweep the battlefield, killing 82 Shan and 70 Nationalists and confiscated the opium for himself.

31 July

A Gallup poll showed that 52% of the U.S. public disapproved of Johnson's handling of the war with 56% thinking that the U.S. was losing ground or stalled and 42% thinking that it was a mistake to have sent troops into South Vietnam.

late July

In a continuation of the "Revisionist Anti-Party Affair" from January 1964, a series of arrests of "anti-Party" traitors was made in Hanoi. Hoàng Minh Chính and others were accused of plotting against the party and supplying information to an unnamed foreign power, presumably the Soviet Union. A second wave of arrests took place on 18 October and a third wave in December 1967. The arrests effectively removed allies of Võ Nguyên Giáp and opponents to Lê Duẩn's leadership.

== August ==
1 August

The U.S. State Department reported that the Cambodian government had rejected a U.S. proposal for talks aimed at preventing PAVN use of Cambodian territory.

2 August

Two U.S. helicopter gunships returning VC fire coming from the village of Phú Vĩnh in the Mekong Delta killed 40 South Vietnamese civilians.

2–13 August

Operation Hood River was an operation conducted by Task Force Oregon, the ROK 2nd Marine Brigade and ARVN Ranger Battalions in Quảng Ngãi Province. The operation resulted in 166 PAVN and 21 U.S. killed.

3 August

Johnson asked Congress to temporarily increase individual and corporate income taxes by 10 percent for the 1968 tax year and announced that he had approved sending an additional 45,000 American troops to fight in the Vietnam War before June 30, 1968, bringing the total number of U.S. personnel in South Vietnam to 525,000.

6 August

The Battle of Suoi Chau Pha was fought between the 7th Battalion, Royal Australian Regiment and the VC 274th Regiment in Hát Dịch. The battle resulted in seven VC killed and a further 33 estimated killed and six Australians killed.

7 August

The New York Times published an article by R. W. Apple Jr. titled "Vietnam: the signs of Stalemate." The story quoted one U.S. general (later revealed to be Lieutenant General Frederick Weyand) saying "I've destroyed the [ ] Division three times."

The VC shot down five U.S. helicopters supporting Operation Fairfax along the Saigon River 4 miles (6.4 km) from Saigon, wounding Brigadier General John F. Freund.

8-25 August

The Senate Preparedness Investigating Subcommittee began hearings on the conduct of the war. Military leaders testified that they were subject to undue restrictions from the civilian leadership, while McNamara testified that the bombing campaign was ineffective.

Republican House minority leader Gerald Ford said that no more combat troops should be sent to South Vietnam until Johnson removed restrictions on bombing the North.

11 August

The Long Biên Bridge in Hanoi was attacked by U.S. fighter-bombers destroying the center span.

11-27 August

Operation Cochise was conducted by BLT 1/3 Marines 7 miles (11 km) east of Quế Sơn. The operation resulted in 59 PAVN/VC killed and 65 suspects captured, Marine losses were nine killed.

13–29 August

Operation Benton was conducted by the 1st Brigade, 101st Airborne Division in Quảng Tín Province against PAVN Base Area 117. The operation resulted in 503 PAVN and 45 U.S. killed.

15 August

National Police chief General Nguyễn Ngọc Loan ordered the arrest of two VC operatives who were on their way to meet with U.S. Embassy representatives as part of a secret initiative code-named Buttercup. Loan's stand against such "backdoor" dealing, and his opposition to releasing one of the VC negotiators angered the Americans, and forced them to keep both him and the South Vietnamese better informed of diplomatic dealings involving their country.

19 August – 9 September

Operation Coronado IV was an MRF operation against VC in Long An, Gò Công and Kiến Hòa Provinces. The operation resulted in 59 VC killed.

21 August

Two United States Navy A-6A Intruder jets were shot down over the People's Republic of China after straying into Chinese airspace while attempting an attack on North Vietnam. Lieutenant Robert J. Flynn would remain a Chinese prisoner until 15 March 1973.

23 August

VPAF interceptors shot down three USAF F-4Ds.

26 August

Twenty-two South Vietnamese civilians died and six were injured when their bus struck a VC mine in Kien Hoa Province.

27 August

A week before presidential and senate elections, the VC conducted a recoilless rifle and mortar attack on Cần Thơ killed 46 and injured 227. Ten civilians were killed and ten were injured in an attack on a CORDS team in Phước Long Province. Fourteen civilians, including five children, were wounded by VC mortar fire southeast of Ban Me Thuot. Two civilians died and one was wounded in an attack on a hamlet in Binh Long Province. Six civilians were kidnaped from Phuoc Hung village in Thừa Thiên Province. A VC battalion attacked Hội An overrunning a U.S. Navy medical compound and killing one Navy corpsman for the loss of nine VC killed, more than 60 South Vietnamese were also killed or wounded in the attack. 17 ARVN were killed in VC attacks on bases around Hội An.

28 August

A PAVN rocket attack on Dong Ha Combat Base killed three Marines. A PAVN/VC rocket attack on Marble Mountain Air Facility killed four Marines.

30 August

The first six AH-1 Cobras arrive at Bien Hoa Air Base for combat testing by the U.S. Army Cobra New Equipment Training Team.

The VC attacked a prison in Quảng Ngãi Province freeing 1,200 prisoners, although 400 were recaptured shortly afterwards.

PAVN mortar attacks on Phu Bai Combat Base damaged 13 helicopters, killing two Seebees and wounding 32 Marines and Seebees. Sixteen ARVN at a nearby training center were killed in the attack.

31 August

The Senate Preparedness Investigating Subcommittee urged Johnson to abandon restrictions on the bombing of North Vietnam and close the port of Haiphong.

== September ==
1 September

VC explosives blasted six craters in National Route 4 in Dinh Tuong Province, stopping all vehicular traffic except an ARVN ambulance bus which ran over a pressure mine, killing 13 passengers, injuring 23.

3 September

In the 1967 South Vietnamese presidential election, Thiệu was elected President of South Vietnam, with Kỳ as his running mate.

Shortly after polls open in Tuy Hòa the VC detonated a bomb hidden in a polling place. Three voters were killed and 42 wounded. Election morning attacks, including long-range shellings, claimed 48 lives.

A PAVN rocket attack on Dong Ha Combat Base hit the ammunition dump and fuel storage facility causing a huge explosion that damaged 17 helicopters of HMM-361 and wounded 77 Marines.

4 September

An AH-1 Cobra piloted by General George P. Seneff made the type's first combat kill, sinking a sampan and killing four VC near Muc Hoa.

Michigan governor George Romney, a leading contender for the Republican presidential nomination, stated that he had been "brainwashed" by U.S. military leaders into supporting the war while on a visit to South Vietnam in 1965. The statement invited criticism and Romney attempted to walk it back stating that the Johnson administration had "kept the American people from knowing the facts about the Vietnam war and its full impact on our domestic and foreign affairs."

4–15 September

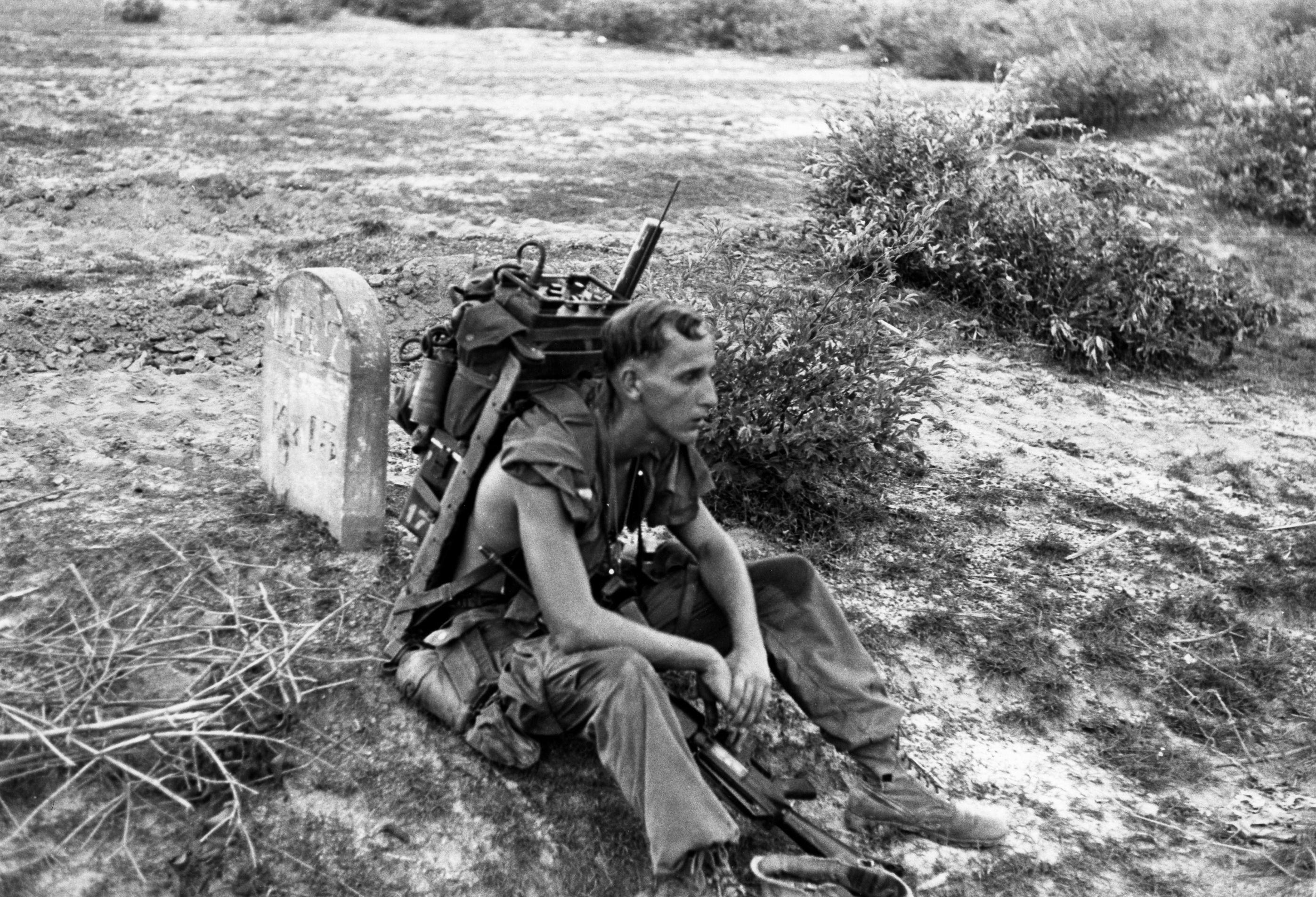
Marine forward air controller during Operation Swift

Operation Swift was a search and destroy mission in the Quế Sơn Valley carried out by the 1st Marine Division. Launched on 4 September 1967, the ensuing battles resulted in an estimated 600 PAVN killed and 127 U.S. and 28 ARVN killed.

5 September – 31 October

Operation Dragon Fire was conducted by the South Korean 2nd Marine Brigade on the Batangan Peninsula. The operation resulted in 541 VC and 46 Koreans killed.

11 September

In an interview with U.S. News & World Report U.S. Army Chief of Staff General Harold Keith Johnson stated that "If you exclude the two northernmost provinces of South Vietnam, just south of the Demilitarized Zone, you find that the major forces of the enemy have already been largely broken up... I do not believe that they any longer have the capacity of regular, planned reinforcement."

11 September - October

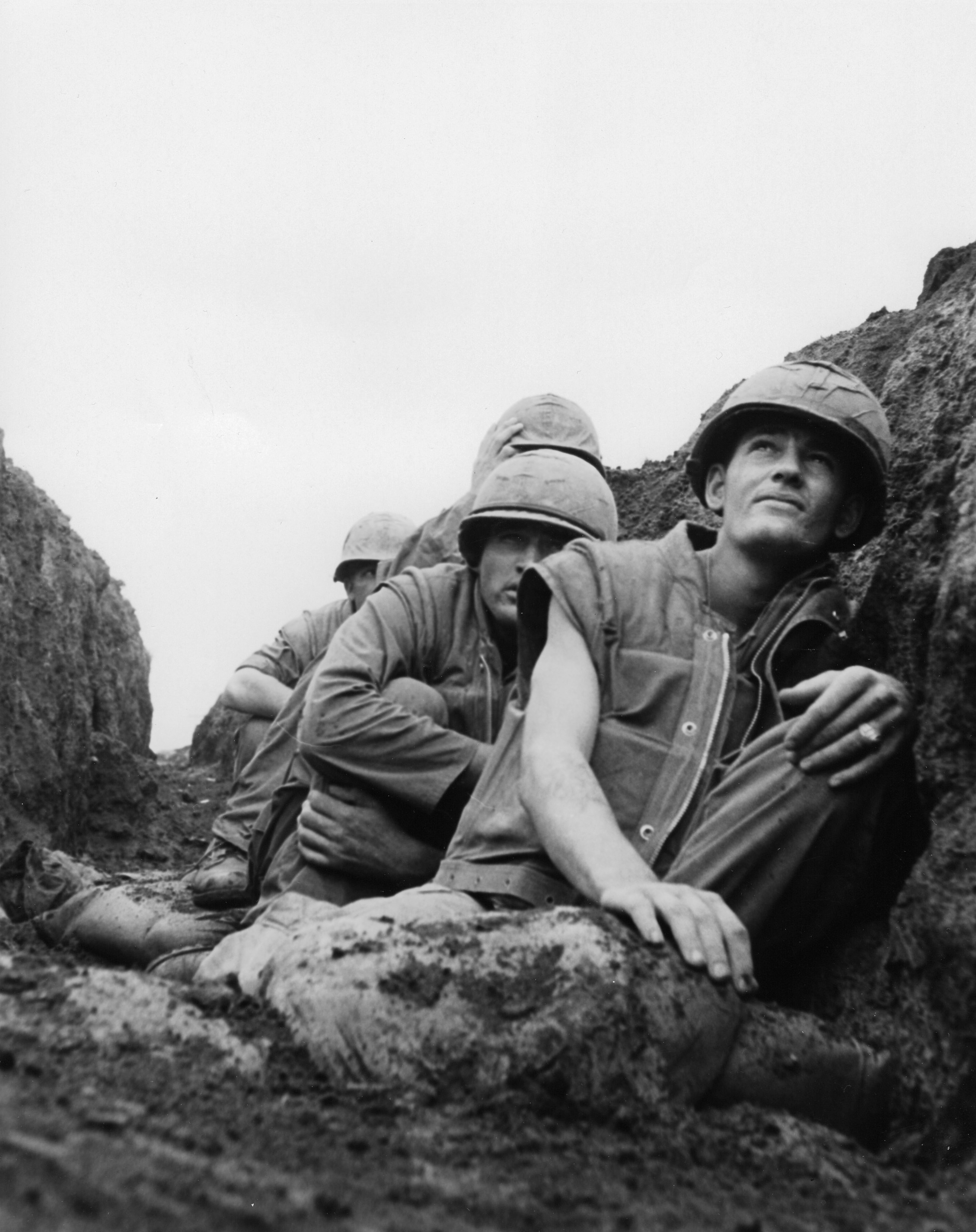
Marines take cover from PAVN artillery fire at Con Thien

PAVN artillery begins bombarding Con Thien with a peak of 1,200 rounds hitting the base on 25 September. CBS News broadcast the first footage of the bombardment on 11 September 1967. TIME featured the story on the cover of its 6 October 1967 issue. David Douglas Duncan's photos of the Marines at Con Thien were featured in the 27 October 1967 issue of Life magazine. CBS News broadcast a special report on 1 October, The Ordeal of Con Thien, hosted by Mike Wallace, which featured footage and interviews from the field.

11 September – 11 November 1968

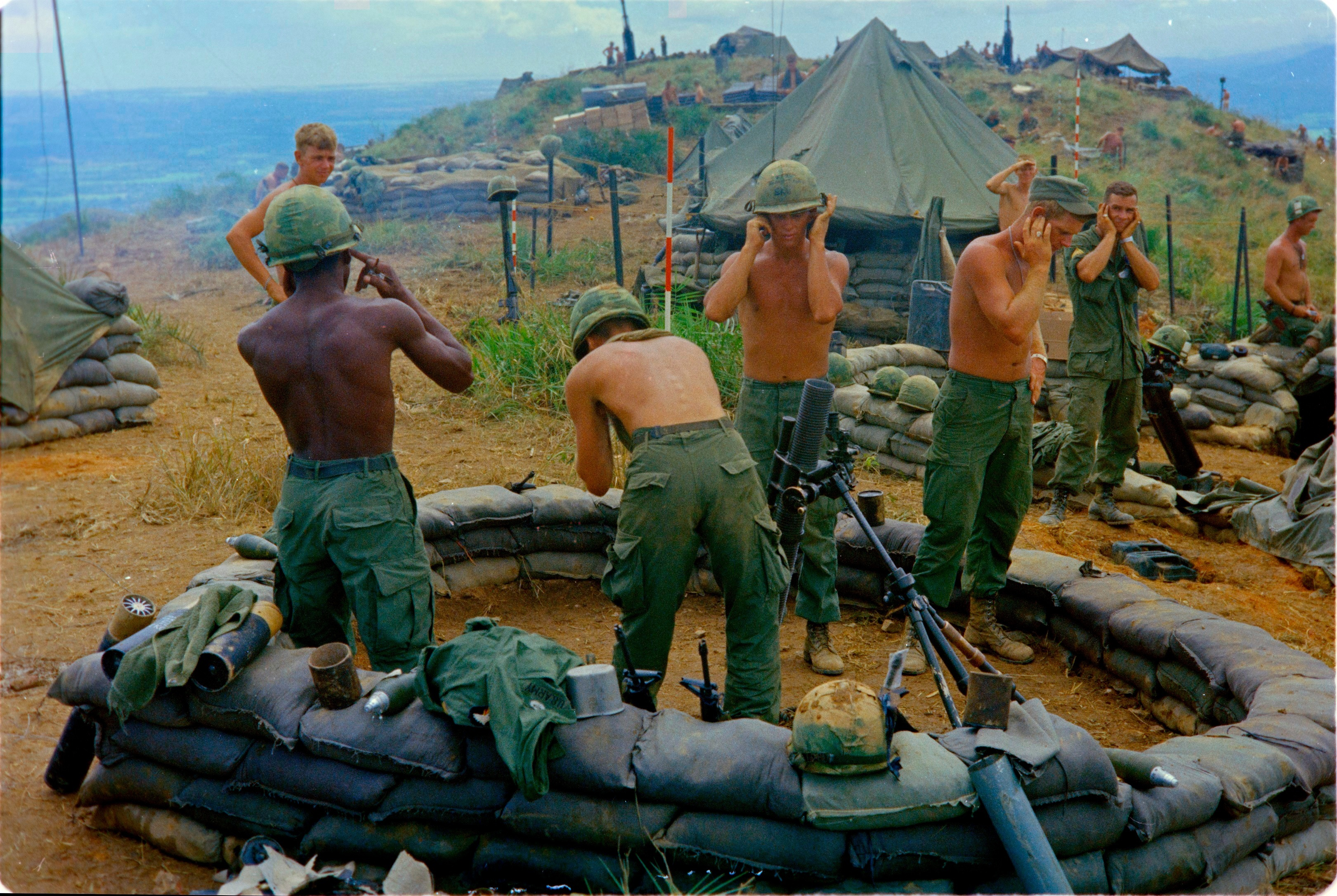
101st Airborne mortar firing during Operation Wheeler

Operation Wheeler/Wallowa was an operation conducted by the 101st Airborne Division and 1st Cavalry Division and then progressively taken over by 23rd Infantry (Americal) Division in Hiệp Đức District-Quế Sơn Valley. The operation resulted in 3,300 PAVN and 200 U.S. killed.

12 September

CIA Director Richard Helms presented Johnson with a classified report titled "Implications of an Unfavorable Outcome in Vietnam", prepared by analysts in the Office of National Estimates. According to the analysis, "failure would not come as a result of a complete military and political collapse of the U.S. effort in Vietnam, but would evolve from the likely compromise solution that would result from a peace settlement... to the advantage of the Vietnamese Communists". Moreover, the CIA told Johnson, there would be "permanent damage... to the United States in the international arena", internal dissension within the U.S. and destabilization of the other non-Communist nations in Southeast Asia.

The West German hospital ship MV Helgoland moved to Danang from Saigon and would treat civilian patients until 31 December 1971 when it was replaced by a new 170 bed hospital ashore.

12 September – 7 October

Operation Coronado V was an MRF/ARVN operation in Định Tường Province to engage the VC 263rd Main Force Battalion. The operation resulted in 376 VC and 23 U.S. killed.

14-6 September

Radio Hanoi read the text of Võ Nguyên Giáp's article "Big Victory, Giant Task" setting out how he saw the North Vietnamese achieving victory in the war.

15 September – 10 November

Operation Kunia was conducted by the 1st Brigade, 25th Infantry Division against VC base areas in the Ho Bo Woods. The operation resulted in 105 VC and 40 U.S. killed.

19 September

The Royal Thai Volunteer Regiment started its deployment in South Vietnam.

19 September – 31 January 1969

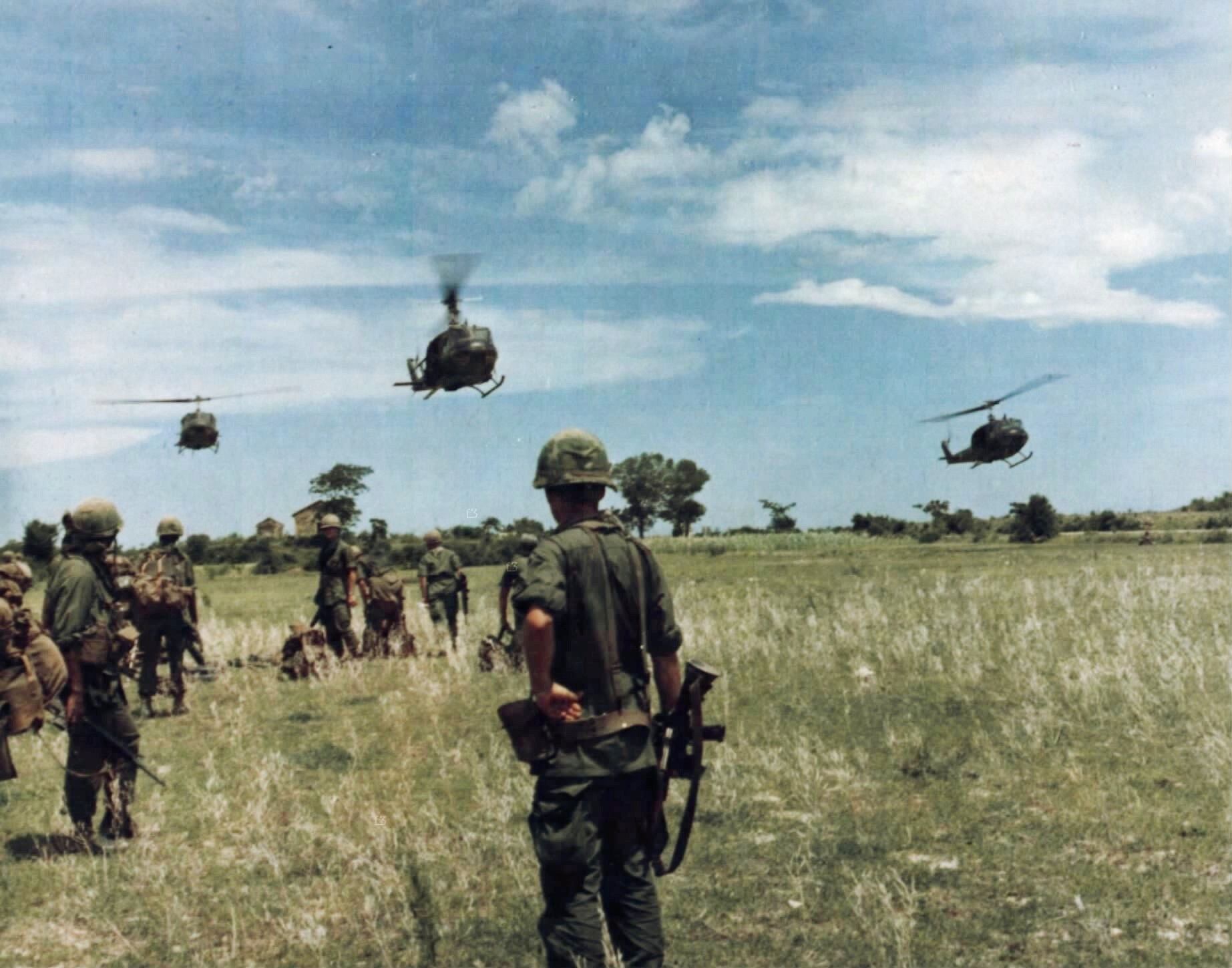
UH-1s landing during Operation Bolling

Operation Bolling was a search and destroy and security operation conducted by the 503rd Infantry Regiment in Phú Yên Province. The operation resulted in 683 PAVN killed and 59 captured and 67 U.S. killed.

27 September

Canada broke with the United States for the first time over Vietnam War policy, as External Affairs Minister Paul Martin addressed the United Nations General Assembly, suggesting that the U.S. make an unconditional halt to the bombing of North Vietnam. "All attempts to bring about talks between the two sides", Martin said, "are doomed to failure unless the bombing is stopped."

Republican Senator Thruston Ballard Morton said that Johnson had been "brainwashed" by the "military-industrial complex" to believe that military victory was possible in South Vietnam.

29 September

Speaking in Texas at San Antonio to the National Legislative Conference, President Johnson told his audience, "I am ready to talk tomorrow with Ho Chi Minh and other chiefs of state" to discuss an ending to the Vietnam War, but added that an immediate halt to bombing would happen only if he believed that it would "lead promptly to productive discussion", and that "It is by Hanoi's choice— not ours, not the world's— that war continues." Earlier in the speech, Johnson gave his reasons for a continued fight: "I cannot tell you— with certainty— that a southeast Asia dominated by communist power would bring a third world war closer to terrible reality", he said, "But all that we have learned in this tragic century strongly suggests that it would be so. As the President of the United States, I am not prepared to gamble on the chance that it is not so... I am convinced that by seeing this struggle through now, in Vietnam, we are reducing the chances of a larger war— perhaps a nuclear war." The North Vietnamese government would subsequently reject what would be referred to as "The San Antonio Formula" for peace.

The new U.S. Embassy opened in Saigon.

29 September – 10 December

Operation Shenandoah II was a security operation conducted by the 1st Infantry Division and ARVN forces along Highway 13. The operation resulted in 956 PAVN/VC killed.

== October ==
2-3 October

Republican senator John Sherman Cooper urged the Johnson administration to cease bombing North Vietnam as a first step to negotiations and Democratic senator Stuart Symington called for the U.S. to stop all military action in South Vietnam and push the Saigon government into negotiations with the VC. Democratic senator Gale W. McGee defended the Johnson administration's approach and Republican Senator Thomas Kuchel said that an unconditional bombing halt would aid North Vietnam.

3 October

U.S. bombers struck targets in North Vietnam as close as 10 miles (16 km) from China, striking the Loc Dinh highway bridge, the Bao Dang highway bridge 15 miles (24 km) from the frontier and the Ha Thuoc railroad yards, the northernmost penetration into North Vietnam.

4 October

The 3rd Brigade, 1st Cavalry Division began Operation Wallowa, which would be folded into Operation Wheeler on 11 November.

6 October

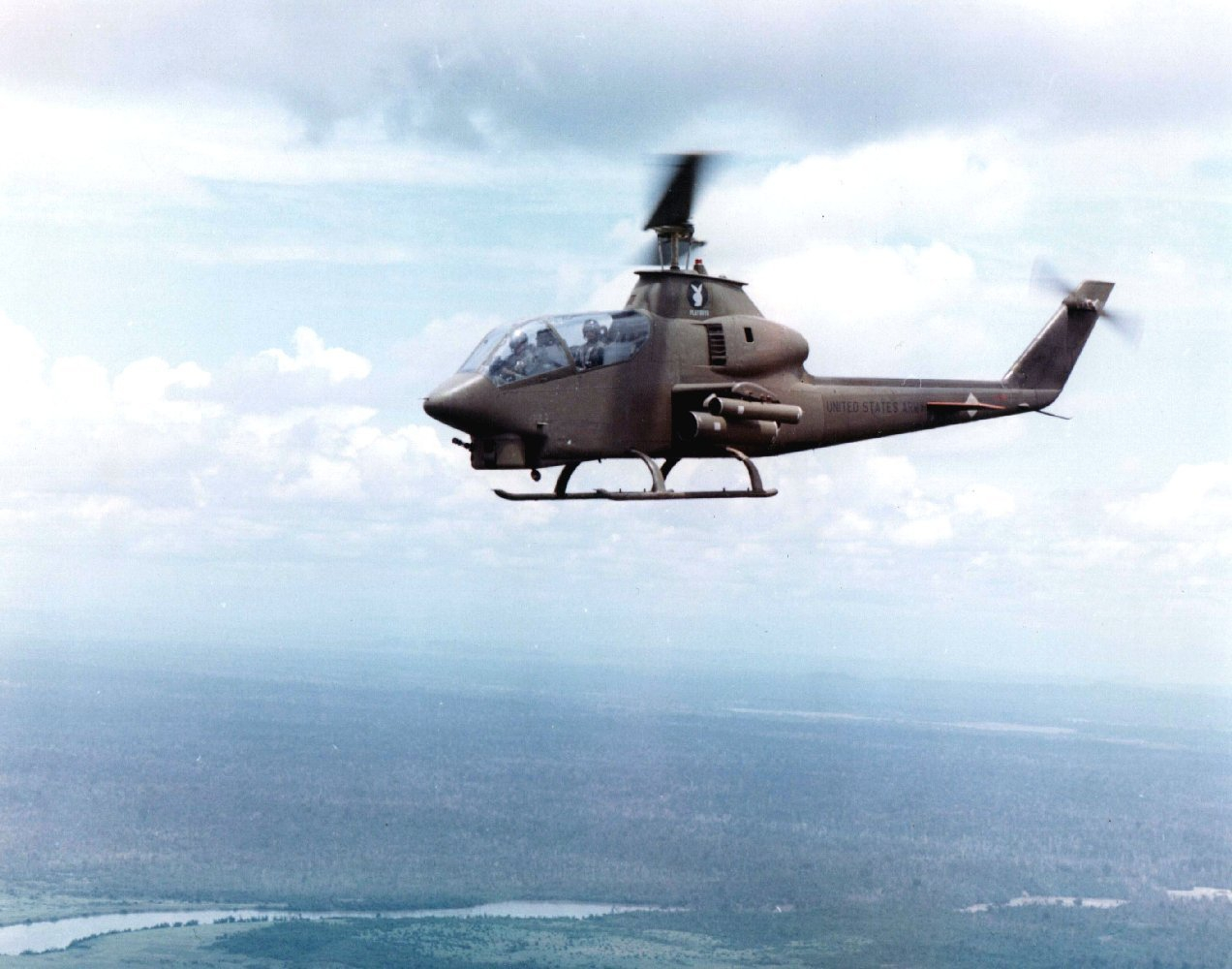
AH-1 Cobra of the 334th Assault Helicopter Company

The U.S. Army 334th Assault Helicopter Company became the first operational AH-1 Cobra gunship unit in South Vietnam.

8 October

A USAF C-130 crashed into a mountain in the Phú Lộc district 24 km southeast of Phu Bai Combat Base killing all 23 on board.

10–20 October

Operation Medina was a search and destroy operation conducted by the 3rd Marine Division in the Hải Lăng District. The operation resulted in 53 PAVN killed and three captured and 34 Marines killed.

12 October – 31 January 1969

Operation MacArthur conducted by the 4th Infantry Division and 173rd Airborne Brigade in western II Corps. The operation results in 5,731 PAVN/VC and 955 U.S. killed.

12-14 October

U.S. navy aircraft attacked port facilities in Haiphong. Left-wing journalist Wilfred Burchett claimed the raids had destroyed a hospital with no damage to the port and quoted the mayor of Haiphong as saying that bombing since 1 September had destroyed one third of the city's residential areas.

15 October

Senator Fulbright accused Rusk of using McCarthyite tactics against opponents to the war.

16 October

"Stop the Draft Week" was launched in front of Selective Service System induction centers of 30 American cities, by thousands of people protesting against the war. In Oakland, 600 demonstrators blocked the entrance of that city's center, including folk singer and activist Joan Baez, who was one of 125 people arrested. In New York City, 300 demonstrators blocked center entrances. Buses brought protesters to Boston, where 70 draft cards were burned and 200 cards turned over to clergymen of the Unitarian Universalist Church. Similar anti-draft protests took place in Los Angeles; Chicago; Washington, D.C.; San Francisco; Philadelphia; Minneapolis; Portland, Oregon; Albany, New York; and Ithaca, New York; where people either attempted to give their draft cards back to federal authorities, or burned them. According to one account, over 1,000 cards were turned in during the week, and "by the end of the war, 600,000 men had violated the Selective Service laws," with only 3 percent actually prosecuted.

17 October

The Battle of Ong Thanh saw the soldiers of the 2nd Battalion, 28th Infantry Regiment, ambushed by a well-entrenched VC regiment. U.S. losses were 64 killed and 2 missing, VC losses were at least 22 killed.

In a television interview Johnson denied "trying to label all criticism of his Vietnam policy as unpatriotic" saying he questioned the judgment of critics, not their motives.

The antiwar rock musical Hair debuted.

20 October – 16 February 1968

Operation Osceola was a security operation conducted by the 3rd Marine Division around Quảng Trị Combat Base. The operation resulted in 100 PAVN and 19 Marines killed.

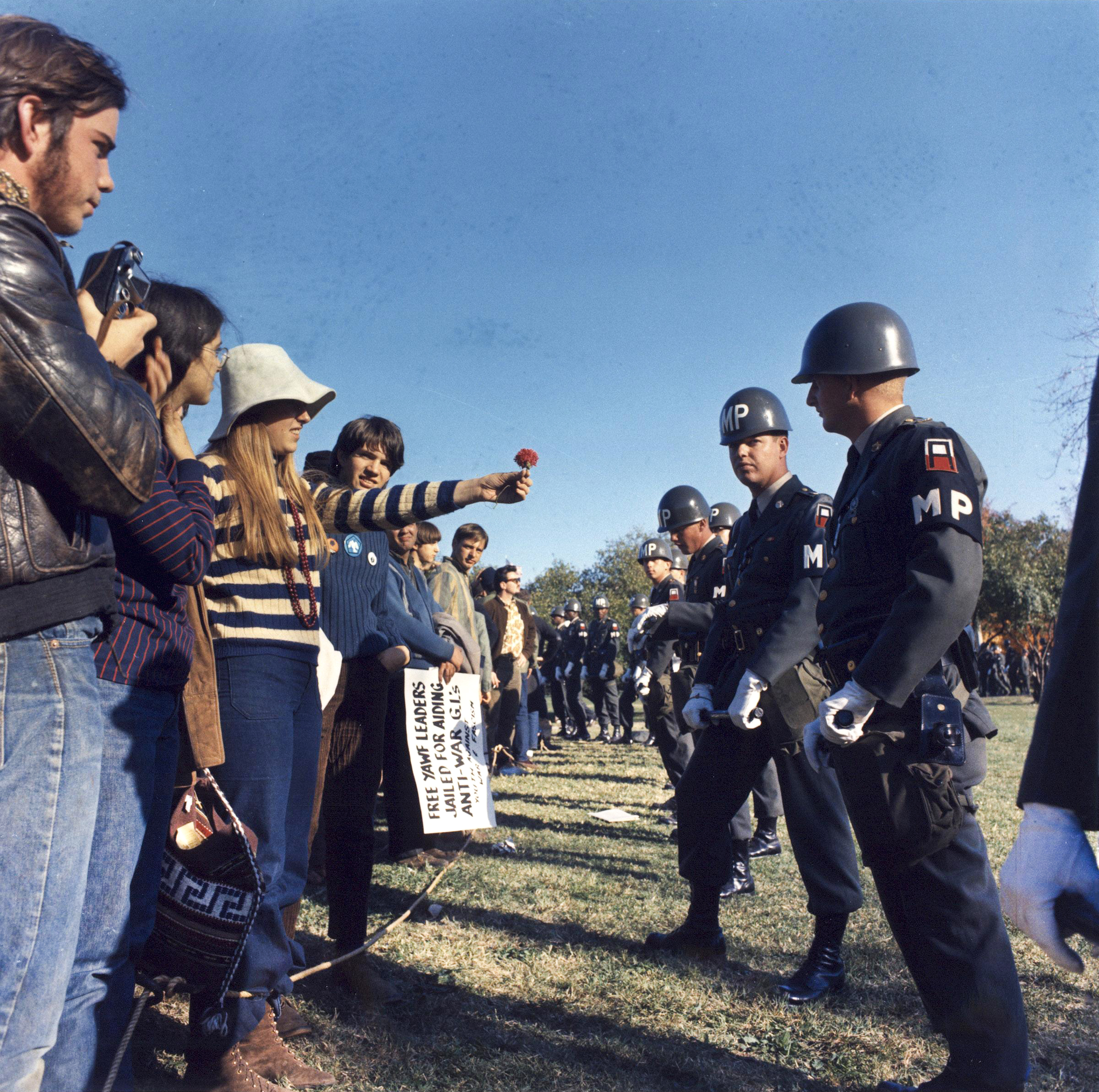
A female demonstrator offers a flower to military police on guard at the Pentagon during an anti-Vietnam demonstration

21 October

Approximately 50,000 Americans joined the March on the Pentagon and some 650 were arrested.

Life called for a bombing pause in a shift in editorial policy.

23 October

Four crewmen from the USS Intrepid failed to return to their ship after a day of shore leave in Tokyo. The Intrepid Four, with the assistance of the Beheiren, defected to the Soviet Union and then received asylum in Sweden.

Democratic representative Mo Udall described U.S. involvement in Vietnam as "a mistaken and dangerous road" and called for reversing escalation of the war, and eventual U.S. withdrawal.

24 October

U.S. Army Lieutenant General Lewis B. Hershey, the Director of the Selective Service System, issued the first of two memoranda that would collectively become known as the "Hershey Directive", ordering draft boards nationwide to draft anti-war protesters into the armed services. An injunction against enforcing the directive would be issued by a federal court and the United States Court of Appeals would rule on 6 June 1969, that draft boards had no right to reclassify any registrants based on protest activities.

26 October

U.S. Navy Lieutenant Commander John McCain was captured when his A-4E Skyhawk was shot down on a bombing mission over Hanoi.

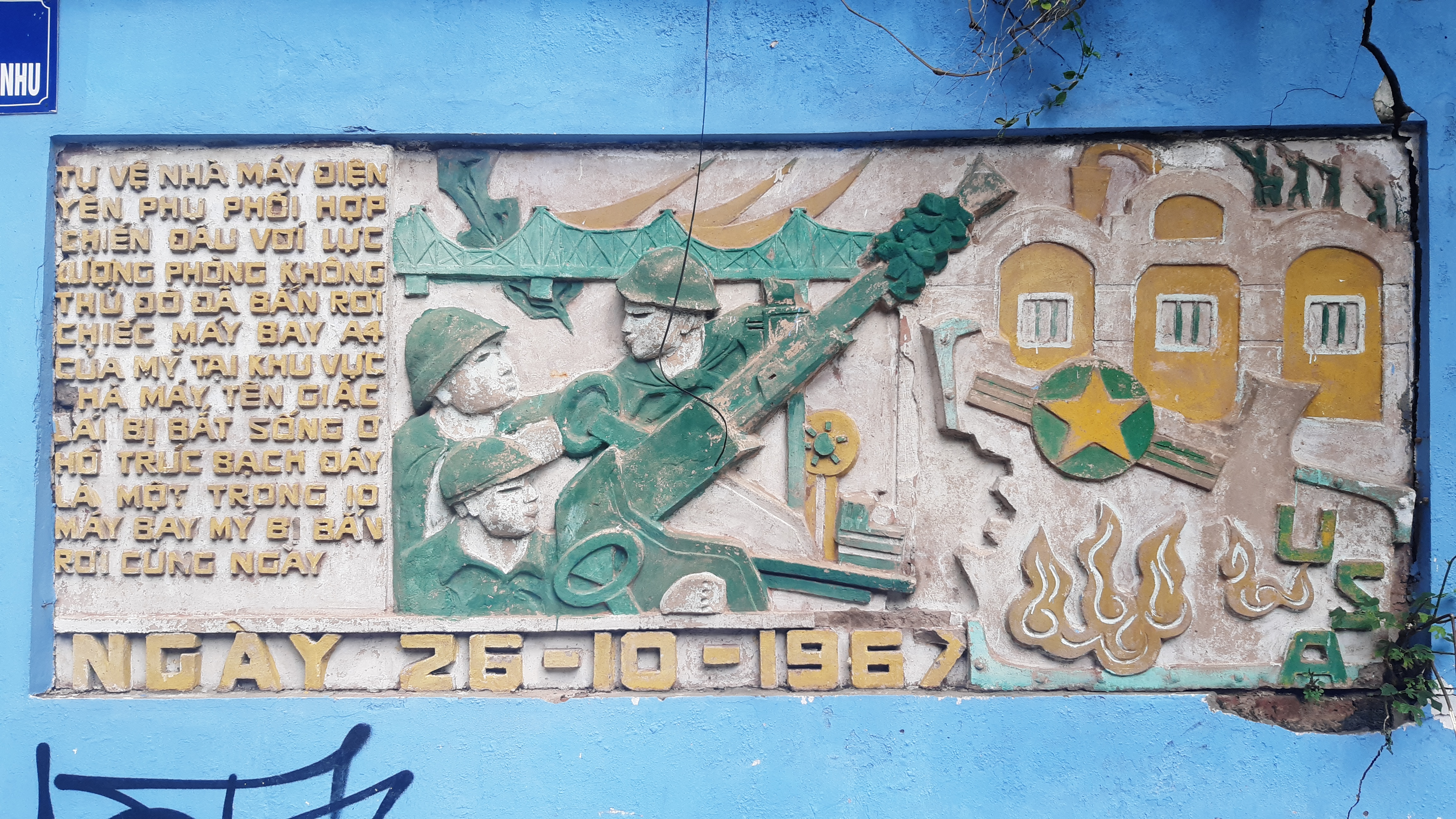
The events of 26 October 1967 commemorated in a street mural in Hanoi, Vietnam

USAF and U.S. Navy jets shot down four MiG-17s and a MiG-21.

27 October

Father Philip Berrigan, a Roman Catholic priest in the St. Peter Claver Church of Baltimore, broke into the city's selective service office and poured blood into 16 file drawers as a protest against the war. Berrigan, who was sent to jail, was joined in the attack by Reverend James Mengel of the United Church of Christ, Thomas Lewis and David Eberhardt of the Baltimore Interfaith Peace organization.

29 October – 7 November

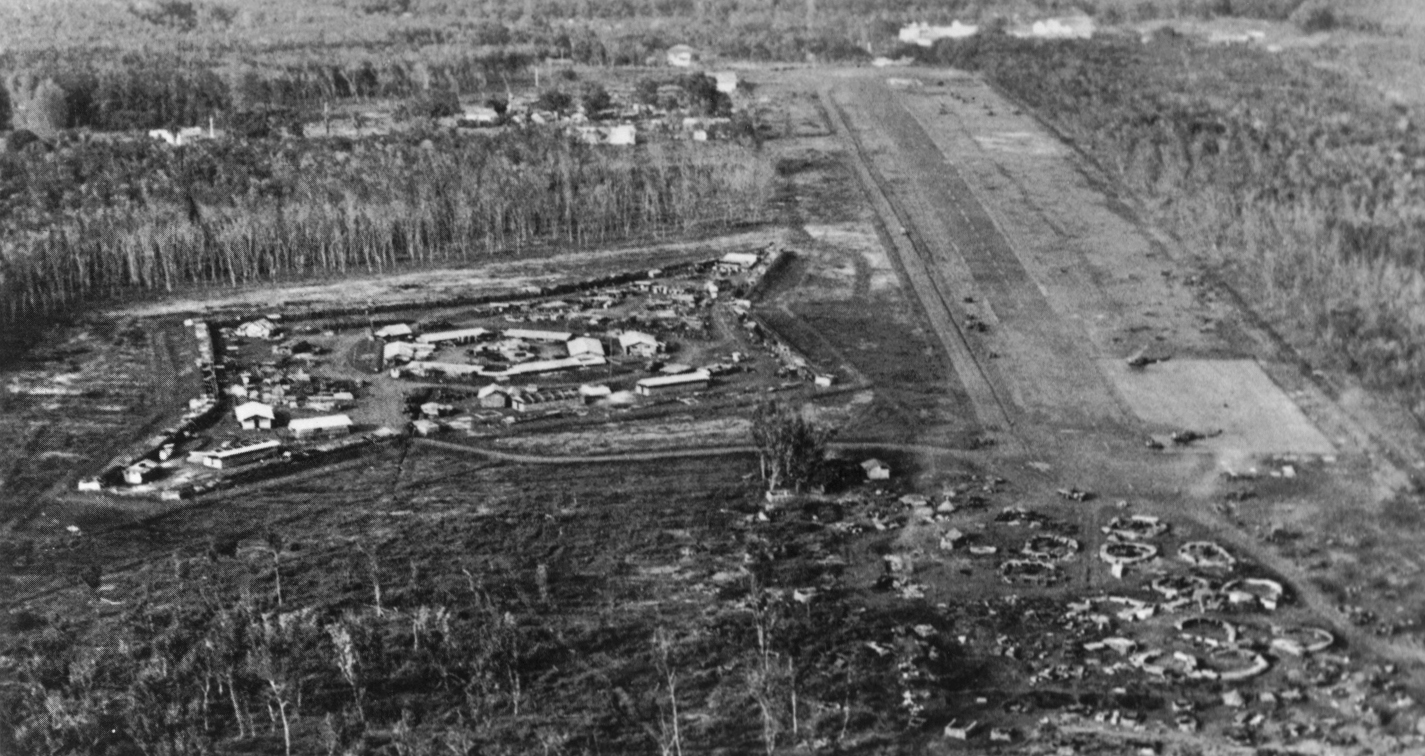
Loc Ninh camp

The first battle of Loc Ninh was fought by the VC and the CIDG forces and ended when ARVN and US forces relieved the camp. VC losses were 852 killed and ARVN losses were 50 killed.

31 October

VC mortar rounds hit the grounds of the Independence Palace in Saigon during an inauguration party for Thieu which was attended by U.S. Vice President Hubert Humphrey, three people were injured.

== November ==
1 November

Humphrey presented the Presidential Unit Citation to the 3rd Marine Division and the ARVN 7th Airborne Battalion.

1 November – 20 January 1968

Operation Lancaster was a 3rd Marine Division operation to prevent PAVN infiltration from across the DMZ and from the west and to provide artillery and logistical support to the Marines at Khe Sanh. The operation resulted in 46 PAVN and 22 Marines killed.

1 November – 22 January 1968

Operation Coronado IX was an MRF/ARVN operation in the Mekong Delta. The operation resulted in 434 VC and 76 U.S. killed.

1 November – 25 January 1968

Operation Neosho was a 3rd Marine Division security operation in northern Thừa Thiên Province. The operation resulted in 77 PAVN killed and 9 captured and 12 Marines killed.

1 November – 28 February 1969

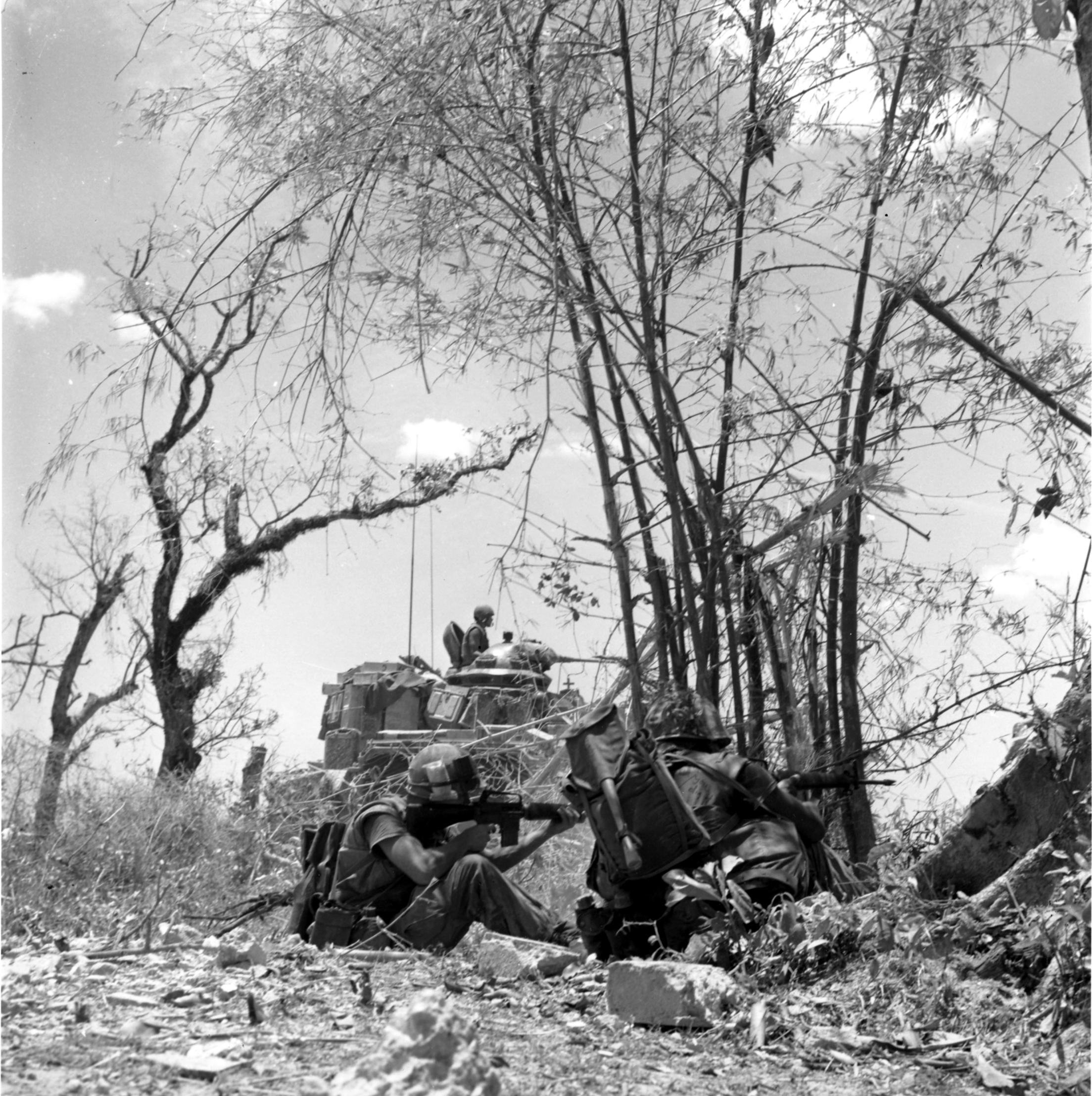
9th Marines supported by an M48 engage PAVN during Operation Kentucky

Operation Kentucky was a 3rd Marine Division operation to secure the Con Thien area against PAVN attacks. The operation resulted in 3,839 PAVN killed and 117 captured and 520 Marines killed.

2 November

Johnson held a secret meeting at the White House with a group of "former officials whose advice he trusted" and asked them to suggest ways to unite the American people behind the war effort. The panel, referred to in later histories as "the Wise Men", included Dean Acheson, McGeorge Bundy, Clark Clifford, Henry Cabot Lodge Jr. and Maxwell Taylor, who urged the President to continue the war effort and to give the American people more optimistic reports on the war's progress, based on their conclusion that the U.S. was winning the war effort.

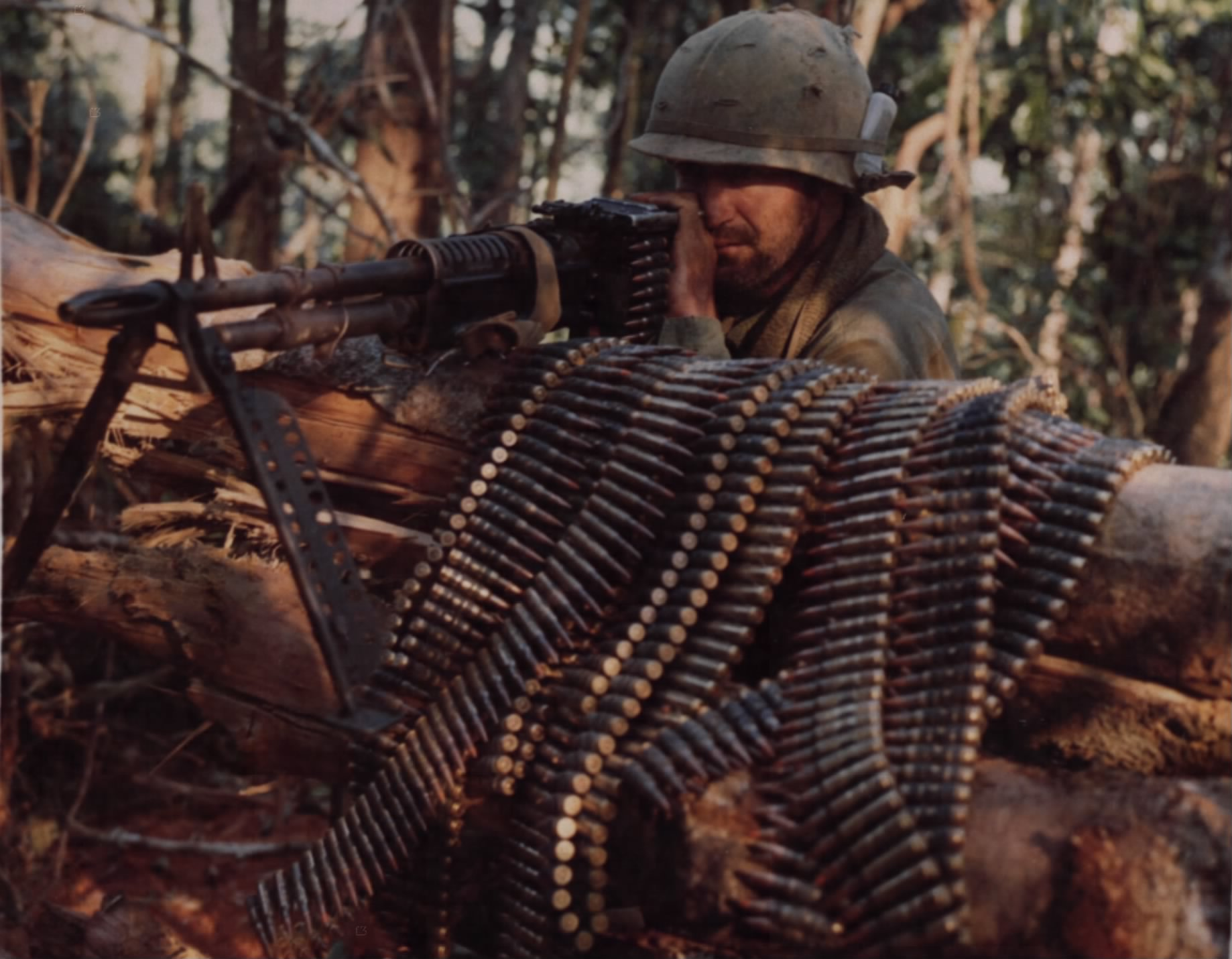
An M-60 machine gunner in position during the Battle of Dak To

3–22 November

The Battle of Đắk Tô was a series of major engagements that took place in Kon Tum Province. U.S. losses were 361 killed and 15 missing, ARVN losses were 73 killed and 18 missing and PAVN losses were estimated at 1,000–1,664.

3 November – 5 January 1968

Operation Santa Fe was a security operation conducted by the U.S. 1st Brigade, 9th Infantry Division, the 1st Australian Task Force and the ARVN 18th Division against the May Tao Secret Zone. The operation resulted in 126 VC and six U.S. killed.

6–17 November

Operation Essex was conducted by the 2nd Battalion, 5th Marines in "Antenna Valley", Hiệp Đức District to push PAVN/VC units into U.S. Army units conducting Operation Wheeler/Wallowa. the operation resulted in 60+ PAVN and 16 Marines killed.

7 November

First Sergeant Pascal Poolaw, a Kiowa serving with C Company 26th Infantry Regiment, the most decorated Native American soldier in the U.S. Army, was killed while attempting to aid a casualty during the Battle of Loc Ninh.

8 November

The Ky Chanh refugee center in Quảng Tín Province was infiltrated by VC who killed four persons, wounded nine others and kidnapped nine more; they also set fire to the camp's school.

9 November

Private McKinley Nolan deserted his unit, the 2nd Battalion, 16th Infantry Regiment near Saigon and joined the VC. The search for what happened to him would be the subject of the 2010 documentary film The Disappearance of McKinley Nolan.

11 November

MACV told reporters that the estimated number of PAVN/VC forces in South Vietnam had declined to 242,000 men, following the previous announced assessment of 299,000 and explained that the decrease was due to "heavy casualties and plummeting morale"; in reality, the decrease came because MACV had decided in July that some categories of VC should be dropped from the total estimate, which had been tallied at 299,000 at the beginning of 1967 in order to maintain the public position that PAVN/VC forces were less than 300,000. In 1975, a former CIA employee, Samuel A. Adams, would reveal the falsifying of numbers in testimony before the U.S. House Intelligence Committee. Adams would also reveal that his review of CIA documents indicated that the strength of the enemy had actually been 600,000 during 1967. Although the difficulties in attempting to put together an educated estimate of PAVN/VC strength in South Vietnam was described in a CIA report on the subject as "we lack precise basic data on population size, rates of growth, and age distribution for both North and South Vietnam", "Our data and conclusions are therefore subject to continuing review and revision, especially since capabilities do not remain static."

A Gallup poll found that 59% of Americans favored continuing the war with 55% saying the U.S. should increase its military effort and involvement.

The VC handed over three U.S. prisoners of war to antiwar activist Tom Hayden in Phnom Penh.

13 November

The Joint Chiefs of Staff recommended to The White House that no ceasefire be instigated for the Tết holiday period in January 1968 due to "the fraudulent manner in which the enemy has treated past ceasefires."

13-30 November

Operation Badger Hunt was a 2nd Battalion 3rd Marines search and destroy operation in Đại Lộc District, Quảng Nam Province. The operation resulted in 125 PAVN/VC killed and eight captured for Marine losses of 25 killed.

14 November

3rd Marine Division commander Major General Bruno Hochmuth and five others died in a helicopter crash northwest of Huế.

15–19 November

Operation Kien Giang 9-1 was an MRF/ARVN operation to sweep VC Base Area 470 in western Dinh Tuong Province. The operation resulted in at least 178 VC killed and 33 captured while U.S./ARVN losses were 26 killed.

17 November

Acting on optimistic reports he had been given by Westmoreland and Ambassador Bunker, Johnson said at a press conference that his advisers had assured him that the war in Vietnam was going well, in response to a reporter's question, and that it was a different kind of conflict. "We don't march out and have a big battle each day in a guerrilla war. It is a new kind of war for us. So it doesn't move that fast... We are making progress. We are pleased with the results that we are getting. We are inflicting greater losses than we are taking." Johnson received rave reviews from all that saw this press conference, many newspapers calling it "Johnson's new style" while others said this was the "real Johnson" as the President bullishly informed Hanoi that the United States was prepared to protect their ally from invasion from an aggressive neighbor.

18 November

The VC announced its willingness to honor a seven-day ceasefire during the Tết holiday, for a period running from 27 January through 2 February 1968.

USAF Brigadier General Edward B. Burdett died shortly after capture in North Vietnam having ejected from his F-105 which was hit by a SAM-2 missile.

19 November

Thiệu wrote to Ho Chi Minh to request secret talks to start a dialogue between the two countries to start the peace process.

U.S. forces in Quảng Tín Province captured a VC document ordering a General Offensive and General Uprising.

21 November

Westmoreland told the National Press Club in Washington, "I am absolutely certain that whereas in 1965 the enemy was winning, today he is certainly losing... we have reached an important point... when the end begins to come into view", and forecast that a third phase of the war, when the U.S. would turn over control of the war effort to the ARVN, would start at the beginning of 1968.

24 November

MACV reduced the estimate of VC strength from 294,000 to 223–248,000 troops against the advice of the CIA.

26 November

A USAF C-47D crashed while making an emergency landing at Tan Son Nhut Air Base killing all 26 on board.

27 November

The Joint Chiefs of Staff presented McNamara with their proposed plans for the next four months in the war. The recommendations included not agreeing to a truce period during the upcoming Tết celebrations.

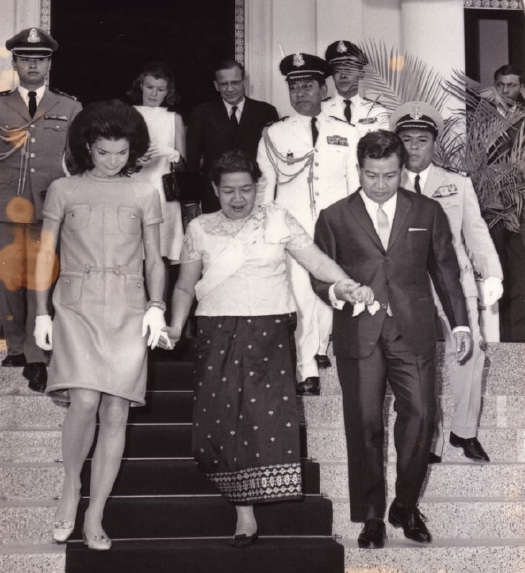
Prince Sihanouk (right)

Cambodian Head of State Prince Norodom Sihanouk reacted to U.S. press reports that the VC were using bases in Cambodia as sanctuaries by expelling all foreign journalists from the country.

29 November

McNamara announced his resignation and accepted a post as the President of the World Bank.

The VC 3rd Battalion, 272nd Regiment attacked Bù Đốp Camp which was defended by ARVN forces and the U.S. 1st Battalion, 28th Infantry Regiment and Battery A, 2nd Battalion, 33rd Artillery. The VC lost 31 killed in the attack and the U.S. seven killed.

30 November

U.S. Senator Eugene McCarthy of Minnesota announced his candidacy for the 1968 Democratic Party presidential nomination, in a direct challenge to the renomination of President Johnson. McCarthy said that he would enter the presidential primaries in Wisconsin, Nebraska, Oregon and California, and that he would probably declare for New Hampshire and Massachusetts as well.

A USAF C-7 Caribou crashed into a mountainside while on approach to Qui Nhơn airport, killing all 26 on board.

November – 9 December 1968

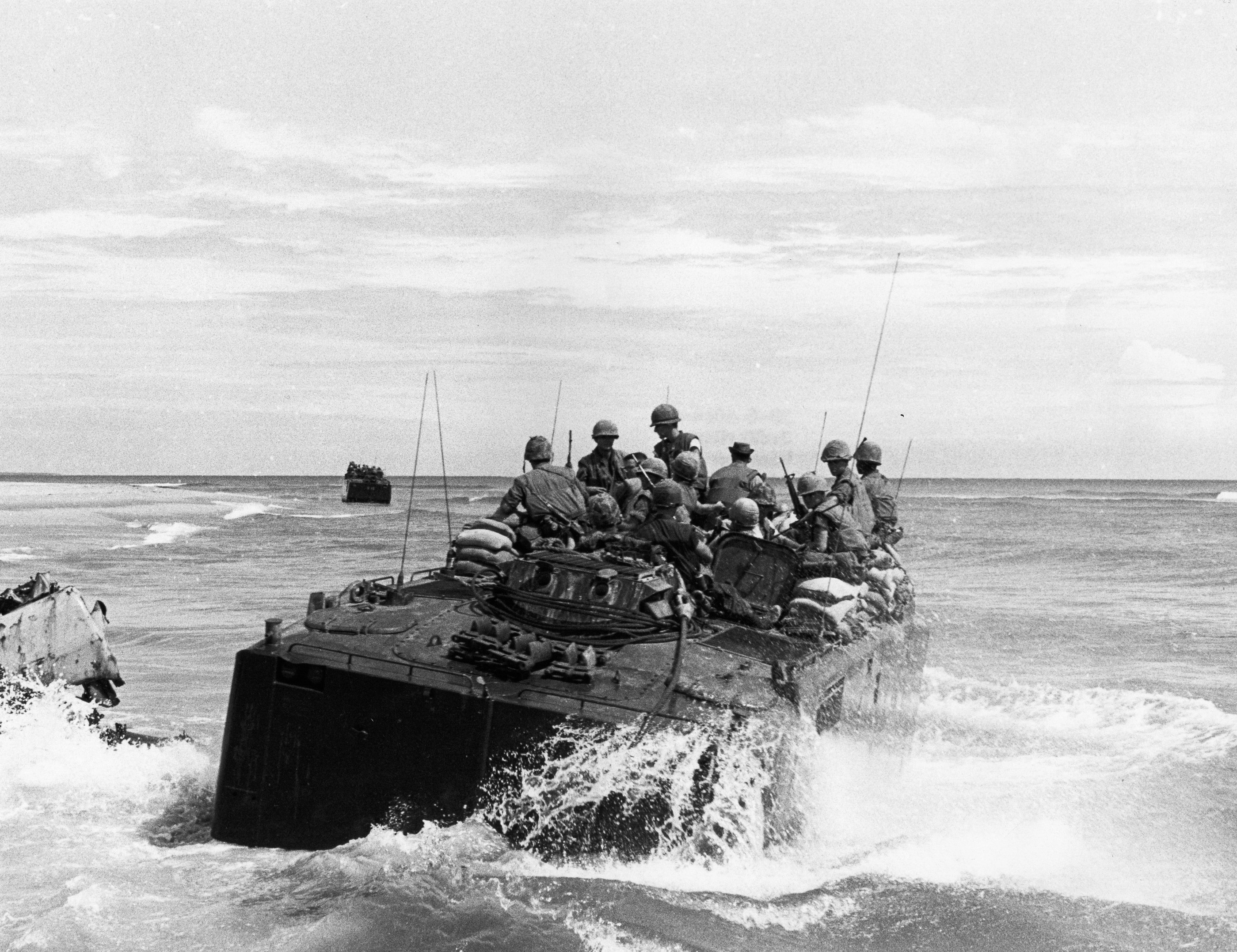
Marine Amtrac on the Cửa Việt River during Operation Napoleon/Saline

Operation Napoleon/Saline was a 3rd Marine Division, U.S. Army and ARVN 1st Division operation along the Cửa Việt River south of the DMZ. The operation resulted in 3,500+ PAVN and 395 U.S./ARVN killed.

== December ==
1 December - 8 January 1968

Operation Klamath Falls was conducted by the 2nd Battalion, 7th Cavalry Regiment and the 1st Brigade, 101st Airborne Division along the border between Bình Thuận and Lâm Đồng Provinces. The operation resulted in 156 PAVN/VC killed and eight captured and 25 U.S. killed.

3 December

The A-7 Corsair II made its combat debut flying from the USS Ranger.

4 December

The U.S. Department of State sent a diplomatic note to Prince Sihanouk, pledging that the U.S. would not cross into Cambodia to pursue PAVN/VC forces fleeing from South Vietnam, and promising to respect "Cambodian neutrality, sovereignty, independence and territorial integrity."

4 December – 17 February 1968

Operation Manchester was a security operation conducted by the U.S. 199th Infantry Brigade in Tân Uyên District. The operation resulted in 456 VC and 37 U.S. killed.

5 December

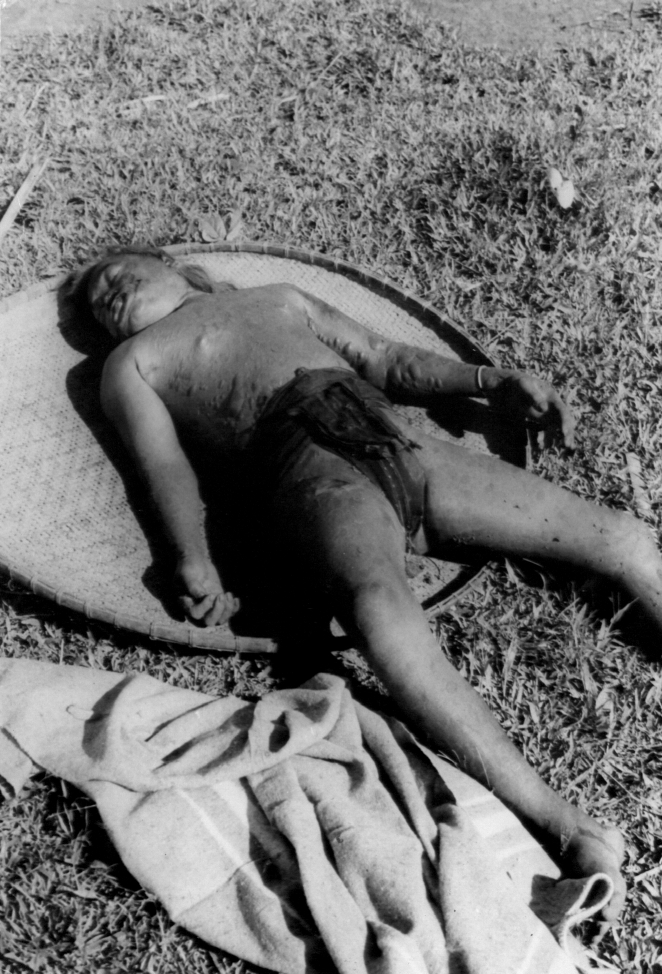
A victim of the Đắk Sơn massacre

In the Đắk Sơn massacre two VC battalions attacked Đắk Sơn village and killed 114 to 252 Montagnard villagers.

Republican senators Everett Dirksen and Gerald Ford declared that Johnson had done everything possible to negotiate peace.

6–20 December

The Battle of Tam Quan was a two-week battle fought when the U.S. 1st Brigade, 1st Cavalry Division and 1st Battalion, 50th Infantry Regiment disrupted the PAVN 22nd Regiment, which was in the process of preparing to conduct a major attack on ARVN installations at Tam Quan. The battle resulted in 650+ PAVN killed and 31 captured and 58 U.S. and 31 ARVN killed.

8 December

ARVN forces trapped two VC battalions in the Mekong Delta at the Kinh O Mon Canal in Chuong Thien Province and killed 365 VC for the loss of 67 ARVN.

The VC 3rd Battalion, 273rd Regiment, attacked of the 1st Battalion, 2nd Infantry Regiment and Battery B, 1st Battalion, 5th Artillery couth of Bo Duc. The attack resulted in 49 VC and four U.S. killed.

8 December – 24 February 1968

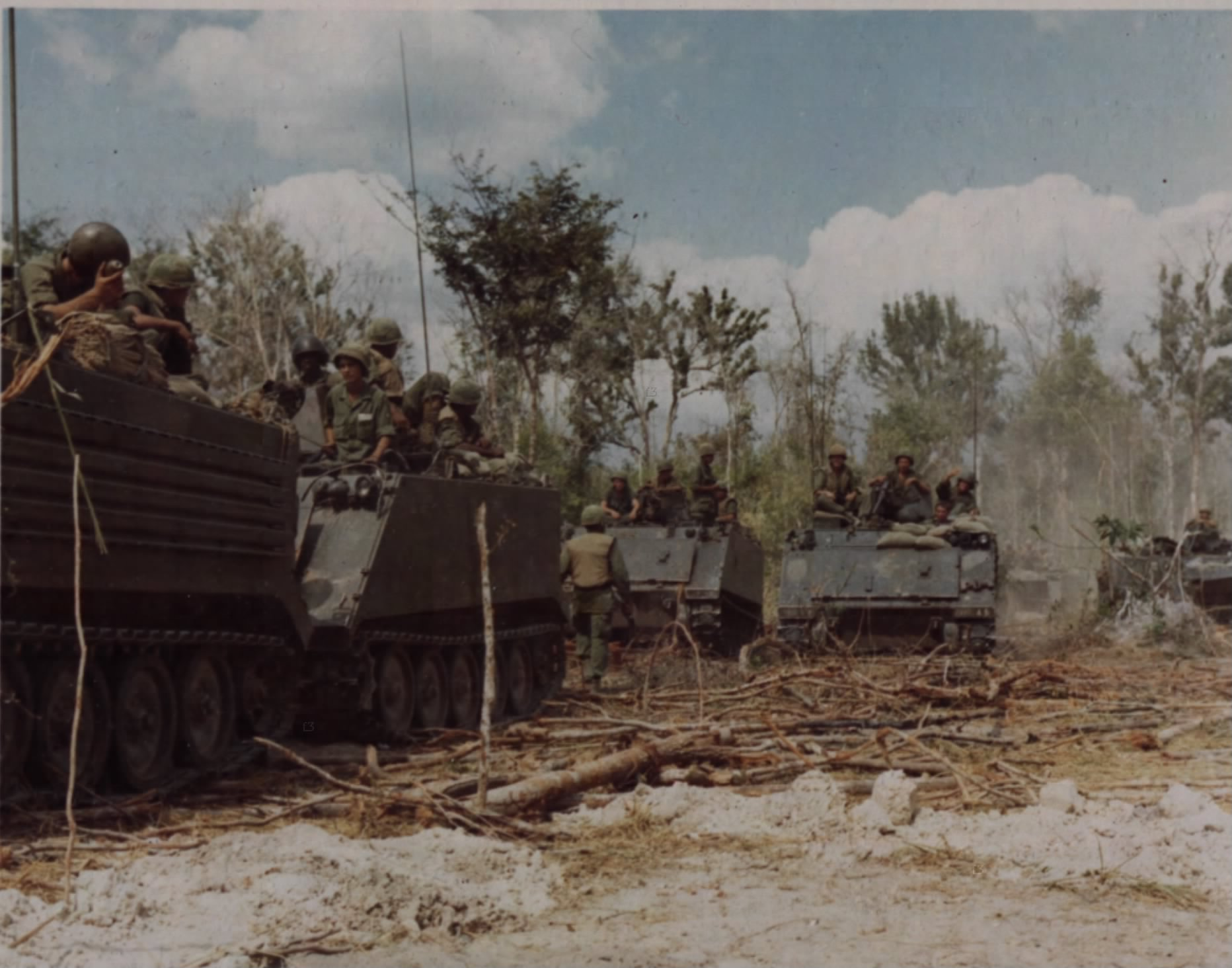
M113s during Operation Yellowstone

Operation Yellowstone was a security operation conducted by the 1st and 3rd Brigades, 25th Infantry Division in northeast Tây Ninh Province. The operation resulted in 1,254 PAVN/VC and 81 U.S. killed.

8 December – 11 March 1968

Operation Saratoga was a search and destroy operation conducted by the 2nd Brigade, 25th Infantry Division in northeastern Hậu Nghĩa, southern Tây Ninh and western Bình Dương Provinces. The operation resulted in 2,043 PAVN/VC killed and 139 captured and 275 U.S. killed.

14 December

Bui Quang San, a member of South Vietnam's lower house, was gunned down in his home near Saigon. Two days before his death, San told friends of receiving a letter from the VC threatening his life. His mother, first wife and six children were killed in an earlier VC raid in Hội An. Saigon reported a total of 232 civilians killed by acts of terrorism in one week.

15 December

The South Vietnamese government announced that they and their allies would observe a 24-hours stand-down during Christmas Day; this would be followed by second cease-fire between December 31 and January 2. During the 24-hour Christmas ceasefire aerial photographs would later show that 1,300 trucks would be sent from North Vietnam to resupply PAVN/VC forces in the south.

With the conclusion of Operation Fairfax the defense of Saigon was transferred to the ARVN.

17 December - 31 January 1968

Operation Maeng Ho IX was a search and destroy operation by the ROK Capital Division in Bình Định Province. the operation resulted in 749 PAVN/VC killed.

17 December - 8 March 1968

Operation Uniontown was a security operation conducted by the 199th Infantry Brigade, 3rd Brigade, 101st Airborne Division and 11th Armored Cavalry Regiment in Biên Hòa and Gia Định Provinces. The operation resulted in 922 PAVN/VC and 76 U.S. killed.

18 December

Operation Eagle Thrust, "the largest and longest military airlift ever attempted into a combat zone", was completed as the last of 10,024 troops from the U.S. 101st Airborne Division arrived at the Bien Hoa Air Base. Bringing the troops had required 369 C-141 and 22 C-133 aircraft to fly from Fort Campbell, Kentucky.

JCS Chairman General Earle Wheeler declared that "we are winning the war" but warned of the possibility of a Battle of the Bulge type action by the PAVN/VC.

Retired Commandant of the Marine Corps David M. Shoup derided justifications that it was necessary to fight in South Vietnam otherwise the Communists would invade the United States as "pure poppycock" saying the war amounted to a civil conflict between "those crooks in Saigon" and nationalists seeking a better life.

18 December – 10 June 1968

Operation Muscatine was a security operation conducted by the 3rd Brigade, 4th Infantry Division and the 23rd Infantry Division in Quảng Ngãi Province. The operation resulted in 645+ VC killed and seven captured and 25 U.S. killed.

20-21 December

A reinforced battalion from the 274th Regiment attacked a night position held by a company of the Royal Thai Army Volunteer Regiment. The outnumbered Thai soldiers fought off the assault that lasted several hours, killing 68 VC while losing six killed.

21 December

Johnson, attending memorial services for Australian Prime Minister Harold Holt in Canberra, warned the Australian cabinet that "kamikaze" attacks were coming in South Vietnam.

23 December

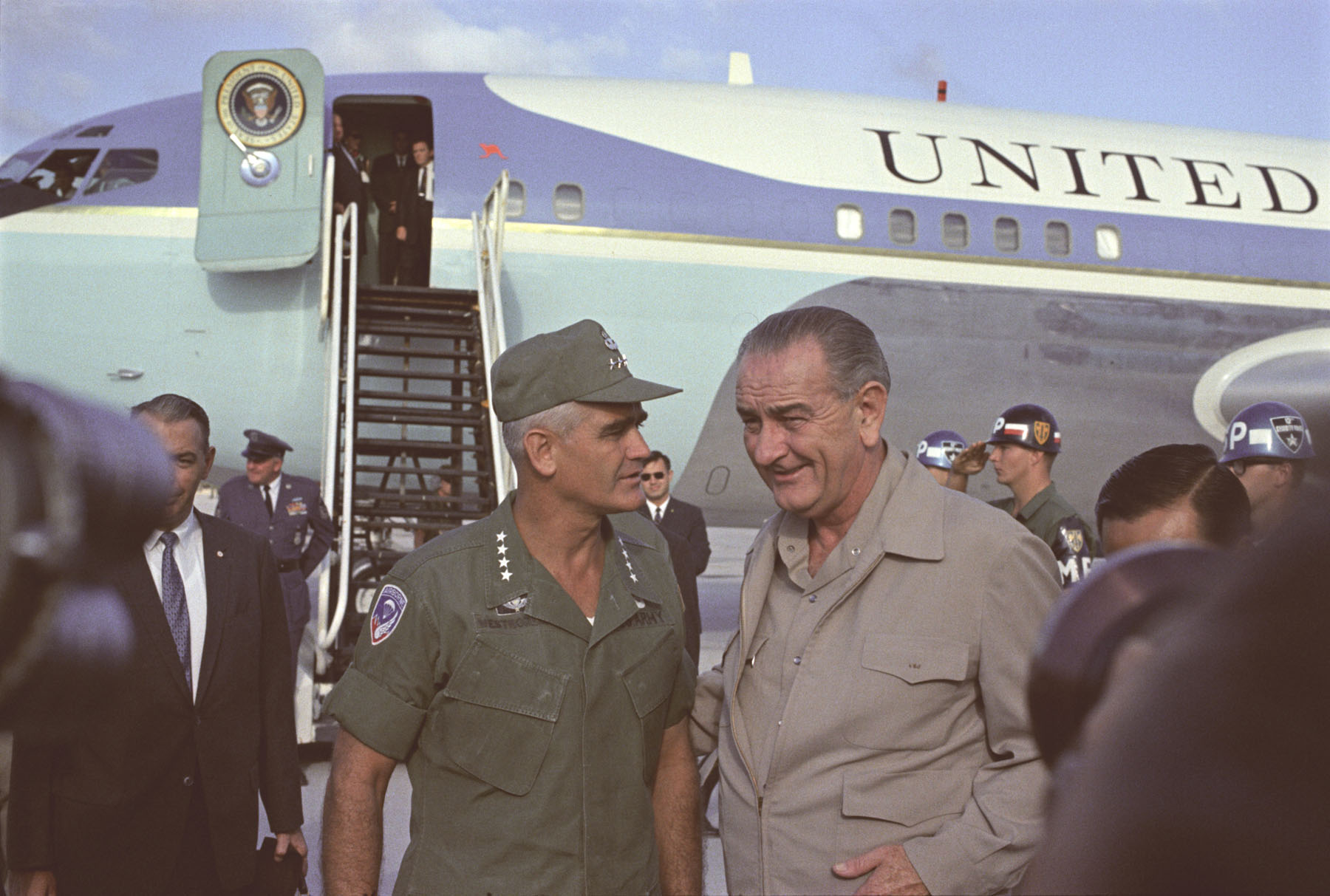
General Westmoreland and President Johnson at Cam Ranh Base

President Johnson made an unannounced Christmas visit to American troops in South Vietnam, stopping at the Cam Ranh Base at 08:40 local time on his way back from Australia. Johnson was greeted by General Westmoreland and his deputy, General Creighton W. Abrams and Ambassador Ellsworth Bunker. He then conferred briefly with 30 of Westmoreland's field commanders before addressing 2,450 American troops. In a tour of the base hospital, Johnson shook hands with patients and personally presented Purple Heart medals to some of the wounded, then departed at 10:25.

24–5 December

At 18:00 a 24-hour ceasefire went into effect and the United States halted aerial bombing and other offensive operations. The VC had announced a 72-hour ceasefire starting at 01:00 on 24 December, but U.S. command noted 56 incidents of gunfire in the first 12 hours, with one American soldier wounded near An Khe and seven PAVN/VC killed. After a ceasefire that lasted for most of Christmas Day, U.S. warplanes resumed bombing operations at 18:00 over North Vietnam, as well as on convoys that were moving supplies to the PAVN/VC.

During the bombing halt, a representative of the North Vietnamese Politburo addressed PAVN/VC leadership in Thua Thien Province near Huế about the go-ahead for what would become known as the Tet Offensive.

26 December

In a report in The New York Times by Hanson W. Baldwin titled "Vietnam Report: Foe seeks to sway U.S. public" he stated that nearly all U.S. officials in Saigon believed that "the main battleground in 1968 will be the United States" and that the current PAVN/VC winter-spring offensive was designed to strengthen "opposition to the war in the United States and influenc[e] American and world opinion during a Presidential election year" and to "prove to Saigon...the American public...and the world that the Vietcong and North Vietnamese are still strong and can strike at will."

26-7 December

The ARVN 1st Division engaged the VC 416th Battalion on the coast just south of the DMZ killing 203 VC for the loss of 15 killed.

26 December – 2 January 1968

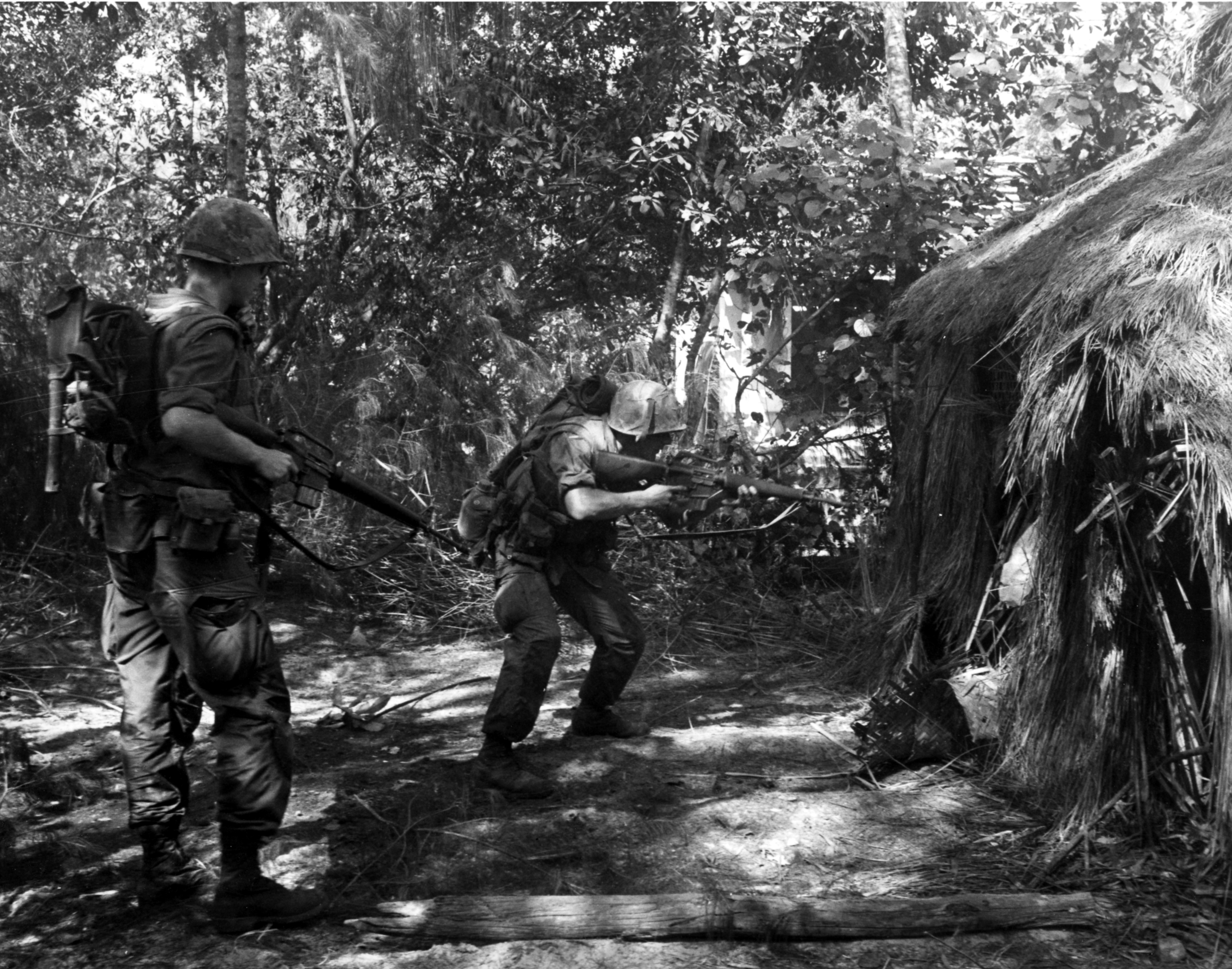
Marines search a hut during Operation Badger Tooth

Operation Badger Tooth was a search and destroy operation conducted by the 3rd Battalion, 1st Marines in the Street Without Joy area of Quảng Trị Province. The operation resulted in 131 PAVN and 48 Marines killed.

28 December

Sihanouk gave limited permission for U.S. forces to cross from South Vietnam into Cambodia in order to pursue PAVN/VC.

The 173rd Airborne Brigade made a helicopter assault on PAVN/VC positions 24 miles (39 km) northwest of Tuy Hòa killing 31 PAVN for the loss of 12 U.S. killed.

28 December – 3 January 1968

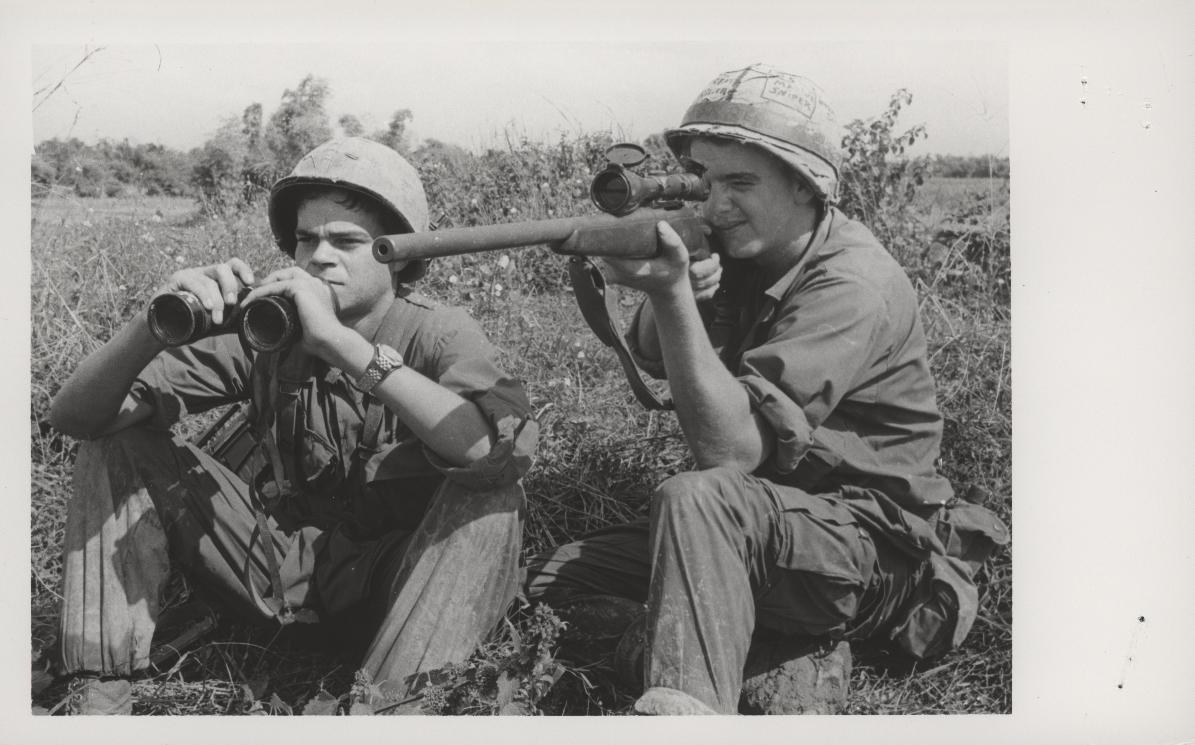
Marine sniper team during Operation Auburn

Operation Auburn was a security operation conducted by the 1st Marine Division on Go Noi Island, Quảng Nam Province. The operation resulted in 37 VC and 23 Marines killed.

30 December

North Vietnam's Foreign Minister, Nguyen Duy Trinh, stated that his nation would open peace discussions as soon as the U.S. halted bombing. Thieu stated that he "saw no real change" in the North Vietnamese Foreign Minister's formulation for peace, while U.S. Secretary of State Dean Rusk questioned the sincerity of the Hanoi regime, in light of the fact that the North Vietnamese had ordered an offensive for the winter season and had already violated the holiday truces. Former U.S. President Dwight Eisenhower later warned President Johnson that "we must not put ourselves in the position of depending upon belief in what a Communist says."

== Year in numbers ==
Armed Force	Strength	KIA	Reference	Military costs—1967	Military costs	Reference
South Vietnam	643,000	12,716
United States	485,600	11,363
South Korea	47,829
Thailand	2,205
Australia	6,818
Philippines	2,020
New Zealand	534
Vietnam	278,000	140,000 (casualties)	US Source Estimate
China	170,000

== See also ==
List of allied military operations of the Vietnam War (1967)
