= General Davison =

General Davison may refer to:

- Donald Angus Davison (1892–1944), U.S. Army major general
- Frederic E. Davison (1917–1999), U.S. Army major general
- Michael S. Davison (1917–2006), U.S. Army four-star general
- Michael S. Davison Jr. (born 1941), U.S. Army lieutenant general
- Peter Weimer Davison (1869–1920), U.S. Army brigadier general
