= 1991 United States Senate special election in Pennsylvania =

- November 5, 1991
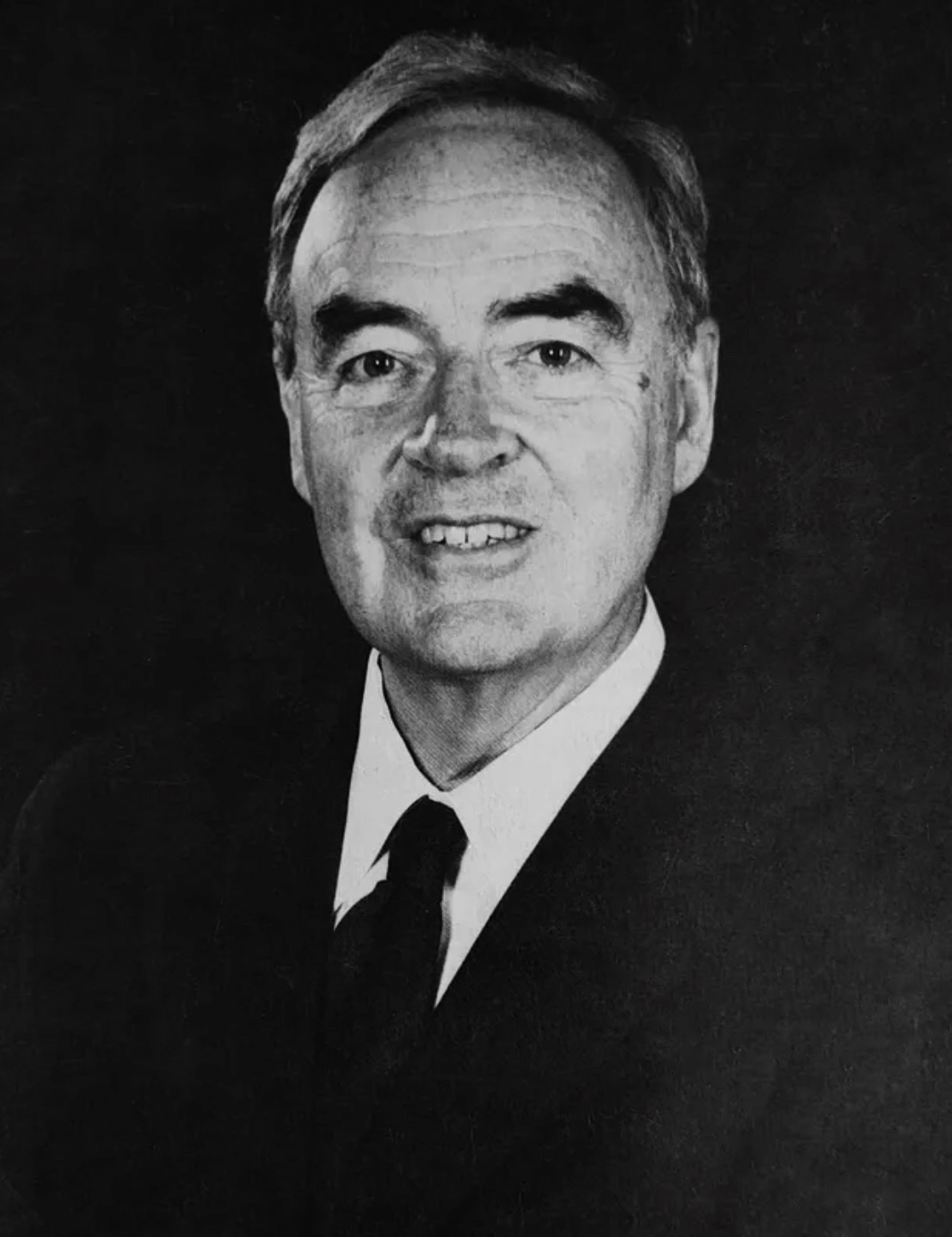

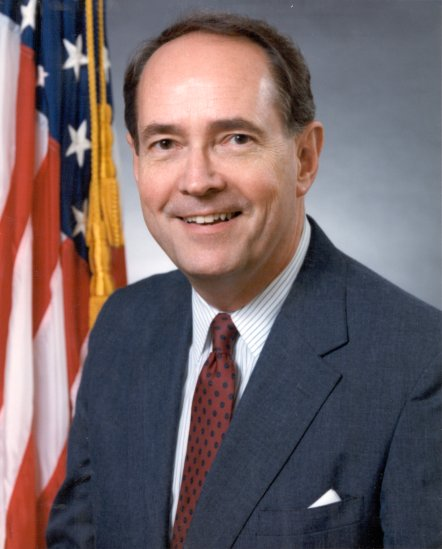
Nominee	Harris Wofford	Dick Thornburgh
Party	Democratic	Republican
Popular vote	1,860,760	1,521,986
Percentage	55.01%	44.99%
- County results Wofford: 50–60% 60–70% 70–80% Thornburgh: 50–60% 60–70%
U.S. senator before election
Harris Wofford
Democratic
Elected U.S. Senator
Harris Wofford
Democratic

The 1991 United States Senate special election in Pennsylvania was held on November 5, 1991, after incumbent Republican senator John Heinz died in a plane crash on April 4. Harris Wofford was appointed to the seat by Pennsylvania governor Bob Casey and won the general election by 10 percentage points over U.S. attorney general and former governor Dick Thornburgh.

Major-party candidates for this election were chosen by party committees, as the vacancy had happened too late for a primary to be held. The Democratic nomination was predetermined by Casey's choice of Wofford on May 8, which he settled on after more prominent candidates such as Thomas W. Kelly and Lee Iacocca publicly declined. Thornburgh announced that he would accept the Republican nomination on June 4, though he did not resign as attorney general in order to begin campaigning until August.

Wofford became Pennsylvania's first Democratic senator since Joseph S. Clark, Jr. left office in 1969. This was the first time a Democrat won this seat since 1940.

== Background ==
=== Death of Senator John Heinz ===
On April 4, 1991, United States senator John Heinz was killed when his Piper Aerostar propeller-driven aircraft collided in mid-air with a Bell 412 helicopter over Merion Elementary School in Lower Merion Township, a suburb northwest of Philadelphia. All five people in both aircraft were killed. Two school children on the ground were also killed by falling debris.

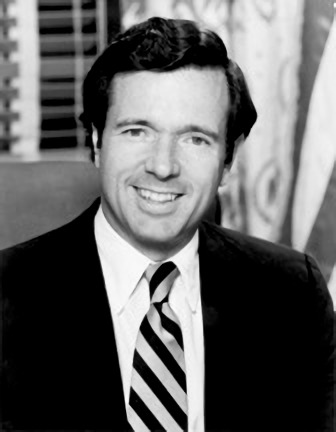
Senator John Heinz

Pennsylvania governor Bob Casey memorialized Heinz as "a distinguished and dedicated son of Pennsylvania." Heinz had been re-elected to his third term in the Senate in 1988 and the term was not set to expire until 1995. Governor Casey was empowered to appoint an interim Senator to fill the vacant seat until a successor could be duly elected in November, as required by statute. In the immediate aftermath of the Senator's death, Casey declined to name any potential replacement, though it was expected Casey would pick the state's first Democratic senator since 1968.

Because Heinz's death came in April, it was too late for primaries to determine the party nominees for the special election. Instead, the state party committees would determine the nominees for the special election.

== Appointment and Democratic nomination ==
=== Candidates ===
==== Appointee ====
- Harris Wofford, Pennsylvania secretary of labor and industry

==== Declined appointment ====
- Lee Iacocca, CEO of Chrysler
- Thomas W. Kelly, retired U.S. Army lieutenant general

==== Considered for appointment ====
- Bob Casey, governor of Pennsylvania
- Kate Ford Elliott, judge of the Superior Court of Pennsylvania
- William H. Gray III, U.S. representative from Philadelphia and House majority whip
- William J. Green III, former mayor of Philadelphia
- John Murtha, U.S. representative from Johnstown
- Art Rooney II, Pittsburgh attorney and owner of the Pittsburgh Steelers
- Mark Singel, lieutenant governor of Pennsylvania

=== Selection process ===
Without an open popular vote for the nomination, Casey's appointment would almost certainly determine the Democratic nominee for the November election.

One prominent candidate who received speculation was lieutenant governor Mark Singel, who had been preparing to run against Arlen Specter in 1992. However, a problem was that Republican Senate president Robert Jubelirer, would ascend to replace Singel. Casey would eventually rule out a Singel appointment publicly, in addition to declining any plans to nominate himself.

Casey offered the seat to lieutenant general Thomas W. Kelly, who had retired from active duty in April and was the public face of the Gulf War as head of the National Military Command Center. Kelly, who was born and raised in Philadelphia but no longer lived in Pennsylvania, declined. In early May, Casey also privately offered the seat to Chrysler executive Lee Iacocca, who had elevated his political profile by criticism of President George H. W. Bush's industrial policy, with the understanding that Iacocca would immediately begin running for the special election for the remainder of Heinz's term. Although Iacocca was a native of Allentown, he lived in the Michigan suburbs and would have had to relocate to Pennsylvania before November to stand for election. On May 6, Iacocca publicly declined the offer of appointment, citing his family and corporate obligations.

After Iacocca declined Casey's offer, the Governor came under extensive criticism from Republicans for the lengthy time he took to choose an appointee and his attempts to appoint non-residents; both Republicans and Democrats agreed that his primary focus was finding the strongest political candidate to take on Thornburgh, the likely Republican nominee.

After Iacocca's public withdrawal, former Philadelphia mayor Bill Green III was considered the front-runner and a Casey aide confirmed that Green was under consideration. U.S. representatives William H. Gray and John Murtha, Pittsburgh lawyer Art Rooney II, and Superior Court judge Kate Ford Elliott were also mentioned as potential appointments.

On May 8, Casey settled on Pennsylvania secretary of labor and industry Harris Wofford as Heinz's successor. Wofford had previously served as an advisor to President John F. Kennedy and the president of Bryn Mawr College, as well as Casey's law partner. Casey's aides said that Wofford had been a contender since Heinz's death. Wofford was sworn in that day and immediately announced that he would be a candidate in the special election.

== Republican nomination ==
=== Candidates ===
- Dick Thornburgh, U.S. attorney general and former governor of Pennsylvania

==== Declined ====
- Stephen Freind, state representative from Delaware County
- Teresa Heinz, widow of John Heinz
- Tom Ridge, U.S. representative from Erie

=== Campaign ===
After Heinz's death, the Republican Party initially scheduled a statewide meeting for May 11 to choose their nominee, subject to the result of a series of regional caucuses. The initial candidate of choice was Heinz's widow Teresa, though she declined on April 23, citing a desire to continue the healing process and remain committed to her family. The next leading candidate was U.S. attorney general Dick Thornburgh. Parallel to Casey's struggle to find a willing appointee, Republicans struggled to get Thornburgh into the race. By the end of April, Thornburgh had not announced his intent, and at least one regional caucus was postponed. U.S. representative Tom Ridge announced that he would run if and only if Thornburgh declined.

Thornburgh confirmed he would run on June 4, but at the behest of the White House, the meeting to officially nominate him was delayed again, from June to August, allowing Thornburgh to continue serving as attorney general for two more months.

== General election ==
=== Candidates ===
- Harris Wofford, incumbent U.S. senator and former Pennsylvania secretary of labor (Democratic)
- Dick Thornburgh, U.S. attorney general and former governor of Pennsylvania (Republican)

=== Campaign ===
At the time of Wofford's appointment, some speculated his liberal credentials could cause problems in a state that had not elected a Democrat to the Senate since 1962, but Democratic operative Paul Tully argued that his liberalism would be advantageous in the Philadelphia suburbs, which were key to any statewide win.

As little as five months before the election, Wofford's own internal polling showed him trailing Thornburgh by upwards of 40 points. Both the state and national Democratic establishment were tepid toward Wofford, feeling that Casey had missed a prime opportunity to select a top tier candidate. Wofford struggled to fundraise and had difficulty communicating his message to the voters; because he had a bureaucratic as opposed to a political background, he was long-winded and received criticism in the media. With a large lead in the polls, Thornburgh laid back to avoid mistakes, which allowed Wofford to gain traction. Despite his elite upbringing, Wofford connected well with working class voters by making healthcare access the major plank of his campaign. He also successfully hit Thornburgh for his connections to President George H. W. Bush, whose popularity was steeply declining due to a growing recession. Thornburgh was unable to mount credible attacks against Wofford until after the Democrat had already established himself.

There was widespread speculation that Thornburgh had struck a deal with Democratic congressman and House majority whip William H. Gray. Gray had been the subject of an investigation into alleged campaign finance irregularities and a grand jury investigation into his church's financial affairs. It was reported that Gray would not run in the special election, and in return Thornburgh would drop the investigation of him. Gray did not run in the election, and in fact resigned from Congress two months prior to it, in order to take a job as president and CEO of the United Negro College Fund. Thornburgh went on to lose by 338,774 votes to Wofford.

=== Results ===
1991 U.S. Senate election in Pennsylvania
Party	Candidate	Votes	%	±%
Democratic	Harris Wofford (incumbent)	1,860,760	55.01%	▲22.56
Republican	Dick Thornburgh	1,521,986	44.99%	▼21.46
Majority		338,774	10.01%	−23.99%
Total votes		3,382,746	100.00%	
Democratic hold				

Wofford was not only victorious in traditionally Democratic areas, such as Philadelphia, Scranton, and metro Pittsburgh, but he also ran well in Republican strongholds. Wofford won three of the four suburban Philadelphia counties, which, although socially liberal, were strongly aligned with Republicans; Wofford's "roll-up-your-sleeves" campaign also allowed him to perform stronger than most Democrats in rural regions and to win several usually Republican counties with a strong labor base.

As of 2024, this is the last Senate election where Crawford County and Northumberland County voted Democratic.

== Aftermath ==
Wofford's appointment and election increased the Democratic Senate majority to 57 seats, diminishing Republican hopes of taking back the Senate in 1992.

Wofford's victory proved to be a harbinger for Bill Clinton's victory in the presidential election held a year later. Wofford's campaign was run by Paul Begala and James Carville, who would go on to play key roles in the Clinton campaign. Democrats did very well across the state including in Allegheny County (Pittsburgh) and Philadelphia County (Philadelphia). The Los Angeles Times described Wofford's victory and as the "Pennsylvania miracle" and later noted in December 1991 that many Democratic presidential candidates now wanted Carville and his partner Paul Begala to be involved in their campaigns.

== See also ==
- 1990 United States Senate elections
- 1992 United States Senate elections
