= General Blanchard =

General Blanchard may refer to:

- Albert G. Blanchard (1810–1891), Confederate States Army brigadier general
- Georges Maurice Jean Blanchard (1877–1954), French Army general
- George S. Blanchard (1920–2006), U.S. Army four-star general
- William H. Blanchard (1916–1966), U.S. Air Force four-star general
