= Operation McLain =

Part of the Vietnam War (1968–1969)

- Part of Vietnam War
Date	20 January 1968 – 31 January 1969
Location	Bình Thuận Province, South Vietnam
Result	Allied operational success

Belligerents
United States; South Vietnam	Viet Cong

Commanders and leaders
(United States) John R. D. Cleland (South Vietnam) Nguyen Ba Thinh	

Units involved
(United States) 3rd Battalion, 506th Infantry Regiment (South Vietnam) 44th Regiment	482nd Local Force Battalion; 840th Main Force Battalion

Casualties and losses
(United States) 69 killed	US body count 1,042 killed 333 individual and 40 crew-served weapons recovered

Operation McLain (also known as Operation Dan Thang) was a security operation conducted during the Vietnam War by the U.S. Army's 3rd Battalion, 506th Infantry Regiment, 101st Airborne Division and the Army of the Republic of Vietnam (ARVN) 44th Regiment, 23rd Division in Bình Thuận Province, South Vietnam from 20 January 1968 to 31 January 1969.

== Background ==
The operation was a continuation of Operation Byrd. Rural security had declined significantly after the Tet Offensive, as much from the South Vietnamese government's withdrawal to the towns and subsequent passivity as from enemy action. Modest gains began to accrue in April when, goaded by MACV and I Field Force, Vietnam headquarters, the South Vietnamese finally began to go onto the offensive. The men of the 3rd Battalion assisted in the rejuvenation by conducting low-level combined operations with government forces and by training a Regional Forces (RF) intelligence squad as a long-range reconnaissance patrol. Still, the allied forces rarely caught sight of the enemy, as the commander of Military Region 6, General Chau, reverted to his traditional strategy of attacking lines of communications and isolated outposts, and withdrew his main units, the Vietcong (VC) 840th Main Force Battalion and 482nd Local Force Battalion, into the interior hills to rest until orders came for a second general offensive.

== Operation ==
On 20 April at 17:45 a company from the Battalion found mass graves containing 19 VC dead 12 miles (19 km) northwest of Phan Thiết. Cumulative operational results to the end of April were 556 PAVN/VC killed and 87 individual and 12 crew-served weapons captured. U.S. losses were 25 killed.

On 31 May RF units and armor and infantry from the Battalion engaged an entrenched 30-35 man VC force 3 miles (4.8 km) north-northeast of Phan Thiết killing 17. The VC were identified as being from the 482nd Local Force Battalion.

On 8 June, I Field Force commander Major General William R. Peers ordered the commander of Task Force South, Lieutenant colonel John R. D. Cleland, to suspend the operation so that the 3/506th Infantry, the 192nd Assault Helicopter Company and a pair of 105mm howitzer batteries could move to Da Lat to search for the VC 186th Battalion in Operation Banjo Royce.

On 1 July, Operation McLain resumed with the 3/506th Infantry operating from Landing Zone Betty near Phan Thiết. ARVN General Lữ Mộng Lan also took steps to improve the situation, replacing the inept commander of the 44th Regiment with a proven leader, Lt. Col. Nguyen Ba Thinh. Lan gave Colonel Thinh three new battalion commanders. On 17 July the 2nd Battalion discovered the 840th Main Force Battalion and the 450th Local Force Company in fortifications ten kilometers northeast of Phan Thiết. Thinh committed his remaining maneuver unit, the 3rd Battalion, 44th Infantry, while Cleland sent in several companies from the 3/506th Infantry, and helicopter gunships from Troop B, 1st Squadron, 17th Cavalry Regiment. Backed by the strong U.S. force, Thinh's men drove the VC from their bunkers in a two-day battle. According to a prisoner, 68 VC died. Allied losses totalled 15 ARVN and two U.S.

On 23 July a unit of the 1st Brigade found 15 VC graves 7 miles (11 km) west-southwest of Phan Thiết. Cumulative operational results to the end of July were 648 VC killed and 157 individual and 27 crew-served weapons captured. U.S. losses were 34 killed.

On 21 August an ARVN force and a Battalion unit repulsed an attack on Di Linh killing 43 VC and capturing 12 individual and three crew-served weapons; U.S. losses were three killed. Cumulative operational results to the end of August were 774 VC killed and 201 individual and 28 crew-served weapons captured. U.S. losses were 46 killed.

On 22 October at 03:00 a Brigade unit supported by tanks engaged a VC force near their night defensive position 10 miles (16 km) northeast of Phan Thiết. The unit was supported by fire from helicopter gunships and an AC-47 Spooky gunship. The VC withdrew at 04:10 leaving 11 dead and six individual and two crew-served weapons; U.S. losses were one killed. Cumulative operational results to the end of October were 851 VC killed and 231 individual and 30 crew-served weapons captured. U.S. losses were 54 killed.

== Aftermath ==
The operation concluded on 31 January 1969. VC losses were 1,042 killed and 333 individual and 40 crew-served weapons captured. U.S. losses were 69 killed.
