= William M. Wherry =

United States Army Medal of Honor recipient

William Mackey Wherry
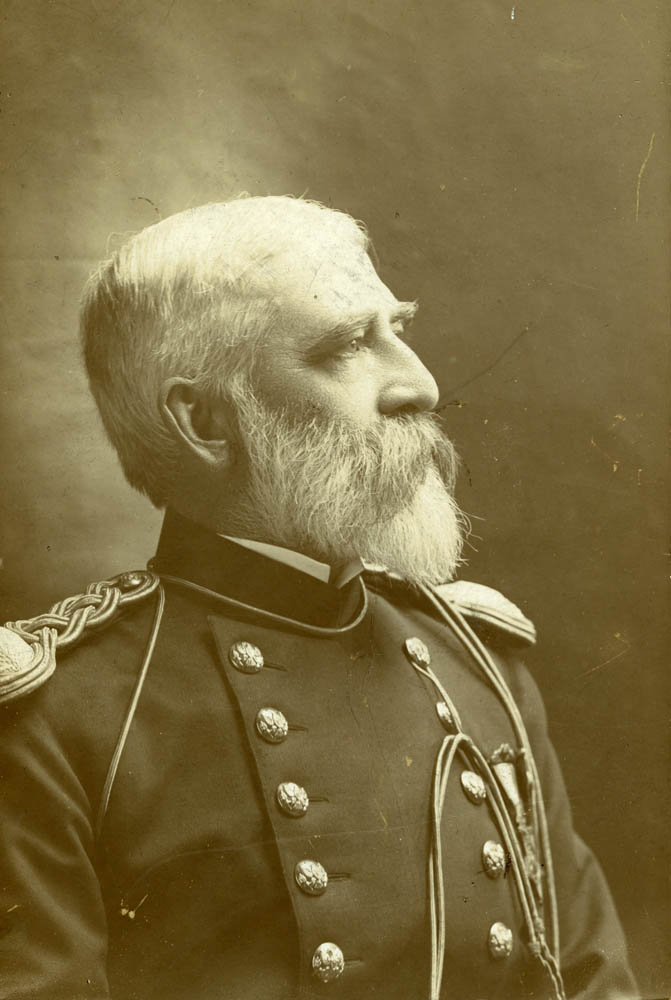
- Born: September 13, 1836; St. Louis, Missouri, U.S.
- Died: November 3, 1918 (aged 82); Cincinnati, Ohio, U.S.
- Burial place: Bellefontaine Cemetery, St. Louis, Missouri, U.S.
- Military career
- Allegiance: United States (Union)
- Branch: United States Army
- Service years: 1861–1899
- Rank: Brigadier General
- Unit: 3rd Missouri Volunteer Infantry
- Commands: 2nd Infantry Regiment; 17th Infantry Regiment
- Conflicts: American Civil War; Spanish–American War
- Awards: Medal of Honor

William Mackey Wherry (September 13, 1836 – November 3, 1918) was an American brigadier general, author and recipient of the Medal of Honor.

== Biography ==
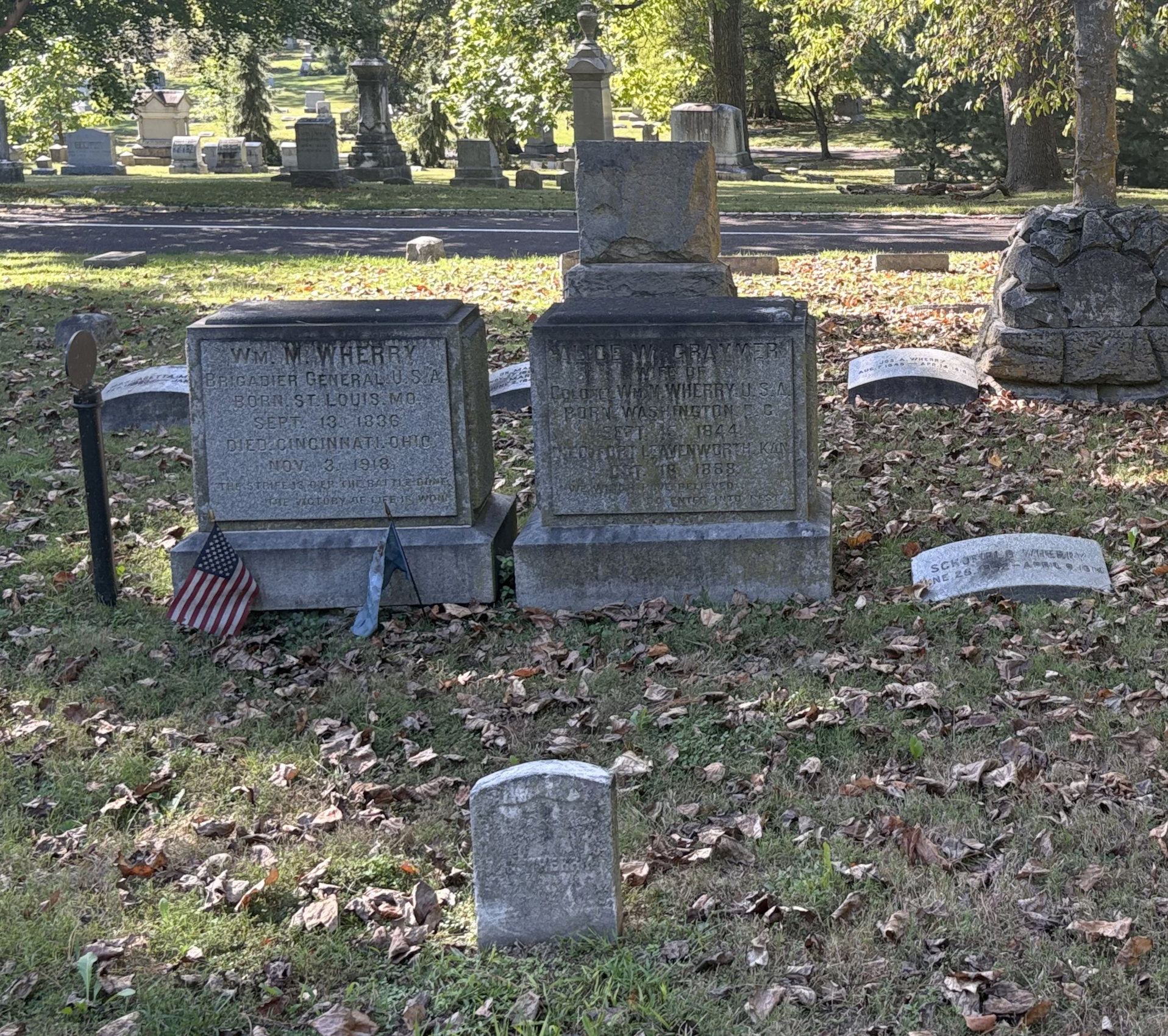
Wherry's grave at Bellefontaine Cemetery

Wherry was born in St. Louis, Missouri. He served on the frontier against the Indians and during the Spanish–American War. Wherry retired at the rank of brigadier general in the United States Army. Wherry is the author of Lyon's Campaign in Missouri.

While serving in the American Civil War, as a first lieutenant of Company D, 3rd Missouri Volunteer Infantry and aide-de-camp to Nathaniel Lyon. Wherry received the Medal of Honor for actions at the Battle of Wilson's Creek on August 10, 1861. Wherry's Medal of Honor was issued after the war on October 30, 1895, with the citation "Displayed conspicuous coolness and heroism in rallying troops that were recoiling under heavy fire".

After the Civil War, Wherry served as a brevet colonel while assigned to Headquarters First Military District in Richmond, Virginia.

Wherry was promoted to lieutenant colonel, 2nd United States Infantry on 29 December 1894. At the onset of the Spanish–American War, he took command of the 22nd Infantry when regimental commander, Colonel John C. Bates, was promoted to brigadier general of an independent brigade consisting of the 3rd Infantry Regiment and 20th Infantry Regiment. He commanded the regiment until he was promoted to colonel of the 8th Infantry on 30 August 1898. He was transferred to the 17th Infantry the following month.

Wherry was appointed brigadier general of volunteers September 21, 1898, and discharged from the volunteers on November 30, 1898. Wherry was appointed brigadier general in the Regular Army on January 7, 1899, and retired on January 18, 1899.

Wherry was a companion of the Ohio Commandery of the Military Order of the Loyal Legion of the United States.

Wherry died on November 3, 1918, in Cincinnati, Ohio, and was buried at Bellefontaine Cemetery in St. Louis.

== Family ==
In 1868, Wherry married Alice Grammer of Baltimore. They were the parents of seven children, including Harriet "Rita" Schofield Wherry, who was the wife of General John L. Hines, mother of Colonel John L. Hines Jr., and grandmother of John R. D. Cleland.

== See also ==
- List of Medal of Honor recipients
