= Firebase Betty =

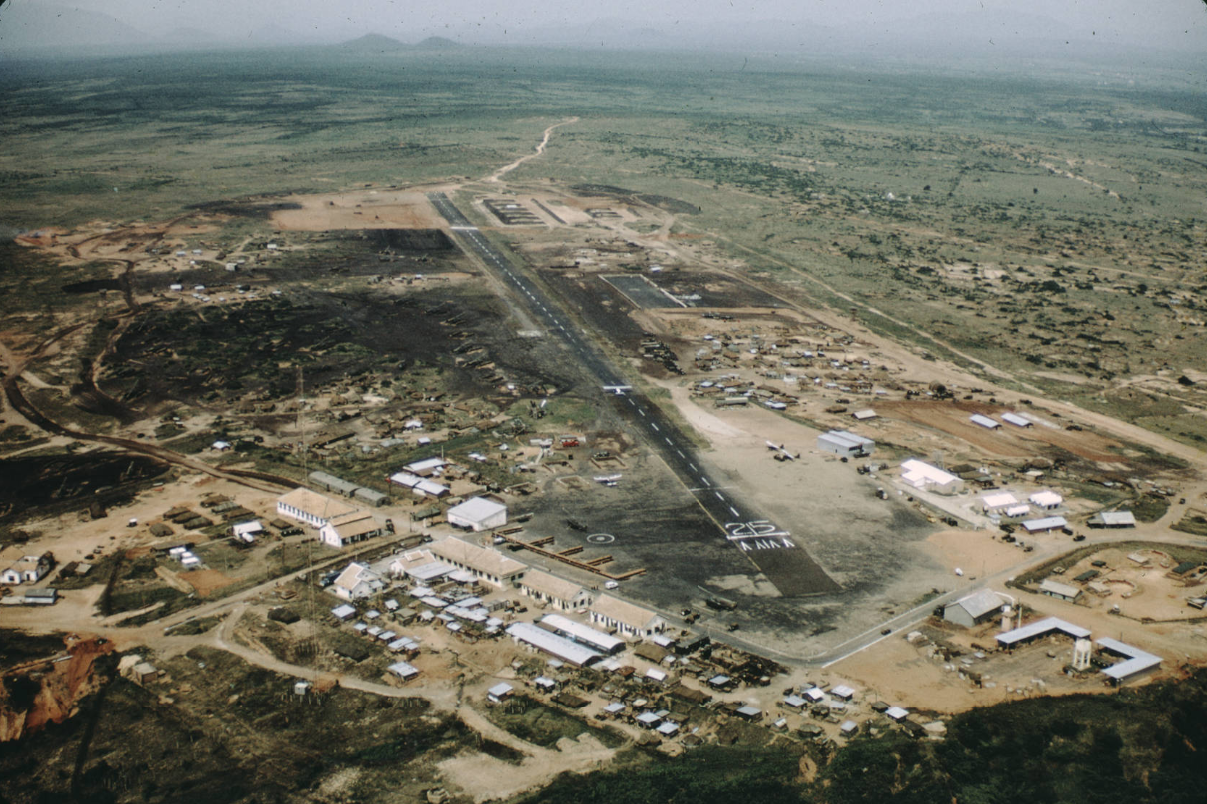
- 21 September 1967

Site information
- Type: Army
- Condition: abandoned

Location
- Coordinates: 10.908°N 108.074°E

Site history
- Built: 1966
- In use: 1966-75
- Battles/wars: Vietnam War

Garrison information
- Occupants: 1st Battalion, 7th Cavalry; 3rd Battalion, 506th Infantry; 1st Battalion, 50th Infantry

Phan Thiết
- IATA: none; ICAO: none

Summary

Runways
Direction	Length		Surface
Direction	ft	m	Surface
07/25	3,600	1,097	asphalt

Firebase Betty (also known as Currahee Base Camp, Landing Zone Betty or Phan Thiết) is a former U.S. Army and Army of the Republic of Vietnam (ARVN) firebase south of Phan Thiết in Bình Thuận Province, southern Vietnam.

== History ==
The base was established at the French-era Phan Thiết airfield approximately 5 km southwest of Phan Thiết and 2 km east of Highway 1.

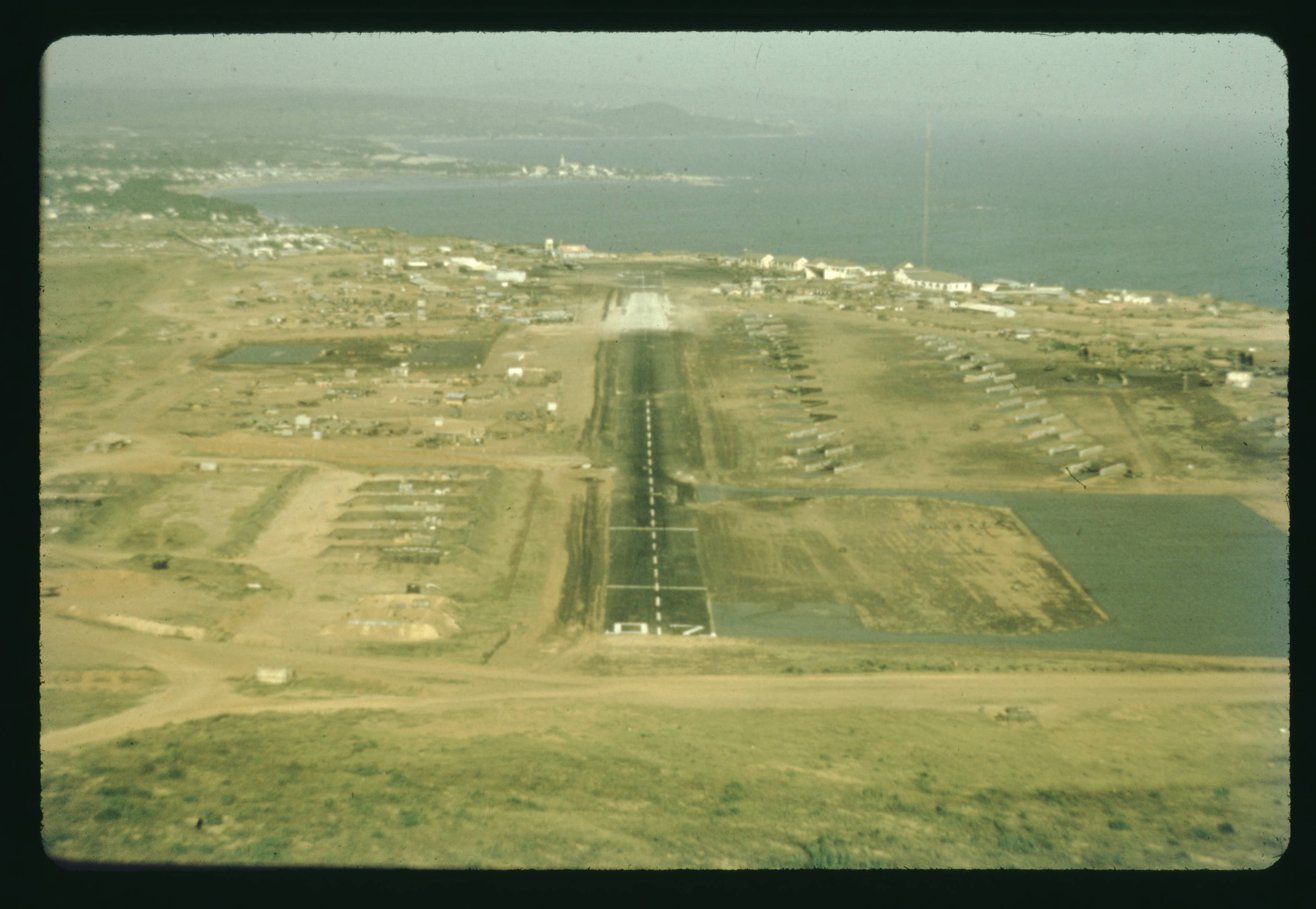
5 November 1968

The first U.S. Army unit based here was the 2nd Battalion, 7th Cavalry from September 1966 to December 1967 as part of Operation Byrd.

The 192nd Assault Helicopter Company was based here from October 1967 to January 1971.

The 3rd Battalion, 506th Infantry was based here from February 1968 to December 1969 giving the base its alternative name of Currahee Base Camp.

The 1st Battalion, 50th Infantry was based here from October 1969 to December 1970.

Other U.S. Army units based here included:

- 2nd Squadron, 1st Cavalry (May 1969)
- 5th Battalion, 27th Artillery
- 2nd Battalion, 320th Artillery
- 3rd Platoon, 272nd Military Police Co.

On the morning of 25 February 1968 the base was hit by People's Army of Vietnam (PAVN) mortar and rocket fire which exploded an ammunition bunker and was followed by a PAVN sapper attack. U.S. losses were three killed and 29 wounded and 21 PAVN killed and one captured

On 24 April 1969 a Douglas DC-3 of Far Eastern Air Transport was damaged beyond repair while landing at the airfield.

On 3 May 1970 a PAVN artillery and sapper attack on the base resulted in five U.S. killed and 25 wounded.

== Current use ==
The base is abandoned and has reverted to farmland and housing. The former airfield is now Truong Van Ly road.
