= John L. Hines =

11th Chief of Staff of the United States Army

John Leonard Hines
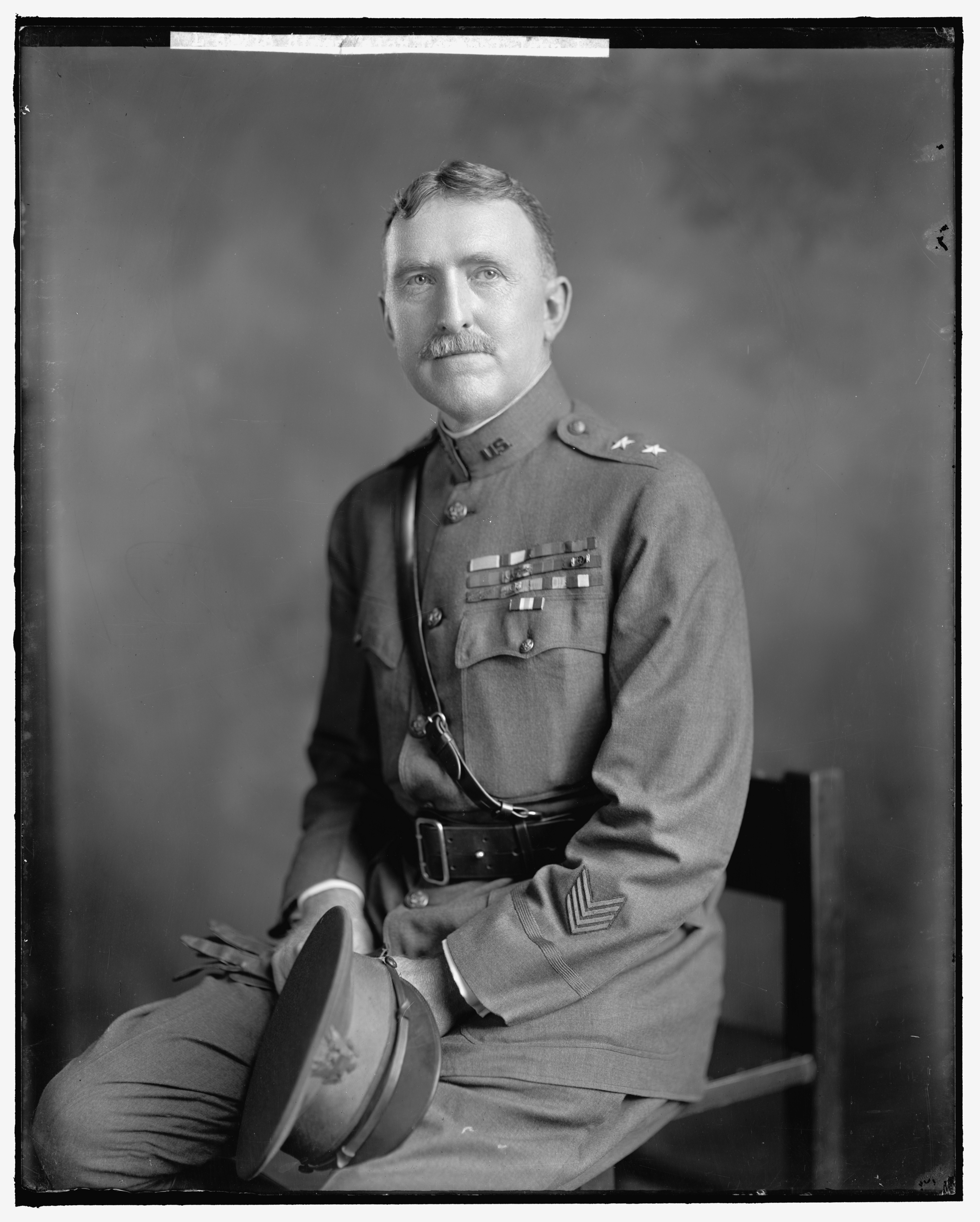
- Hines in 1905
- Born: 21 May 1868; White Sulphur Springs, West Virginia, United States
- Died: 13 October 1968 (aged 100); Washington, D.C., United States
- Burial place: Arlington National Cemetery, Section 7, Lot 8001
- Relatives: John R. D. Cleland (grandson)
- Military career
- Allegiance: United States
- Branch: United States Army
- Service years: 1891–1932
- Rank: General
- Service number: 0-23
- Commands: Philippine Department; IX Corps Area; Chief of Staff of the United States Army; VIII Corps Area; 2nd Division; 5th Division; III Corps; 4th Division; 1st Brigade
- Conflicts: Spanish–American War; Philippine–American War; World War I
- Awards: Distinguished Service Cross; Army Distinguished Service Medal; Silver Star

John Leonard Hines (21 May 1868 – 13 October 1968) was an American general who served as Chief of Staff of the United States Army from 1924 to 1926.

== Early life and military career ==
Hines was born in White Sulphur Springs, West Virginia, to Irish parents, Edward and Mary. Having won a competitive examination for a congressional appointment to the United States Military Academy (USMA) at West Point, New York, Hines, "who had a hard time maintaining passing grades but persevered", graduated 48th in his class of 65 and was commissioned as a second lieutenant in the infantry of the United States Army on 12 June 1891. While he was there he took an interest in athletics, becoming a member of one of the first football teams at West Point.

His first assignment upon his graduation was to the 2nd Infantry Regiment at Fort Omaha, Nebraska. Hines served with the regiment in Nebraska and later at Fort Harrison, Montana, from 1891 to 1898, where he married Harriet Schofield "Rita" Wherry, one of the daughters of Brigadier General William M. Wherry and Alice Grammer.

Hines served with the 25th Infantry Regiment in Cuba during the Spanish–American War and in the Philippines during the Philippine–American War. In 1898 he was elected as a Veteran Companion of the Pennsylvania Commandery of the Military Order of Foreign Wars.

He was adjutant of the Mexican Punitive Expedition in 1916–17 under Brigadier General John J. Pershing.

== World War I ==
During World War I, Hines rose rapidly in rank as he was promoted from major to lieutenant colonel in May 1917, then to colonel (November 1917), brigadier general (April 1918), and, in August 1918, to temporary major general—advancing four grades in just sixteen months. He assumed successively larger commands—from regiment to brigade, division, and finally, corps.

Hines, one of the first officers to go to France with John J. Pershing, then a major general, who had been appointed to command the American Expeditionary Forces (AEF), was placed in command of the 16th Infantry Regiment of the 1st Division in October 1917. He "put his green regiment and its inexperienced officers through rigorous training" during the winter of 1917–1918. This later paid off well "as demonstrated by the regiment's stellar performance" at the Battle of Cantigny in May 1918, "the first offensive by U.S. forces in France".

Hines commanded the 1st Infantry Brigade, 1st Division, from May to August, commanding it at the Battle of Soissons "and the occupation of the Saizerais sector", earning him high praise from his division commander, Major General Charles P. Summerall. It was for these actions which earned for himself the Distinguished Service Cross (DSC), the second-highest decoration for valor in the United States Armed Forces, with the medal's citation reading:

The President of the United States of America, authorized by Act of Congress, 9 July 1918, takes pleasure in presenting the Distinguished Service Cross to Brigadier General John Leonard Hines, Sr., United States Army, for extraordinary heroism in action while Commanding the 1st Infantry Brigade, 1st Division, A.E.F., near Berzy-le-Sec, France, 21 July 1918. At a critical time during the battle southwest of Soissons, when liaison had been broken between the 16th Infantry and 26th Infantry, and repeated efforts to reestablish it had failed, General Hines, then in command of the 1st Infantry Brigade, personally went through terrific artillery fire to the front lines of the 16th Infantry, located its left flank, and, walking in front of the lines, encouraged the troops by his example of fearlessness and disregard of danger. He then succeeded in finding the right forward elements of the 26th Infantry and directed the linking up of the two regiments, thereby enabling the operations to be pushed forward successfully.

On 16 August, Hines, promoted to major general, assumed command of the 4th Division of the AEF. He commanded the division during the AEF's first major operation at the Battle of Saint-Mihiel the following month and in the first few weeks of the huge Meuse–Argonne offensive which followed.

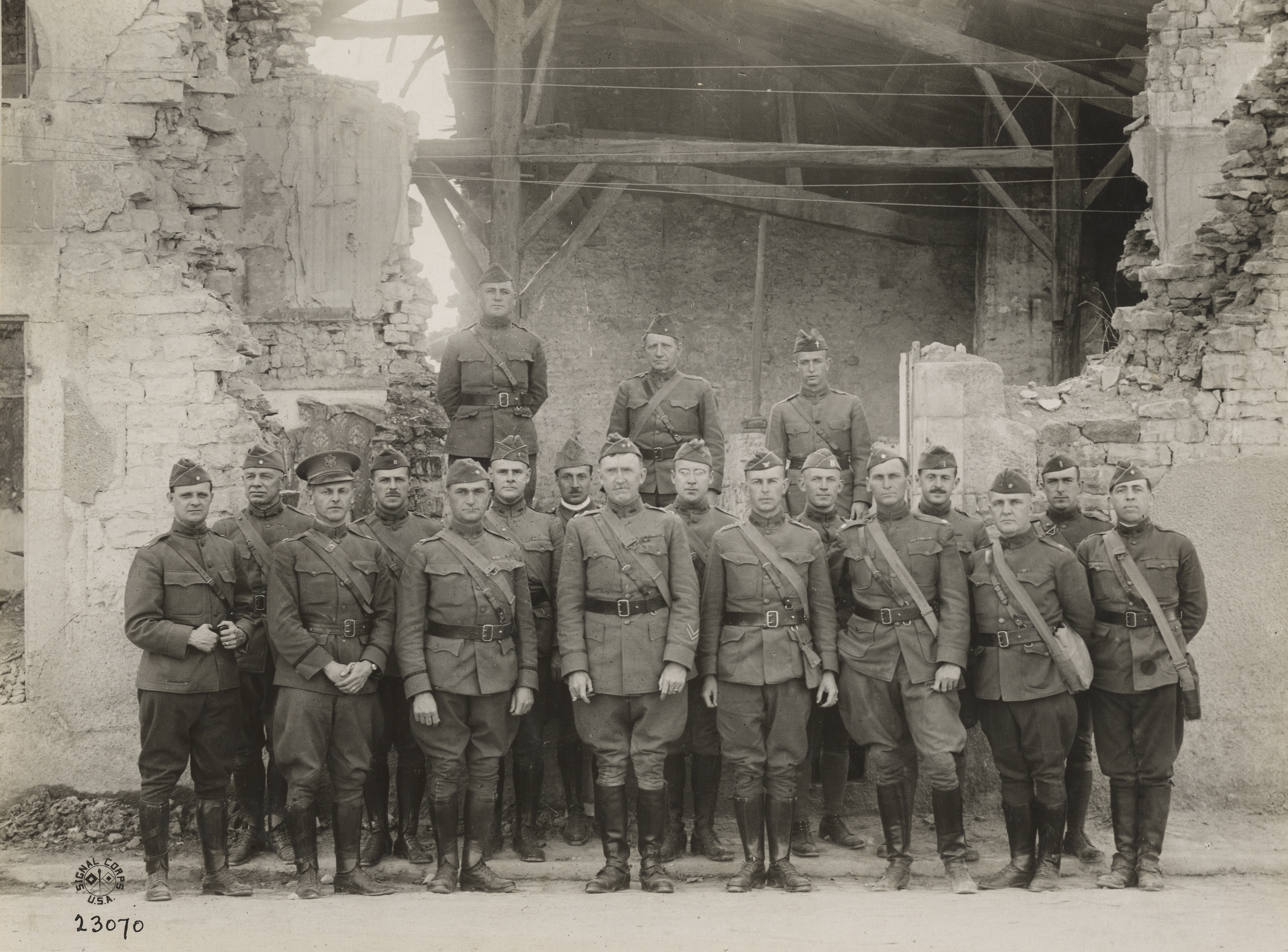
Major General John L. Hines, commanding the 4th Division, and members of his divisional staff at Haudainville, Meuse, France, 15 September 1918

Hines then was selected by Pershing, now a full general, to succeeded Major General Robert Lee Bullard in command of III Corps, leading it during the final engagements of the war and in the subsequent Allied occupation of the Rhineland, both of which "demonstrated the general's tactical and administrative skills".

For his service during the war he was awarded the Army Distinguished Service Medal, the citation for which reads:

The President of the United States of America, authorized by Act of Congress, 9 July 1918, takes pleasure in presenting the Army Distinguished Service Medal to Major General John Leonard Hines, Sr., United States Army, for exceptionally meritorious and distinguished services to the Government of the United States, in a duty of great responsibility during World War I. As Regimental, Brigade, Division, and Corps Commander, General Hines displayed marked ability in each of the important duties with which he was entrusted and exhibited in the operations near Montdidier and Soissons, and in the St. Mihiel and Argonne-Meuse offensives his high attainments as a soldier and commander.

== Post war ==
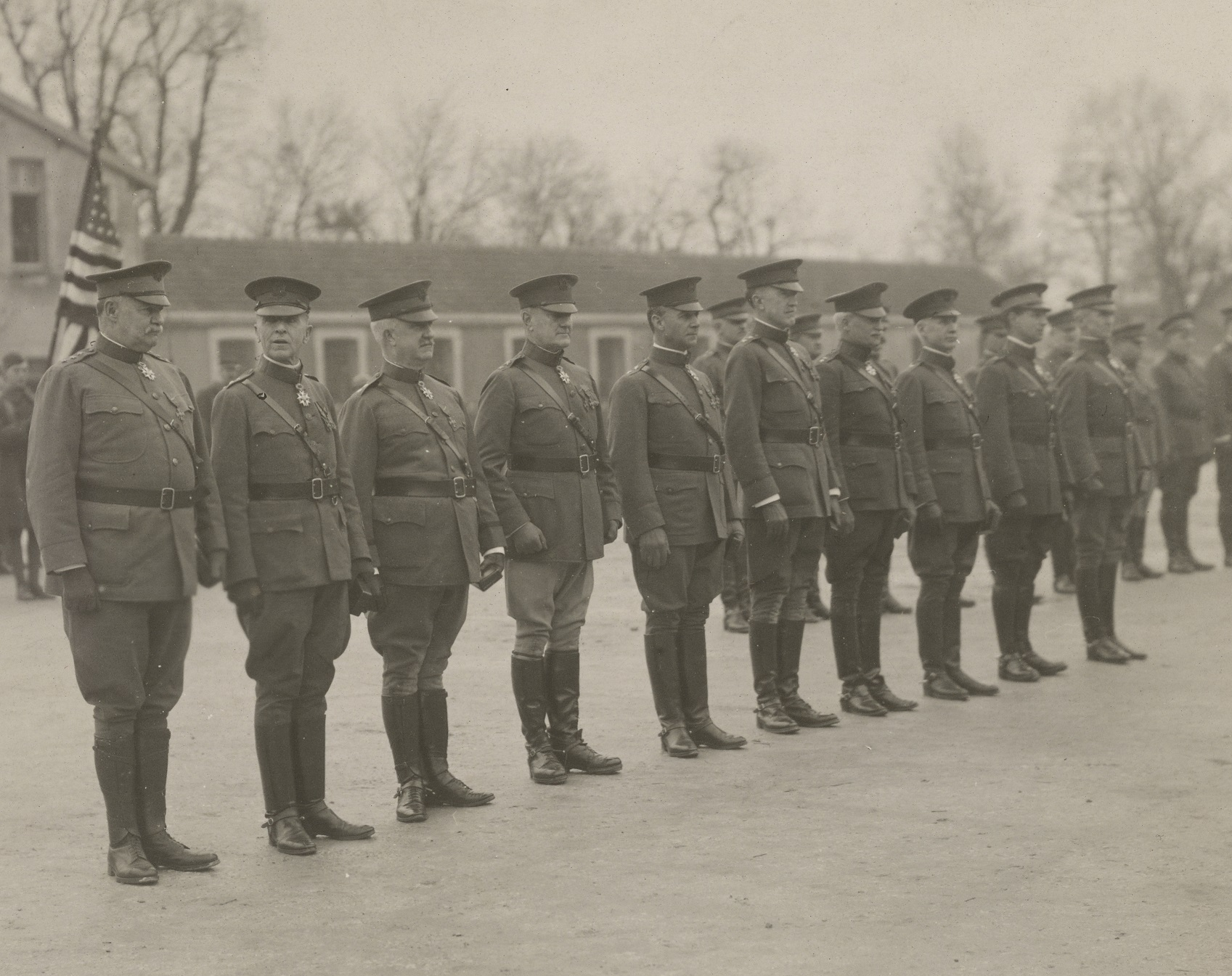
Hunter Liggett (1st on the left) with fellow US generals (left to right) Robert Bullard, James McAndrew, James Harbord, Charles Summerall, John Hines, Edward Lewis, Michael Lenihan, William Mitchell and Frank Parker, after having been decorated with the "Commandeur" of the Légion d'honneur by Marshal Philippe Pétain in 1919

Hines was promoted to permanent major general in March 1921. His post-war commands included the 5th Division, the 2nd Division and the Eighth Corps Area.

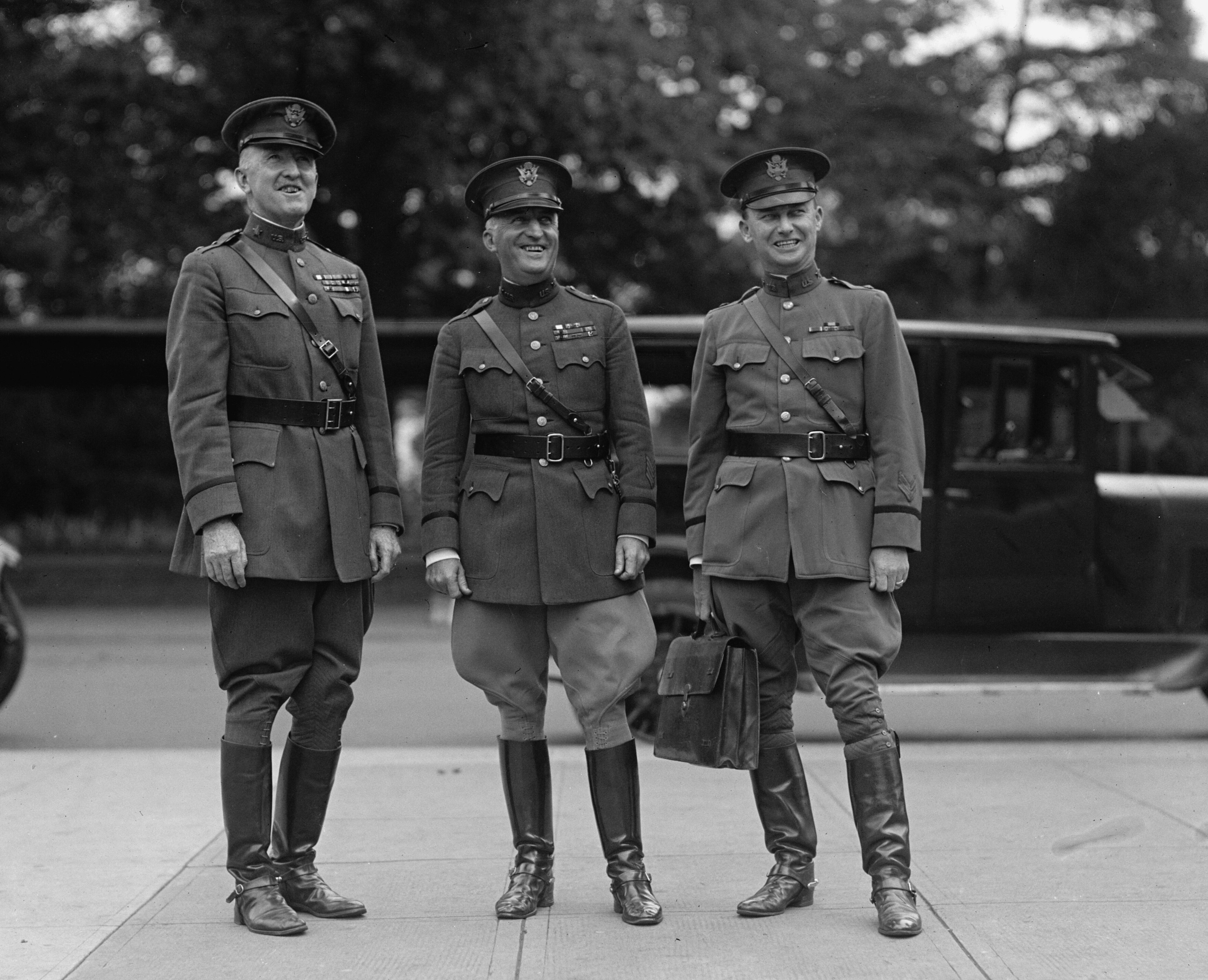
Major General John L. Hines, Brigadier General Hugh A. Drum and Major Francis B. Wilby at Capitol Hill, 1925

In December 1922, Hines was assigned as Deputy Chief of Staff of the Army, and became Chief of Staff of the United States Army on 14 September 1924. His army biography states that as chief of staff, he "stressed the need for balance in funding and personnel for all parts of the permanent establishment, pointed up the effects of strength deficiencies upon Army capability to meet the provisions of the National Defense Act of 1920, and urged action on housing and promotions to promote personnel retention."

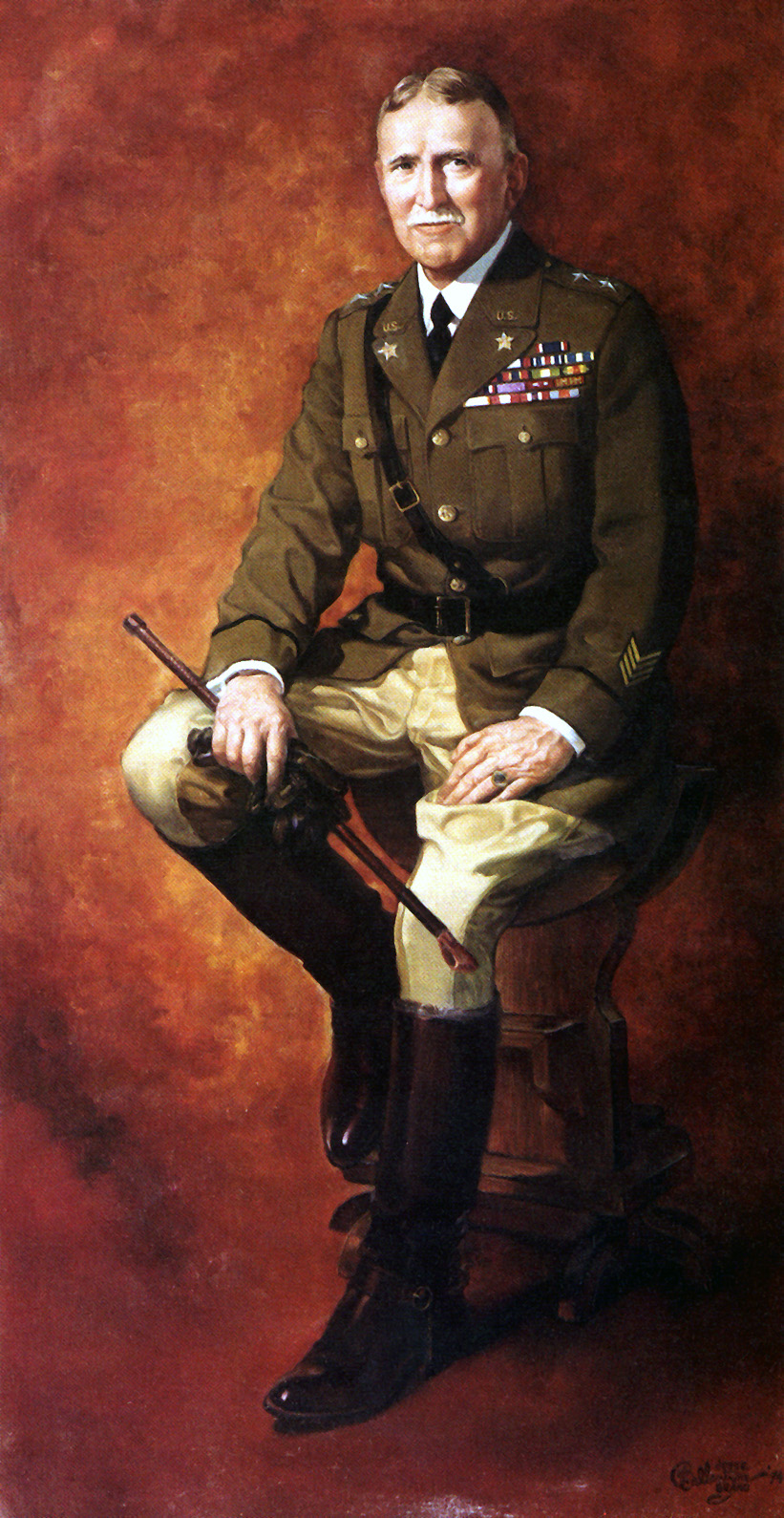
Oil painting of Hines

On 7 May 1925, Hines dedicated the landing field at the Vancouver Barracks in Vancouver, Washington, to the memory of Lieutenant Alexander Pearson Jr., who was killed on September 2, 1924, in Fairfield, Ohio while flying the Curtiss R-8 in preparation for the upcoming Pulitzer Trophy Race.

In 1926, after completing his tour as Army Chief of Staff, Hines took command of the Ninth Corps Area in California, which he led until 1930. In 1930, Hines became commanding general of the Philippine Department.

== Retirement ==
Hines retired in May 1932. He was promoted to the rank of full (4 star) general on the retired list by a Special Act of Congress on 15 June 1940.

Hines died in Washington, D.C., at Walter Reed Army Medical Center at age 100. He is buried at Arlington National Cemetery.

== Family and legacy ==
On 5 May 2000, the United States Postal Service issued the Distinguished Soldiers stamps in which Hines was honored.

Hines' son, Colonel John L. Hines Jr. (1905–1986), served in World War II with the 6th Armored Division, commanding the division's Combat Command A from November 1944 to March 1945. He was twice decorated with the Distinguished Service Cross and was severely wounded outside Frankfurt, Germany when an 88 mm antitank shell grazed his face.

== Dates of rank ==
Note that the date indicated is the date of rank. In some cases, the promotion was accepted at a later date.

Insignia	Rank	Component	Date
No pin insignia in 1891	Second Lieutenant	Regular Army	12 June 1891
	First Lieutenant	Regular Army	26 April 1898
	Captain	Regular Army	5 December 1900
	Major	Regular Army	23 May 1912
	Lieutenant Colonel	Regular Army	15 May 1917
	Colonel	Temporary	5 August 1917
	Brigadier General	National Army	12 April 1918
	Major General	National Army	8 August 1918
	Brigadier General	Regular Army	30 November 1918
	Major General	Regular Army	1 July 1920
	Major General	Retired list	31 May 1932
	General	Retired list	15 June 1940

== Awards and decorations ==

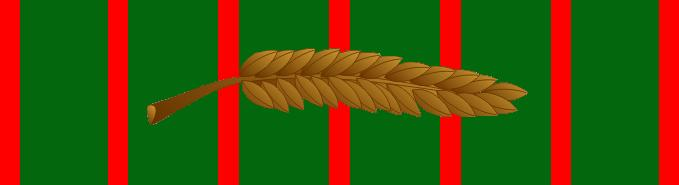

Distinguished Service Cross	Army Distinguished Service Medal	Silver Star

Spanish Campaign Medal	Army of Cuban Occupation Medal	Philippine Campaign Medal	Mexican Service Medal
World War I Victory Medal	Army of Occupation of Germany Medal	Knight Commander of the Order of St Michael and St George (United Kingdom)	Commandeur Légion d'honneur (France)
Croix de guerre with bronze palm (France)	Commander Order of Leopold (Belgium)	Knight of the Order of the Crown (Italy)	Medal of Solidarity, 1918 (Panama)

== Bibliography ==
- Davis, Henry Blaine Jr. (1998). Generals in Khaki. Raleigh, North Carolina: Pentland Press. ISBN 1571970886. OCLC 40298151.
- Zabecki, David T.; Mastriano, Douglas V., eds. (2020). Pershing's Lieutenants: American Military Leadership in World War I. New York, NY: Osprey Publishing. ISBN 978-1-4728-3863-6.
- Venzon, Anne Cipriano (2013). The United States in the First World War: an Encyclopedia. Hoboken, NJ: Taylor and Francis. ISBN 978-1-135-68453-2. OCLC 865332376.
- Coffman, Edward M. (1998). The War to End All Wars: The American Military Experience in World War. University Press of Kentucky. ISBN 978-0-8131-0955-8.

Military offices
Preceded by John J. Pershing	Chief of Staff of the United States Army; 1924–1926	Succeeded by Charles Pelot Summerall
