= United States Army Security Assistance Command =

U.S. Army command for the implementation of security assistance programs

U.S. Army Security Assistance Command (USASAC)
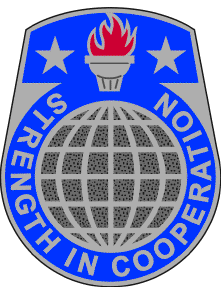
- USASAC's Distinctive Unit Insignia
- Active: 1967 – present
- Country: United States
- Branch: United States Army
- Role: Foreign Military Sales
- Size: 400 military personnel and civilians
- Part of: U.S. Army Materiel Command
- Garrison/HQ: Redstone Arsenal – Huntsville, Alabama
- Nickname: USASAC
- Motto: Strength in Cooperation

Commanders
- Current commander: Brigadier General Allen Pepper

Insignia
- Army Materiel Command Shoulder Sleeve Insignia, USASAC's higher headquarters

The United States Army Security Assistance Command (USASAC) implements security assistance programs, including the Foreign Military Sales (FMS) program, for the Department of the Army. USASAC is responsible for the United States Army security assistance information management and financial policy and provides logistics guidance to the army's security assistance community. The command also supports the U.S. government's emergency assistance, humanitarian aid, and military operations other than war, including peacekeeping operations by the United Nations.

USASAC traces its origins to the U.S. Army's technical service era and was designated a Major Subordinate Command (MSC) of the U.S. Army Materiel Command (AMC) in 1975.

Security assistance is administered by the United States Department of State. In conjunction with the White House, United States Congress, and the United States Department of the Treasury, military security assistance programs are executed by the United States Department of Defense (DoD). Security assistance "promotes regional stability, deters aggression, maintains alliances, and disseminates democratic values between the United States and its allies".

In carrying out the Army security assistance mission, USASAC calls on all AMC Life Cycle Management Commands, as well as other Department of Defense agencies and U.S. industry for support. USASAC is responsible for life cycle management of FMS cases, from development to execution, financial management, accounting, and settlement. Each sale of equipment to overseas customers comprises the same "total package" of quality material, spare parts, training, publications, technical documentation, maintenance support, and other services that AMC provides to U.S. Army units.

The USASAC was engaged in the "train and equip" mission in both Iraq and Afghanistan as well as provided support to 21 coalition partners. It was anticipated that sales in 2008 would exceed $15 billion. USASAC helped provide Iraq with weapons and ammunition, including Hellfire missiles, after it requested them in order to respond to increased domestic violence. USASAC is also responsible for life cycle management of FMS cases. Each sale to overseas customers comprises the same "total package" of quality material, spare parts, training, publications, technical documentation, maintenance support, and other services that AMC provides to United States Army units. USASAC manages about 4,600 FMS cases valued at more than $134 billion.

In 2022, Poland's purchase of 250 M1A2 SEPv3 Abrams tanks was facilitated by Security Assistance Command. Delivery is scheduled to begin in early 2025.

== History ==
Before the 1962 reorganisation of the U.S. Army which created the U.S. Army Materiel Command (AMC), the Mutual Security Division of the United States Army Ordnance Corps was response for the foreign aid programs. AMC's role in security assistance was established in February 1965 when the Logistic Control Office of the Supply and Maintenance Command (SMC) was assigned from the U.S. Army Terminal Command, Atlantic to the New Cumberland Army Depot in Pennsylvania. That same year, the Mutual Security Directorate of the SMC Logistic Control Office, New York was transferred to New Cumberland and on 1 August 1965, the U.S. Army SMC International Logistics Center (ILC) was established as a separate activity at New Cumberland.

In 1966, the growing ILC was re-designated the U.S. Army International Logistics Center, and the SMC was discontinued and its functions were assumed by AMC. The ILC continued to expand to support the Vietnam War as elements of the MSA were transferred to New Cumberland and Mutual Security Field Offices for Europe, the Far East, and the Southern Command were transferred to administrative control of the ILC.

Army security assistance was elevated to Major Subordinate Command status on 1 November 1975 when the U.S. Army International Logistics Command (USAILCOM) was formed at Headquarters, U.S. Army Materiel Development and Readiness Command (DARCOM, formerly AMC, re-designated AMC in 1984), Alexandria, Virginia. An expanded USAILCOM was reorganised in 1977 and re-designated the U.S. Army Security Assistance Center (USASAC), reflecting its mission (delegated by the CG DARCOM) as the Department of the Army Executive Agent for Security Assistance materiel programs.

USASAC gained 200 employees in 1979 when the Office of the Project Manager, Saudi Arabia National Guard modernization was assigned to USASAC. The army's security assistance mission was further consolidated in August 1985 when USASAC and Headquarters AMC developed and implemented the Army Centralised Case Management System, under which USASAC was designated the US Army as the single point of contact for managing Foreign Military Sales (FMS). On 1 April 1990, USASAC was re-designated as the U.S. Army Security Assistance Command to reflect its expanded responsibilities.

During the Gulf War, USASAC supported U.S. forces' management of Saudi Arabia's helicopter assets and parts and equipped Kuwaiti civilians with combat uniforms as they accompanied U.S. in-theatre combat forces during the Liberation of Kuwait.

The 1995 Khobar Towers bombing terrorist bombing in Saudi Arabia killed seven and injured dozens of USASAC employees.

On 1 October 2001, USASAC relocated its headquarters to Fort Belvoir, Virginia, completing a planned move onto government-owned property. Due to the 2005 Base Realignment and Closure Commission report, both Army Materiel Command and USASAC headquarters were relocated to Redstone Arsenal in Huntsville, Alabama.

The USASAC has served 140 allies and friendly countries and multinational organizations, with support by AMC, other DOD agencies, and in partnership with U.S. industry, USASAC provides materiel, training, education and, other services to help our allies strengthen their defensive capabilities, deter aggression, achieve regional stability, and promote democratic values.

=== Subordinate Organizations ===
U.S. Army Security Assistance Training Management Organization (USASATMO) that facilitates deployment of training teams throughout the world in support of equipment purchased through FMS.

Office of the Program Manager - Saudi Arabian National Guard (OPM- SANG) and the Ministry of Interior - Military Assistance Group (MOI-MAG) operate out of Saudi Arabia to provide on-the-ground support to Armed Forces of Saudi Arabia.

== Past Commanders ==
Commander	Date assumed command
Major General Thomas H. Lipscomb	September 1967
Major General Robert C. Forbes	September 1968
Brigadier General Michael E. Leeper	October 1969
Major General Arthur W. Kogstad	July 1970
Brigadier General Wallace C. Magathan	March 1972
Major General Joseph E. Fix, III	July 1973
Major General Tom H. Brain	October 1976
Major General John R. D. Cleland	July 1979
Major General Thomas F. Healy	September 1980
Major General Claud M. Kicklighter	November 1981
Major General Edward C. O'Connor	August 1983
Brigadier General Harry D. Walker	July 1986
Major General Thomas W. Kelly	August 1987
Brigadier General Walter W. Kastenmayer	January 1988
Major General Thomas G. Lightner	June 1988
Major General Raymond E. Haddock	January 1991
Major General William A. Fitzgerald Jr.	July 1992
Major General Michael S. Davison Jr.	June 1994
Major General Larry G. Smith	August 1997
Major General Bruce K. Scott	October 1999
Major General Joe. G. Taylor Jr.	August 2002
Major General Craig D. Hackett	September 2003
Brigadier General Clinton T. Anderson	September 2005
Brigadier General Michael J. Terry	September 2007
Brigadier General Christopher Tucker	16 September 2009
Major General Frank "Del" Turner	30 September 2011
Major General Jeffrey W. Drushal	16 July 2018
Brigadier General Douglas Lowrey	10 August 2020
Brigadier General Garrick Harmon	17 May 2021
Brigadier General Jason Nicholson	24 May 2024
