= Operation Byrd =

Part of the Vietnam War (1966)

- Part of the Vietnam War
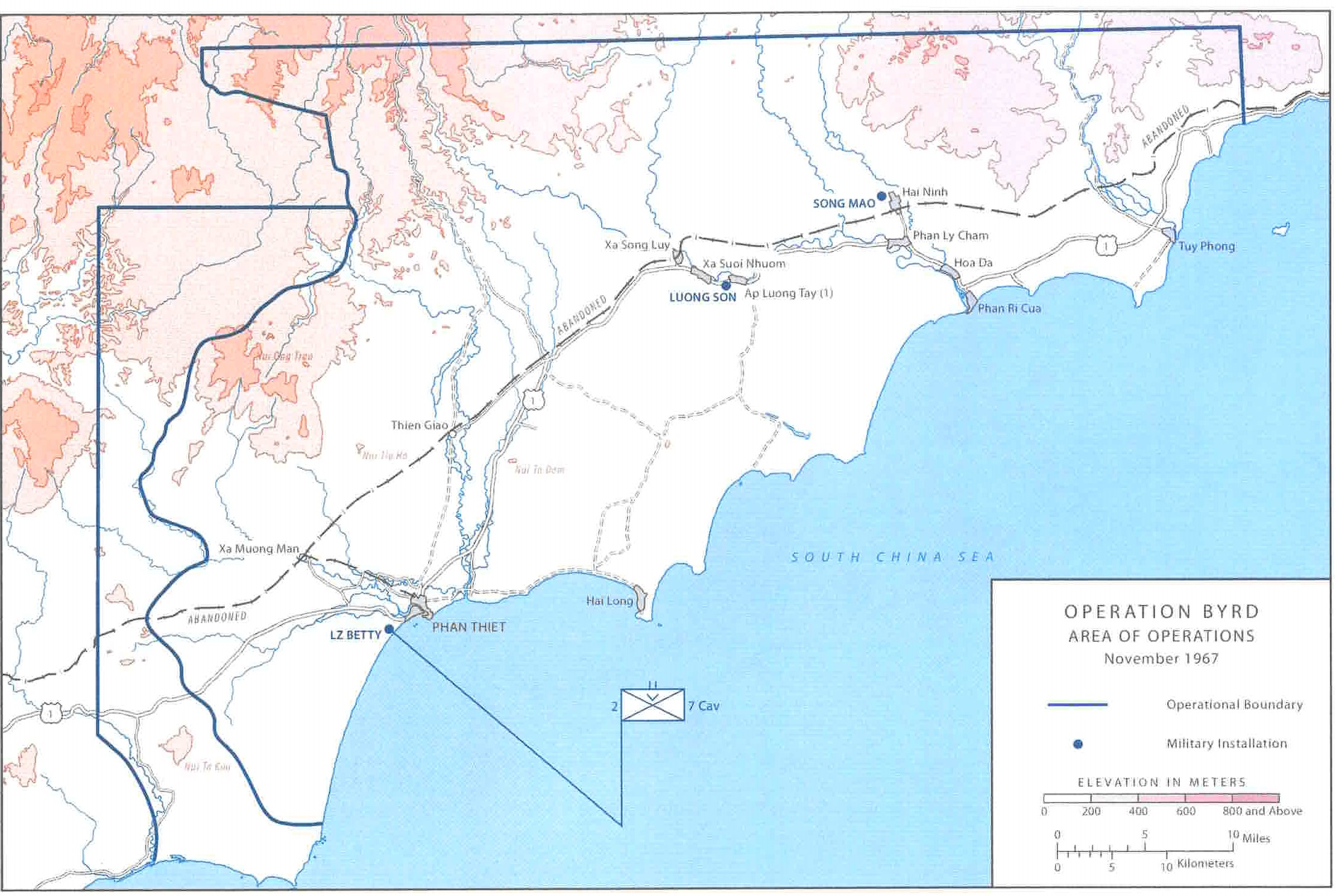
- Operation Byrd area of operations, November 1967
Date	25 August 1966 – 1 December 1967
Location	Bình Thuận Province, South Vietnam

Belligerents
United States; South Vietnam	Viet Cong

Commanders and leaders
(United States) Lt. Col. Billy M. Vaughan; Lt. Col. Joseph T. Griffin Jr. (South Vietnam) Lt. Col. Nguyen Khac Tuan	General Nguyễn Minh Châu

Units involved
(United States) 2nd Battalion, 7th Cavalry Regiment (South Vietnam) 44th Regiment	482nd Battalion; 840th Battalion

Casualties and losses
(United States) 11 killed (South Vietnam) 41 killed	913 killed 300 weapons recovered

Operation Byrd was a security operation conducted during the Vietnam War by the U.S. 2nd Battalion, 7th Cavalry Regiment and the Army of the Republic of Vietnam (ARVN) 44th Regiment in Bình Thuận Province, South Vietnam from August 1966 to 1 December 1967.

== Background ==
The southern provinces of II Corps, namely Ninh Thuận, Bình Thuận, Tuyen Duc, and Lâm Đồng Provinces and Bình Tuy Province in northern III Corps formed the Viet Cong (VC) Military Region 6 controlled by General Nguyễn Minh Châu. Châu controlled 4 VC Battalions and approximately 6 district companies. The area had seen little combat due to its small population, low rainfall and limited rice production.

== Operation ==
On 25 August 1966 the 2nd Battalion, 7th Cavalry, equipped with 38 UH-1 helicopters, plus a battery each of 105-mm. and 155-mm. howitzers was deployed to Firebase Betty south of Phan Thiết the capital of Bình Thuận Province for a search and destroy operation that was expected to last 2 months. At the conclusion of this phase the VC had lost over 250 dead for minimal Allied losses.

Following the conclusion of that operation, I Field Force commander LTG William B. Rosson decided to keep Task Force Byrd in place to provide a mobile strike force to support ARVN forces in the area, particularly the 44th Regiment commanded by the Province chief Lt. Col. Nguyen Khac Tuan.

On the evening of 16 October units of the VC 482nd Battalion attacked the Thien Giao district headquarters 18km north of Phan Thiết, penetrating the perimeter and destroying three of four bunkers before being driven off by 1st Cavalry Division helicopter gunships.

The 2/7th Cavalry and ARVN units conducted combined operations throughout late 1966 and into 1967, gradually improving security in the province but seldom encountering large VC units. By late October 1967 the operation had accounted for over 850 VC killed and 300 weapons captured for losses of 23 killed and 278 wounded.

In late 1967 COMUSMACV General William Westmoreland sought to reopen and improve Highway 1 from Xuân Lộc to Phan Rang, restoring the overland link between III Corps and II Corps. Task Force Byrd was to provide security to military engineers as they repaired and improved Highway 1 across Bình Thuận Province. The engineers would also construct platoon-size bases along the highway to provide security for the highway itself and to support pacification efforts.

On 8 November 1967 the VC 840th Battalion and the 450th Local Force Company attacked the under construction Fort Mara (11.503°N 108.277°E), 15km northeast of Phan Thiết which contained the headquarters and an infantry company from the ARVN 3rd Battalion, 44th Regiment. The unit's U.S. adviser called for support and the commander of Task Force Byrd, Lt. Col. Joseph T. Griffin Jr., sent a three UH–1 Night Hunter team, with the first helicopter carrying infantrymen equipped with Starlight scope rifles flying low to the ground, the second helicopter dropped flares from a higher altitude and the third helicopter was armed with aerial rockets to return any hostile fire. An AC-47 Spooky gunship also arrived to assist the defenders and together they succeeded in holding back the VC until dawn when a company from the 2/7th Cavalry arrived forcing the VC to withdraw. ARVN losses were 28 killed and 35 wounded, while VC losses were 42 killed.

On 22 November the VC launched a mortar attack on an ARVN outpost at Thien Giao. Griffin sent an infantry platoon to engage the VC. When the helicopters landed in a clearing near the outpost, they were met by small arms and machine gun fire from the VC 482nd Battalion which had planned to ambush such an air assault. Griffin sent the rest of the 2/7th Cavalry to relieve the stranded platoon and these helicopters were also met by intense fire around the landing zone with two forced to crash-land. After several hours the 482nd Battalion disengaged from combat. U.S. losses were 11 dead and 36 wounded, while VC losses were estimated as 21 killed.

== Aftermath ==
Operation Byrd was suspended on 1 December 1967 and the 2/7th Cavalry join the 1st Brigade, 101st Airborne Division, in Operation Klamath Falls along the border between Bình Thuận and Lâm Đồng Provinces. Operation Byrd was succeeded by Operation McLain conducted by the 3rd Battalion, 506th Infantry Regiment.
