= Michael S. Davison Jr. =

United States Army general

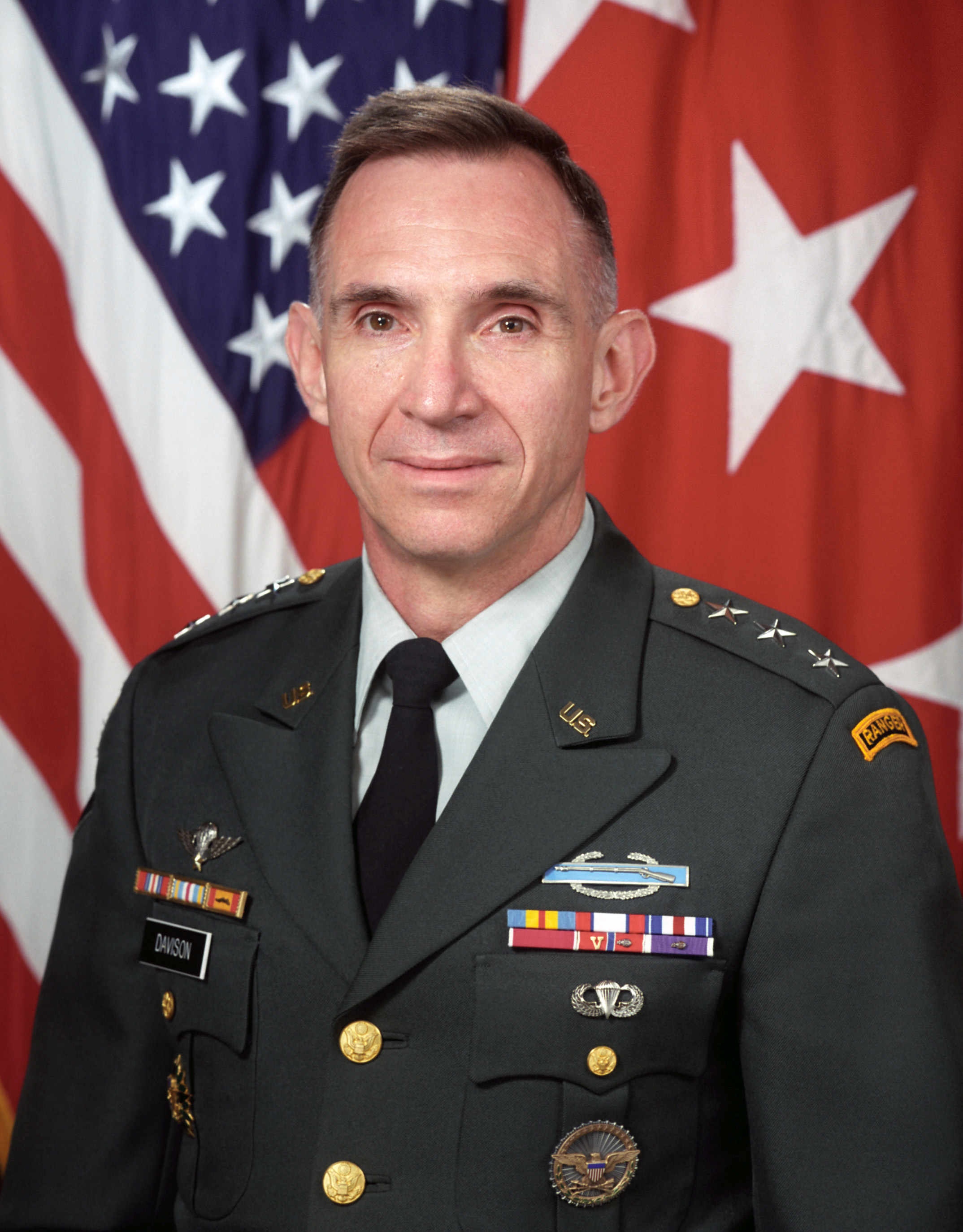
- Lt. Gen. Michael S. Davison, Jr. in 1997
- Born: November 19, 1941 (age 84); El Paso, Texas, U.S.
- Relatives: Michael S. Davison (father)
- Military career
- Allegiance: United States of America
- Branch: United States Army
- Service years: 1964–2000
- Rank: Lieutenant general
- Conflicts: Vietnam War
- Awards: Silver Star

Michael Shannon Davison Jr. (born 19 November 1941) is a retired United States Army Lieutenant general.

== Early life and education ==
Davison was born on 19 November 1941 in El Paso, Texas into a military family. His father Michael S. Davison was a United States Army four-star general who served as Commander in Chief, U.S. Army Europe/Commander, Central Army Group from 1971 to 1975. He graduated from the United States Military Academy in 1964.

== Military career ==
In October 1967 then Captain Davison took command of Company C, 5th Battalion, 7th Cavalry. During the Battle of Huế, from 8–25 February 1968 Davison's company was heavily engaged in combat as they attempted to sever the People's Army of Vietnam (PAVN) supply lines into the city of Huế. For his actions during the battle on 12 February, Davison was subsequently awarded the Silver Star.

From June 1994 to July 1997 Major general Davison served as commander of United States Army Security Assistance Command.

Davison retired from the Army in 2000.

== Personal ==
In the 2024 United States presidential election, Davison endorsed Kamala Harris.
