= John L. Hines Jr. =

John Leonard Hines Jr.
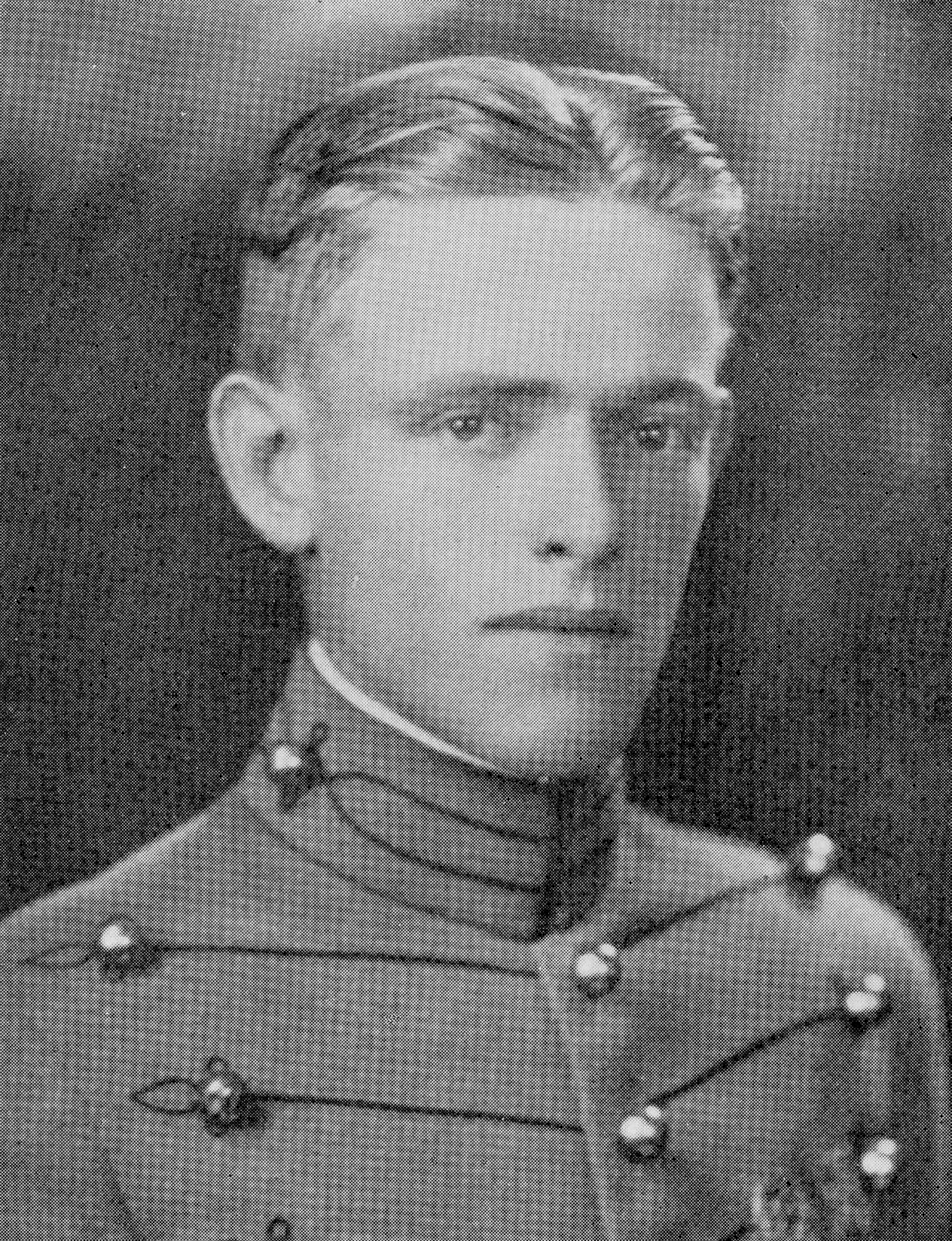
- Hines Jr. at West Point in 1927
- Born: March 8, 1905; Cincinnati, Ohio, US
- Died: November 19, 1986 (aged 81); Washington, D.C., US
- Burial place: Arlington National Cemetery
- Relatives: General John L. Hines (father); John R. D. Cleland (nephew)
- Military career
- Allegiance: United States
- Branch: United States Army
- Service years: 1927–1952
- Rank: Colonel
- Service number: 0-16749
- Commands: Combat Command A, 6th Armored Division; 2nd Battalion, 68th Armor Regiment
- Conflicts: World War II
- Awards: Distinguished Service Cross (2); Army Distinguished Service Medal; Silver Star; Bronze Star Medal (2); Purple Heart (3)

Colonel John Leonard Hines Jr. (March 8, 1905 – November 19, 1986) was an officer in the United States Army and the son of General John L. Hines.

Hines graduated from West Point in 1927, and served in World War II with the 6th Armored Division as a colonel, commanding the division's Combat Command A from November 1944 to March 1945. He was twice decorated with the Distinguished Service Cross and was severely wounded outside Frankfurt, Germany when an anti-tank shell struck his face.

== Early life ==
Hines was born in Cincinnati, Ohio on March 8, 1905, the son of army officer John L. Hines. He graduated from the United States Military Academy at West Point, New York, in 1927 and was ranked 16th of 203 in his class. Hines was appointed a lieutenant and assigned to the 11th Cavalry at the Presidio in California. In 1930, he was appointed aide to his father, who was then commanding the Department of the Philippines.

== Military career ==
=== Early career ===
Hines completed the Cavalry School at Fort Riley, Kansas, in 1932 and was promoted to first lieutenant, after which he commanded a company at a Civilian Conservation Corps camp in Albany, Missouri. He served as an aide to Major General Frank C. Bolles, and then started the Advanced Equitation Course, from which he graduated in 1936.

Hines then commanded a troop with the 3rd Cavalry Regiment at Fort Myer, Virginia, and was promoted to captain. He then served as an instructor in tactics and equitation at West Point, where he also served as the supply officer and adjutant for the post's cavalry squadron, as well as coach of the Cadet polo team.

=== World War II ===
In 1940 Hines, by now a lieutenant colonel, was posted to the 6th Armored Division at Fort Knox, Kentucky where he commanded 2nd Battalion, 68th Armor Regiment, and then advanced to executive officer of the regiment. In 1943, a reorganization of armored divisions led to an excess of lieutenant colonels, and Hines was assigned to the training and operations staff section (G-3) of Army Ground Forces in Washington, D.C.

Hines received promotion to colonel while with Army Ground Forces, and in September 1944 he was assigned to the staff of the Third United States Army, then fighting in France. In October, he was assigned to command of Combat Command A, 6th Armored Division.

By late March 1945, Combat Command A was in Germany and had been assigned to clear defenses in an angle between the Main and Rhine rivers, seize the bridges into Frankfurt, and enter the city of Frankfurt. Hines had left Morfelden in his tank and advanced toward the Frankfurt airport with his lead troops, intending to destroy a large concentration of anti-aircraft artillery, which would increase the chances of seizing intact one or more of the bridges into the city.

Hines and his tank crew were at a road junction near the autobahn when an incoming shell hit the deck and turret of the tank. Hines was blinded, suffered burns and other facial injuries, and lost several fingers on his left hand. Combat Command A continued their mission, seized a bridge over the Main, and entered Frankfurt. Hines was evacuated, and began a series of surgeries and treatments at hospitals in France, England, and the United States.

== Retirement and later life ==
Hines went through over 50 reconstructive surgeries, but did not regain his sight, and was unable to return to duty. In 1952 he retired for disability with the rank of colonel. After leaving the Army he resided in Washington, D.C.

Hines was in the 6th Armored Division Association from its founding in 1948 until his death. He was the association's honorary vice president and served as president of Task Force DC, a group of more than 100 members in the Washington, D.C., area.

Hines died in Washington, D.C., on November 19, 1986. He was buried at Arlington National Cemetery, Section 7, Site 8002 RH.

== Awards and decorations ==
While in Combat Command A, 6th Armored Division, Hines was awarded: the Distinguished Service Cross with oak leaf cluster; Army Distinguished Service Medal; Silver Star; Bronze Star Medal with oak leaf cluster; Purple Heart with two oak leaf clusters; the French Legion of Honor (Chevalier); and the French Croix de Guerre with Palm. He was also a recipient of: the American Defense Service Medal; American Campaign Medal; and the European-African-Middle Eastern Campaign Medal with four battle stars. His pre-World War II awards included the Royal Order of Cambodia and the Dragon of Annam (French Indo-China).

== Family ==
Hines first married Alberta Matthews; they later divorced. He later married Ova Richmond, who died in 1981. Hines was the father of a son, John L. Hines III.

== College coaching record ==
Record table
Season	Team	Overall	Conference	Standing	Postseason
Army Cadets Independent (1943–1944)
1943–44	Army	5–4–0			
Army:		5–4–0			
Total:		5–4–0			
National champion Postseason invitational champion Conference regular season champion Conference regular season and conference tournament champion Division regular season champion Division regular season and conference tournament champion Conference tournament champion
