= George S. Blanchard =

American military general

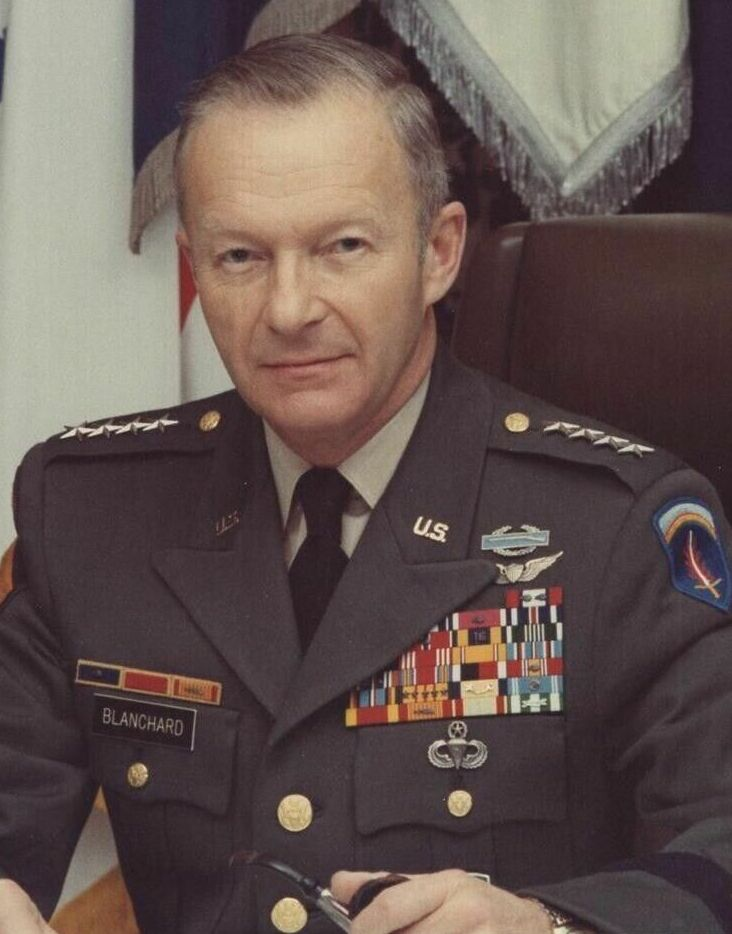
- George S. Blanchard
- Born: 3 April 1920; Washington, D.C., U.S.
- Died: 3 May 2006 (aged 86); Alexandria, Virginia, U.S.
- Military career
- Allegiance: United States
- Branch: United States Army
- Service years: 1941–1979
- Rank: General
- Commands: United States Army Europe; VII Corps; 82nd Airborne Division; 2nd Airborne Battle Group, 503rd Infantry
- Conflicts: World War II; Vietnam War
- Awards: Army Distinguished Service Medal (4); Silver Star (2); Legion of Merit (3); Distinguished Flying Cross; Bronze Star Medal
- Other work: President, Retired Officers Association; President, United Service Organizations consultant

George Samuel Blanchard (3 April 1920 – 3 May 2006) was a United States Army four-star general who served as Commander in Chief, United States Army Europe/Commander, Central Army Group from 1975 to 1979.

== Early life ==
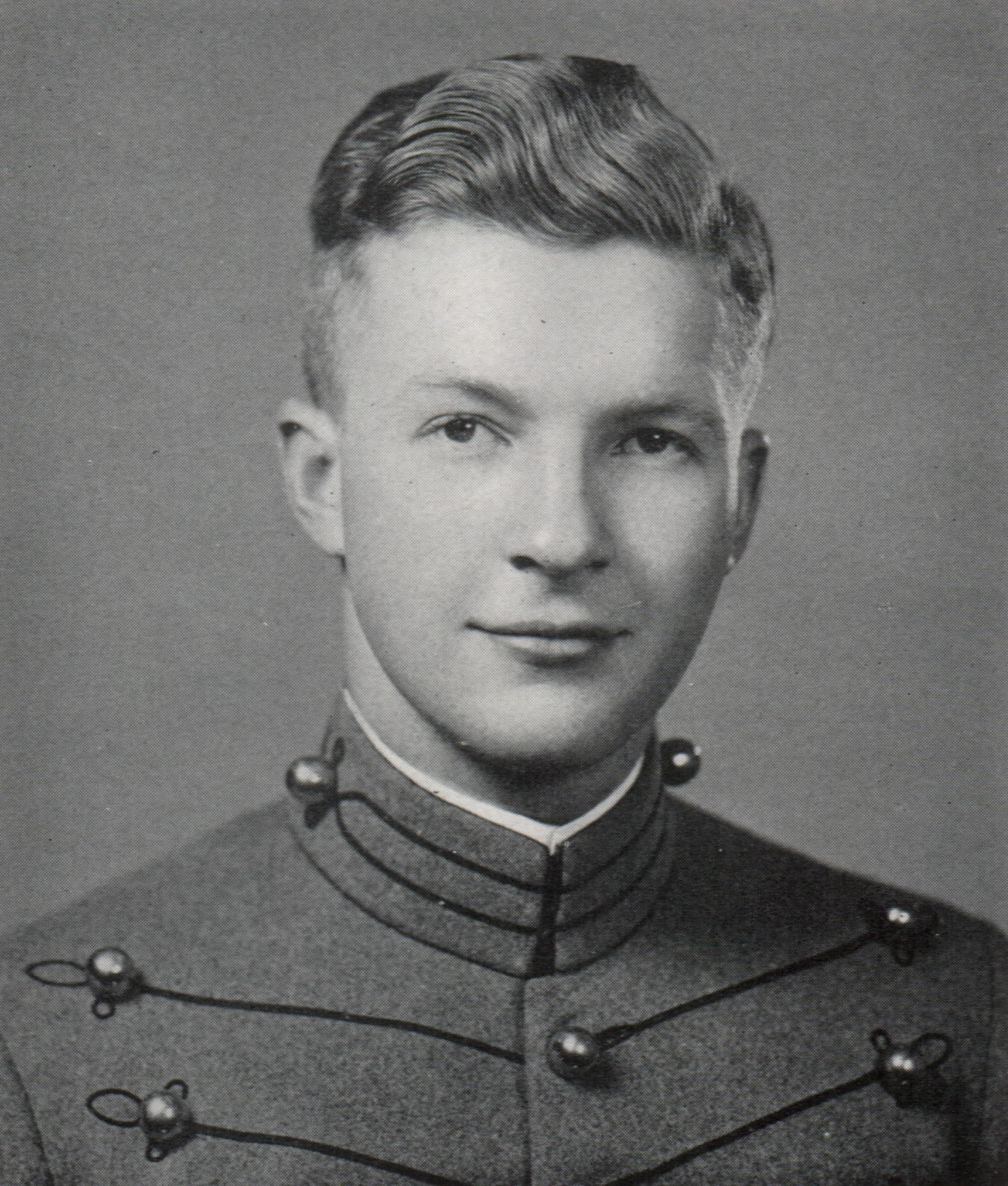
Blanchard as a United States Military Academy cadet c. 1944

Blanchard was born on 3 April 1920, in Washington, D.C., and graduated in 1938 from Eastern High School. After high school he attended American University from 1938 to 1940, then enlisted in the National Guard, serving in the Coast Artillery and rising to the rank of sergeant. He received a National Guard appointment to the United States Military Academy and graduated on D-Day, 6 June 1944. He was commissioned in the infantry, and was soon deployed to Europe, serving with the 70th and 78th Infantry Divisions.

== Military career ==
After World War II, Blanchard served on the general staff of United States Forces, European Theater, and then returned to the US to earn a Master of Science degree in Public Administration from the Maxwell School of Citizenship and Public Affairs at Syracuse University in 1949.

Blanchard served in various positions during the 1950s, including as an assistant to the Chairman of the Joint Chiefs of Staff, General Omar Bradley, a tactics instructor at Fort Benning; and as a military advisor in Taiwan from 1955 to 1957.

After being promoted to colonel in 1959, Blanchard assumed command of the 2nd Airborne Battle Group, 503rd Infantry, 82nd Airborne Division, and subsequently served as the G-3 of I Corps in Korea. In 1966, he went to South Vietnam and served as Assistant Division Commander, 1st Cavalry Division (Airmobile), and later served as Chief of Staff, I Field Force, Vietnam. After his time in Vietnam, he was assigned as Director of Special Warfare in the Office of the Deputy Chief of Staff for Military Operations; and Director of Plans, Programs and Budget for two major Army General Staff organizations, and he served as executive officer to two Secretaries of the Army.

After his time at the Pentagon, Blanchard took command of the 82nd Airborne Division in 1970. He next returned to Europe to command the VII Corps, and subsequently United States Army Europe, as the army was transitioning to an all-volunteer force. He is credited with instituting the use of television to broadcast command information. He also instituted the Sergeant Morales competition in 1973, a program to designed to improve the morale and performance of the NCO corps. Blanchard was also known for his attempts to combat alcoholism in the army, which included banning discount drinks during happy hours in post clubs, prohibiting units from holding drinking contests, and opening the first alcoholism treatment center in Europe for officers and senior enlisted soldiers.

== Decorations ==
Blanchard's awards and decorations included the Army Distinguished Service Medal, the Silver Star, the Legion of Merit, the Distinguished Flying Cross, the Bronze Star Medal, the Air Medal, Army Aviator Badge, and Airborne badge. His military education included the Infantry Officer Advanced Course, Basic Airborne Course, Command and General Staff College and the Armed Forces Staff College. He retired in 1979.

== Post-military ==
Blanchard retired to McLean, Virginia, where he established General Analysis Inc., a defense consulting firm. He was also a member of the Atlantic Council Board, the Army Science Board, the Washington Institute of Foreign Affairs and president of both the Retired Officers Association and the United Service Organizations in the 1980s.

In 1990, the Blanchards moved to North Carolina, and while there he helped organize a program where retirees tutor the illiterate. In 2001, the Association of Graduates, the United States Military Academy alumni organization, selected him as that year's recipient of the Distinguished Graduate Award. He and his wife returned to Virginia in 2002 to live at The Fairfax, a military retirement community in Fort Belvoir.

Blanchard died of pneumonia on 3 May 2006, at Inova Mount Vernon Hospital at the age of 86. At the time of his death he was survived by his wife Beth H. Blanchard, four daughters, eight grandchildren, and three great-grandchildren.

Military offices
Preceded by Michael S. Davison	Commanding General of United States Army Europe; 1975–1979	Succeeded by Frederick J. Kroesen
