= John R. D. Cleland =

US Army major general (1925–2017)

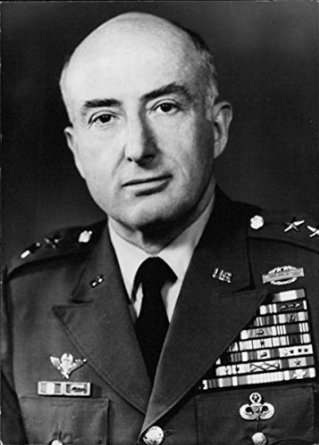
- Cleland, probably as commander of the 8th Infantry Division in 1975
- Born: 5 July 1925; Washington, DC, US
- Died: 25 October 2017 (aged 92); Melbourne, Florida, US
- Burial place: Arlington National Cemetery
- Education: Municipal University of Omaha; George Washington University; United States Army Command and General Staff College; United States Army War College
- Spouse: Clara Kehoe (m. 1952–2017)
- Children: 5
- Relatives: John L. Hines Jr. (uncle); John L. Hines (grandfather); William M. Wherry (great-grandfather)
- Military career
- Service: United States Army
- Service years: 1943–1980
- Rank: Major General
- Service number: 041361
- Unit: Infantry Branch
- Commands: Headquarters and Headquarters Company, 2nd Battalion, 188th Parachute Infantry Regiment; Company G, 187th Airborne Infantry Regiment; 3rd Battalion, 503rd Infantry Regiment; Task Force South, II Field Force; US Military Mission to Cambodia; 8th Infantry Division; United States Army Security Assistance Command
- Wars: World War II; Occupation of Japan; Korean War; Vietnam War
- Awards: Army Distinguished Service Medal (2); Silver Star; Legion of Merit (4); Purple Heart (2); Combat Infantryman Badge; Master Parachutist Badge
- Other work: Strategic planning consultant

John Robin Davis Cleland Jr. (5 July 1925 – 25 October 2017) was a career officer in the United States Army. A veteran of World War II, the Korean War, and the Vietnam War, he served from 1943 to 1980 and attained the rank of major general. Cleland's commands included the 8th Infantry Division (1975 to 1977), and his awards included two awards of the Army Distinguished Service Medal, the Silver Star, four awards of the Legion of Merit, and two awards of the Purple Heart.

A native of Washington, D.C., Cleland came from a prominent military family that included his grandfather, General John L. Hines. He was raised and educated in Washington, and enlisted in the military for World War II. He entered the U.S. Army as a private, completed Officer Candidate School and Airborne School, and began a career in the Infantry. He served in the Philippines at the end of the war, and in the post-war Occupation of Japan. He went on to serve as a company commander during the Korean War, during which he was wounded twice.

Cleland's later assignments included completion of United States Army Command and General Staff College (CGSC) as a student, and member of the CGSC faculty; while teaching at the staff college, he completed a bachelor's degree at the Municipal University of Omaha. After deployment to South Vietnam as an advisor to that country's military, he graduated from the United States Army War College and completed a master's degree at George Washington University.

During his second tour in Vietnam, Cleland commanded first a battalion, and later a brigade. Subsequent postings included chief of the US Military Mission to Cambodia, commander of the 8th Infantry Division, and commander of the United States Army Security Assistance Command. He retired from the army in 1980 and became a resident of Melbourne, Florida. Cleland worked as a strategic planning consultant until 1999 and was a noted activist for veteran's and civic causes. He died in Melbourne on 25 October 2017 and was buried at Arlington National Cemetery.

== Early life ==
John Robin Davis Cleland Jr. was born in Washington, DC on 5 July 1925, the son of John R. D. Cleland Sr. and Alice (Hines) Cleland. The senior Cleland was an army officer who received the Distinguished Service Cross for heroism in World War I and retired as a major. Alice Hines was the daughter of General John L. Hines, who served as Chief of Staff of the United States Army, and the granddaughter of William M. Wherry, an American Civil War recipient of the Medal of Honor. Colonel John L. Hines Jr., a Second World War recipient of the Distinguished Service Cross with oak leaf cluster, was her brother.

Cleland was raised and educated at army posts in locations including California, Nebraska, and the Philippines until 1938, when his parents divorced. His mother, two sisters and he then lived with his mother's parents in Washington, DC. Cleland graduated from Woodrow Wilson High School in 1943. He missed his formal high school graduation ceremony because in early June, shortly before turning 18, he enlisted for World War II military service. Cleland joined the United States Army as a private; he was inducted at Fort Lee, Virginia and completed basic training at Fort Hood, Texas.

== Start of career ==
After basic training, Cleland drove a truck in support of basic training units at Fort Hood and Camp Blanding, Florida while awaiting orders to attend Airborne School. After completing the airborne course at Fort Benning, Georgia, he was among the graduates selected for attendance at a newly organized Parachute Demolition School, at which students were taught reconnaissance and sabotage techniques. He then attended Officer Candidate School, also at Fort Benning; he graduated in November 1944 and received his commission as a second lieutenant of Infantry. Afterwards, he attended Jumpmaster School, which was followed by completion of the Infantry Officer Advanced Course.

After completing his initial training, Cleland returned to Camp Blanding, where he participated in training new recruits while awaiting orders to serve overseas. In early 1945, he was assigned to The 503rd Parachute Regimental Combat Team, then involved in combat on Negros island in the Philippines. Cleland served as the regiment's assistant demolition platoon leader; in addition to patrols against Japanese forces, he provided extensive training to unit members on the use of Bangalore torpedoes and other explosives. He remained in this position until the end of the war in August 1945. As Japanese troops in the Philippines surrendered, he commanded one of three prisoner of war camps operated by his regiment. In the camps, US officers including Cleland had responsibility for disarming Japanese military members and transporting them back to Japan.

== Continued career ==
After his service in the Philippines, Cleland took part in the Occupation of Japan as a platoon leader in Company E, 188th Parachute Infantry Regiment and was based in Sendai. After this assignment, he was posted to Sapporo, where he was assigned as aide-de-camp to the assistant division commander of the 11th Airborne Division. After completing this assignment, he was appointed commander of Headquarters and Headquarters Company, 2nd Battalion, 188th Parachute Infantry Regiment. Cleland returned to the United States at the end of 1947 and was assigned as aide-de-camp to Major General Williston B. Palmer, commander of the 82nd Airborne Division.

In 1950, Cleland was assigned to Korean War duty as executive officer and later commander of Company G, 187th Airborne Infantry Regiment. His wartime duty included a combat parachute jump north of Pyongyang, the North Korean capital. In February 1951, he was wounded near Chechon and Sillim; during fighting against North Korean troops, he was shot in one arm. He received first aid and continued to fight, then was hit in the other arm about 30 minutes later. He required extensive hospitalization to convalesce, including facilities in South Korea, Japan, and at Walter Reed Army Hospital. He served as an instructor at the Infantry School in 1953, and in 1954 he graduated from the United States Army Command and General Staff College. He was then assigned as range officer for a live fire training facility in West Germany, where he served until 1955.

Cleland served in Korea again in the late 1950s, then joined the faculty of the Command and General Staff College (CGSC). While assigned to the CGSC, he was admitted to the Phi Alpha Theta honor society and in 1962 he completed a Bachelor of General Education degree at the Municipal University of Omaha under a program that permitted staff college faculty members to complete their civilian education. After his college graduation, in 1962 and 1963 Cleland served in South Vietnam as an advisor to that country's military. In 1965 he was assigned to take the course at the United States Army War College, and he graduated in 1966. Also in 1966, he completed his Master of Science degree in political science at George Washington University.

=== Family ===
In 1952, Cleland met Clara Kehoe, an army nurse who was assigned to the first hospital in which he was treated after he was wounded. They met again while Cleland convalesced at Walter Reed Army Hospital, and they married in 1952. Clara Kehoe Cleland's military service spanned 1948 to 1952, and she attained the rank of first lieutenant. Her awards included the Korean Service Medal with 4 bronze service stars, the United Nations Service Medal Korea, and the Army of Occupation Medal (Japan). The Clelands were married until his death and were the parents of five children.

== Later career ==
From 1966 to 1967, Cleland served as assistant chief of staff for operations (G-3) for the 82nd Airborne Division. He then returned to Vietnam, this time as commander of 3rd Battalion, 503rd Infantry Regiment. After promotion to colonel, he served as deputy commander of the 173rd Airborne Brigade in Vietnam. He later commanded a new brigade task force formed to provide security in the four southern provinces of the Vietnam II Corps area. This brigade, Task Force South, operated with the South Vietnamese 44th Infantry Regiment. Post-Vietnam War assignments included chief of US Military Mission to Cambodia from 1972 to 1974. From 1975 to 1977, he commanded the 8th Infantry Division in West Germany. From 1977 to 1979, he served as vice director for plans and policy in the office of the Joint Chiefs of Staff. From 1979 until his 1980 retirement, Cleland commanded the United States Army Security Assistance Command.

After leaving the army, Cleland settled in Florida and began a second career working as a strategist and consultant for Burdeshaw Associates of Bethesda, Maryland. In this role, he took part in projects ranging in length from several weeks to two years, including winning a contract for Grumman corporation to supply integrated field test equipment for the M1 Abrams tank and providing analysis that enabled AM General Corporation to make improvements to production of the army's Humvee wheeled vehicle. He also provided expert testimony at an International Court of Arbitration hearing in Paris when a British firm attempted to recover money lost in 1979 when the Iranian Revolutionary Government cancelled a contract for the purchase of British tanks; the firm ultimately recovered 50 percent of its losses.

Cleland was also a civic activist and advocate for veterans. he served as president of the Cape Canaveral chapter of the Military Officers Association of America. He was a trustee of the Cape Canaveral Hospital Foundation from 1984 to 1988, and was an advisor to the Florida Institute of Technology Reserve Officers' Training Corps battalion from 1984 to 2013. He was a member of the Brevard Arts Council's board of directors from 1985 to 1990. In addition, he served on the board of governors of the Eau Gallie Yacht Club from 1986 to 1991. He also served on the committee that was formed to advocate against construction of a fixed Pineda Causeway bridge over the Grand Canal, which would have blocked most Grand Canal boat traffic. The developer later agreed to construct a drawbridge, which was named after Cleland in 2020. From 1992 to 2002, Cleland served on the board of overseers of the Florida Institute of Technology's School of Business. Cleland died in Melbourne, Florida on 25 October 2017. He was buried at Arlington National Cemetery.

== Awards ==
Cleland's US awards included the Army Distinguished Service Medal with oak leaf cluster, Silver Star, Legion of Merit with 3 oak leaf clusters, Purple Heart with oak leaf cluster, Bronze Star Medal, Combat Infantryman Badge, and Master Parachutist Badge. His foreign awards included the Distinguished Service Order from South Vietnam and the South Vietnamese Gallantry Cross with gold star. In 1971, he was inducted into the Officer Candidate School Hall of Fame. In 2013, he was inducted into the Florida Veterans' Hall of Fame.

== Dates of rank ==
- Private, 2 June 1943
- Second Lieutenant (Army of the United States), 8 June 1944
- First Lieutenant (Army of the United States), 13 March 1946
- Second Lieutenant (Regular Army), 18 March 1947
- First Lieutenant (Regular Army), 13 July 1949
- Captain (Army of the United States), 30 December 1950
- Captain (Regular Army), 1 April 1953
- Major (Army of the United States), 14 May 1958
- Major (Regular Army), 5 July 1960
- Lieutenant Colonel (Army of the United States), 8 January 1963
- Lieutenant Colonel (Regular Army), 5 May 1967
- Colonel (Army of the United States), 13 March 1968
- Colonel (Regular Army), 5 July 1971
- Brigadier General, 26 November 1971
- Major General, 14 July 1973
- Major General (Retired), 1 October 1980
