= Thomas W. Kelly =

American Army general

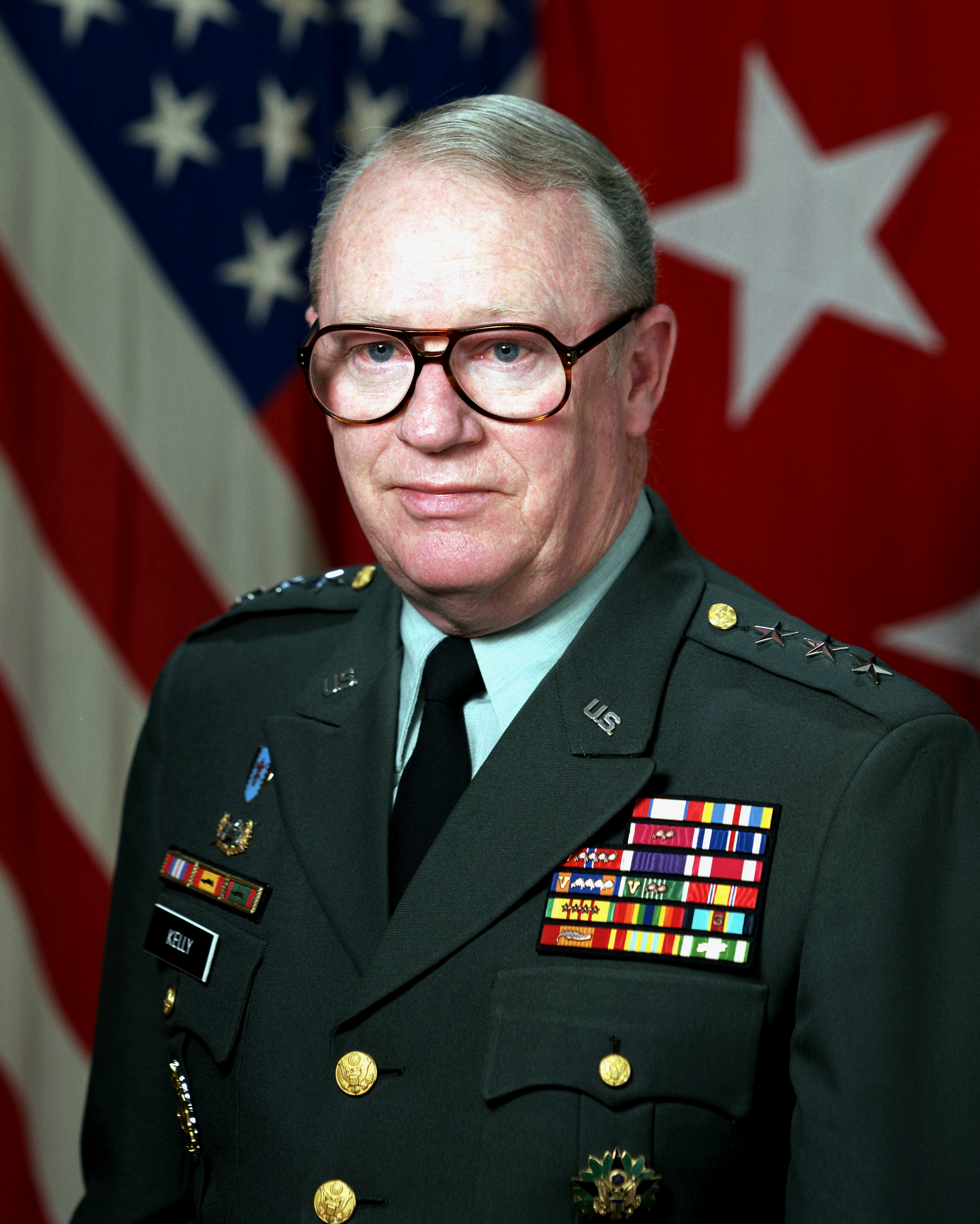
- Born: 16 November 1932; Philadelphia, Pennsylvania, US
- Died: 6 June 2000 (aged 67); Clifton, Virginia, US
- Military career
- Allegiance: United States
- Branch: United States Army
- Service years: 1956–1991
- Rank: Lieutenant General
- Commands: U.S. Army Security Assistance Command; U.S. Army Training Center; 194th Armored Brigade; 1st Battalion, 63rd Armor Regiment
- Conflicts: Vietnam War
- Awards: Defense Distinguished Service Medal; Army Distinguished Service Medal; Defense Superior Service Medal; Legion of Merit (3); Distinguished Flying Cross; Bronze Star Medal (5); Purple Heart; Meritorious Service Medal; Air Medal (5)

Thomas William Kelly (16 November 1932 – 6 June 2000) was a lieutenant general in the United States Army who served as Director for Operations (J3) on the Joint Staff from 1988 to 1991. Responsible for helping to plan the United States invasion of Panama in 1989 and Operation Desert Storm in 1991, he personally conducted the daily Pentagon press briefings at 15:00 U.S. Eastern Time during the Gulf War.

== Early life and education ==
Born in Philadelphia, Kelly attended Temple University and earned a B.S. degree in journalism in 1956. He was commissioned a second lieutenant of armor through the Army ROTC program. Kelly later studied at the Army Command and General Staff College and the Army War College.

== Military career ==
During the Vietnam War, Kelly served in Vietnam in 1967 and 1968 with the 1st Infantry Division. While being transported by helicopter, he was shot down four times and crashed six times.

As a lieutenant colonel, Kelly served as commanding officer of the 1st Battalion, 63rd Armor, 1st Infantry Division (Mechanized) at Fort Riley, Kansas. As a colonel, he was given command of the 194th Armored Brigade at Fort Knox, Kentucky.

As a major general, Kelly served as commanding officer of the U.S. Army Training Center and Fort Dix, New Jersey. After that, he was placed in charge of the U.S. Army Security Assistance Command from August 1987 to January 1988. His promotion to lieutenant general was approved in March 1988.

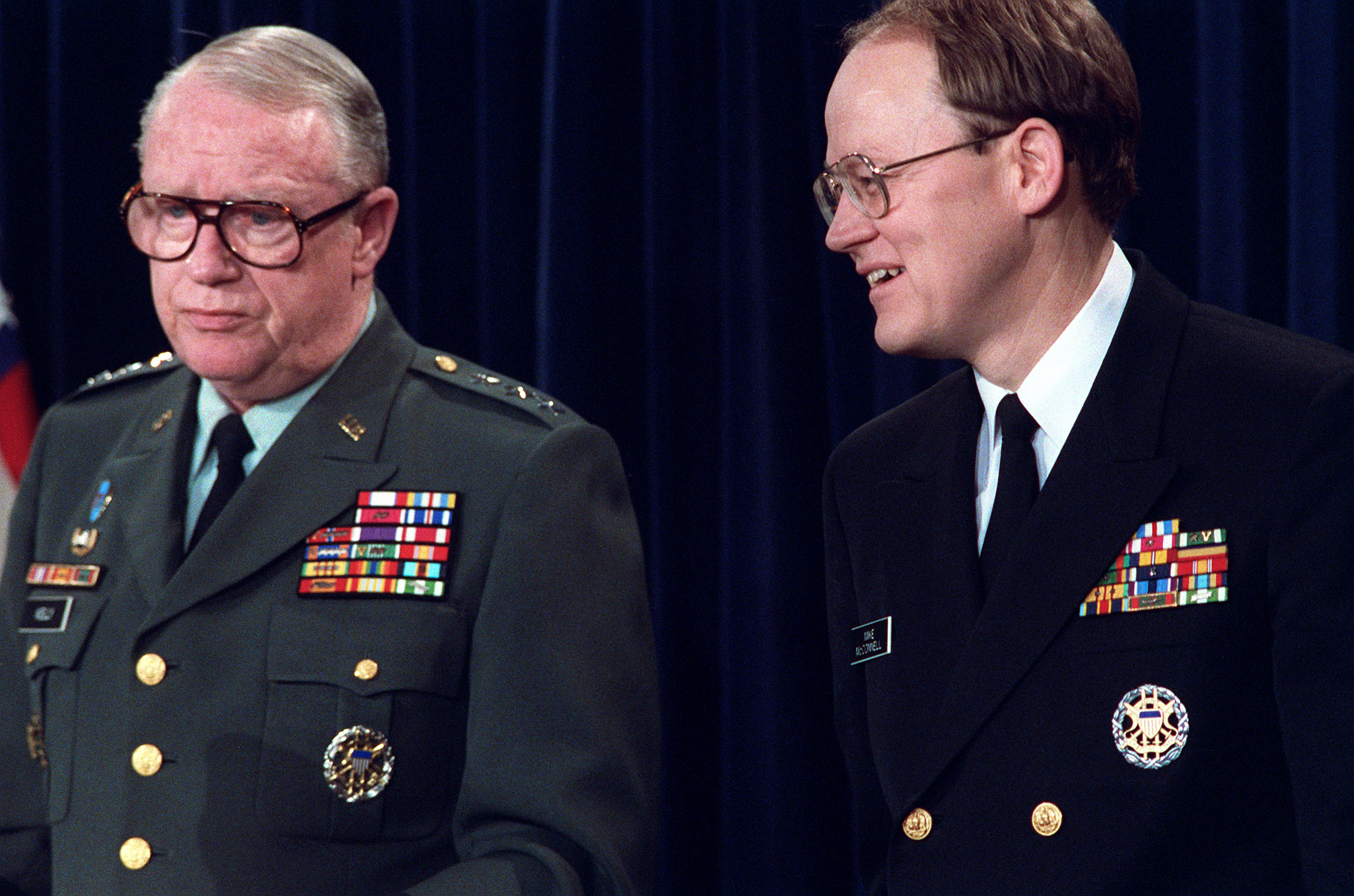
Lt. Gen. Kelly and Joint Staff intelligence director Rear Adm. Mike McConnell during a Gulf War press briefing

During the 1989 Panama invasion and the 1991 Gulf War, Kelly was in charge of the National Military Command Center at the Pentagon. His first experience conducting large press briefings was in 1989. CNN correspondent Wolf Blitzer recalled that "he came across as someone credible and honest."

After the Gulf War, Kelly retired from active duty at the beginning of April 1991.

== Later career ==
After retirement, Kelly embarked on a round of public speaking engagements. His first time flying First Class was to appear on The Tonight Show with Johnny Carson.

In 1995, the American Legion presented him with their Distinguished Service Medal.

== Personal ==
Kelly married Dorothy Mary Bursak in 1957. They had two sons, a daughter and four grandchildren.

After his death in Clifton, Virginia from liver cancer, Kelly was interred at Arlington National Cemetery on 14 June 2000.
