= Michael S. Davison =

United States Army general (1917–2006)

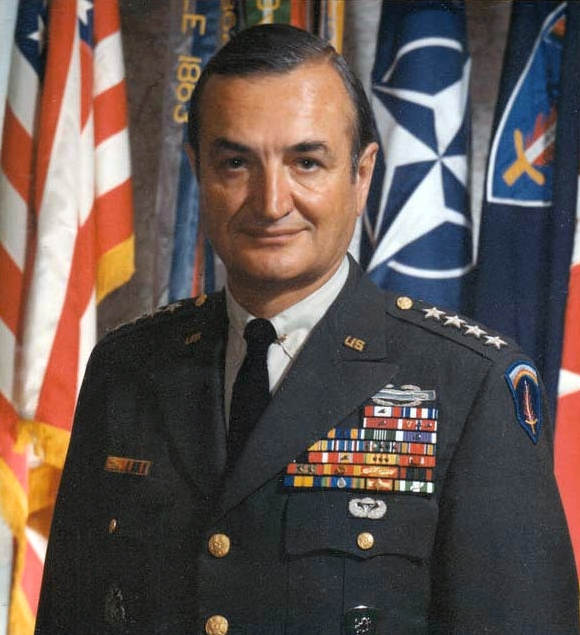
- General Michael S. Davison
- Born: 21 March 1917; San Francisco, California, U.S.
- Died: 7 September 2006 (aged 89); Washington, D.C., U.S.
- Military career
- Allegiance: United States
- Branch: United States Army
- Service years: 1939–1975
- Rank: General
- Commands: United States Army Europe; United States Army Pacific; II Field Force, Vietnam; Command and General Staff College; 1st Battalion, 179th Infantry Regiment
- Conflicts: World War II; Vietnam War
- Awards: Army Distinguished Service Medal (3); Silver Star; Legion of Merit (2); Bronze Star Medal with "V" (2); Air Medal (9); Purple Heart (2)

Michael Shannon Davison (21 March 1917 – 7 September 2006) was a United States Army four-star general, who served as Commander in Chief, United States Army Europe/Commander, Central Army Group from 1971 to 1975.

== Military career ==
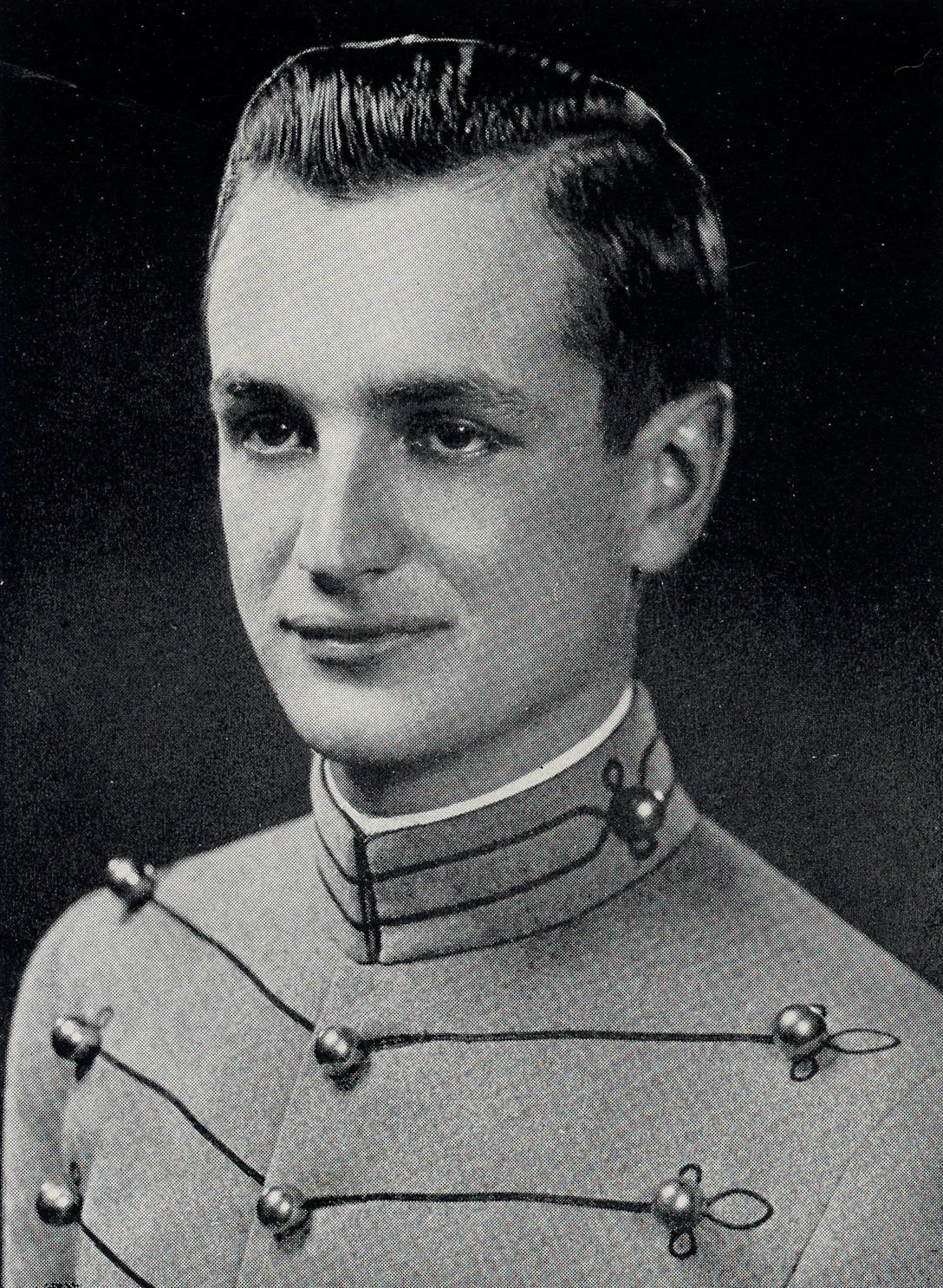
Davison as a West Point cadet in 1939

Davison was born on 21 March 1917, in San Francisco, California, into a military family. He graduated from the United States Military Academy in 1939, receiving his commission in the cavalry. His first posting was at Fort Brown, Texas, with the 12th Cavalry Regiment.

During World War II, Davison was assigned to the Operations Division, War Department General Staff Theater Group, and later reassigned to the 45th Infantry Division in North Africa as Assistant G-2. He remained with the division in Sicily and Italy, to include taking part in the Anzio invasion. At the age of 26, he was chosen to command a battalion, the 1st Battalion, 179th Infantry Regiment. Four months later he was promoted to lieutenant colonel, and he remained commander of the battalion throughout the Italian campaign and the invasion of southern France. During his time with the division he was wounded twice. Towards the end of the war he served as G-2 and G-3 (Operations) at Headquarters, VI Corps.

After the war, then-Colonel Davison was assigned to the Plans Section, Headquarters Army Ground Forces at Fort Monroe, and later took command of the 18th Mechanized Cavalry Squadron stationed in Puerto Rico. He received a master's degree in Public Administration from Harvard University in 1951, and following a stint in the Office, Chief of Legislative Liaison, he was assigned to his alma mater as Commander, First Regiment, United States Corps of Cadets in 1954.

In 1958 Davison graduated from the National War College in 1958, and subsequently served as Chief, Combat Materiel Division, Office, Chief of Research and Development until 1960. He was then chosen to command Combat Command A, 3rd Armored Division, and was later promoted to brigadier general and assigned as Chief of Staff, V Corps. He once again returned to West Point to become the 51st Commandant of Cadets in 1963.

Davison next was assigned as Commandant of the Command and General Staff College, followed by promotion to lieutenant general in 1968, and appointment as Deputy Commander-in-Chief, United States Army Pacific, and subsequently as Chief of Staff for Commander-in-Chief, United States Pacific Command. In 1970, he assumed command of II Field Force, Vietnam, and was responsible for conducting the Cambodian Campaign.

In May 1971, Davison was promoted to general and assigned as Commander-in-Chief, United States Army Europe and concurrently as Commander, Central Army Group, NATO. During his tenure he placed emphasis on race relations and equal opportunity. Because of these efforts, he was awarded the NAACP Meritorious Service Award in 1976. The citation reads:

In recognition of his leadership, courage, and dedication to the principles of human relations, equality of opportunity and justice, which has been the hallmark of his numerous commands in the Army of the United States.

Davison retired from the army in 1975.

== Post-military ==
After retiring from the Army, Davison held various positions in the civilian sector, to include President of the United Service Organizations, Vice President of Joseph R. Loring Associates, an architectural engineering firm, a board member of Mercedes-Benz of North America, Vice Chairman of the Army and Air Force Mutual Aid Association, President of Shannon Enterprises, member of the advisory board of the International Security Council, and Board of Trustees of the Association of Graduates, United States Military Academy, and later its president from 1983 to 1989. He served as chairman of the Board of Army Navy Country Club from 1990 to 1993.

Davison was also responsible for ending the bitter in-fighting over what would constitute the Vietnam Veterans Memorial. It was Davison in January 1982 who suggested the inclusion of a statue, The Three Soldiers, as compromise between parties arguing over whether the memorial would be Maya Lin's black granite wall or a more traditional heroic memorial. Jan Scruggs, president of the Vietnam Veterans Memorial Fund, said "He was a think-out-of-the-box kind of guy. He was also very smart. He waited until the end of the day, when everybody was very tired, before he made his suggestion."

Davison died on 7 September 2006. He was survived by his second wife, Helen Walker Davison, three children, one of whom, retired Lieutenant general Michael S. Davison Jr., also achieved flag rank, 6 grandchildren, and two great-grandchildren. He was preceded in death by his first wife, Jean Miller Davison, who died in 1983, and a daughter who died in 1957.

== Awards and decorations ==
Davison's awards and decorations include the Army Distinguished Service Medal with two oak leaf clusters, the Legion of Merit with oak leaf cluster, the Silver Star, the Bronze Star Medal with "V" and oak leaf cluster, the Air Medal with eight oak leaf clusters, the Purple Heart with oak leaf cluster, the French Legion of Honor, the French Croix de Guerre; the German Grand Cross of Merit; the Bavarian Grand Cross of Merit; and the Royal Order of the King of Thailand, Knight First Class. He also received an honorary Doctor of Law from the University of Maryland, and was made an honorary citizen of Meximieux, France. He was the 1997 recipient of the Distinguished Graduate Award from the Association of Graduates of the United States Military Academy.

== Notes ==
Military offices
Preceded by Arthur S. Collins Jr.	Commanding General of United States Army Europe; 1971–1975	Succeeded by George S. Blanchard
Preceded by Harry J. Lemley Jr.	Commandant of the Command and General Staff College; 1966–1968	Succeeded by John H. Hay
