= Operation Manchester =

Part of the Vietnam War (1967–1968)

- Part of the Vietnam War
Date	4 December 1967 – 17 February 1968
Location	Tân Uyên District, Bình Dương Province, South Vietnam
Result	U.S. operational success

Belligerents
United States	Viet Cong

Commanders and leaders
BG Robert C. Forbes; Lt. Col. William S. Schroeder	

Units involved
199th Infantry Brigade	274th Regiment: D800 Battalion

Casualties and losses
37 killed	US body count: 456 killed

Operation Manchester was a security operation conducted during the Vietnam War by the U.S. 199th Infantry Brigade in Tân Uyên District, South Vietnam from 4 December 1967 to 17 February 1968.

== Background ==
Viet Cong (VC) forces operated a supply network of footpaths and ox trails parallel to the Đồng Nai river through western Tân Uyên District connecting War Zone D to southern Bình Dương Province. This supply route was defended by the Đồng Nai Regiment. Between 22 and 25 November the Đồng Nai Regiment had attacked the Army of the Republic of Vietnam (ARVN) 48th Regiment, 18th Division killing several dozen soldiers.

Brigadier General Robert C. Forbes planned to deploy the 4th Battalion, 12th Infantry to interdict the supply route and allow the ARVN 48th Regiment to extend security over the densely populated hamlets along the banks of the Đồng Nai river.

== Operation ==
On 4 December, 4/12th Infantry commanded by Lieutenant Colonel William S. Schroeder, began landing several kilometers north of Tân Uyên town. That unit together with Battery C, 2nd Battalion, 40th Artillery Regiment began constructing Firebase Nashua (11.143°N 106.82°E).

On the early morning of 6 December, a VC mortar attack hit Firebase Nashua, killing or wounding several Americans. At dawn, two platoons from Company A 4/12th Infantry and a scout dog team searched for the VC southeast of the firebase. That afternoon as the force moved through an area of thick vegetation it was ambushed by the D800 Battalion of the Đồng Nai Regiment in concealed bunkers, with more than 12 U.S. soldiers killed or wounded in the initial fire. Schroeder ordered Company C to assist, together with M113s from Troop D, 17th Cavalry Regiment and called for the Brigade reserve, the 3rd Battalion, 7th Infantry Regiment, to be flown in from Long Binh Post. These reinforcements were able to extract Company A by nightfall, they had suffered 25 killed and 82 wounded and 2 M113s were damaged by mines. 67 VC bodies were recovered.

Following that engagement Forbes reinforced his units, deploying the 3/7th Infantry, into the eastern part of Tân Uyên District, where it established Firebase Keane (11.166°N 106.868°E). A battery of M55 self-propelled howitzers from the 2nd Battalion, 35th Artillery, was deployed to Firebase Nashua. Forbes was also given control of the recently deployed Company F, 51st Infantry Regiment, a Long-range reconnaissance patrol unit.

On 19 December, a team from Company F, 51st Infantry, observed VC troops while patrolling the southern edge of War Zone D. A company from the 4/12th Infantry was landed by helicopter to engage the VC supported by helicopter gunships from the 3/17th Cavalry. The VC withdrew into War Zone D, leaving 49 dead, while U.S. losses were seven dead.

On 27 December, the 4/12th Infantry engaged a company-size VC unit southeast of Firebase Nashua, killing 30 for the loss of three U.S. dead.

== Aftermath ==
The operation concluded on 17 February 1968. VC losses were 456 killed, while U.S. losses were 37 killed. It was considered a success because the U.S. forces had kept the VC away from Tân Uyên town and the Đồng Nai river hamlets and prevented rocket attacks on Long Binh.
