= Frederic E. Davison =

United States Army general

Frederic Ellis Davison
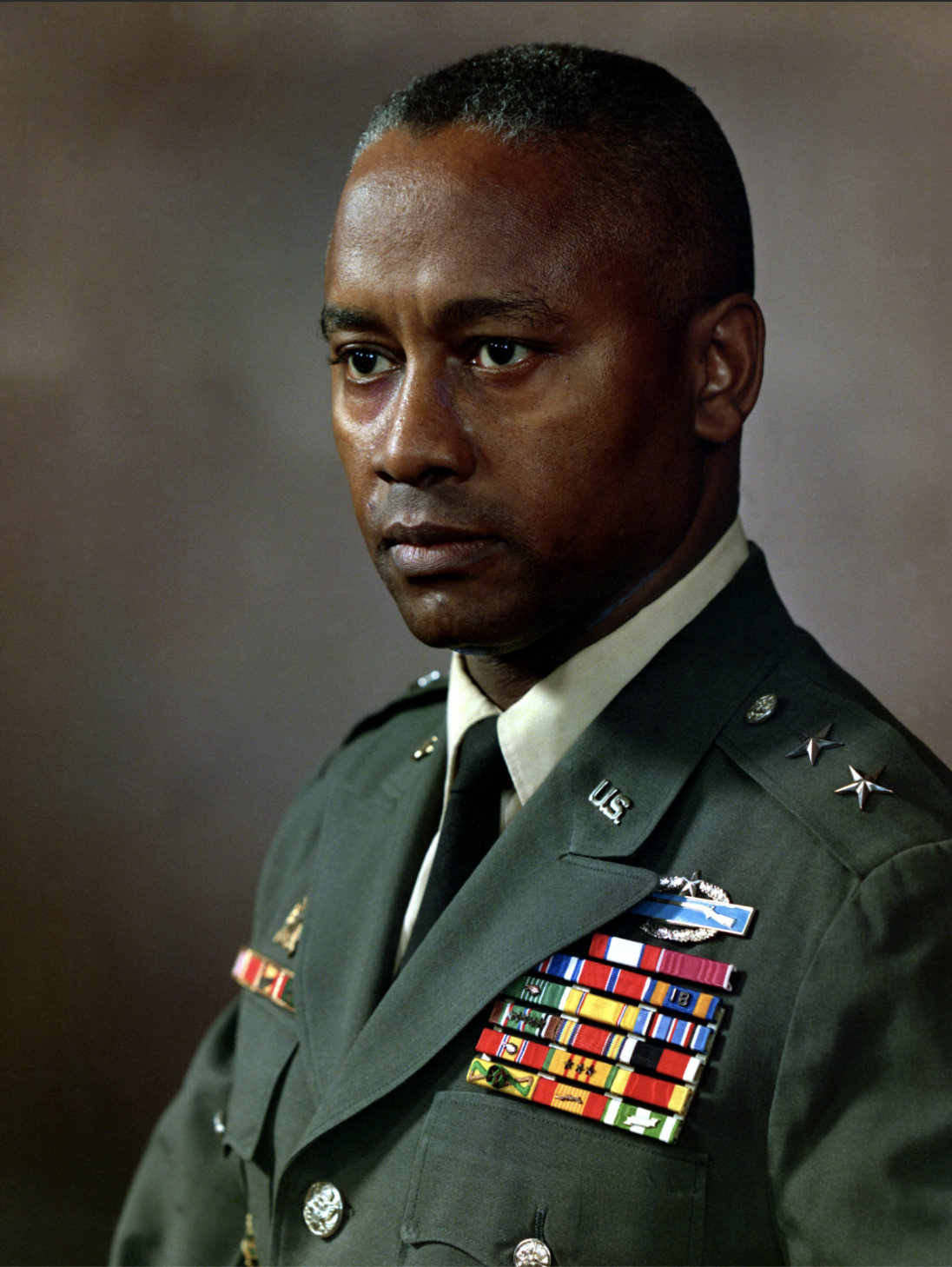
- Born: 28 September 1917; Washington, D.C., United States
- Died: 24 January 1999 (aged 81); Walter Reed Army Medical Center, Washington, D.C., United States
- Burial place: Arlington National Cemetery, Virginia, United States
- Military career
- Allegiance: United States
- Branch: United States Army
- Service years: 1938–1974
- Rank: Major General
- Unit: Infantry Branch
- Commands: 199th Light Infantry Brigade; 8th Infantry Division
- Conflicts: World War II; Vietnam War
- Awards: Army Distinguished Service Medal; Legion of Merit; Bronze Star

Major General Frederic Ellis Davison (28 September 1917 – 24 January 1999) was a United States Army officer and the first African American to reach the rank of major general and become a division commander. After serving in World War II, he served as commander of the 199th Light Infantry Brigade during the Vietnam War.

== Early life and education ==
He was born in Washington, D.C. to Sue Bright Davison and Ellis Charles Davison on 28 September 1917. He attended Dunbar High School and then Howard University, graduating in 1938. He obtained his master's degree in 1940 in chemistry and zoology.

== Military career ==
He was commissioned as a second lieutenant in the Reserve Officers' Training Corps in March 1939. He was called to active duty in March 1941 first serving as a platoon leader in Company H of the 3rd Battalion, 366th Infantry Regiment in the segregated 92nd Infantry Division.

In September 1943, almost two years after the United States entered World War II, he took command of Company H, 366th Infantry before the 92nd Division deployed to Europe to participate in the Italian Campaign. He served in various roles in the 3/366th Infantry and ended the war commanding Company B, 1st Battalion, 371st Infantry Regiment.

He returned stateside in November 1945 and was placed on inactive duty on 30 March 1946. He was recalled to active duty in August 1947 and given command of Company D, 1st Battalion, 365th Infantry Regiment. In April 1952, he deployed to West Germany to join the 370th Armored Infantry Battalion, where he served as operations officer and then executive officer. He attended Command and General Staff College in 1954 and War College in 1962.

Col. Davison was serving as acting commander of the 199th Light Infantry Brigade based at Long Binh Post at the start of the Tet Offensive on 31 January 1968. Davison commanded his forces in the Tet Offensive attacks on Bien Hoa and Long Binh. He was given command of the brigade in August 1968 and shortly thereafter was promoted to brigadier general, becoming only the second African American to achieve this rank.

In May 1972 Davison, now a major general, was given command of the 8th Infantry Division, becoming the first African American division commander. His final assignment commencing in November 1973 was as commander of the Washington Military District. He retired from the Army in 1974 and became executive assistant at Howard University until 1985 when he retired from that role.

Davison died on 24 January 1999 and was buried at Arlington National Cemetery.

Military offices
Preceded by Donald V. Rattan	Commanding General 8th Infantry Division; 1972–1973	Succeeded by Joseph C. McDonough
