= Robert C. Forbes =

United States Army general

- Born: July 17, 1917; Camden, New Jersey
- Died: March 18, 2002 (aged 84)
- Burial place: Arlington National Cemetery
- Military career
- Allegiance: United States of America
- Branch: United States Army
- Service years: 1938–1973
- Rank: Major general
- Commands: 199th Light Infantry Brigade
- Conflicts: World War II; Vietnam War
- Awards: Distinguished Service Medal; Silver Star; Legion of Merit; Bronze Star

Robert Charles Forbes (1917–2002) was a United States Army major general who served as commander of the 199th Light Infantry Brigade during the Vietnam War.

== Early life and education ==
He attended William Penn High School and then graduated from the University of Pennsylvania in 1939.

== Military service ==
=== World War II ===
He served with the 63rd Infantry Division seeing action in France and Germany.

=== Post WWII ===
Forbes was promoted to Brigadier General in July 1966 and appointed assistant division commander of the 9th Infantry Division.

=== Vietnam War ===
BG Forbe deployed to South Vietnam with the 9th Infantry Division in December 1966. He was then reassigned to be chief of staff of II Field Force, Vietnam.

In September 1967 when BG John F. Freund was wounded on operations, Forbes was given command of the 199th Light Infantry Brigade and commanded that unit until May 1968.

During the Tet Offensive Forbes led his Brigade in ejecting the Viet Cong from Saigon.

=== Post Vietnam ===
From September 1968 to September 1969 he served as commander of United States Army Security Assistance Command.

He retired from the Army in 1973.

== Personal life ==
He married Anne Catherine Eckenrode in 1942 and they had 3 sons and a daughter.
