= Tet Offensive attacks on Bien Hoa and Long Binh =

Part of the Vietnam War (1968)

- Part of The Tet Offensive of the Vietnam War
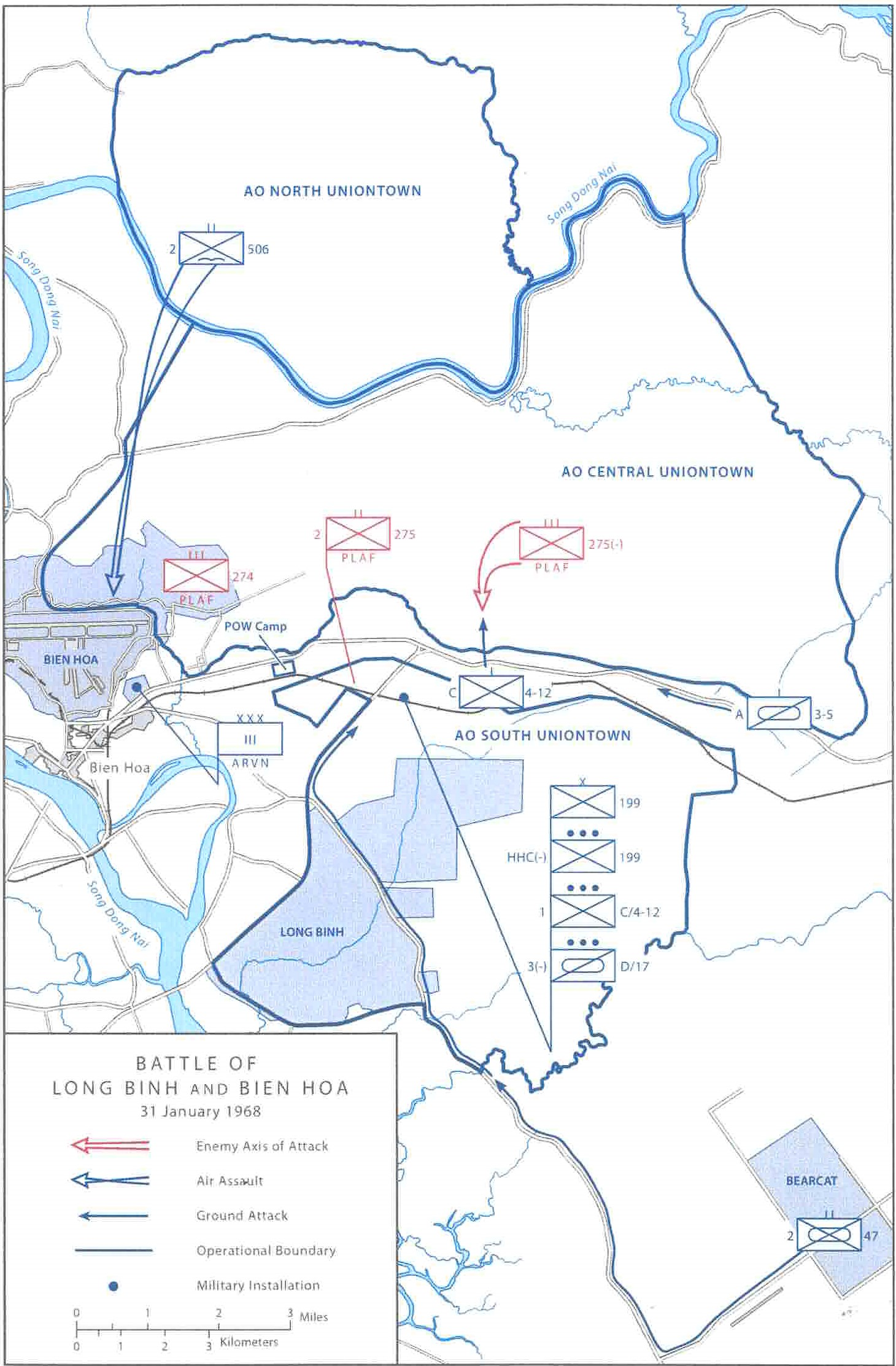
- Tet Offensive attack on Long Binh and Bien Hoa, 31 January 1968
Date	31 January – 2 February 1968
Location	Bien Hoa, Bien Hoa Air Base and Long Binh Post, South Vietnam 10.977°N 106.832°E
Result	US/South Vietnamese victory

Belligerents
United States; South Vietnam	Viet Cong; North Vietnam

Commanders and leaders
(United States) LG Frederick C. Weyand; Col. Frederic E. Davison (South Vietnam) General Lê Nguyên Khang	

Units involved
(United States) 199th Light Infantry Brigade; 1st Brigade, 9th Infantry Division; 720th Military Police Battalion (South Vietnam) III Corps Headquarters; 5th Division; 53rd Regional Force Battalion; 3rd Ranger Group	5th Division: 274th Regiment; 275th Regiment; Bien Hoa Sapper Company (Vietnam) 84A Artillery Regiment

Casualties and losses
(United States) 11 killed	527 killed 47 captured

The attacks on Biên Hòa, Bien Hoa Air Base and Long Binh Post, occurred during the early hours of 31 January 1968 and continued until 2 February 1968. The attacks by Vietcong (VC) and People's Army of Vietnam (PAVN) forces were one of several major attacks around Saigon in the first days of the Tet Offensive. The attacks were repulsed with the PAVN/VC suffering heavy losses, having inflicted minimal damage on the bases.

== Background ==
By 1968 the Bien Hoa-Long Binh complex was the largest US/South Vietnamese military base in South Vietnam. Bien Hoa Air Base was the largest air base in the country, home to over 500 United States Air Force (USAF) and Republic of Vietnam Air Force (RVNAF) aircraft, while Long Binh Post was the US Army's largest logistics base, headquarters of United States Army Vietnam (USARV), the II Field Force, Vietnam, the 199th Light Infantry Brigade (199th LIB) and the 12th Aviation Group and home to over 20,000 US personnel. In addition to the US bases, the city of Biên Hòa was the headquarters of the Army of the Republic of Vietnam (ARVN) III Corps and home to a large prisoner of war camp.

The ARVN 53rd Regional Force Battalion was responsible for security in the countryside around Biên Hòa. In Biên Hòa itself the 3rd Ranger Task Force, consisting of the 35th and 36th Ranger Battalions, provided a rapid reaction force supported by 2 155-mm howitzer battalions located on the southeast of the city. Within Bien Hoa AB, the USAF 3rd Security Police Squadron was responsible for security manning bunkers and operating mobile patrols within the base perimeter.

The US 199th LIB was responsible for security in the towns and countryside around Long Binh, while the 720th Military Police Battalion was responsible for security within the base perimeter. II Field Force commander LG Frederick C. Weyand had also ordered the 9th Infantry Division to be prepared to send its 1st Brigade from Bearcat Base 16 km south of Long Binh to Bien Hoa-Long Binh in the event of an attack. Weyand also requested the 1st Australian Task Force (1 ATF) to defend the eastern approaches to Long Binh/Bien Hoa and 1 ATF had commenced Operation Coburg on 24 January.

The 179th Military Intelligence Detachment of the 199th LIB had been gathering intelligence on a pending attack on Long Binh for several weeks before the attacks based on human intelligence and ground radar. As a result long-range reconnaissance patrols (LRRPs) from Company F, 51st Infantry Regiment were positioned north of Long Binh to detect PAVN/VC approaching the base. In the week preceding the attack these LRRP patrols engaged two PAVN/VC reconnaissance teams north of Long Binh.

The Tết ceasefire began on 29 January, but was cancelled on 30 January after the VC/PAVN prematurely launched attacks in II Corps and at 17:30 the 7th Air Force commander General William W. Momyer ordered all air bases in South Vietnam to security condition red.

== Battle ==
At 00:30 on 31 January, a patrol from Company E, 4th Battalion, 12th Infantry Regiment detected a company-size PAVN/VC force approximately 10 km north of Bien Hoa, moving in the direction of Bien Hoa AB. Company E engaged the PAVN/VC supported by artillery fire killing 47 PAVN/VC.

At 01:00, a six-man LRRP from Company F, 51st Infantry Regiment spotted PAVN/VC moving through rubber trees several hundred meters to the north of Long Binh Post. Helicopter gunships took off from Bien Hoa AB to investigate, but were unable to locate the force in the darkness.

At 03:00, the PAVN 84A Artillery Regiment began a barrage of approximately 100 82-mm. mortar rounds and 90 122-mm. rockets at Bien Hoa AB and Long Binh Post. This fire was observed by the helicopter gunships that had been circling the area north of Long Binh and they quickly moved to attack the launch sites and were soon joined by an AC-47 Spooky gunship and their combined fire soon stopped the rocket/mortar fire. The rocket/mortar attack was the signal to start the ground assaults on Bien Hoa AB and Long Binh.

=== Attack on Bien Hoa Air Base ===
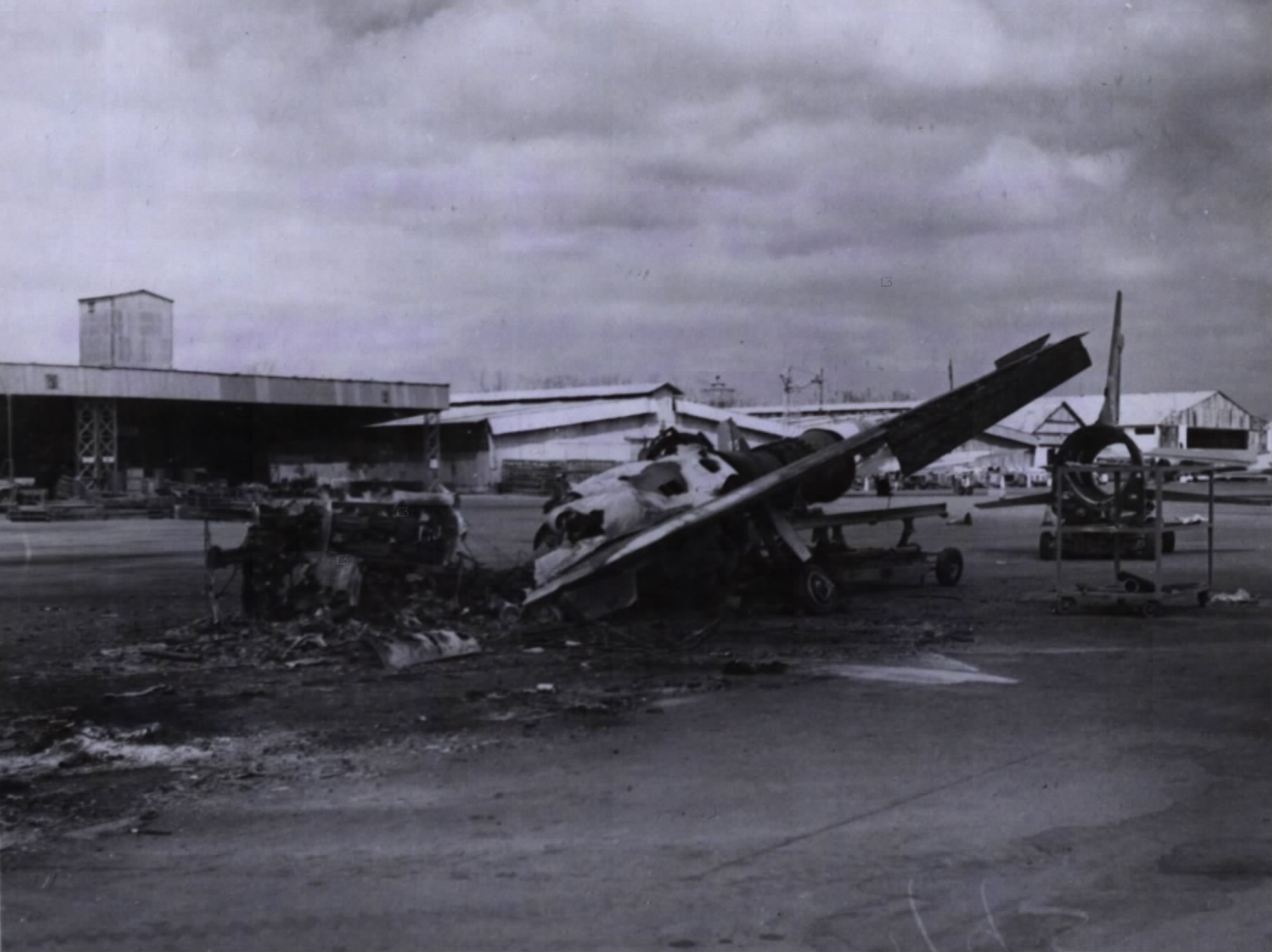
F-100 Super Sabre destroyed by VC mortar fire

As the rockets hit Bien Hoa AB, two battalions of the VC 274th Regiment emerged from a rubber plantation 500m east of the eastern perimeter of Bien Hoa AB. VC informants inside the base had provided detailed information as to the base layout and defenses. The VC concentrated their attack on Bunker 10, an old French concrete bunker on the eastern perimeter, hitting it with Rocket-propelled grenades (RPGs) and mortar fire, however the Security Police in Bunker 10 and adjacent bunkers fought back keeping the VC from penetrating far into the base. Captain Reginald V. Maisey Jr. of the 3rd Security Police Squadron was posthumously awarded the Air Force Cross for leading the defense of Bunker 10.

At dawn several AH–1 Cobra gunships from the 334th Assault Helicopter Company joined the defense spraying the VC with rockets and machine gun fire which started fires causing the VC assault to lose its impetus.

The perimeter was strengthened by an ad hoc force of support personnel from the 145th Aviation Battalion (then known as 145th Combat Aviation Battalion) and just before midday the ARVN 57th Regional Force Battalion moved through the base and counterattacked the VC forcing them to withdraw east into the rubber plantation leaving behind over 100 dead.

With the base returned to full operation, that afternoon C–130s landed the 2nd Battalion, 506th Infantry Regiment to help ARVN forces fighting the VC in Biên Hòa city.

At approximately 16:45 F-100 Super Sabres of the 531st Tactical Fighter Squadron conducted a Napalm strike against a PAVN/VC company at the east end of the base runway.

USAF losses were four killed in action with another dying of a heart attack, while 26 were wounded. PAVN/VC losses were 137 killed and 25 captured. One A-37 and one F-100 were destroyed while a further 17 aircraft were damaged.

=== Attack on Long Binh Post ===
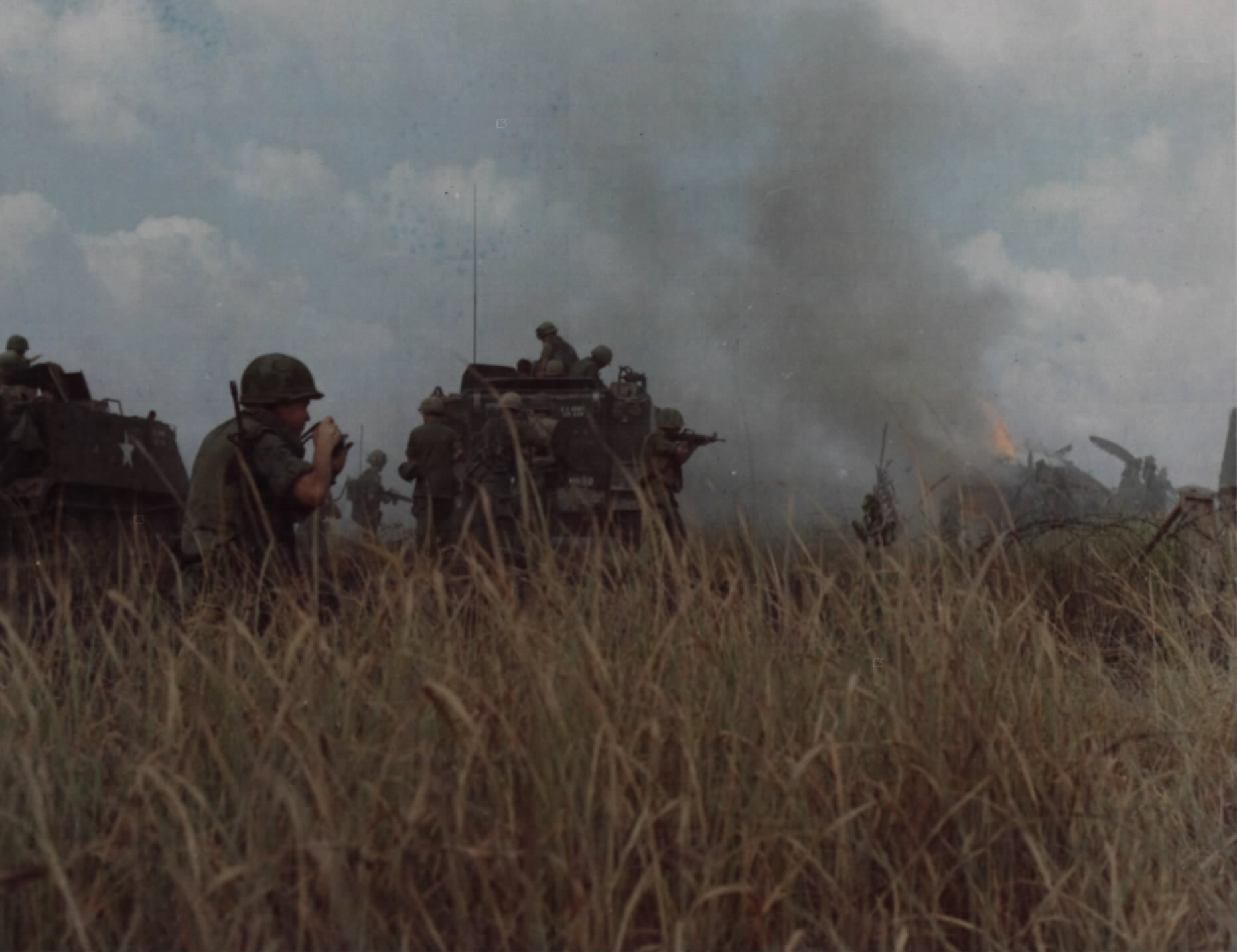
Mechanized Infantry engage VC northeast of Long Binh, 31 January 1968

Several dozen of the PAVN rockets exploded near the II Field Force and 199th LIB headquarters in the Plantation Compound (10.9577°N 106.878°E) causing minimal damage. The acting commander of the 199th LIB, Col. Frederic E. Davison, ordered three of his infantry companies operating north of Long Binh to attack the rocket launch site, while Weyand ordered the 9th Infantry Division to send the 1st Brigade from Bearcat Base.

The VC 275th Regiment had taken up positions in a residential area known at the Widows' Village (10.9587°N 106.877°E), which housed the wives and families of dead ARVN soldiers and was located across Route 316 from the Plantation Compound. A VC commander captured later in the battle revealed that his orders were only to start the attack after several hundred rockets had hit the Plantation, but as the rocket sites had been neutralized before the rocket threshold was reached, the ground assault on the Plantation never began. Instead at approximately 03:30 the VC began firing across the road at the Plantation Compound being met by return fire from the perimeter bunkers. Some VC crossed Route 316 and took up firing positions in bush at the southern perimeter of the Plantation.

At 04:00 a 60-man VC sapper team penetrated the northeastern perimeter of the base killing three MPs and entered the massive ammunition dump (10.946°N 106.91°E) where they planted eighteen Satchel charges before being forced to withdraw by the 720th Military Police Battalion. Bomb squads disarmed seven of the charges, but at 04:30 the remainder exploded with three igniting pallets of artillery shells and their Propellant bags causing a massive explosion, blast wave and mushroom cloud. However the ammunition storage bunkers prevented a chain reaction and the lost munitions were easily replaced with no impact on supply.

At approximately 05:30, the 2nd Battalion, 47th Infantry Regiment, mounted on M113 Armored Cavalry Assault Vehicles (ACAVs) coming from Bearcat approached the Plantation from the southwest and formed a skirmish line to engage the VC, while helicopter gunships from the 3rd Squadron, 17th Cavalry Regiment swept in to rocket and machine gun the VC positions. At 08:00 the VC south of the Plantation withdrew into the Widows’ Village. Company B, 2nd Battalion, 39th Infantry Regiment had arrived by helicopter from Bearcat and joined up with 2/47th Infantry to sweep the Widows’ Village. By late afternoon the 275th Regiment retreated north, leaving over 200 dead. US losses in the fighting in the Widow's Village were three dead.

=== Ho Nai ===
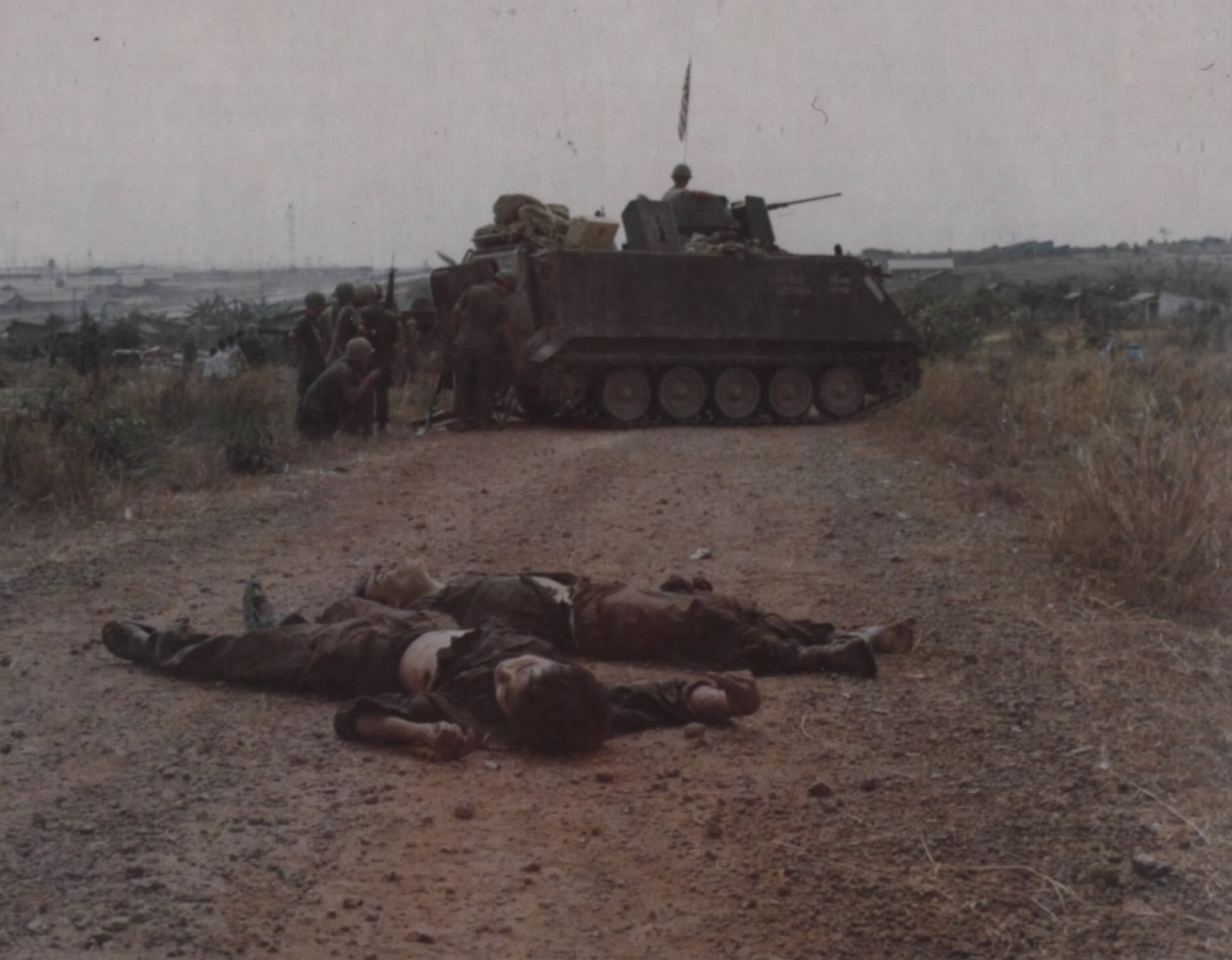
Dead VC near Long Binh

The town of Ho Nai (10.970°N 106.893°E) was located on Highway 1 north of the Widow's Village and Long Binh Post. Its predominantly Catholic population was made up of many Vietnamese who fled North Vietnam in 1954 after the Viet Minh victory.

When the Company F, 51st Infantry LRRP team reported PAVN/VC moving past their position a reaction force from Company C, 4/12th Infantry mounted on ACAVs was sent to investigate. The unit left their position at Firebase Concord north of Biên Hòa and moved east proceeding along trails north of Ho Nai towards the LRRP position. At 03:45 the unit engaged the VC/PAVN with two ACAVs being quickly knocked out by RPG fire. By dawn the VC/PAVN were retreating northwards pursued by helicopter gunships and at 06:15 Company C, 4/12th Infantry began moving north in pursuit, intending to pin the PAVN/VC against a force from Company B, 2nd Battalion, 3rd Infantry Regiment which was moving south. At 07:30 the VC/PAVN force stopped and made a stand in a cemetery where they continued to be hit by the gunships and the ACAVs of Company C. At 08:00 Company C was joined by a force from 2/47th Infantry and they proceeded to methodically kill all the PAVN/VC in the cemetery. After the cemetery had been cleared Company B, 2/3rd Infantry joined Company C, 4/12th Infantry and they made a night defensive perimeter north of Ho Nai, while the 2/47th Infantry was withdrawn to Biên Hòa.

In the late afternoon of 31 January after clearing the Widow's Village 2/47th Infantry advanced into Ho Nai from the south, the town appeared deserted. As the 2/47th Infantry approached the town a Vietnamese warned that it contained many VC and the VC then launched an ambush on the column knocking out 3 ACAVs with RPGs setting off a four-hour battle as the US forces engaged the VC position and rescued the survivors in the damaged ACAVs. By the evening the 2/47th Infantry withdrew into the Long Binh perimeter.

On 1 February Company B, 2/3rd Infantry, Company C, 4/12th Infantry and elements of 2/47th Infantry swept Ho Nai finding only dead VC/PAVN and civilians who had been murdered by the VC or killed in the fighting in the town.

On the evening of 1 February three platoons from Company C, 4/12th Infantry and two platoons from Company D, 17th Cavalry Regiment were ordered 2 km north of Ho Nai to establish an outer defense against any renewed VC/PAVN attack. The VC/PAVN attacked the position that night in a six hour long assault which was met initially by US mortar and artillery fire, then helicopter gunships and then napalm strikes. A force from Company C, 2/3rd Infantry mounted on ACAVs was sent north from Ho Nai and pinned the VC/PAVN in a crossfire. At dawn on 2 February the US counted approximately 50 PAVN/VC dead in the area and captured three VC.

=== Biên Hòa ===
A PAVN/VC attack on the prisoner of war camp in Biên Hòa which held over 2000 prisoners was repulsed by a platoon from Company C, 4/12th Infantry and a platoon from Company D, 17th Cavalry and their ACAVs. 26 PAVN/VC were killed in the attack and several captured.

== Aftermath ==
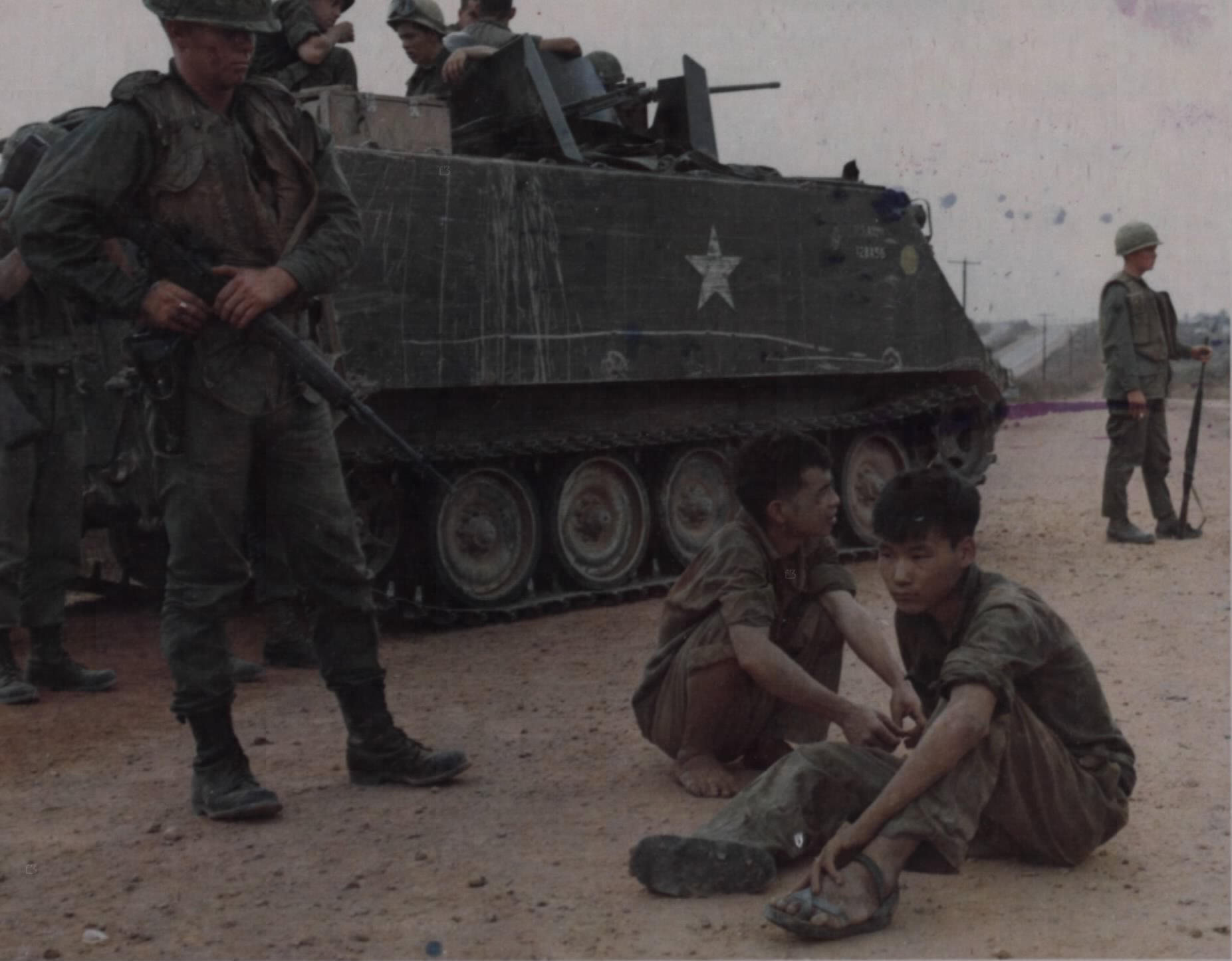
VC prisoners near Long Binh, 31 January 1968

The PAVN/VC attacks were a failure, with losses of 527 dead. Other than temporarily disrupting operations at Bien Hoa AB for half a day and destroying ammunition at the Long Binh ammunition dump, the PAVN/VC inflicted minimal damage to the Bien Hoa-Long Binh complex.

Weyand later noted that in their attacks on the Saigon area "Despite the large number of Communist troops committed, insufficient force was applied in any one area to take and hold the objective...The assault had been launched piecemeal and it was repulsed piecemeal in a series of relatively small battles."

The Tet offensive attacks on Bien Hoa AB and Tan Son Nhut Air Base slowly led to an improvement in air base defense across South Vietnam, with improved bunkers and heavier defensive armament including 0.50 cal machine guns, M67 recoilless rifles and M29 mortars. The gun-jeeps were progressively replaced by M113s and XM-706 Commando armored cars. However the PAVN/VC never made another ground attack on an air base and moved to attacks by fire with rockets, mortar and artillery.

The Tet Offensive attacks and previous losses due to mortar and rocket attacks on air bases across South Vietnam led the Deputy Secretary of Defense Paul Nitze on 6 March 1968 to approve the construction of 165 "Wonderarch" roofed aircraft shelters at the major air bases. In addition airborne "rocket watch" patrols were established in the Saigon-Bien Hoa area to reduce attacks by fire.
