= Michael Lee Lanning =

United States Army officer and author (born 1946)

- Born: September 18, 1946
- Died: April 2, 2024 (aged 77)
- Occupation: writer

Michael Lee Lanning (September 18, 1946 – April 2, 2024) was a U.S. Army lieutenant colonel and the author of military non-fiction.

== Early life and education ==
Lanning was born September 18, 1946, in Sweetwater, Texas.

- Trent High School, Trent, Texas 1964
- Texas A&M University, College Station, TX, BS Agricultural Education, 1968.
- East Texas State University, Commerce, TX, MS Journalism 1977
- U.S. Army Command and General Staff College, Fort Leavenworth, KS, 1979

== Personal life ==
In 2003, Lanning was diagnosed with kidney cancer. He underwent treatment at M.D. Anderson Cancer Center.

He died April 2, 2024.

== Military career ==
Upon graduation from Texas A&M in 1968, Lanning was commissioned a second lieutenant and received infantry, airborne, and ranger training at Fort Benning, Georgia. After a tour as a platoon leader in the 82nd Airborne Division at Fort Bragg, NC, he reported to Vietnam where he served as an infantry platoon leader, reconnaissance platoon leader, and rifle company commander in the 2nd Battalion, 3rd Infantry, 199th Light Infantry Brigade. Subsequent tours of duty took him throughout the United States and Germany as he served as an instructor in the U.S. Army Ranger School, a mechanized infantry company commander in the 3rd Infantry Division, and executive officer of an infantry battalion in the 1st Cavalry Division. Non-command assignments included Public Affairs Officer for the 1st Cavalry Division and I Corps and the plans officer for the American Forces Information Service.

== Military decorations and badges ==
- Defense Meritorious Service Medal
- Bronze Star Medal for Valor
- Bronze Star Medal with one oak leaf cluster.
- Meritorious Service Medal with two oak leaf clusters
- Air Medal
- Army Commendation Medal
- National Defense Service Medal
- Vietnam Service Medal
- Army Service Ribbon
- Overseas Service Ribbon
- Vietnam Campaign Medal
- Republic of Vietnam Gallantry Cross Unit Citation
- Combat Infantryman Badge
- Senior Parachutist Badge
- Ranger Tab
- Expert Infantryman Badge

== Writing career ==
Lanning is the author or co-author of 30 non-fiction books on military history, sports, and health. More than a million copies of his books are in print in fifteen countries, and editions have been translated into eleven languages. He has appeared on major television networks and the History Channel as an expert on the individual soldier on both sides of the Vietnam War. His books have been reviewed by The New York Times where he was described as "a prime example" of a "good infantry officer". He was "one of the youngest company commanders" in the Vietnam War. His book about the firing of Mike Leach at Texas Tech (Double T - Double Cross) was written upon request from his publisher. It drew his interest because of his roots in the west Texas panhandle, where he was born.

Books

- The Only War We Had: A Platoon Leader's Journal of Vietnam New York: Ivy Books/Random House, 1987.
- Vietnam 1969-1970: A Company Commanders Journal New York: Ivy Books/Random House, 1988.
- Inside the LRRPs: Rangers in Vietnam New York: Ivy Books/Random House, 1988.
- Inside Force Recon: Recon Marines in Vietnam (with Ray Stubbe) New York: Ivy Books/Random House, 1989.
- The Battles of Peace New York: Ivy Books/Random House 1992.
- Inside the VC and NVA: The Real Story of North Vietnam's Armed Forces (with Dan Cragg), New York, Fawcett Columbine, 1992.
- Vietnam at the Movies New York: Fawcett Columbine, 1994.
- Senseless Secrets: The Failures of U.S. Military Intelligence From George Washington to the Present. New York: Birch Lane, 1996.
- The Military 100: A Ranking of the Most Influential Military Leaders of All Time. New York: Citadel, 1996.
- The African-American Soldier: From Crispus Attucks to Colin Powell. New York: Birch Lane, 1997.
- Inside the Crosshairs: Snipers in Vietnam New York: Ballantine, 1998.
- Defenders of Liberty: African-Americans in the Revolutionary War New York: Kensington, 2000.
- Blood Warriors: American Military Elites New York: Ballantine, 2002.
- The Battle 100: The Stories Behind History's Most Influential Battles Naperville, IL: Sourcebooks, 2003.
- Mercenaries: Soldiers of Fortune From Ancient Greece to Today's Private Military Companies. New York; Ballantine, 2005.
- The Civil War 100: The Stories Behind the Most Influential Battles, People, and Events of the War Between the States. Naperville, IL: Sourcebooks, 2006.
- The Revolutionary War 100: The Stories Behind the Most Influential Battles, People, and Events of the American Revolution. Naperville, IL: Sourcebooks, 2008.
- Double T Double Cross. Scottsdale, AZ: Scottsdale Book Publishing, 2011.
- At War With Cancer. (with Linda Moore-Lanning) Crystal Beach, TX: Bolivar Roads Press, 2014.
- Tours of Duty: Vietnam War Stories. Mechanicsburg, PA: Stackpole, 2014.
- Tony Buzbee: Defining Moments. Houston, TX: John M. Hardy Press, 2014.
- The Veterans Cemeteries of Texas. College Station, TX: Texas A&M University Press, 2018.
- Dear Allyanna: An Old Soldier's Last Letter to His Granddaughter. Houston, TX: John M. Hardy Press, 2018
- The Court Martial of Jackie Robinson: The Baseball Legend's Battle for Civil Rights During World War II. Lanham, MD: Stackpole Books, 2020.
- The Blister Club: The Extraordinary Story of the Downed American Airmen Who Escaped to Safety in World War II. Lanham, MD: Stackpole Books, 2021.
- Hispanic Medal of Honor Recipients. College Station, TX: Texas A&M University Press, 2021.
- Jewish Medal of Honor Recipients. College Station, TX: Texas A&M University Press, 2021
- Patton in Mexico: Lieutenant George S. Patton, the Hunt for Pancho Villa, and the Making of a General. Lanham, MD: Stackpole Books, 2022.
