= John F. Freund =

National Guard of the United States general

General John Frederick Freund
- John Frederick Freund
- Born: April 27, 1918; New York City, New York
- Died: March 22, 2001 (aged 82); New York City, New York
- Spouse: Margaret McCallum
- Military career
- Allegiance: United States of America
- Branch: United States Army
- Rank: Major General
- Nickname: Fritz
- Commands: Connecticut State Militia
- Website: www.ct.gov/mil

John Frederick Freund (April 27, 1918 – March 22, 2001) was the thirty-sixth Adjutant General of the State of Connecticut.

== Early life and education ==
Freund was born in New York City, New York on April 27, 1918. Raised in Scarsdale, New York, he was appointed to the U.S. Naval Academy where he was a varsity swimmer. Freund graduated with a B.S. degree in June 1940, at which was the same time he entered the service.

== Military career ==
An eye problem kept him from the Navy. Freund was commissioned as a Regular Army Second Lieutenant in the Artillery, and after, attended the Artillery School. He served as a battery officer and battery commander from 1941 to 1942. From April 1943 to July 1945, he served as executive officer and battalion commander of combat units in the European Theater of Operations. Freund's battalion was deactivated because of cessation of hostilities and he was assigned to Theater Service Forces, European Theater.

In 1946, Freund represented HQ, Army Ground Forces as Liaison Officer for Guided Missiles at the Wright-Patterson Air Development Center. He then entered the Graduate School of Engineering at the University of Southern California in 1947, earning an M.S. degree in mechanical engineering two years later. In 1949, Freund was assigned to the 1st Guided Missile Regiment, Fort Bliss, Texas, where he served until July 1952 as battalion commander, group officer, group executive officer and group commanding officer. He graduated from the United States Army Command and General Staff College in 1953. During 1953 to 1957, Freund was assigned to the Weapons Systems Evaluation Group, Office of the Secretary of Defense, as an army member and guided missile specialists.

After graduation from the National War College in 1961, Freund remained in the Washington area, serving for one year on the Department of the Army General Staff and two subsequent years with the Office of the Joint Chiefs of Staff.

In September 1964 he served as adviser to Army of the Republic of Vietnam Brigadier General Nguyễn Hữu Có, the commander of II Corps and he arguably played a key role in defusing the Buôn Ma Thuột rebellion by the United Front for the Liberation of Oppressed Races. During his time in South Vietnam, he performed duties as Deputy Senior Corps Advisor, Director of Training for Military Assistance Command, Vietnam (MACV), assistant director of the Joint United States Public Affairs Office, Special Assistant to the COMUSMACV General William Westmoreland and finally as commander of the 199th Light Infantry Brigade. Freund was wounded in August 1967 during an assault operation in Operation Fairfax and was brought back to the U.S. in early September.

In October 1967, he was assigned to West Germany where he served as Chief of Staff of VII Corps. Frocked as a brigadier general, his promotion was confirmed by the United States Senate on July 19, 1968. In January 1969 he returned to the U.S. where he was assigned to Washington D.C., serving as Special Assistant for Counter Insurgency and Special Activities, office of the Joint Chief of Staff, until August 1969. He served as Deputy Assistant Chief of Staff for Intelligence, Department of the Army, until July 1971. On July 16, 1971, Freund was reassigned to Stewart Field, New York where he assumed command of the First Region, U.S. Army Air Defense Command.

He was appointed Connecticut Adjutant General by Thomas J. Meskill in 1972 until 1982. During this assignment, he increased the National Guard budget and many armories were built, including the one that now stands in New Britain, Connecticut.

== Awards ==
His awards included the Distinguished Service Medal with one Oak Leaf Cluster, a Silver Star, the Legion of Merit with two Oak Leaf Clusters, the Bronze Star with one Oak Leaf Cluster and Combat "V", a Purple Heart and the Air Medal with twelve Oak Leaf Clusters. He was also awarded seven campaign ribbons and ten foreign decorations.

== Personal life ==
John Freund married Margaret McCallum on September 6, 1947. They had three sons; John F. Freund, Peter C. Freund, and Bruce R. Freund. On March 22, 2001, Freund died of cancer in the home of a son in New York.

He was buried at Arlington National Cemetery on April 5, 2001. His wife died two months later and was interred beside him on June 26, 2001.

Military offices
Preceded by E. Donald Walsh	Connecticut Adjutant General; 1972–1982	Succeeded by John F. Gore
