= Bien Hoa prisoner of war camp =

South Vietnamese military prison and POW camp during Vietnam war

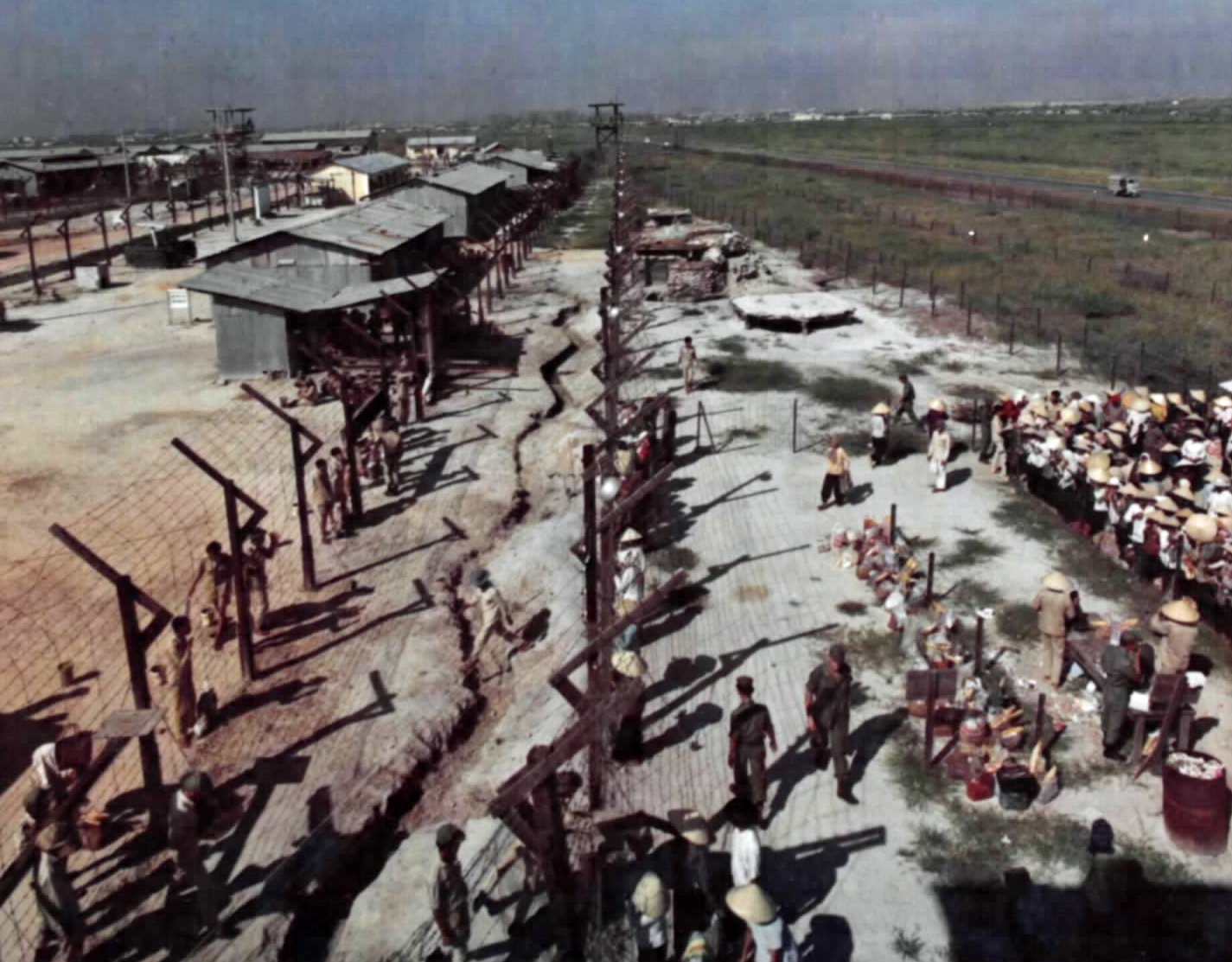
- Bien Hoa POW Camp perimeter fence, November 1968

Site information
- Controlled by: Army of the Republic of Vietnam
- Condition: abandoned

Location
- Coordinates: 10.968°N 106.864°E

Site history
- In use: 1966–1975
- Battles/wars: Tet offensive attacks on Bien Hoa and Long Binh

Bien Hoa prisoner of war camp was a military prison in Bien Hoa, South Vietnam.

== History ==
On 27 November 1965 the United States and South Vietnamese Joint Military Committee proposed a workable plan for application of the Geneva Convention on Prisoners of War by the U.S., South Vietnamese and Free World forces. The plan called for the construction of five prisoner of war camps, one in each Corps Tactical Zone and one in the Capital Military District (Saigon), each having an initial capacity of 1,000 prisoners. Each camp would be staffed by South Vietnamese military police with U.S. military police prisoner of war advisers also assigned to each camp. The plan was approved in December 1965, a temporary prisoner of war camp was to be established at Bien Hoa in early January 1966, with permanent prisoner of war camps to follow. The Bien Hoa camp in III Corps was opened in May, the Pleiku camp in II Corps was completed in August and the Da Nang camp in I Corps was opened in November. Late in the year work was begun on the Can Tho camp in IV Corps.

In early 1966, as a result of U.S. efforts, representatives of the International Committee of the Red Cross (ICRC) visited the camp while it was under construction. In August 1966 the completed camp was again visited by ICRC representatives who were favorably impressed with the camp and agreed to provide health and welfare items on their next visit.

During the Tet offensive attacks on Bien Hoa and Long Binh a People's Army of Vietnam (PAVN)/Vietcong (VC) force attacked the camp. The attack was repulsed by a platoon from Company C, 4/12th Infantry and a platoon from Company D, 17th Cavalry and their M113 Armored Cavalry Assault Vehicles. Twenty-six PAVN/VC were killed in the attack and several captured.

By 11 March 1968 more than 1,300 VC aged between 11 and 18 were in South Vietnamese custody. In April 1968 steps were taken to concentrate all VC prisoners of war under age 18 at the Bien Hoa camp where under the Youth Rehabilitation Program they received indoctrination, education and vocational training which included woodworking, tailoring, brick-making and gardening.

On 25 March 1973, during the return of POWs as part of the Paris Peace Accords, 210 PAVN POWs from the camp refused repatriation to North Vietnam.

On 3 June 1974 PAVN/VC rockets hit the prison, killing 29 and wounding 63, most of those killed were female political prisoners and their children.
