= Long Binh Post =

US military base in Vietnam

- Long Bình, Đồng Nai
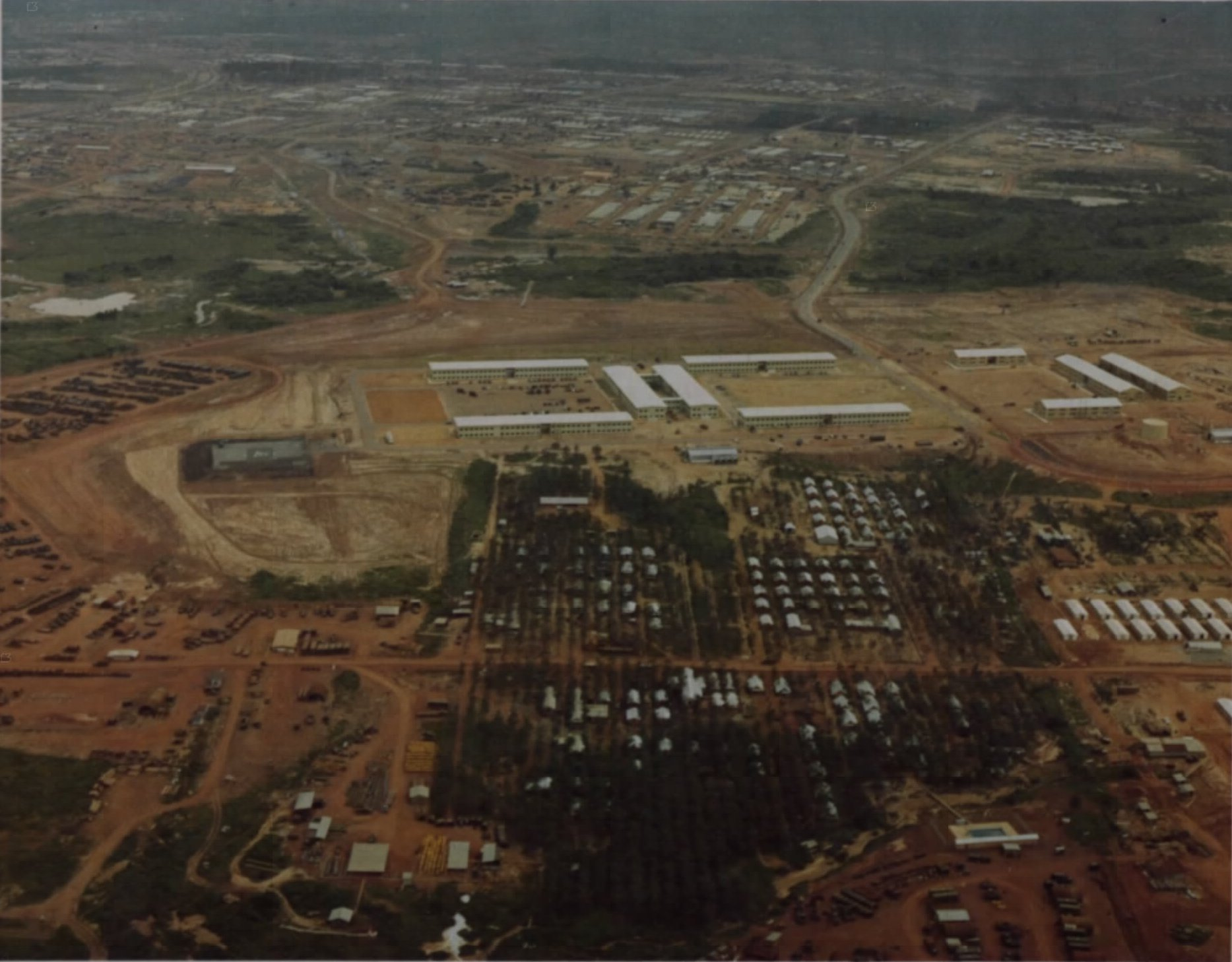
- Long Binh Post in October 1967

Site information
- Type: Army Base
- Condition: Seized in April 1975 by the PAVN, now an industrial/techno-park

Location
- Coordinates: 10.910°N 106.870°E

Site history
- Built: circa 1965
- In use: 1965–1975
- Battles/wars: Vietnam War

Garrison information
- Occupants: United States Army Vietnam; II Field Force; US Army Engineer Command, Vietnam; 1st Logistical Command; 199th Light Infantry Brigade; 1st Aviation Brigade; 20th Engineer Brigade; 1st Signal Brigade; 18th Military Police Brigade; 44th Medical Brigade; 60th Replacement Battalion; 615th Military Police Company; 24th Evacuation Hospital; 93rd Evacuation Hospital

Sanford Army Airfield
- IATA: none; ICAO: none

Summary
- Elevation AMSL: 120 ft (37 m)
- Interactive map of Sanford Army Airfield

Runways
Direction	Length		Surface
Direction	ft	m	Surface
	3,200	975	Asphalt

Long Binh Post (Tổng kho Long Bình) is a former U.S. Army base located in Long Bình, Đồng Nai between Biên Hòa and Saigon, Vietnam. The base functioned as a U.S. Army base, logistics center, and major command headquarters for United States Army Vietnam (USARV). Long Binh Post was also unofficially known as "Long Binh Junction", influenced by the widely used initials of then-President Lyndon B. Johnson.

== History ==
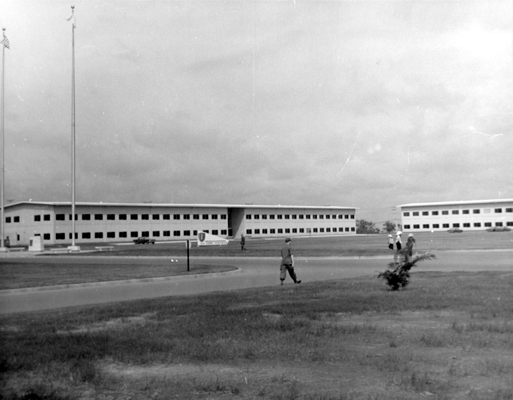
The U.S. Army Republic of Vietnam (USARV) Headquarters building at Long Binh during the Vietnam War.

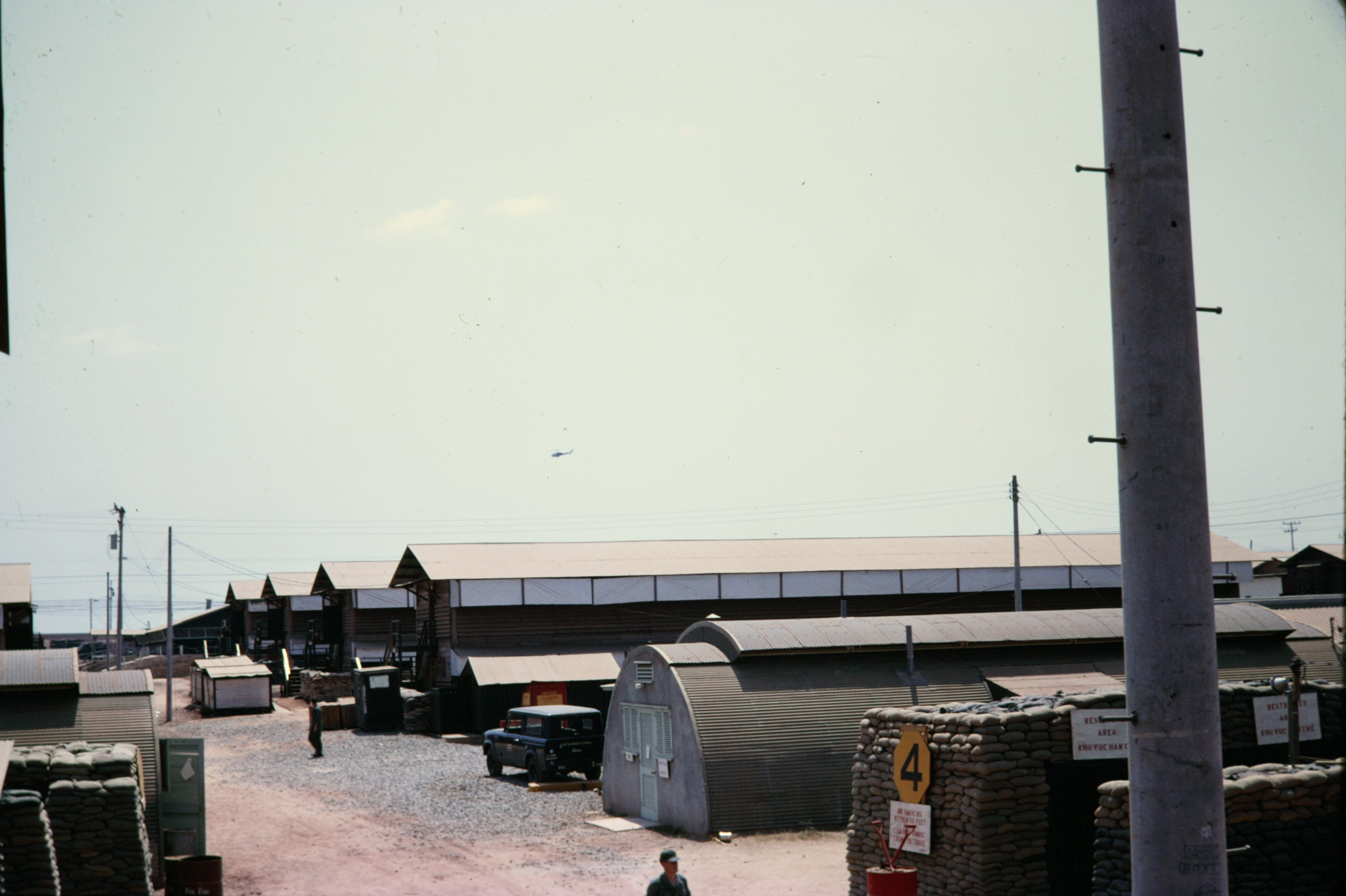
Barracks for the enlisted men working at USARV Headquarters

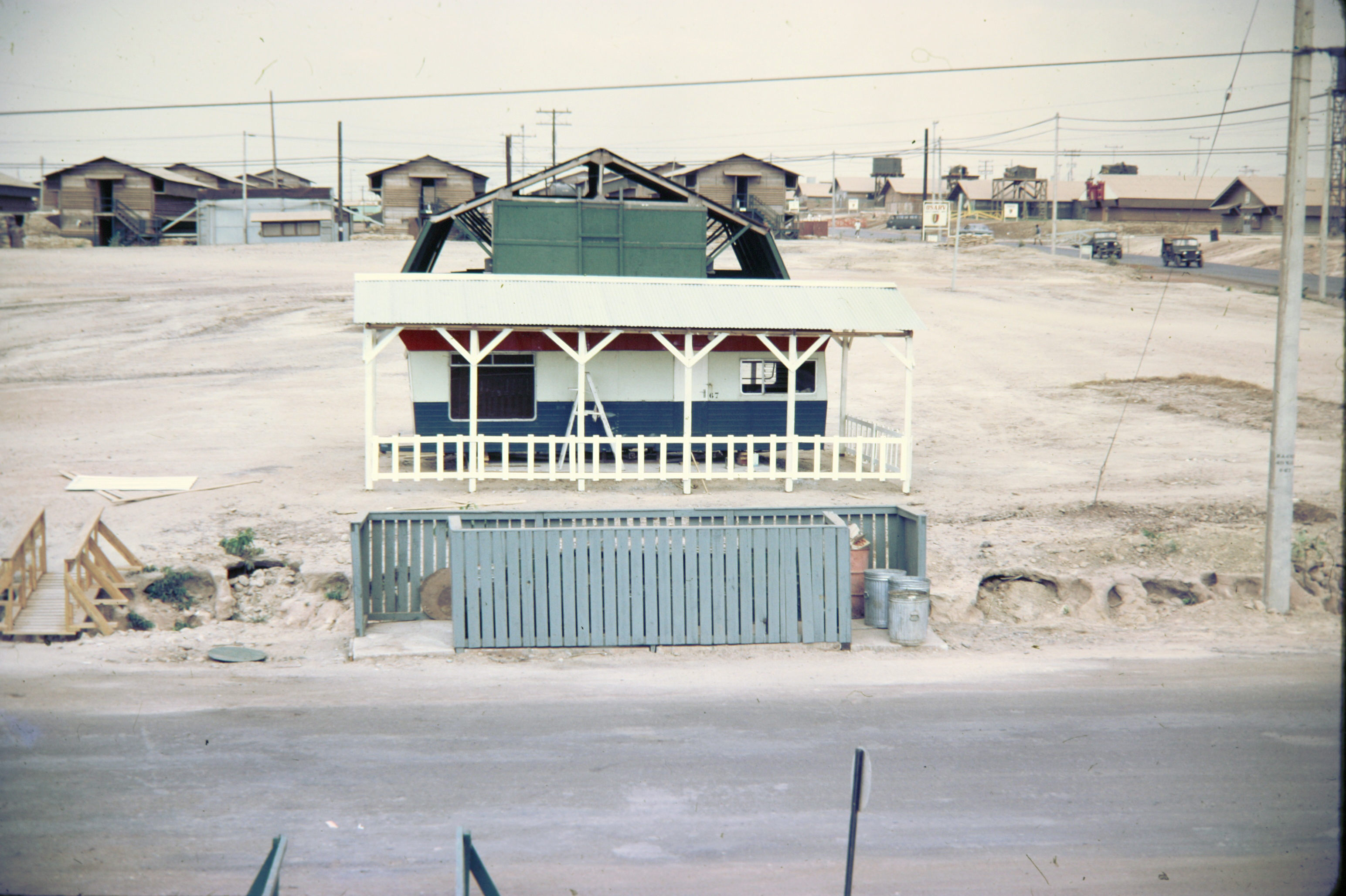
Movie theater, behind the reenlistment office, for USARV Headquarters staff

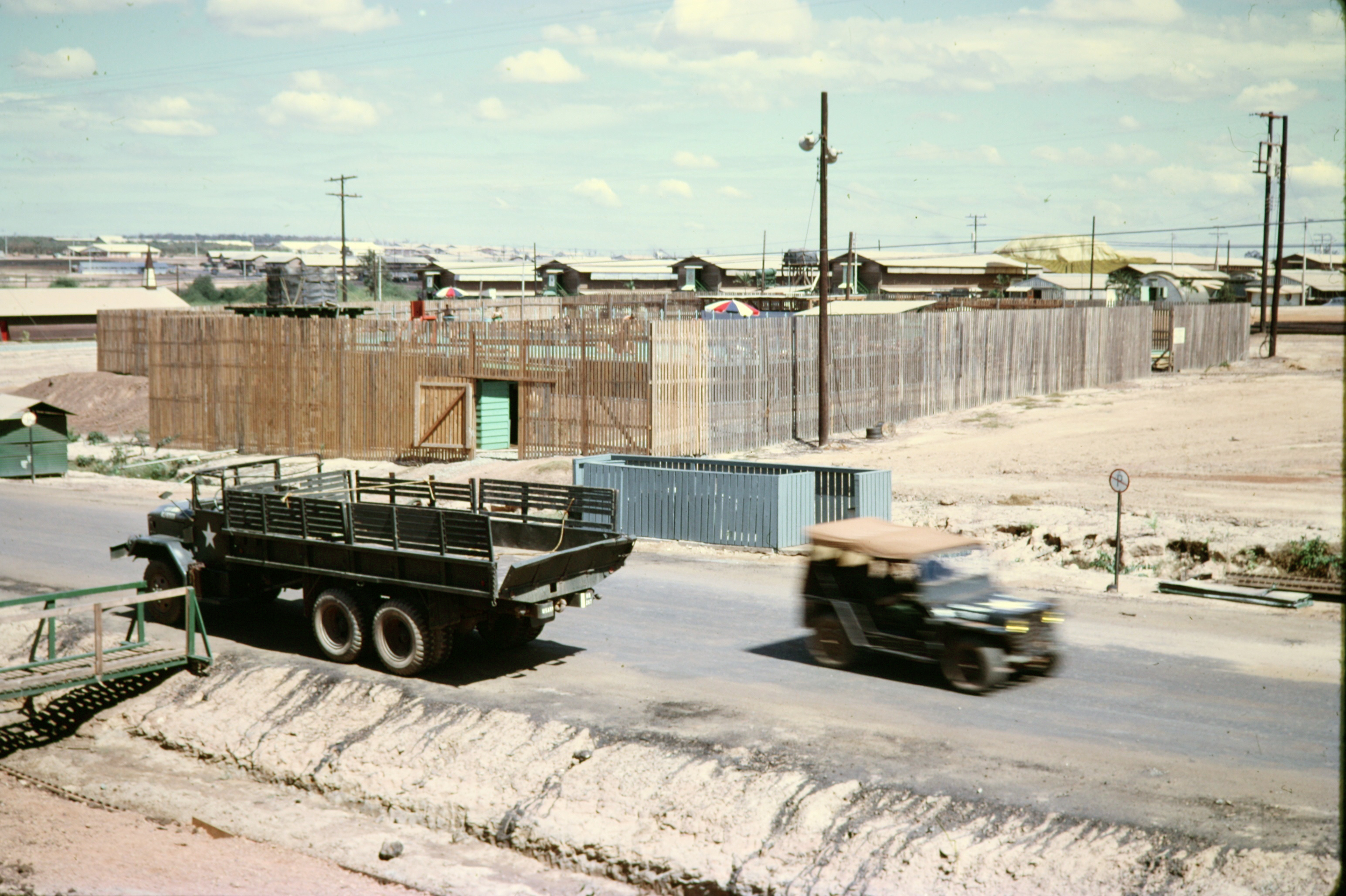
Swimming pool for USARV Headquarters staff

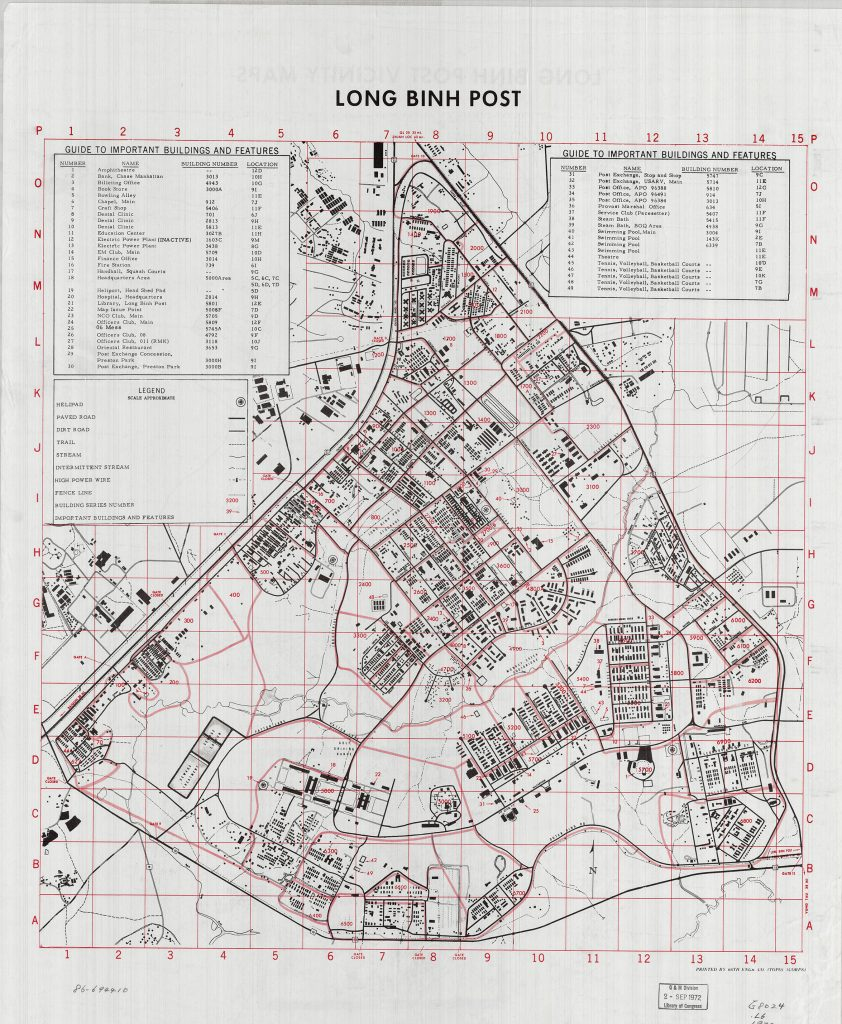
A map of Long Binh Post 1972

Long Binh Post was located on the east of Đồng Nai river, 20 km northeast from Saigon and 7 km southeast from Biên Hòa Air Base.

With the buildup of U.S. forces in South Vietnam, it was recognized that the continued influx of troops into Saigon would soon exceed its capability to absorb them and that usable real estate and facilities were not available in the Saigon area. The 1st Logistical Command was tasked with developing a short range plan to absorb the influx of troops, and a long range plan that would ultimately move the bulk of U.S. Army personnel out of the Saigon area. A thorough reconnaissance was made and the Long Binh area was selected for the establishment of a major logistical and administrative base.

A master base development plan was prepared, which provided areas for all activities in Saigon. General William Westmoreland, who was both Military Assistance Command, Vietnam (MACV) commander and Commanding General USARV, was briefed on the study and approved it in principle. He moved the headquarters of USARV to Long Binh. The headquarters of MACV remained in the Saigon area.

The 1st Logistical Command immediately began implementing the study by locating the ammunition depot, hospital, engineers, plus direct support and general support supply and maintenance support at Long Binh. The movement of headquarters activities was delayed by the requirement for $2 million to develop an adequate communication system in the area and by the time required for installation of the system.

By mid-1967, USARV, 1st Logistical Command and many other Army units dispersed in Saigon had moved to Long Binh Post, resolving centralization, security, and troop billeting issues. Long Binh Post was a sprawling logistics facility and the largest U.S. Army base in Vietnam, with a peak of 60,000 personnel in 1969.

The Viet Cong attacked the Long Binh ammunition supply point on 4 February 1967 destroying at least 15,000 high explosive 155 mm artillery rounds. The base was attacked again during the 1968 Tet Offensive as well as the 1969 Tet attacks.

Following the Tet Offensive attacks, over a period of two weeks, the 159th Engineer Group utilized the assets of all four of its construction battalions in constructing the Long Binh Post perimeter defense system. It consisted of 19,200 meters of double row, triple concertina fence, 19,000 meters of access road, 77 firing bunkers and 16 twenty-two man reserve force bunkers.

=== Major units ===
The II Field Force, 18th Military Police Brigade, 199th Light Infantry Brigade, 44th Medical Brigade, 20th Engineer Brigade, US Army Engineer Command, Vietnam and the 93rd and 24th Evacuation Hospitals were located on Long Binh Post. Logistics was provided by the 266th Supply and Service Battalion which provided graves registration; clothing and equipment; petroleum, oil, and lubricants (POL); and construction supplies for the III Corps Area in Vietnam.

Another unit was the 90th Replacement Battalion, a first stop for newly arrived U.S. Army enlisted personnel, who were then permanently assigned to other units in Vietnam. Long Binh Post included the Long Binh Stockade, a U.S. Army prison, from 1966 to the 1970s, also known unofficially as "LBJ" or "Long Binh Jail"

The 1st Aviation Brigade was headquartered at Sanford Army Airfield (10.915°N 106.894°E) on the post.

=== Post facilities ===
Long Binh Post had dental clinics, large restaurants, snack bars, and a Special Services Crafts Shop that provided crafts, photo lab, wood shop, lapidary, leather crafting and silver/gold casting classes. Facilities included post exchanges, swimming pools, basketball and tennis courts, a golf driving range, University of Maryland extension classes, a bowling alley, many nightclubs (officer, NCO, enlisted) with live music, a Chase Manhattan Bank branch, laundry services, and a massage parlor. The base and its facilities were handed over to the Army of the Republic of Vietnam on 11 November 1972.

=== Post Vietnam War ===
The area formerly occupied by the Long Binh post is now Long Bình ward, which as of 2008 is largely given over to industrial use, known as Long Binh Techno Park and a shopping complex.
