= II Field Force, Vietnam =

Corps-level command of the U.S. Army during the Vietnam War

- II Field Force, Vietnam shoulder sleeve insignia
- Active: 1966–1971
- Country: United States of America
- Allegiance: United States Army
- Type: Command
- Size: Corps
- Part of: Military Assistance Command, Vietnam
- Headquarters: Long Binh
- Engagements: Vietnam War

Insignia
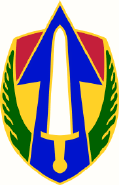
- Distinctive unit insignia

II Field Force, Vietnam was a United States Army corps-level command during the Vietnam War.

Activated on 15 March 1966, it became the largest corps-level command in Vietnam and one of the largest in Army history. II Field Force was assigned the lineage of the XXII Corps, a World War II corps in the European Theater of Operations. II Field Force was a component of U.S. Military Assistance Command Vietnam (MACV) and had its headquarters in Long Binh.

== Area of responsibility ==
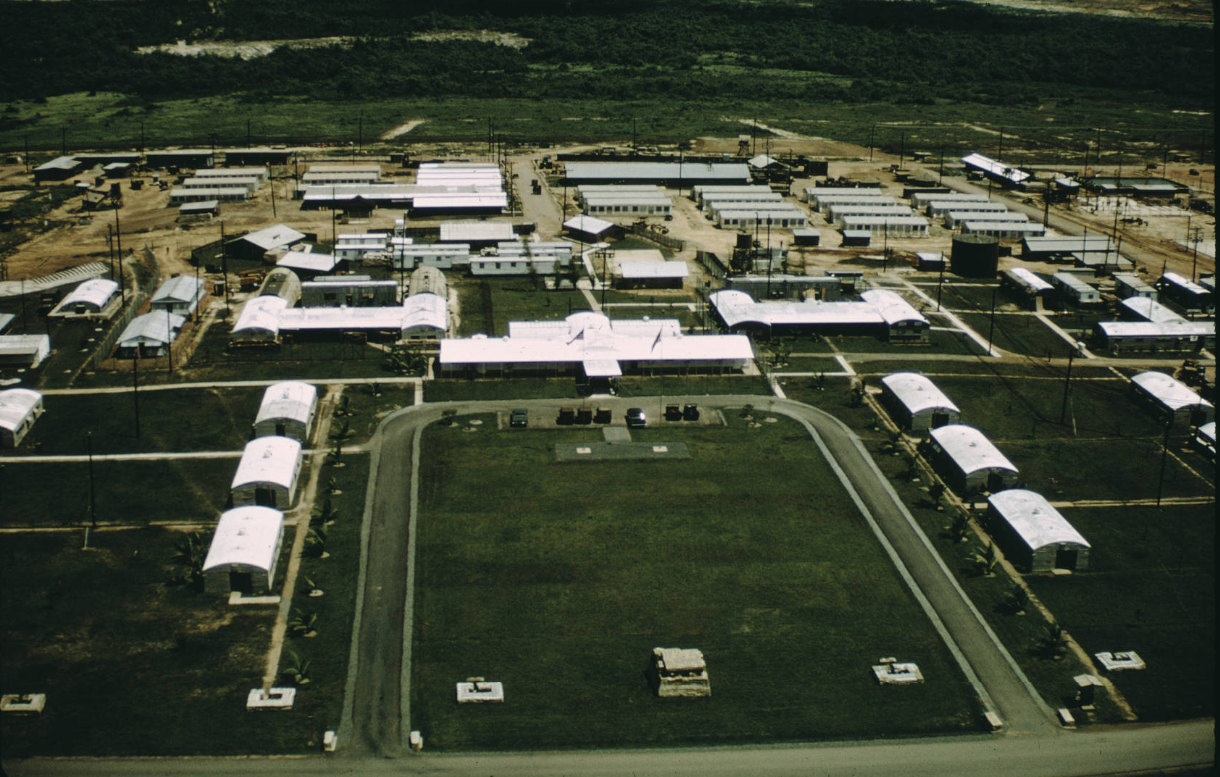
II Field Force Vietnam HQ, Long Binh Post, 27 September 1967

II Field Force's area of responsibility was III Corps Tactical Zone, later renamed Military Region 3, which comprised eleven provinces surrounding Saigon. This was designed to mimic the ARVN III Corps region. II Field Force controlled units participating in the 1968 Tet Offensive and the 1970 Cambodian Incursion.

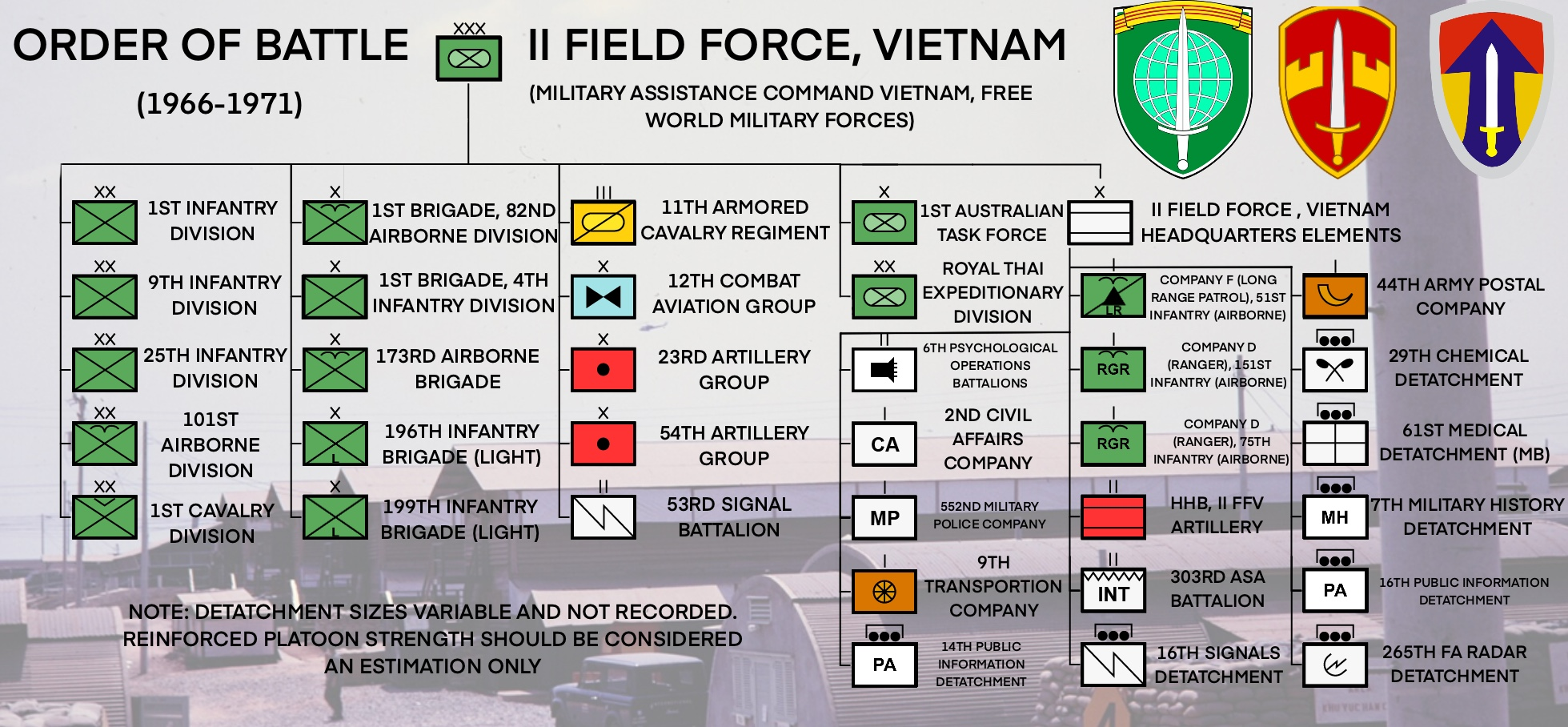
Order of Battle for II Field Force, Vietnam. 1966-1971

== Units assigned ==
At various times during the Vietnam War, II FFV controlled the following units:

- 1st Infantry Division
- 9th Infantry Division
- 25th Infantry Division
- 1st Cavalry Division (Airmobile)
- 3rd Brigade 82nd Airborne Division
- 3rd Brigade, 4th Infantry Division (Reassigned to 25th Infantry Division August 1967)
- 173rd Airborne Brigade
- 196th Light Infantry Brigade
- 199th Light Infantry Brigade
- 11th Armored Cavalry Regiment
- 12th Combat Aviation Group
- 23rd Artillery Group
- 54th Artillery Group
- 108th Artillery Group
- 53rd Signal Battalion
- 1st Australian Task Force
- Royal Thai Army Volunteer Force

II Field Force Vietnam Headquarters Elements:

- Company F (Long Range Patrol) 51st Infantry (Airborne)
- Company D (Ranger) 151st Infantry (Airborne), Indiana National Guard
- Company D (Ranger) 75th Infantry (Airborne)
- HHB, II FFV Artillery
- 303rd ASA Battalion
- 6th Psychological Operations Battalion
- 2nd Civil Affairs Company
- 552 Military Police Company
- 9th Transportation Company
- 44th Army Postal Company
- 29th Chemical Detachment
- 61st Medical Detachment (MB)
- 7th Military History Detachment
- 219th Military Intelligence Detachment
- 14th Public Information Detachment
- 16th Public Information Detachment
- 16th Signal Detachment
- 265th FA Radar Detachment (AN/TPS-25)

== Inactivation ==
II Field Force was inactivated on 2 May 1971, during the withdrawal of U.S. ground combat forces from Vietnam, with its assets providing the basis for its successor, Third Regional Assistance Command (TRAC).

== Commanders ==
- Lieutenant General Jonathan O. Seaman (March 1966 – March 1967)
- Lieutenant General Bruce Palmer Jr. (March–July 1967)
- Lieutenant General Frederick C. Weyand (July 1967 – August 1968)
- Lieutenant General Walter T. Kerwin Jr. (August 1968 – April 1969)
- Lieutenant General Julian J. Ewell (April 1969 – April 1970)
- Lieutenant General Michael S. Davison (April 1970 – May 1971)

== Lineage and honors ==
=== Lineage ===
- Constituted 9 January 1944 in the Army of the United States as Headquarters and Headquarters Company, XXII Corps.
- Activated 15 January 1944 at Fort Campbell, Kentucky.
- Inactivated 20 January 1946 in Germany.
- Allotted 12 July 1950 to the Regular Army.
- Redesignated 5 January 1966 as Headquarters and Headquarters Company, II Field Force.
- Activated 10 January 1966 at Fort Hood, Texas.
- Redesignated 15 March 1966 as Headquarters and Headquarters Company, II Field Force Vietnam.
- Inactivated 3 May 1971 at Fort Hood, Texas.
- Redesignated 2 September 1982 as Headquarters and Headquarters Company, XXII Corps.

=== Campaign participation credit ===
- World War II
  - Central Europe
- Vietnam
  - Counteroffensive
  - Counteroffensive, Phase II
  - Counteroffensive, Phase III
  - Tet Counteroffensive
  - Counteroffensive, Phase IV
  - Counteroffensive, Phase V
  - Counteroffensive, Phase VI
  - Tet 69/Counteroffensive
  - Summer- Fall 1969
  - Winter- Spring 1970
  - Counteroffensive, Phase VII

=== Honors ===
- Meritorious Unit Commendation (Army), streamer embroidered VIETNAM 1966–1967
- Meritorious Unit Commendation (Army), streamer embroidered VIETNAM 1967–1969
- Meritorious Unit Commendation (Army), streamer embroidered VIETNAM 1969
- Meritorious Unit Commendation (Army), streamer embroidered VIETNAM 1969–1971
- Republic of Vietnam Cross of Gallantry with Palm, streamer embroidered VIETNAM 1970
- Republic of Vietnam Civil Action Honor Medal, First Class, streamer embroidered VIETNAM 1969-1970

== Shoulder Sleeve Insignia ==
Shoulder Sleeve Insignia, II Field Force, Vietnam

=== Description ===
On a shield arched at top 3 3/8 inches (8.6 cm) in height and 2 3/8 inches (6.0 cm) in width overall a crusader's unsheathed sword, point to top and with white blade and yellow hilt, superimposed on a blue stylized arrow throughout, shaft tapered and points and angled tips of arrowhead touching top and sides of shield, the areas on each side of the tapered shaft yellow and the areas on each side of the arrowhead red all within a 1/8 inch (0.32 cm) white border.

=== Symbolism ===
The shape of the shield and the unsheathed crusader's sword (the "Sword of Freedom") were suggested by the shoulder sleeve insignia previously authorized for the United States Military Assistance Command, Vietnam, and the United States Army, Vietnam. The stylized blue arrow and sword are used to represent the purpose and military might of the II Field Force pressing against, sweeping back, and breaking through enemy forces symbolized by the red areas. The dividing of the red and yellow areas of the shield into two parts allude to the numerical designation of the II Field Force, the colors red and yellow also being those of Vietnam. The colors red, white and blue are the national colors of the United States and further allude to the three major combat arms: Infantry, Artillery and Armor.

=== Background ===
The shoulder sleeve insignia was approved on 5 October 1966. (TIOH Dwg. No. A-1-437)

== Distinctive unit insignia ==
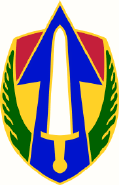
Distinctive Unit Insignia, II Field Force, Vietnam

=== Description/Blazon ===
A gold color metal and enamel insignia 1 1/4 inches (3.2 cm) in height overall consisting of a gold and scarlet device in the shape and background design of the authorized shoulder sleeve insignia of the II Field Force, Vietnam, between two conjoining green fronds of palm all surmounted by a vertical stylized blue arrow with a shallow pointed tapered shaft, the tip of the arrow and the shaft extending beyond the background design and over the palm frond, the side tips of the arrow touching the sides and the two areas above the side tips of scarlet, bearing an unsheathed Crusader sword with point up, the hilt gold and the blade white.

=== Symbolism ===
The operations and numerical designation are indicated by the scarlet and gold (yellow) device in the shape and background design of the authorized shoulder sleeve insignia of the II Field Force, Vietnam, and by the unsheathed Crusader sword which has become associated with Vietnam and the blue stylized arrow both of which were also suggested by the shoulder sleeve insignia and when taken together allude to the numeral II (or Second). The scarlet and gold (yellow) background and green palm fronds refer to the major combat operational area of the II Field Force which includes the defense of Saigon. The palm fronds are also symbolic of successful achievement.

=== Background ===
The distinctive unit insignia was approved on 27 November 1968.

== Combat Service Identification Badge ==
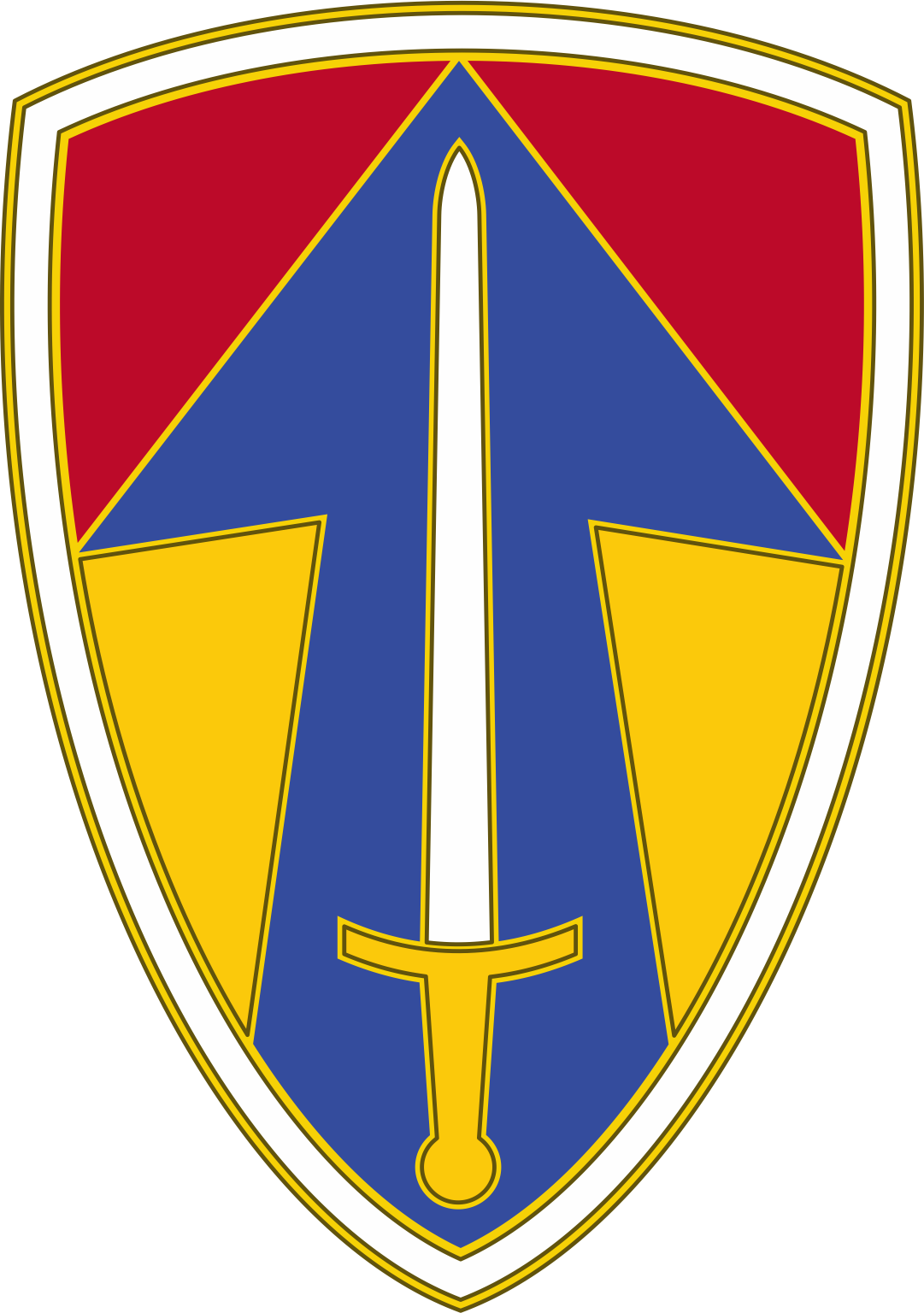
Distinctive Unit Insignia, II Field Force, Vietnam

A gold color metal and enamel device 2 inches (5.1 cm) in height consisting of a design similar to the shoulder sleeve insignia.
