= 199th Infantry Brigade (United States) =

- Shoulder sleeve insignia of the 199th Brigade.
- Active: 24 June 1921–11 January 1946 (various designations); 15 October 1946–22 April 1953 (various designations); 9 January 1955–17 April 1959 (100th Recon. Co., 100th Inf. Div.); 23 March 1966–15 October 1970 (199th Infantry Bge.); 16 February 1991–16 July 1992; 9 November 2006–present
- Country: United States
- Branch: United States Army
- Type: Infantry
- Role: Training
- Size: Brigade
- Part of: United States Army Infantry School
- Garrison/HQ: Fort Benning, Georgia
- Nickname: The Redcatchers
- Mottos: Light, Swift, Accurate
- Engagements: World War II; Rhineland; Ardennes-Alsace; Central Europe; Vietnam; Counteroffensive, Phase II; Counteroffensive, Phase Ill; Tet Counteroffensive; Counteroffensive, Phase lV; Counteroffensive, Phase V; Counteroffensive, Phase VI; Tet 69/Counteroffensive; Summer- Fall 1969; Winter- Spring 1970; Sanctuary Counteroffensive; Counteroffensive, Phase VII
- Decorations: Valorous Unit Award; Meritorious Unit Commendation; Republic of Vietnam Cross of Gallantry with Palm
- Website: Official website

Commanders
- Current commander: COL Neil J. Myres
- Command Sergeant Major: CSM Fred N. Tolman
- Notable commanders: Frederic E. Davison

Insignia
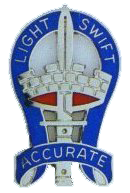
- Distinctive unit insignia

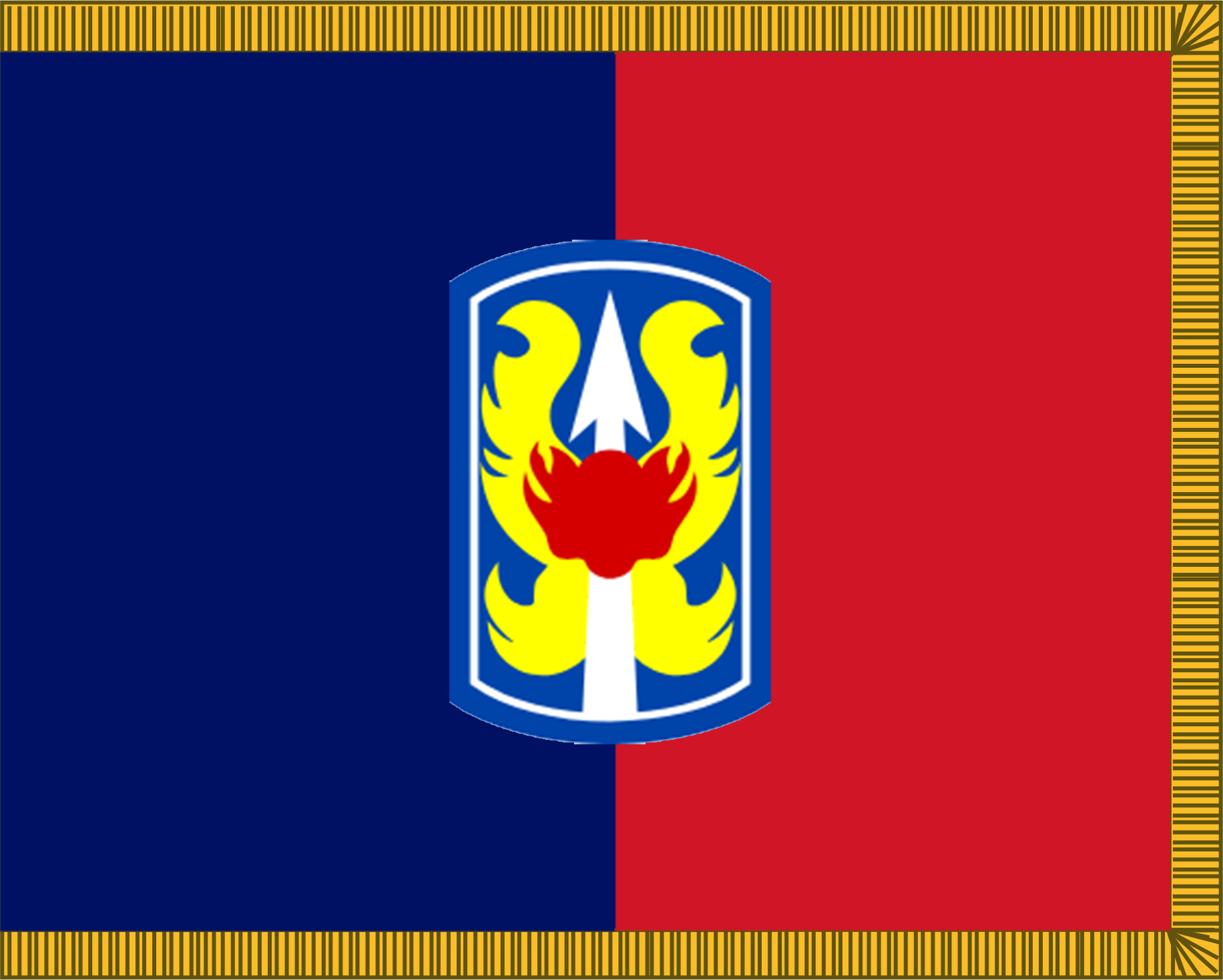
- 199th Infantry Brigade Flag

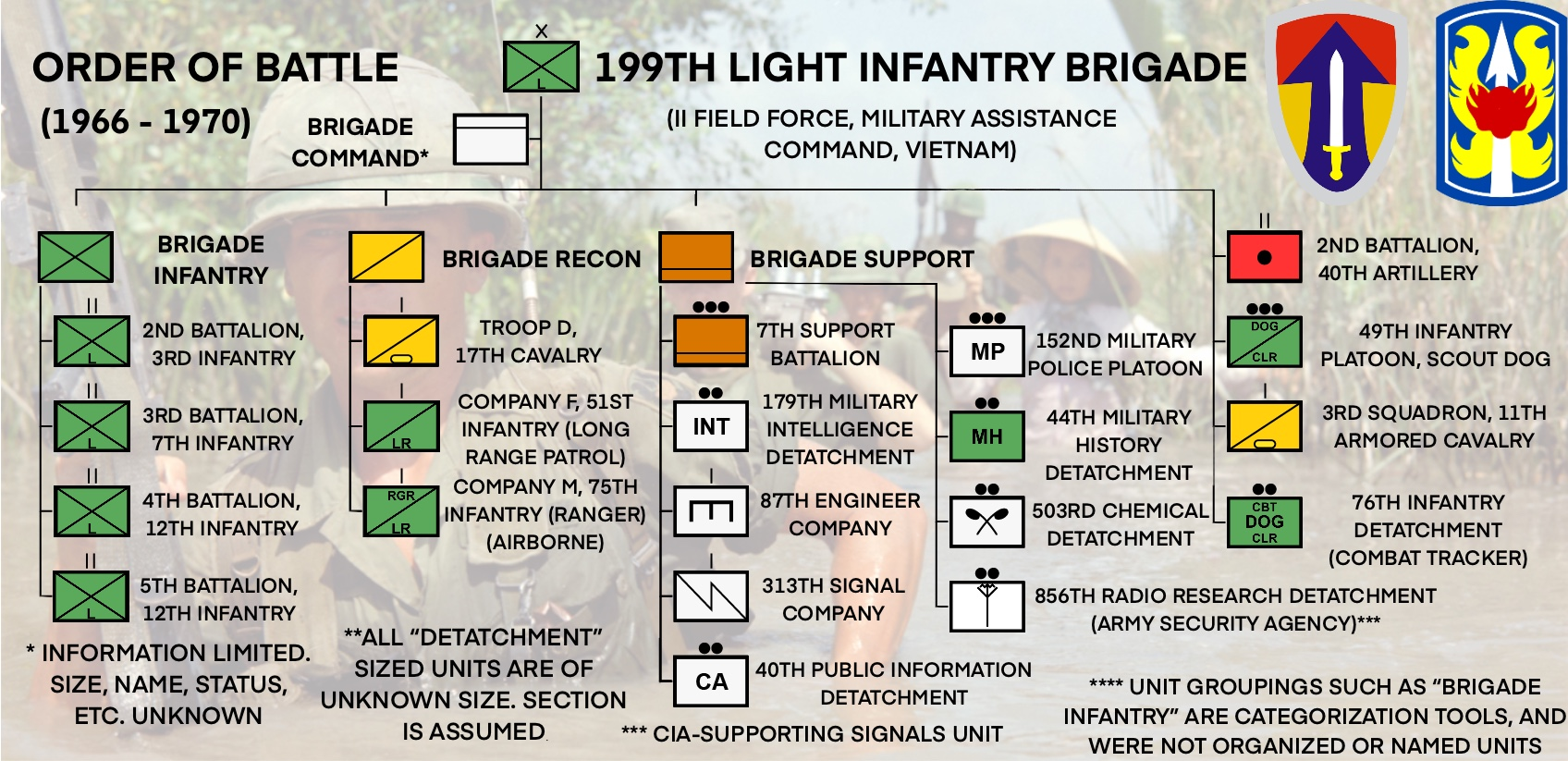
Order of Battle for the 199th Light Infantry Brigade during its time in Vietnam.

The 199th Infantry Brigade (Light) is a unit of the United States Army which served in the Army Reserve from 1921 to 1940, in the active army from 1966 to 1970 (serving in the Vietnam War), briefly in 1991–1992 at Fort Lewis, and from 2007 as an active army training formation at Fort Benning.

== Early history ==
Constituted 24 June 1921 in the Organized Reserves as Headquarters and Headquarters Company, 199th Infantry Brigade, an element of the 100th Division. Organized in December 1921 at Huntington, West Virginia. Redesignated 23 March 1925 as Headquarters and Headquarters Company, 199th Brigade. Location changed 27 October 1931 to Parkersburg, West Virginia. Redesigned 24 August 1936 as Headquarters and Headquarters Company, 199th Infantry Brigade.

Converted and Redesignated 23 February 1942 as 100th Reconnaissance Troop (less 3rd Platoon), 100th Division (Headquarters and Headquarters Company, 200th Infantry Brigade, concurrently converted and redesignated as the 3rd Platoon, 100th Reconnaissance Troop, 100th Division). Troop ordered into active military service 15 November 1942 and reorganized at Fort Jackson, South Carolina as the 100th Cavalry Reconnaissance Troop, an element of the 100th Infantry Division. Reorganized and Redesignated 2 August 1943 as the 100th Reconnaissance Troop, Mechanized. Reorganized and Redesignated 7 September 1945 as the 100th Mechanized Reconnaissance Troop. Inactivated 11 January 1946 at Camp Patrick Henry, Virginia. Redesignated 15 October 1946 as Reconnaissance Platoon, 100th Airborne Division. Activated 2 December 1946 at Louisville, Kentucky. (Organized Reserves Redesignated 25 March 1948 as the Organized Reserve Corps; Redesignated 9 July 1952 as the Army Reserve). Reorganized and Redesignated 31 August 1950 Anti-tank Platoon, 100th Airborne Division. Reorganized and Redesignated 12 May 1952 as the 100th Reconnaissance Company, an element of the 100th Infantry Division. Inactivated 22 April 1953 at Louisville, Kentucky. Activated 9 April 1955 at Neon, Kentucky. Disbanded 17 April 1959 at Neon, Kentucky.

== Vietnam War ==
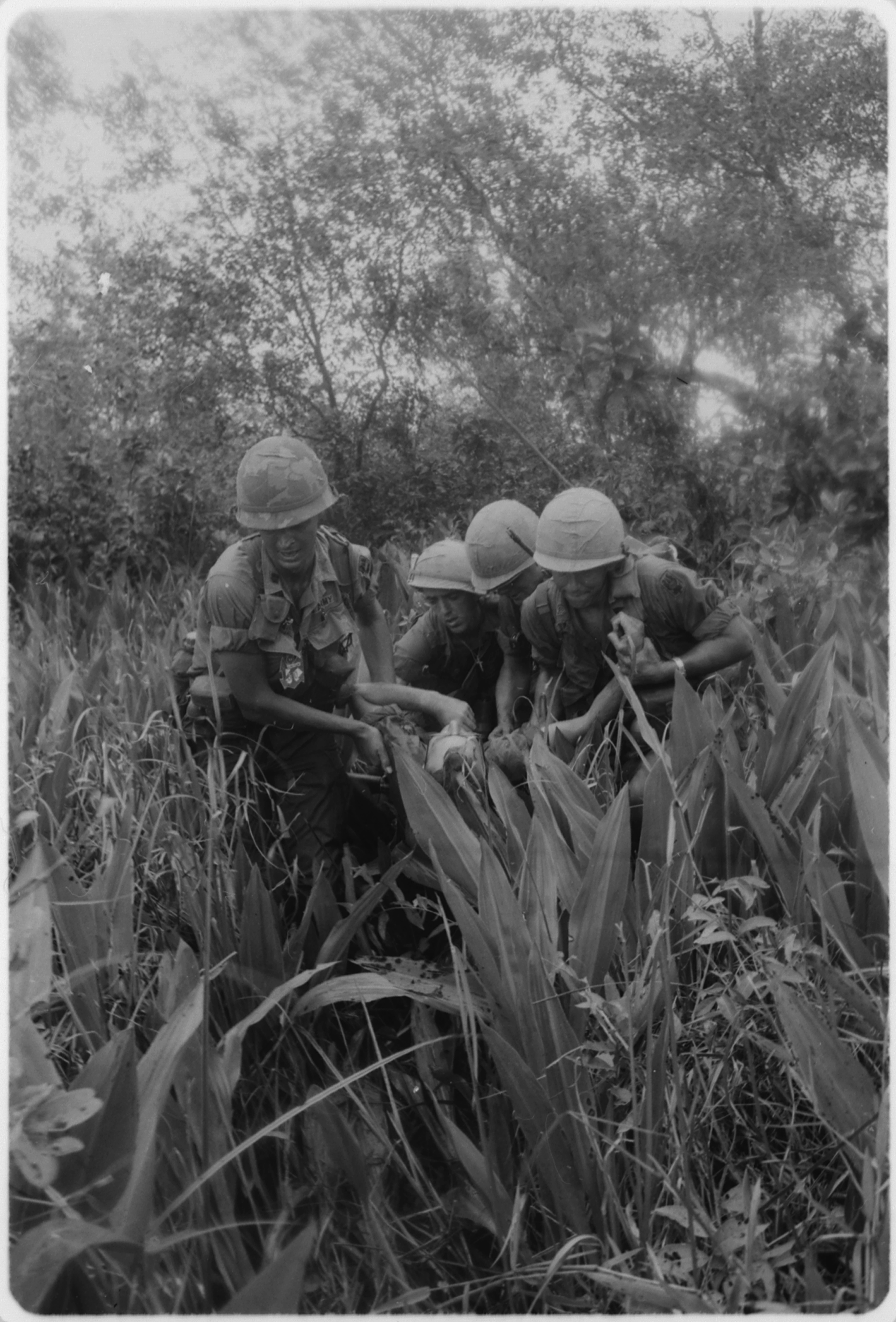
Soldiers from the 199th infantry Brigade carry a wounded member of their company from the field during a fire fight in Lhu Duc District during October 1967

Reconstituted (less 3rd Platoon) 23 March 1966 in the Regular Army as Headquarters and Headquarters Company, 199th Infantry Brigade (3rd Platoon, 100th Reconnaissance Company- hereafter separate lineage.) Activated 1 June 1966 at Fort Benning, Georgia.

It trained at Fort Benning and Camp Shelby, Mississippi from September to November 1966 in preparation for deployment to South Vietnam from Fort Benning. The 199th was the only combat unit to train at Camp Shelby during the Vietnam War.

Nicknamed "the Redcatchers", the unit was hastily moved to Sông Bé, Vietnam on 10 December 1966 to provide an increased U.S. presence in the III Corps Tactical Zone and remained there until its return to Fort Benning on 11 October 1970.

The brigade was conducting Operation Uniontown in Đồng Nai Province when the 1968 Tet Offensive began. It immediately began a defense of U.S. II Field Force headquarters at Long Binh Post against attacks by the VC 275th Regiment. One battalion was moved by helicopter to attack a Vietcong command post at the Phu Tho racetrack inside Saigon, then engaged in house-to-house fighting in Cholon.

During 1969, the 199th was responsible for the security of the region north and east of the capital, and in 1970 moved into the "Iron Triangle" when other units participated in the Cambodian Incursion.

- Units assigned to the 199th Infantry Brigade (Light):
  - Brigade infantry
    - 2nd Battalion, 3rd Infantry
    - 3rd Battalion, 7th Infantry
    - 4th Battalion, 12th Infantry
    - 5th Battalion, 12th Infantry
  - Brigade artillery
    - 2nd Battalion, 40th Artillery
  - Brigade reconnaissance
    - Troop D, 17th Cavalry (Armored)
    - Company F, 51st Infantry (Long Range Patrol)
    - Company M, 75th Infantry (Ranger)(Airborne)
  - Brigade support
    - 7th Support Battalion
    - 179th Military Intelligence Detachment
    - 87th Engineer Company
    - 313th Signal Company
    - 152nd Military Police Platoon
    - 44th military history detachment
    - 503rd Chemical Detachment
    - 856th Radio Research Detachment (Army Security Agency)
    - 40th Public Information Detachment
  - Other units on temporary duty
    - 49th Infantry Platoon (Scout Dog)
    - 76th Infantry Detachment (Combat Tracker)
    - 3rd Squadron, 11th Armored Cavalry Regiment
- Casualties
1. 754 killed in action
2. 4,679 wounded in action

The brigade was deactivated in 1970.

== Fort Lewis and Fort Benning ==
During the drawdown of the 9th Infantry Division at Fort Lewis in 1991–1992, a residual brigade, based around the division's 3rd Brigade, was briefly active as the 199th Infantry Brigade (Motorized) from 16 February 1991 before being reflagged on 16 July 1992 as the 2nd Armored Cavalry Regiment (light).

The structure of 199th Infantry Brigade at that time was:

- 199th Infantry Brigade (Motorized), Fort Lewis
  - Headquarters and Headquarters Company (HHC)
  - 1st Battalion, 29th Infantry
  - 1st Battalion, 33rd Armor
  - 2nd Battalion, 1st Infantry
  - 3rd Battalion, 47th Infantry
  - 1st Battalion, 11th Field Artillery
  - 99th Support Battalion (Forward)
  - Troop A, 9th Cavalry (previously Troop B, 1st Squadron, 9th Cavalry, then reflagged troop A 1/9 Cavalry 199th infantry and finally A troop 9th US cavalry)
  - 102nd Engineer Company (Company D, 15th Engineer Battalion)
  - 199th Military Intelligence Company
  - 9th Chemical Company
  - Battery E, 44th Air Defense Artillery

Then-Lieutenant Colonel Peter W. Chiarelli commanded the 2nd Battalion, 1st Infantry.

On 27 June 2007, the 11th Infantry Regiment was reflagged as the 199th Infantry Brigade at Fort Benning. In October 2013, the brigade was reorganized as part of restructuring within the Maneuver Center. The brigade was designated as the Leader Development Brigade and reorganized to contain both Armor and Infantry BOLC, OCS, and the MCCC.

- Units assigned to the 199th Infantry Brigade:
  - Headquarters and Headquarters Company (HHC), 199th Brigade (Maneuver Captains Career Course Detachment)
  - 2nd Squadron, 16th Cavalry Regiment Armor Basic Officer Leadership Course (ABOLC)
  - 1st Battalion, 29th Infantry Regiment (Abrams, Bradley, Stryker, Sniper, Combatives, etc. instruction)
  - 2nd Battalion, 11th Infantry Regiment Infantry Basic Officer Leader Course (IBOLC)
  - 3rd Battalion, 11th Infantry Regiment (Officer Candidate School)
  - 3rd Battalion, 81st Armored Regiment (administrative command, control, and support)
  - Army Noncommisioned Officer Academy
  - Command and Tactics Directorate (Infantry, Armor, and Combined Arms instruction)

== In popular culture ==
Michael Lee Lanning, a retired lieutenant colonel, served a tour in Vietnam with the Redcatchers as a lieutenant. He reported to Vietnam where as a second lieutenant he served as an infantry platoon leader and reconnaissance platoon leader. After his promotion to first lieutenant, he commanded a rifle company, Bravo Company of the 2d Battalion, 3d Infantry. He wrote two books about his experiences there: The Only War We Had: A Platoon Leader's Journal of Vietnam (New York: Ivy Books/Random House, 1987); and Vietnam 1969-1970: A Company Commander's Journal (New York: Ivy Books/Random House, 1988).
