= Tet Offensive attack on Tan Son Nhut Air Base =

Part of the Vietnam War (1968)

- Part of The Tet Offensive of the Vietnam War
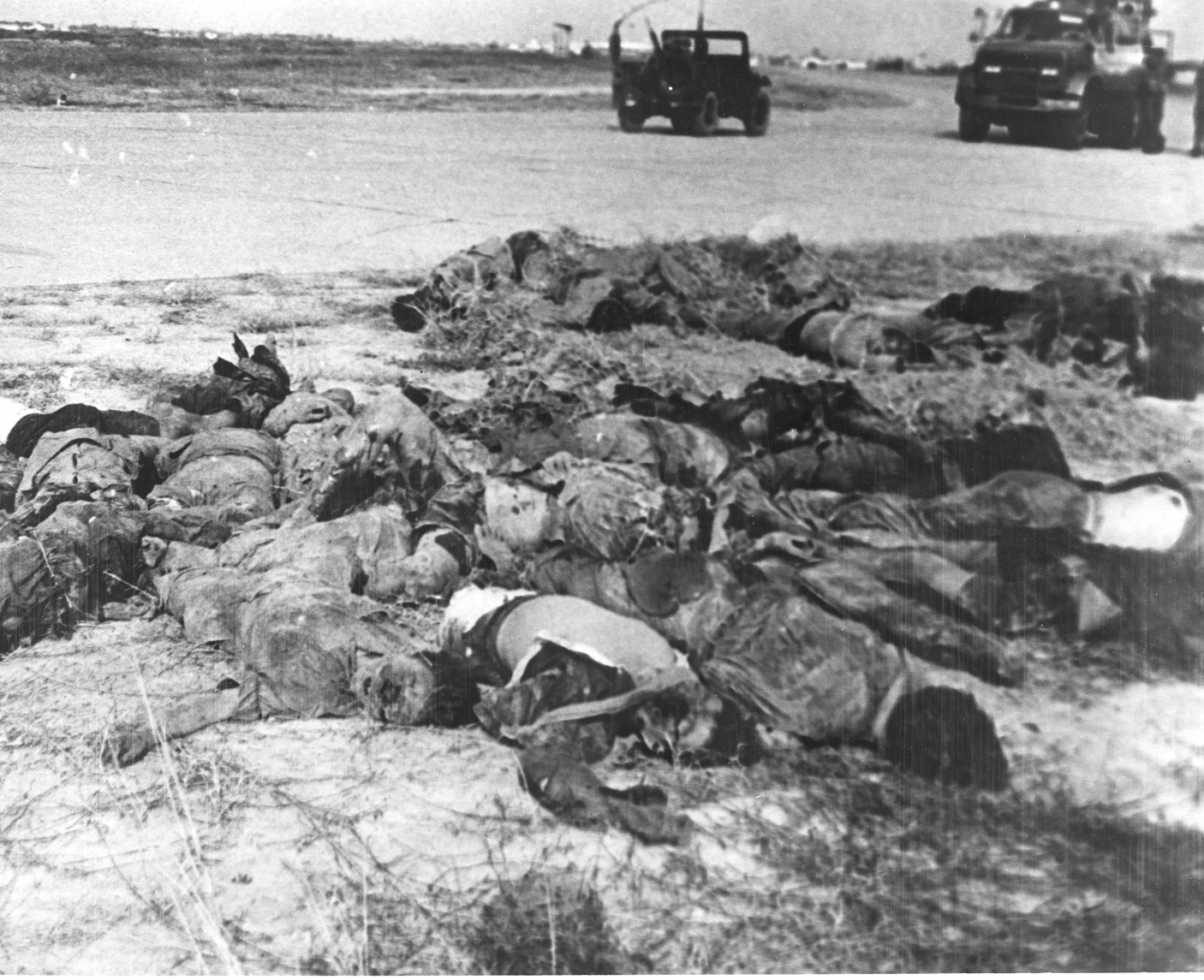
- VC/PAVN dead at Tan Son Nhut
Date	31 January 1968
Location	Tan Son Nhut Air Base, South Vietnam
Result	U.S./South Vietnamese victory

Belligerents
United States; South Vietnam	Viet Cong; North Vietnam

Commanders and leaders
(United States) Carl Bender (United States) Glenn K. Otis (South Vietnam) LTC Lưu Kim Cương	COL Nguyễn Thế Truyện

Units involved
(United States) 377th Security Police Squadron (United States) 3rd Squadron, 4th Cavalry Regiment (United States) Task Force 35 (ad hoc Army units) (South Vietnam) 2nd Service Battalion (South Vietnam) 8th Airborne Battalion	271st Regiment, 9th Division; 2nd Independent Battalion; D-16 Battalion; 267th MF Battalion; 269th MF Battalion

Casualties and losses
(United States) 22 killed (South Vietnam) 29 killed	U.S./ARVN body count: 669+ killed 26 captured

The attack on Tan Son Nhut Air Base, headquarters of the Republic of Vietnam Air Force (VNAF) and the United States Air Force (USAF) 7th Air Force, occurred during the early hours of 31 January 1968. Tan Son Nhut Air Base was one of the major air bases used for offensive air operations within South Vietnam and for the support of United States Army and Army of the Republic of Vietnam (ARVN) ground operations. The attack by Vietcong (VC) and People's Army of Vietnam (PAVN) forces was one of several major attacks on Saigon in the first days of the Tet Offensive. The attack was repulsed with the VC/PAVN suffering heavy losses; only superficial damage was done to the base.

== Background ==
The United States had been providing material support to South Vietnam since its foundation in 1954. The Vietnam War effectively began with the start of the North Vietnamese backed VC insurgency in 1959/60 and the U.S. increased its military aid and advisory support to South Vietnam in response. With the worsening military and political situation in South Vietnam, the U.S. increasingly became directly involved in the conflict. U.S. ground troops were first deployed to South Vietnam in March 1965 and by the end of that year almost 200,000 U.S. military personnel were deployed and were engaging in combat with the PAVN/VC. The growing U.S. presence was matched by North Vietnam and the U.S. and its allies increasingly took over fighting the PAVN/VC main force units from the Army of the Republic of Vietnam (ARVN), relegating them to pacification; fighting the war in the villages with the VC. The U.S. strategy was one of attrition warfare and they conducted hundreds of search and destroy operations to engage the PAVN/VC, but the PAVN/VC were usually able to control the location and timing of engagements to offset U.S. tactical advantages. A number of large, but essentially inconclusive, battles took place throughout 1966 and 1967. By late 1967 Military Assistance Command, Vietnam (MACV) claimed that every statistical indicator of progress showed that its strategy was succeeding.

With the buildup of U.S. ground forces in South Vietnam came massive infrastructure projects to support the logistical requirements of the war. Tan Son Nhut was eclipsed as the country's major air base by other large jet capable airfields, but it remained the primary international civilian airport and the Tan Son Nhut complex hosted a range of important military sites. On the west was the Tan Son Nhut Air Base the headquarters of the VNAF and the USAF 7th Air Force, then there was the civilian air terminal and Air America terminal, to the east was the MACV headquarters and then the South Vietnamese Joint General Staff (JGS) compound.

== Defenses and plans ==
Despite the 4 December 1966 VC sapper attack on Tan Son Nhut Air Base, base security was little improved by 1968. The attitude within MACV was that any large-scale VC attack would be detected and defeated before the force reached the base and so the only threat came from small-scale guerilla attacks of fewer than 200 men. The most vulnerable areas of the base were the sparsely populated western and northern perimeters where VC forces could assemble unnoticed and these were protected by old, largely ineffective, Japanese and French minefields, then three layers of concertina wire and a perimeter fence. Within the base, the 1,000 man USAF 377th Security Police Squadron (377th SPS) was responsible for base defense. They divided the base into six sectors and manned more than 50 observation towers and bunkers around the 20 km long inner perimeter of the base. Each sector had two machine gun armed jeeps and there were 14 13-man quick reactions teams ready to reach any point on the perimeter within 12 minutes. In an emergency the 377th SPS would also take operational control of Task Force 35 (TF 35), an ad hoc three-platoon collection of men from U.S. Army support units on the base. In addition the VNAF 2nd Service Battalion also shared responsibility for the defense of the base.

With its dual use as a civilian/military airfield and large numbers of Vietnamese workers on the base, it was easy for the VC to gain intelligence as to the base defenses. An old cemetery on the western perimeter was accessible to Vietnamese and an increase in visits and burials there was noted in the leadup to the attack. The 377th SPS regarded the western perimeter, designated Echo Sector, as the most vulnerable sector of the base as it was closest to the Delta Sector flightline, whereas any attack from the north would have to cross 4 km of open ground, including both runways, before reaching the flightline.

Central Office for South Vietnam gave responsibility for the attack to the 9th Division commander – Col. Nguyễn Thế Truyện (alias Năm Truyện) with a 2,665-man force: the 271st Main Force (MF) Regiment from his division, plus four attached battalions, the 2nd Independent Battalion, the D-16 Battalion, the 267th and 269th MF Battalions. The cadres in these units were southerners, but due to casualties, about half of the soldiers were fillers from the North. Truyện's plan called for the D-16 Battalion to occupy the Vinatexco textile mill (10.8158°N 106.630°E) on Highway 1 (now Route 22/Trường Chinh), which ran along the west perimeter of the base, approximately 1 km north of the 051 Gate (10.811°N 106.633°E), the planned entry point. The Vinatexco Mill would form the headquarters for the attack. The 269th MF Battalion would lead the attack on the 051 Gate, followed by the 267th MF Battalion which would exploit the opening and then the 1st Battalion, 271st Regiment would attack the flightline and base facilities.

The Tết ceasefire began on 29 January, but was cancelled on 30 January after the VC/PAVN prematurely launched attacks on II Corps and at 17:30 the 7th Air Force commander General William W. Momyer ordered all air bases in South Vietnam to security condition red. On the night of 30/31 January, Truyện's forces marched into their attack positions, undetected by the ARVN 53rd Regional Force Battalion responsible for security outside the perimeter north and west of the base.

== Battle ==
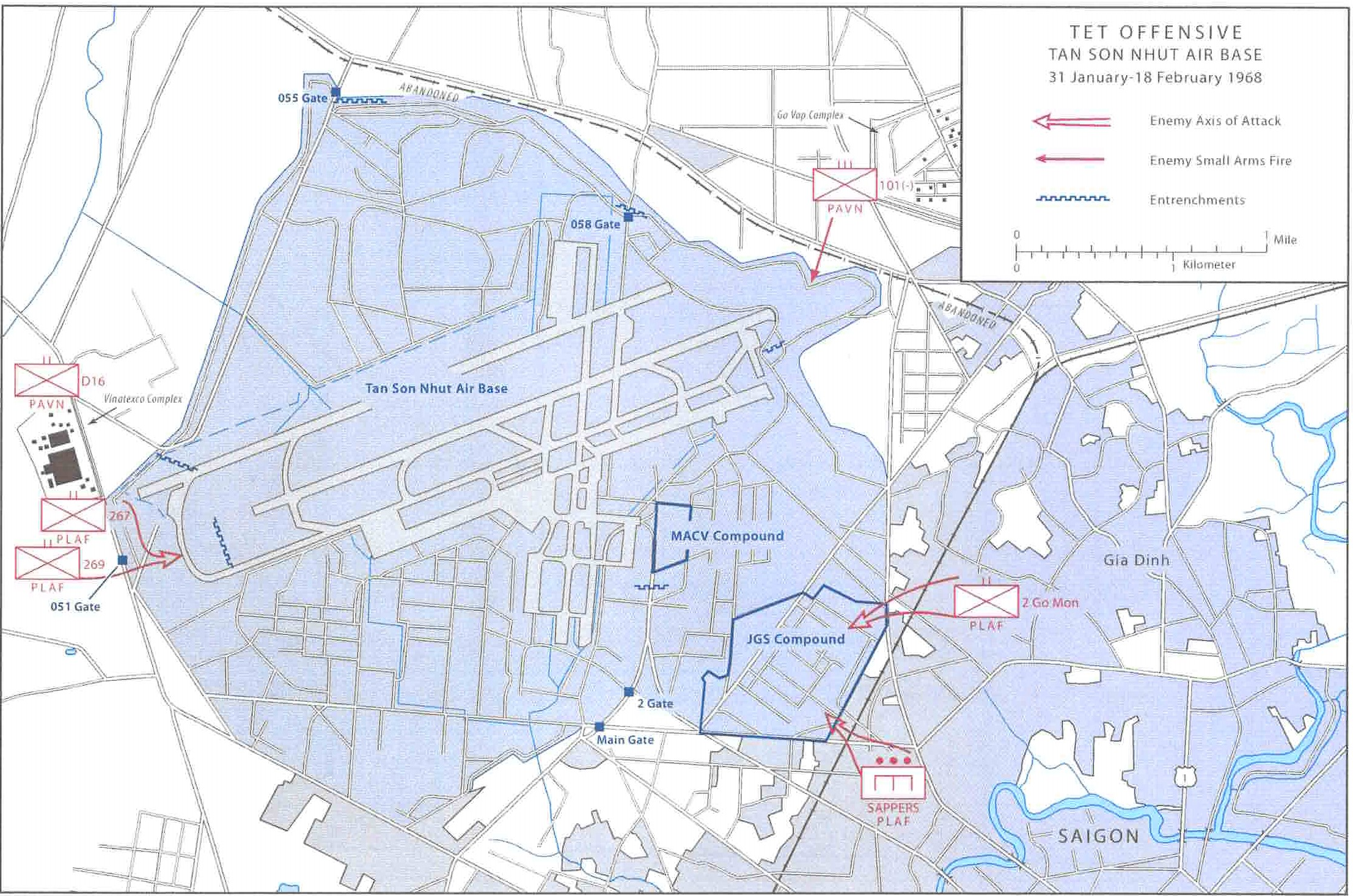
Tet offensive attack on Tan Son Nhut and JGS, 31 January 1968

=== Attack ===
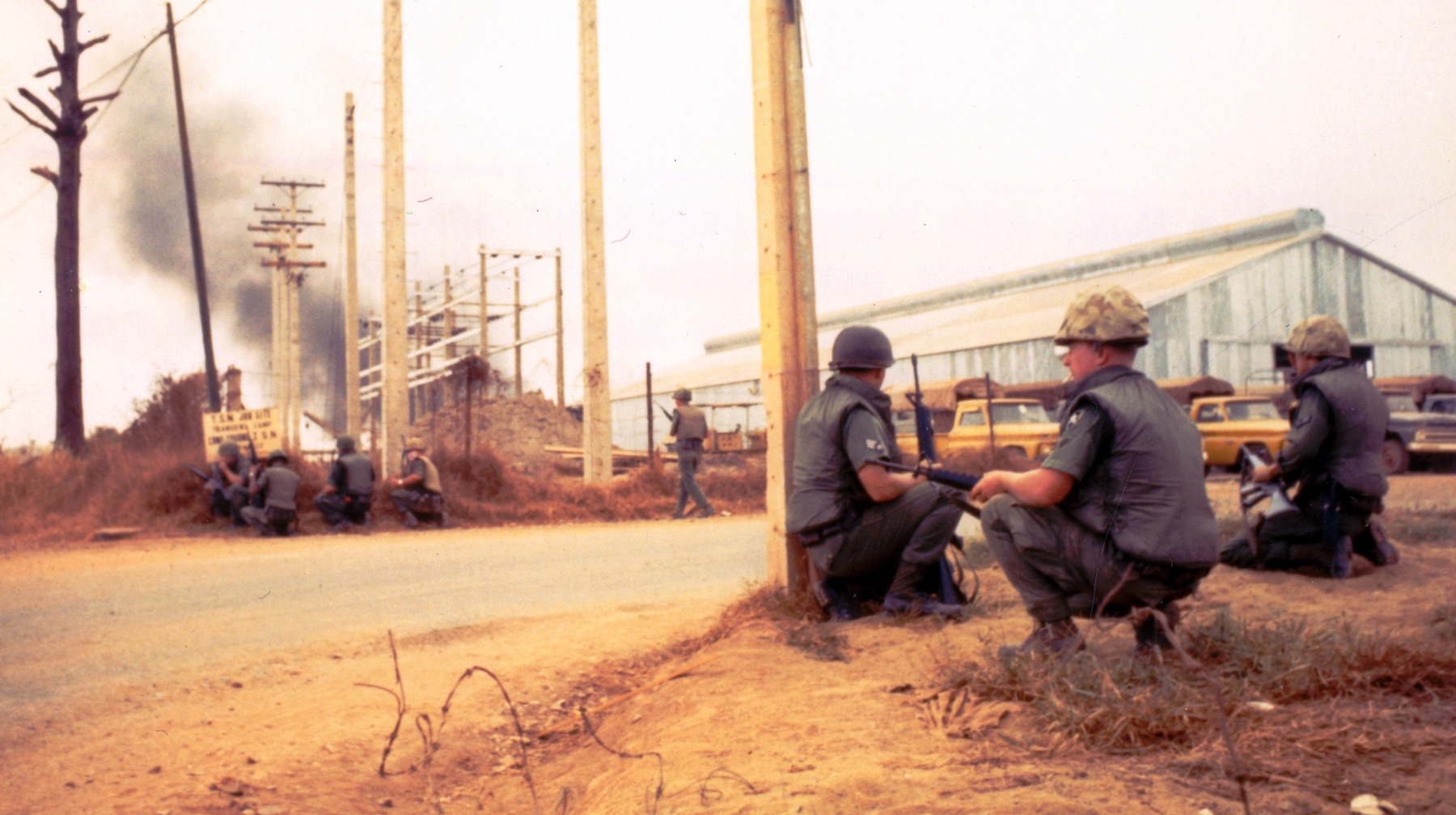
377th SPS troops at Tan Son Nhut during the attack

At approximately 03:20 on 31 January, the VC launched a series of diversionary attacks by fire on the north-eastern perimeter of the base with tracer rounds aimed at the petroleum, oil and lubricants storage tanks northeast of the north runway. The VC also fired on Gate 1, the main gate of the base. At approximately 03:30, an observer in the Tango 4 tower 15m from the 051 Gate at the western end of the base reported mortar fire on the western perimeter fence with VC forces assembling in the village west of the fence. The "mortar rounds" were actually Bangalore torpedoes and satchel charges used to blow holes in the concertina wire and perimeter fence and the VC were soon entering the base.

At the 051 Bunker (10.8075°N 106.6355°E) 200m south of the 051 Gate, the five-man team poured flanking fire onto the VC/PAVN with their M60 machine gun on the sandbagged rooftop and with their rifles, but the VC soon responded with a barrage of RPG-2 and mortar fire, forcing the Security Policemen inside the bunker and to call for help. A gun jeep was sent to assess the situation in Echo Sector, but was stopped by heavy fire near the northeast corner of the base and reported large numbers of VC coming through the 051 Gate. By 03:45, the VC had overrun the 051 Bunker, killing four of the five men inside and severely wounding the survivor. A patrol from the ARVN 53rd Regional Forces reported that a further one or two battalions were waiting near the Vinatexco Mill to join the assault.

Several Echo Sector quick reaction teams were sent to the 051 Gate and the 051 Bunker while four UH-1C Huey gunships of the U.S. Army's 4th Platoon, 120th Assault Helicopter Company, 1st Aviation Brigade arrived over Echo Sector and began dropping flares and engaging the VC with rocket and machine-gun fire. At the Central Security Control (CSC) there was limited information as to the size of the VC attack, but the situation at the 051 Gate was seen as critical and 377th SPS Operations Officer Major Carl Bender ordered a platoon from TF 35 (composed mostly of men from the 1st Signal Brigade) to reinforce the quick reaction teams that had formed a skirmish line 250m east of the gate on the east side of the Whiskey 8 north-south taxiway. Not being trained infantry, the TF 35 troops were inexperienced and nervous, with a two-man machine gun team being killed when they advanced towards the VC and others almost firing on friendly troops. A second platoon from TF 35 soon arrived to join the skirmish line. Further south, VC forces had reached the flightline and placed satchel charges under VNAF C-47s, damaging 14 of them before being forced back by the Delta Sector quick reaction team.

The VC were unable to cross the exposed Whiskey 8 taxiway and the U.S. forces there were now being constantly reinforced and resupplied. A composite group of VNAF and ARVN forces joined on the south of the line together with three M41 light tanks and the U.S. and South Vietnamese forces then formed a horseshoe defence, pouring fire on the VC from multiple directions. Two of the M41s were knocked out by RPGs, and the commander of the VNAF 33rd Tactical Wing – Lt. Col. Lưu Kim Cương was shot in the leg but remained in command of his forces. A ten-man VC squad tried to outflank the line but was stalked by Bender, who progressively shot the last VC in line, killing eight and breaking up the flanking manoeuvre. Meanwhile, the ARVN 8th Airborne Battalion that was at the base waiting for transport north to Khe Sanh Combat Base were committed to the battle, arriving in Echo Sector to begin a counterattack following a preparatory artillery bombardment.

=== Counter-attack ===
At dawn, the VC began to withdraw through holes in the perimeter fence near the 051 Bunker. The ARVN Airborne began their advance towards the perimeter in a skirmish line, but as they did so they were fired on from behind by VC who were lying in the long grass or sheltering in the cemetery, killing or wounding 18 ARVN soldiers. The Airborne then regrouped and began engaging the VC.

When the base perimeter had originally been breached, Lieutenant Colonel Jack Garred, the senior advisor to the South Vietnamese Tan Son Nhut Security Forces, requested a U.S. Army Brigade to secure the western flank of the base. II Field Force, Vietnam ordered the 25th Infantry Division at Củ Chi Base Camp, 24 km north of Tan Son Nhut, to send an armored cavalry troop to Hóc Môn District to cut off the anticipated VC route of withdrawal from Tan Son Nhut. At 04:15, the mission was assigned to Lieutenant Colonel Glenn K. Otis's 3rd Squadron, 4th Cavalry Regiment. Otis assigned the mission to his only available forces at Củ Chi, two platoons of Troop C commanded by Captain Leo Virant with a strength of three M48 tanks and ten M113 Armored Cavalry Assault Vehicles (ACAVs). As Troop C left their base at 05:03, the mission was changed from securing Hóc Môn to counterattacking the VC at Tan Son Nhut. Virant left the base by a side entrance to avoid Củ Chi village, which was under attack by the VC, and followed secondary roads rather than Highway 1 to avoid mines and ambushes, while Otis flew overhead in a UH-1 which dropped flares along the route. At dawn Otis's UH-1 returned to Củ Chi to refuel and after crossing the Hóc Môn Bridge the unit came under the control of the Capital Military District and Virant contacted Garred at the base who sent an ARVN officer to meet Troop C and guide them to the battle area. However, the ARVN officer was unable to provide any useful tactical information. Garred ordered Virant to move down the west perimeter of the base and fire on anything west of the base, but was unable to provide any information on VC strength or dispositions. Placing an M48 at the head of the column, Virant followed directly behind in his command ACAV.

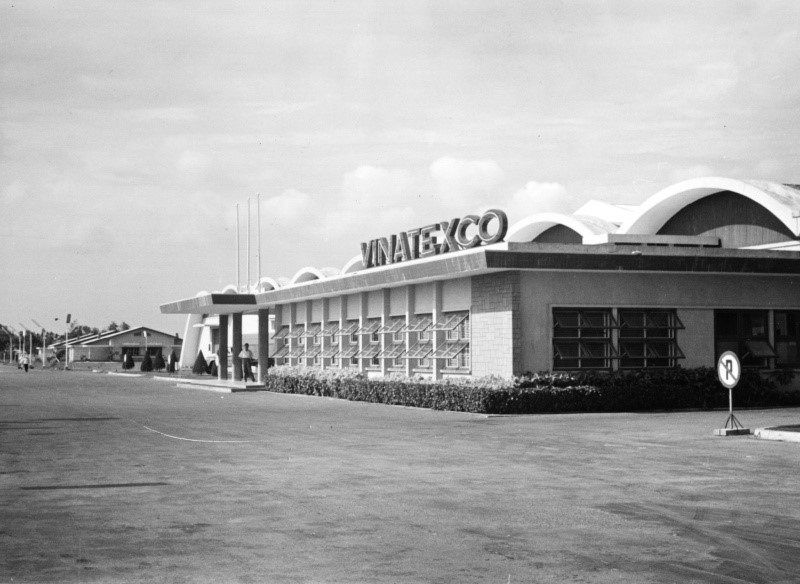
Vinatexco textile mill

As Troop C passed the Vinatexco Mill they received light fire from the VC/PAVN in the Mill and continued south. At 07:08, the lead M48 was just abreast of the 051 Gate when it was hit by several RPG-2s from the village to the west of the Highway. The four-man crew were all killed by RPGs or automatic weapons fire, and the driver of Virant's command ACAV was also shot in the head and killed. Virant radioed to his unit to form a right herringbone formation, allowing all guns to fire on the VC to the west. All of Virant's crew were soon killed or wounded and he himself was knocked unconscious by a metal fragment to the head. The next two ACAVs were hit by RPGs before they could turn to engage the VC, while the fifth ACAV was protected by a roadside advertising sign. The remaining tanks and ACAVs were stretched out along the highway and began firing on the numerous VC in the village and areas west of the highway and were met by a constant volley of RPGs and machine gun and AK-47 fire. The tanks fired canister shot while the other crewmen fired off their M60s and 0.50 Calibres until they burnt out the barrels and exhausted their ammunition. The surviving crewmen of vehicles that had been hit continued to fire from a drainage ditch between the highway and the base perimeter fence. The arrival of Troop C cut off the VC inside the base from withdrawal or reinforcement.

When he landed back at Củ Chi, Otis was informed that Troop C had radioed that it was under attack and calling for assistance. The squadron operations officer had already ordered the remaining 1st Platoon of Troop C at Hóc Môn Bridge to proceed to Tan Son Nhut. Otis ordered Troop A at Gò Dầu Hạ and Troop B at Trảng Bàng District to also move to assist Troop C. Otis then took off for Tan Son Nhut in another UH-1 together with gunships from his Troop D air cavalry unit. Otis arrived over the column and his helicopter began taking fire from VC DShK heavy machine guns. His helicopter landed at the western end of the base and Otis made contact with Staff Sergeant Gary Brewer, who had taken command of Troop C and asked for more machine gun ammunition. Otis ordered his UH-1 lift helicopters to load up with ammunition, while Brewer ordered the last M48 in the column to flatten the concertina wire and perimeter fence to create an access route into the base for resupply and medical evacuation. When the lift helicopters landed Brewer and others carried ammunition along the column and drainage ditch and brought back the wounded.

Otis ordered his gunships to make north–south firing runs on the village, with two being severely damaged by anti-aircraft fire and having to make emergency landings in the base. When the 1st Platoon of Troop C approached the area at 07:30, Otis ordered them to deploy east along a side road and into a gate where they would support the Security Police and ARVN fighting inside the base. The VC/PAVN inside the 051 Bunker were continuing to fire on the Security Police and ARVN; with the arrival of the 1st Platoon it was decided to neutralise it. An M48 fired its 90mm main gun on the bunker until it was disabled by RPG fire; the crew evacuated except for Specialist 4 Robert Crowell who remained in the tank and fired a further 18 rounds until he was killed.

Troop B arrived at the scene at 08:00, having driven the 39 km from Trảng Bàng in one hour, avoiding or driving through several VC roadblocks. At Củ Chi, they had joined up with Battery C, 6th Battalion, 77th Artillery equipped with towed 105 mm howitzers. Otis ordered them to head west from Highway 1 after passing the Vinatexco Mill and they deployed along a northeast–southwest axis against the VC-held village. The headquarters platoon was to engage the Vinatexco Mill while the other two platoons attacked south through the village, the artillery and helicopter gunships would prevent any escape to the south or southwest. The subsequent assault was described as a "turkey shoot" as any fleeing VC/PAVN had to run a gauntlet of fire. However, many VC stayed to fight, putting up a steady stream of RPG and AK-47 fire and were systematically killed in their fighting positions. Otis was shot down three times while overseeing the battle.

Late that morning, VNAF A-1 Skyraiders and USAF F-100 Super Sabres began airstrikes on the Vinatexco Mill dropping napalm and 500 lb bombs on the VC/PAVN headquarters.

At midday, the VC still holding out inside the 051 Bunker released the surviving wounded security policeman, but did not surrender themselves; they were soon killed or wounded by grenades thrown inside. At 12:19, the four surviving VC surrendered, ending the battle inside the west perimeter.

By 13:00, the 1st Battalion, 18th Infantry Regiment had been landed by CH-47s from Dĩ An Base Camp and leaving one company to defend the MACV Compound east of the base, they moved southeast from the air base to clear out VC/PAVN in the urban areas south of the base. They fought small groups of VC until dusk when the VC disengaged. The fighting in the village continued until 16:30 and at dusk the 3/4th Cavalry withdrew into the base perimeter. The U.S. forces shot all the VC/PAVN bodies to ensure they were dead, but the following morning two VC emerged from the bodies to surrender.

== Aftermath ==
U.S. losses in the attack were 22 killed (377th SPS 4; TF35 2; Troop B 3/4th Cavalry 3; Troop C 3/4th Cavalry 12; 1/18th Infantry 1) and 82 wounded. South Vietnamese losses were 29 killed and 15 wounded. VC/PAVN losses were more than 669 killed (157 inside the base, 162 inside the Vinatexco Mill and more than 350 in the village) and 26 captured. A group of 5 or 6 VC/PAVN prisoners were executed by members of Troop C, 3/4th Cavalry.

After the battle Otis, Brewer and Crowell (posthumously) were awarded the Distinguished Service Cross. Bender was awarded the Silver Star. In July 2022 former Specialist Five Dwight W. Birdwell of Troop C, 3rd Squadron, 4th Cavalry was awarded the Medal of Honor for his actions in the battle.

The attacks on Tan Son Nhut and at Bien Hoa Air Base slowly led to an improvement in air base defense across South Vietnam, with improved bunkers and heavier defensive armament including 0.50 cal machine guns, M67 recoilless rifles and M29 mortars and, at Tan Son Nhut, two truck-mounted M45 Quadmounts. The gun-jeeps were progressively replaced by M113s and XM-706 Commando armored cars. However, the VC/PAVN never made another ground attack on an air base and moved to attacks by fire with rockets, mortar and artillery.

The Tet Offensive attacks and previous losses due to mortar and rocket attacks on air bases across South Vietnam led the Deputy Secretary of Defense Paul Nitze on 6 March 1968 to approve the construction of 165 "Wonderarch" hardened aircraft shelters at the major air bases. In addition airborne "rocket watch" patrols were established in the Saigon-Bien Hoa area to reduce attacks by fire.
