= Glenn K. Otis =

United States Army general

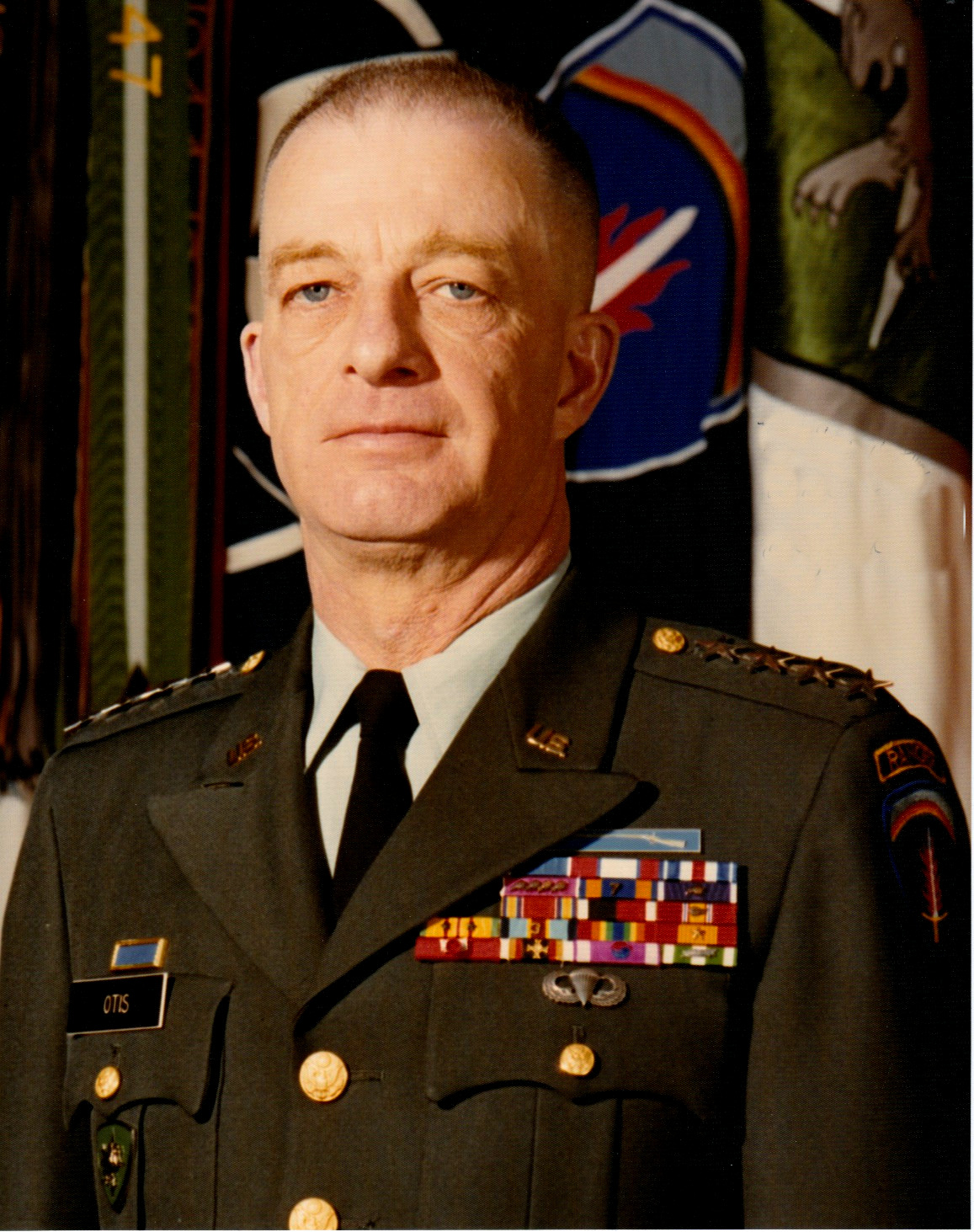
- Born: 15 March 1929; Plattsburgh, New York, U.S.
- Died: 21 February 2013 (aged 83); Carlisle, Pennsylvania, U.S.
- Military career
- Allegiance: United States
- Branch: United States Army
- Service years: 1946–1988
- Rank: General
- Commands: United States Army Europe; United States Army Training and Doctrine Command; 1st Armored Division
- Conflicts: Vietnam War
- Awards: Distinguished Service Cross; Army Distinguished Service Medal; Silver Star; Legion of Merit (5); Purple Heart (2)

General Glenn Kay Otis (15 March 1929 – 21 February 2013) was a United States Army four-star general who served as Commanding General, United States Army Training and Doctrine Command from 1981 to 1983, and as Commander in Chief, United States Army Europe/Commander, Central Army Group from 1983 to 1988. He was a native of Plattsburgh, New York.

== Military career ==
Otis enlisted in the United States Army in 1946 and served on occupation duty in post-World War II Korea. He was later picked from the ranks to attend the United States Military Academy, from which he graduated in 1953. He holds a master's degree in mathematics from Rensselaer Polytechnic Institute and, in 1965, was one of the first student officers to receive a Master of Military Art and Science degree from the Command and General Staff College.

During the Vietnam War, Otis distinguished himself in the Tet Offensive as commander of the 3d Squadron, 4th Cavalry, 25th Infantry Division. During the Tet Offensive attack on Tan Son Nhut Air Base, his unit was faced with an enemy battalion of 600 men; his squadron killed 300 and took 24 prisoners. Throughout his tour in Vietnam, Otis received the Distinguished Service Cross, Silver Star, and Purple Heart with Oak Leaf Cluster, the Legion of Merit, and eight Air Medals. The squadron he commanded received the Presidential Unit Citation.

As a brigadier general, Otis was assigned as director of the XM-1 Tank Task Force in 1974, two years after its commencement, overseeing engine change, provisions made to future upgrade of the main gun from 105mm to M256 120mm weapon, the turret was stabilized to permit firing on the move, advanced night vision technology was integrated, and suspension, armor and mobility were upgraded.

Key assignments during his career included Deputy Chief of Staff, Combined Arms Combat Development Agency, Fort Leavenworth, from 1976 to 1978, Commander, 1st Armored Division from 1978 to 1979, Deputy Chief of Staff, Operations and Plans, Department of the Army from 1979 to 1981, Commanding General, United States Army Training and Doctrine Command from 1981 to 1983, and Commander in Chief, United States Army Europe from 1983 to 1988.

== Later life ==
In retirement, Otis remained active as a senior fellow of the Institute of Land Warfare, the Association of the United States Army, and as a member of the Army Science Board. He also served as a member of the House Armed Services Committee's Commission to Assess United States National Security Space Management and Organization in 2000, which was chaired by Donald Rumsfeld.

Otis died at a hospital at Carlisle, Pennsylvania in 2013 of complications of a heart attack and aneurysm. He was 83.

== Distinguished Service Cross citation ==
- Otis, Glenn K. Lieutenant Colonel (Armor), U.S. Army
- Headquarters Troop, 3d Squadron, 4th Cavalry Regiment, 25th Infantry Division
- Date of Action: 31 January 1968
- General Orders No. 2546 (28 May 1968) Home Town: Vicksburg, Michigan

Citation:

The Distinguished Service Cross is presented to Glenn K. Otis, Lieutenant Colonel (Armor), U.S. Army, for extraordinary heroism in connection with military operations involving conflict with an armed hostile force in the Republic of Vietnam, while serving with Headquarters Troop, 3d Squadron, 4th Cavalry, 25th Infantry Division. Lieutenant [sic] Otis distinguished himself by exceptionally valorous actions on 31 January 1968 as commanding officer of a cavalry squadron defending against the communist Lunar New Year offensive at Tan Son Nhut Air Base. Viet Cong and North Vietnamese Army forces launched a massive attack on the base and penetrated the defensive wire. Colonel Otis responded to a call for assistance and immediately led his squadron to reinforce the beleaguered friendly elements. Braving devastating rocket, machine gun and mortar fire, he repeatedly ordered low passes over the enemy positions to assess the rapidly changing situation and skillfully coordinate his unit's defenses. His aircraft was forced down on three occasions by the intense enemy fusillade, but he refused to leave the battle area and quickly secured another helicopter each time. The battle grew in intensity, as he fearlessly landed amid a curtain of fire to coordinate with his ground commanders and encourage his men to continue their staunch defenses. His skillful and aggressive leadership inspired his men to repel the attack and force the determined insurgents to withdraw. Informed that an estimated Viet Cong battalion, poised outside the perimeter, was threatening the air base, he quickly directed his unit in a search and clear operation. Repeatedly exposing himself to savage enemy fire, he led his men in a fierce attack that totally destroyed the enemy forces. His fearless leadership in the heat of battle was instrumental in preventing the vital military installation from falling into enemy hands. Lieutenant Colonel Otis' extraordinary heroism and devotion to duty were in keeping with the highest traditions of the military service and reflect great credit upon himself, his unit, and the United States Army.

== Notes ==
Military offices
Preceded by Donn A. Starry	Commanding General, United States Army Training and Doctrine Command; 1981–1983	Succeeded by William R. Richardson
Preceded by Frederick Kroesen	Commanding General, United States Army Europe; 1983–1988	Succeeded by Crosbie E. Saint
