= Võ Văn Hoàng =

South Vietnamese brigadier general

- Born: Nguyễn Văn Điều
- Died: 1968
- Military career
- Allegiance: North Vietnam
- Branch: (Provisional Revolutionary Government of the Republic of South Vietnam) Liberation Army of South Vietnam
- Rank: Lt. Col. (or Major)
- Nickname: Hai Hoàng
- Commands: 261st Battalion (Giron); 31st Regiment (Sub-Region 2)
- Conflicts: Vietnam War: Battle of Ap Bac; Battle of West Saigon

Võ Văn Hoàng, alias Hai Hoàng, born Nguyễn Văn Điều, was a Liberation Army of South Vietnam (aka PLAF or VC) Regiment commander, who was killed in action in the May Offensive 1968. He commanded the VC 261st Battalion of Military Region VIII in the Battle of Ap Bac and the VC 2nd Regiment of the Sài Gòn - Gia Định Sub-Region 2 in the Battle of West Saigon.

== Military career ==
In the Battle of Ap Bac 1963, the VC Military Region VIII 261st Battalion commander Hai Hoàng led a joint force of his battalion's 1st company and the Mỹ Tho 514th Battalion's 1st Company, fighting against an Army of the Republic of Vietnam (ARVN) brigade-size task force consisted of the 11th Infantry Regiment, the 8th Airborne Battalion, two Civil Guard battalions, the 4th Mechanised Rifle Squadron.

In the Battle of West Saigon 1968, the Sài Gòn - Gia Định Sub-Region 2 Deputy commander Hai Hoàng led his 31st Regiment consisting of three battalions (267th, 269th, and 6th Bình Tân). On 17 June, Hai Hoàng and his 11 remaining soldiers were tightly encircled but steadfastly refused to surrender, then fought their last battle and were killed in action.
