= Dwight W. Birdwell =

Retired United States Army Medal of Honor recipient

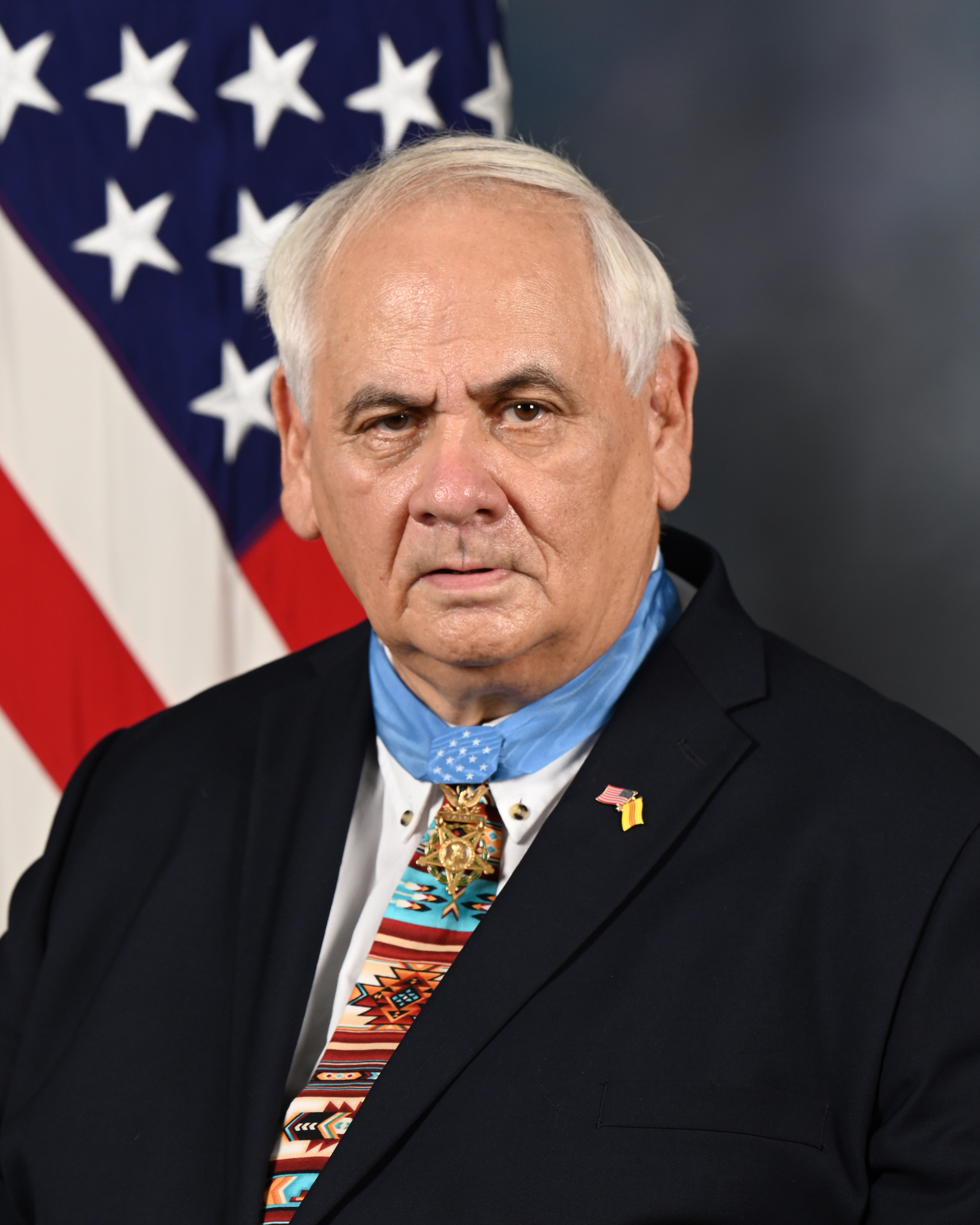
- Birdwell in 2022
- Born: 19 January 1948 (age 78); Amarillo, Texas, U.S.
- Military career
- Allegiance: United States of America
- Branch: United States Army
- Service years: 1966–1968
- Rank: Specialist 5
- Units: Troop C, 3rd Squadron, 4th Cavalry Regiment
- Conflicts: Vietnam War; Tet offensive attack on Tan Son Nhut Air Base (WIA)
- Awards: Medal of Honor; Purple Heart (2); Silver Star (2); Bronze Star

Dwight Wayne Birdwell (born 19 January 1948) is a former United States Army soldier who received the Medal of Honor in 2022 for his actions in the Vietnam War in 1968 during the Tet Offensive attack on Tan Son Nhut Air Base.

== Early life ==
Birdwell was born in Amarillo, Texas, on 19 January 1948. A citizen of the Cherokee Nation, he grew up in the small, predominantly Cherokee Indian community of Bell, Oklahoma. He attended Bell Grade School, and graduated from Stilwell High School in 1966.

== Military career ==
Birdwell entered the Army on 24 May 1966.

=== Vietnam War ===
Birdwell was assigned to Troop C, 3rd Squadron, 4th Cavalry, 25th Infantry Division. He received his first Silver Star for heroism on 31 January 1968, when his unit raced to defend Tan Son Nhut Air Base, which was under attack during the Tet Offensive. Troop C was the first American ground unit from outside the airbase to respond to the attack. When Birdwell's tank commander was seriously wounded, Birdwell took command and placed intense fire on the attacking People's Army of Vietnam (PAVN) forces until his ammunition was expended. He then retrieved an M60 machine gun and continued firing at the PAVN until the weapon was damaged by PAVN fire, which also wounded Birdwell. With disregard for his own safety, he ran through a hail of PAVN fire to get more ammunition for his men from other damaged vehicles.

On the night of 4 July 1968, he again risked his life to rescue more Americans, some of them wounded, who were stranded in a battle zone in an enemy-occupied village. Seeing a damaged Army personnel carrier, he exposed himself to heavy enemy fire while loading all of the wounded and evacuating them to safety. He then went back into the village to rescue more Americans, for which he was awarded his second Silver Star for bravery.

Birdwell returned to the United States in December 1968.

== Later life ==
Birdwell attended Northeastern State University and then the University of Oklahoma College of Law, graduating in 1976.

He was a member of the Judicial Appeals Tribunal (Supreme Court) of the Cherokee Nation from 1987 to 1999, serving as its chief justice from 1995 to 1996 and 1998 to 1999. He is now a practicing attorney in Oklahoma City. For a number of years he served on the Cherokee Nation Judicial Appeals Tribunal.

== Personal life ==
He and his wife of 53 years have two children and two grandchildren.

== Medal of Honor ==
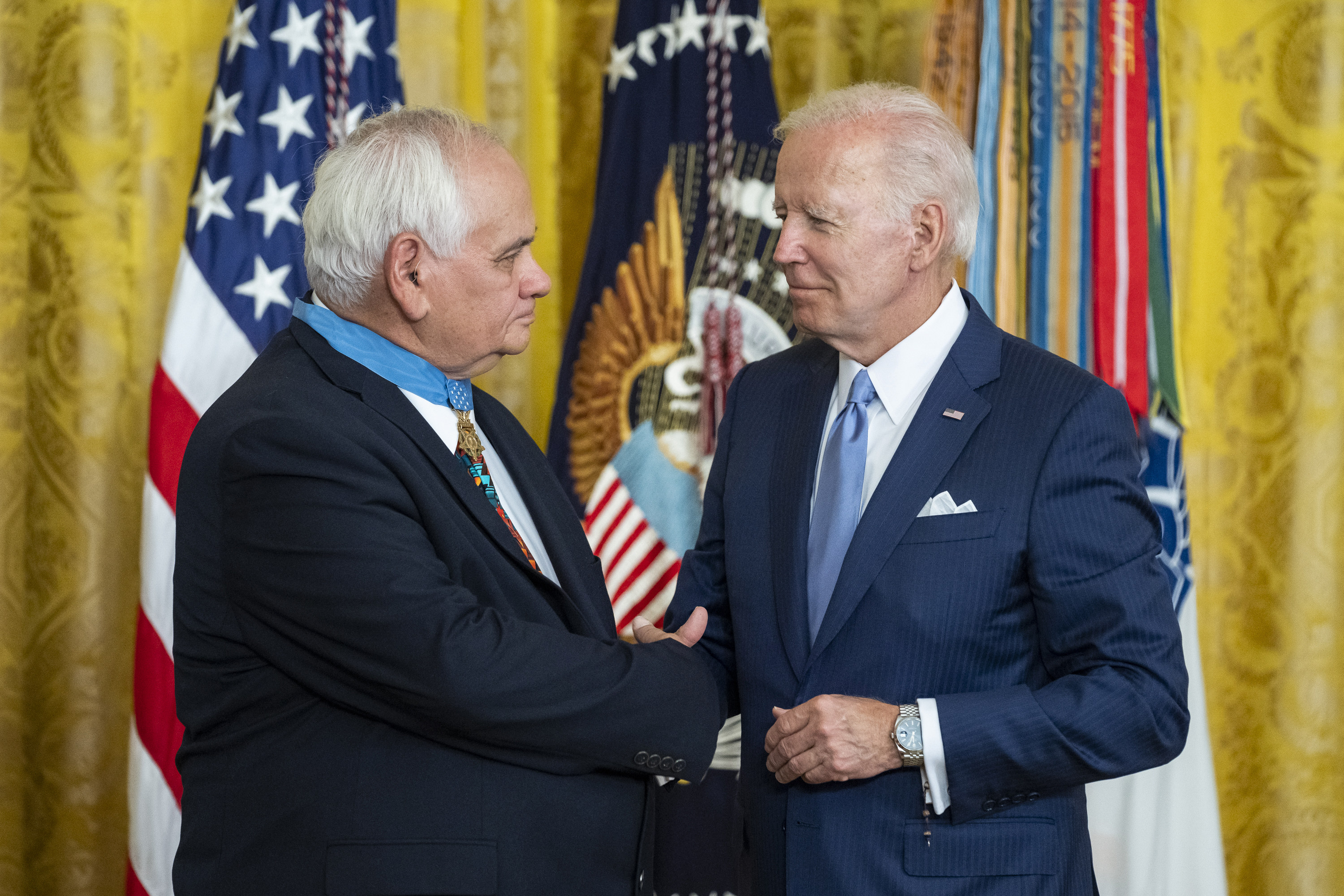
President Joe Biden awards the Medal of Honor to Birdwell in July 2022

On 27 June 2022 it was announced that President Joe Biden would present the Medal of Honor to Birdwell and three others on 5 July 2022.

Birdwell was presented with the Medal of Honor on 5 July 2022 in a ceremony at the White House.

The text of Birdwell's Medal of Honor citation reads:

Spc. 5 Dwight W. Birdwell distinguished himself by acts of gallantry and intrepidity above and beyond the call of duty while serving with Troop C, 3rd Squadron, 4th Cavalry, 25th Infantry Division, in the Republic of Vietnam on Jan. 31, 1968. On this date, a large enemy element initiated an assault on the Tan Son Nhut Airbase near Saigon. Birdwell’s unit bore the brunt of the initial attack, which resulted in the disabling or destruction of many of the unit’s vehicles and the incapacitation of his tank commander. Birdwell, under heavy enemy small-arms fire, moved the tank commander to a place of safety and assumed control of the vehicle. Realizing his tank was the first line of defense for the troop, he used its cannon, machine gun and his rifle to place effective fire on the enemy force. From the exposed position of the tank commander’s hatch, Birdwell engaged the enemy with machine gun fire and provided situation reports to his squadron commander until the communications system became damaged due to enemy fire. After having expended all of his ammunition, Birdwell dismounted and maneuvered to his squadron commander’s helicopter, which had been downed by enemy fire, and retrieved two machine guns and ammunition, with which he and a comrade suppressed the enemy. When his machine gun was hit by enemy fire and exploded, resulting in wounds to his face and torso, Birdwell refused evacuation and moved amongst the disabled vehicles and defensive positions, collecting ammunition to distribute to the remaining defenders. While under harassing fire, Birdwell led a small group of defenders past the enemy force and personally engaged the enemy with hand grenades, which disrupted their assault until reinforcements arrived. Upon receiving reinforcement, Birdwell aided in evacuating the wounded until he was ordered to seek attention for his wounds. Throughout the entire engagement, Birdwell repeatedly placed himself in extreme danger to protect his team and to defeat the enemy. His extraordinary heroism and selflessness beyond the call of duty were in keeping with the highest traditions of military service and reflect great credit upon himself, his unit and the United States Army.

== See also ==
- List of Medal of Honor recipients for the Vietnam War
