= Battle of West Saigon =

Part of the Vietnam War (1968)

- Part of May Offensive of the Vietnam War
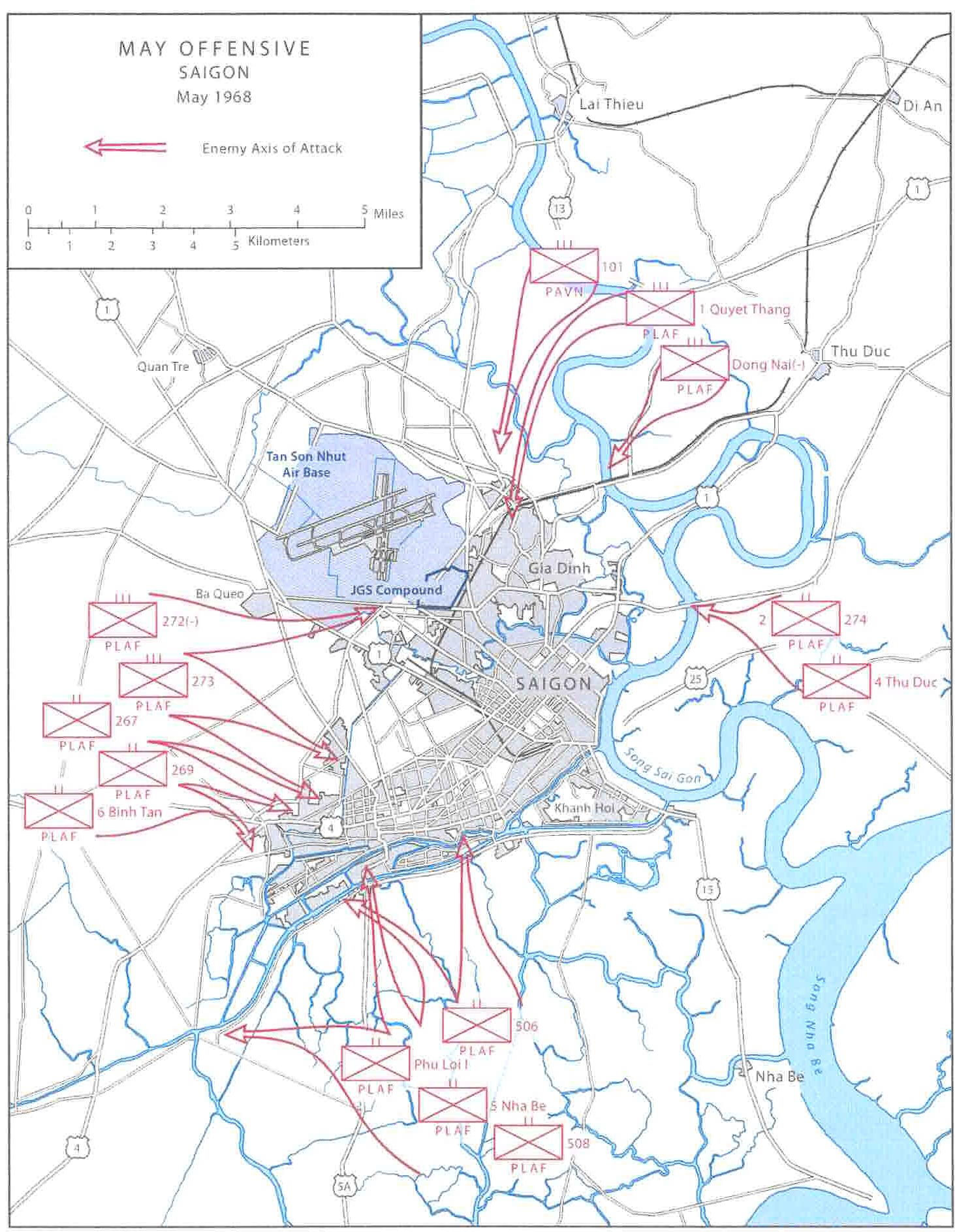
- Map of the battle
Date	5–12 May 1968
Location	Saigon, South Vietnam 10.7465°N 106.624°E
Result	Allied military victory

Belligerents
United States; South Vietnam	Viet Cong; North Vietnam

Commanders and leaders
John H. Hay; Lưu Kim Cương †	Võ Văn Hoàng †

Units involved
(United States) II Field Force 1st Infantry Division: 1st and 2nd Battalions, 28th Inf.; 1st Squadron, 4th Cav.; 199th Infantry Brigade: 3rd Battalion, 7th Inf.; 4th Battalion, 12th Inf.; Troop D, 17th Cav.; 25th Infantry Division: 1st Battalion, 5th Inf.; 4th Battalion, 9th Inf.; 4th Battalion, 23rd Inf.; 1st Battalion, 27th Inf.; 3rd Squadron, 4th Cav.; (South Vietnam) III Corps ARVN Airborne: 1st, 5th, 7th Bn.s; ARVN Rangers: 30th, 33rd, 38th Bn.s	B2 Front Sub-Region 1 (NW): 271st/9th Regiment; 272nd/9th Regiment; 88th Regiment; 101st Regiment (Q16); Sub-Region 2 (SW): 6 Bình Tân Battalion; 308th Battalion, Cửu Long Regiment; 267th Battalion; 269th Battalion; K3 Battalion, 274th Regiment (Đồng Nai) 208th Artillery Regiment

Casualties and losses
(United States) 76 killed, 1 missing (South Vietnam) 90 killed, 16 missing	US body count 2,600+ killed

The Battle of West Saigon took place from 5–12 May 1968 during the May Offensive of the Vietnam War as South Vietnamese and United States forces countered the main thrust of the offensive against the western suburbs of Saigon.

== Background ==
The second wave of the Tet general offensive began at 04:00 on 5 May with a Viet Cong (VC) mortar attack on the Newport Bridge, a two-lane concrete and steel span that conveyed traffic across the Saigon River from the capital to Biên Hòa. When the barrage ended a few minutes later, several hundred soldiers from the 4th Thu Duc Battalion and the 2nd Battalion, 274th Regiment, emerged from a nearby rubber plantation and assaulted the men from the South Vietnamese 5th Marine Battalion that were guarding the eastern end of the bridge but the assault was repulsed. The VC made a second attempt to cut Saigon off from Biên Hòa at 05:00 when elements from the 1st and 3rd Battalions of the Dong Nai Regiment attacked the Binh Loi Bridge (10.824°N 106.709°E), where Highway 1 crossed the Saigon River approximately two kilometers northwest of the Newport Bridge. Troops from the South Vietnamese 6th Marine Battalion prevented sapper teams from getting close enough to destroy the bridge with Satchel charges. The VC eventually withdrew after losing 54 killed and 5 captured. Within a few hours, both of the major bridges between Saigon and Biên Hòa were open for military traffic.

As those two attacks were taking place, a company of People’s Army of Vietnam (PAVN) soldiers from the K3 Battalion, all wearing South Vietnamese uniforms, crossed the Saigon River in sampans. Making it to the other side without being spotted, the disguised PAVN continued on foot to the Phan Thanh Gian Bridge, one of the crossing points that spanned the canal that traced the northern edge of downtown Saigon. Army of the Republic of Vietnam (ARVN) Regional Force soldiers and Marines guarding the bridge challenged the new arrivals. Unable to give the correct password, the PAVN opened fire and stormed the bridge, but the South Vietnamese repulsed the assault. When more government troops arrived on the scene, the PAVN fell back to the suburb of Thi Nghe (10.793°N 106.707°E) where they continued the fight. A few hours later, National Police commander General Nguyễn Ngọc Loan arrived with more policemen and took charge of the clearing operation. As he was leading his men a bullet struck him in the thigh. The wound nearly proved to be fatal, Loan lost his leg and the injury forced him to resign as National Police director.

As the fighting got under way on the eastern side of Saigon, II Field Force, Vietnam commander Lieutenant general Frederick C. Weyand and ARVN III Corps commander General Lê Nguyên Khang learned that the enemy had entered the western outskirts of Saigon. Ambush patrols from the ARVN 30th Ranger Battalion screening the farmlands west of Phú Thọ reported numerous VC squad and platoon-size groups moving through their sector. When fired upon, most of the VC tried to evade contact and continued moving toward the city. When the ARVN Airborne Task Force north of Tan Son Nhut Air Base and Allied forces south of the city reported little or no enemy activity, Khang concluded that the main effort was indeed originating from the west. He moved the 33rd Ranger Battalion into Phú Lâm (10.7465°N 106.624°E), three kilometers south of the 30th Ranger Battalion, to block Route 10 into Chợ Lớn and ordered the 38th Ranger Battalion to move from southern Saigon to fill the gap between Phú Lâm and Phú Thọ.

At II Field Force headquarters at Long Binh Post, Weyand ordered his deputy, Major general John H. Hay, to establish a forward command post at Camp Lê Văn Duyệt, just as MG Keith L. Ware had done during the Tet Offensive, to control the US units that would soon be fighting on the periphery of Saigon. Hay and some staff from II Field Force flew into Saigon at around 07:00 to organize Hurricane Forward, which Weyand planned to activate by the morning of 6 May.

While those preparations were under way, Weyand received word that Colonel Charles Thebaud’s 2nd Brigade, 1st Infantry Division, had engaged several enemy units between the Phu Loi and Dĩ An Base Camps. The first battle had begun when a pair of companies from the 1st Battalion, 18th Infantry Regiment, had gone to the hamlet of Tân Hiệp (10.916°N 106.768°E), three kilometers northeast of Dĩ An, to investigate a tip from local authorities about a VC ammunition dump. The troops came under heavy fire from machine guns and recoilless rifles as they tried to enter the hamlet. Thebaud dispatched two more companies of the 1/18th Infantry, along with several troops from the 1st Squadron, 4th Cavalry Regiment and Troop D, 7th Squadron, 1st Cavalry Regiment. The task force first surrounded Tân Hiệp and fought its way through the hamlet, which turned out to contain several battalions from the Dong Nai Regiment as well as support elements from the VC 5th Division. When the fighting ended that evening, the Americans had killed 260 VC and the remainder retreated from the hamlet in disorder.

The second engagement in Thebaud’s sector took place south of Phu Loi when Troops A and B from the 1/4th Cavalry, discovered several battalions from the PAVN 165th Regiment hiding in the hamlet of Xom Moi. After giving the residents a chance to flee, the province chief authorized air and artillery strikes. The bombardment lasted all day, and when the US cavalrymen and ARVN soldiers swept through the hamlet the next morning they found 500 PAVN dead in the ruins of Xom Moi, US casualties were four killed. The commander of the 165th Regiment, Colonel Phan Viet Dung, was so disheartened that he turned himself over to the Americans, telling them what he knew about COSVN’s plans.

== Battle ==
By the afternoon of 5 May, the fighting had died away on the eastern side of Saigon and there were no indications of an assault along the southern edge of the capital. North of Tan Son Nhut, the ARVN Airborne task force had skirmished with reconnaissance elements of the PAVN 101st Regiment, but those fights had been brief and the main enemy force had yet to appear. Moreover, the 2nd Brigade, 1st Infantry Division had intercepted six PAVN/VC battalions that had been headed toward the northern side of Saigon, meaning that any future thrust from that direction was likely to be relatively weak. For the moment it appeared that the main battle of the offensive was going to take place in the 5km between Tan Son Nhut and Phú Lâm, where the latest intelligence indicated that the VC 9th Division and the Cuu Long II Regiment were trying to push into the heart of Saigon. After conferring with Khang, Weyand decided to move two battalions from the 199th Infantry Brigade currently stationed near Long Binh Post to the western side of Saigon to shore up the left flank of the Ranger task force. Weyand instructed the brigade commander, Brigadier general Robert C. Forbes, to block Route 10 and Highway 4, which both entered the city through the suburb of Phú Lâm.

On the morning of 6 May, trucks from the 48th Transportation Group carried the infantrymen over the Newport Bridge and through the heart of Saigon before depositing them at their destinations. The brigade’s forward command post and the 3rd Battalion, 7th Infantry Regiment, commanded by Lieutenant colonel Kenneth W. Hall, occupied Firebase Horseshoe Bend (10.733°N 106.611°E) on the shoulder of Highway 4, two kilometres southwest of Phú Lâm, while the 4th Battalion, 12th Infantry Regiment, commanded by Lt. Col. William Mastoris Jr., manned Firebase Stephanie (10.7656°N 106.60°E) on Route 10 2km west of Phú Lâm. Six 105 mm howitzers from Battery C, 2nd Battalion, 40th Artillery Regiment, four M109 howitzers from Battery C, 2nd Battalion, 35th Artillery Regiment and mechanized Troop D, 17th Cavalry Regiment, strengthened the position at Stephanie. Forbes also regained from the 9th Infantry Division operational control of the 2nd Battalion, 3rd Infantry Regiment, commanded by Lt. Col. William C. Carper III, which operated from Firebase Smoke 10km south of Horseshoe Bend.

As soon as the 4/12th Infantry, had settled into Firebase Stephanie, located next to a Regional Forces post, Mastoris dispatched Company D to search the woods that lined Route 10 farther to the west. After moving around 200 meters, the company spotted a VC force moving east toward the city and opened fire. The firing drew in more VC, and soon Company D found itself outnumbered. Artillery fire from Firebase Stephanie and helicopter gunships from Troops C and D, 3/17th Cavalry, based at Tây Ninh Combat Base, more than evened the odds, and Mastoris soon sent another company to assist the one in contact. The fighting ebbed and surged throughout the day, with the VC repeatedly attempting to push up Route 10 toward the city. When darkness fell, at least 139 VC soldiers lay dead on the field, while US losses amounted to four killed.

When Hurricane Forward became operational at Camp Lê Văn Duyệt on the morning of 6 May, Weyand turned his attention to the other major battle that was developing in the western suburbs, a clash between the Cuu Long II Regiment and the 30th Ranger Battalion just southeast of Tan Son Nhut AB. Weyand gave Hay control over the 3rd Squadron, 4th Cavalry (minus Troop C), from the 25th Infantry Division, with instructions that he use the tanks and armored personnel carriers to support the 30th Ranger Battalion as it tried to retake a pair of hamlets, Ap Binh Long (10.782°N 106.626°E) and Ap Hoa Thanh (10.777°N 106.631°E), that the Cuu Long II Regiment had turned into makeshift fortresses. Led by Lt. Col. Glenn K. Otis, the 3/4th Cavalry, travelled south from Cu Chi Base Camp along Highway 1, reaching the air base at around 08:30 without incident. While Otis developed an attack plan with the commander of the 30th Ranger Battalion, government officials armed with loudspeakers spent several hours calling on the VC in Ap Binh Long and Ap Hoa Thanh to surrender. None did, but many civilians fled the hamlets. The Allies then doused the settlements with Tear gas, hoping to win them back without a destructive battle, but gusting winds dispersed the chemicals before they had any real effect. The cavalrymen and Rangers began their assault late in the afternoon, moving south across a field toward Ap Binh Long. The Rangers and armored vehicles faced steadily increasing fire the closer they got to the hamlet, first from mortars and recoilless rifles, and then from machine guns, small arms, and Rocket-propelled grenades (RPGs). The VC, protected by a network of makeshift bunkers and trenches they had constructed since the previous day, shrugged off the suppressive fire that the US vehicle crews attempted to lay down to cover the advance of the Rangers. Realizing the gap could not be closed without taking excessive casualties, Otis and the Ranger commander pulled their men back. Unwilling to let the VC hold a position so near to Tan Son Nhut Air Base, Khang authorized the use of air strikes and artillery to evict the Cuu Long II Regiment from Ap Binh Long and Ap Hoa Thanh.

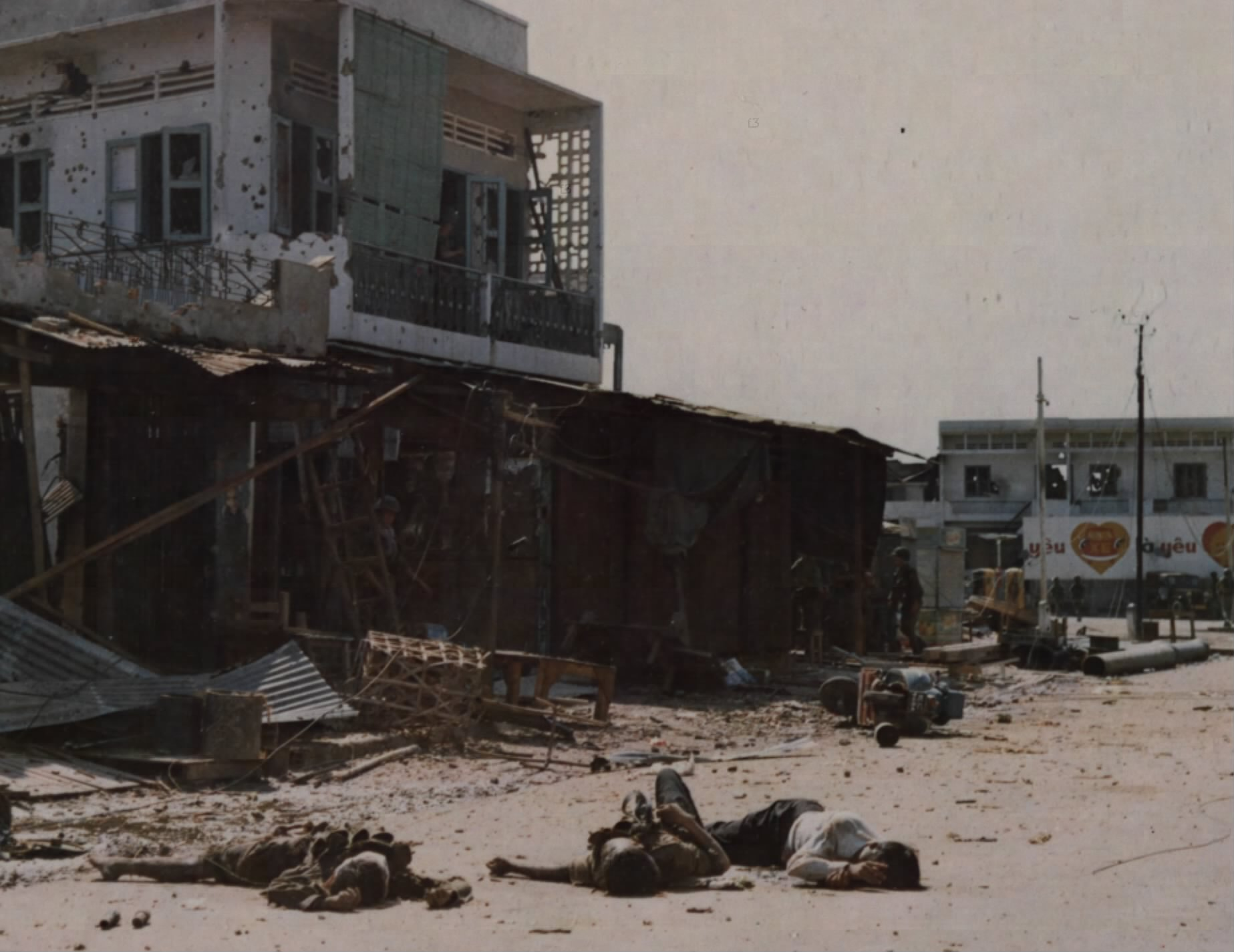
Three PAVN dead just off Plantation Road in an area which was devastated by air strikes and fires during a battle in and around the Old French Cemetery, 7 May 1968

As the fighting intensified at Ap Binh Long and Ap Hoa Thanh on the morning of 6 May, South Vietnamese officials received word that VC troops had been spotted in the old French military cemetery (10.795°N 106.654°E) just south of the main gate of Tan Son Nhut. General Cao Văn Viên ordered a company from the ARVN 7th Airborne Battalion, barracked on the southern side of the air base, to investigate. Upon reaching the cemetery, a rectangular park lined with white tombstones and surrounded by a wall of two-story shanty houses, the paratroopers discovered several dozen VC armed with light machine guns, small arms, and a few mortars. The paratroopers spent the entire day battling those troops, killing 60 with help from helicopter gunships and Republic of Vietnam Air Force (RVNAF) A-1E Skyraiders, and capturing another 11. South Vietnamese losses were light, though among the fatalities was Colonel Lưu Kim Cương, commander of both the 33rd Air Wing and the Tan Son Nhut Special Zone. The VC prisoners, all from the 9th Division, said that the cemetery had been designated as a waypoint for planned attacks on Tan Son Nhut AB, the Vietnamese Joint General Staff compound and Camp Lê Văn Duyệt.

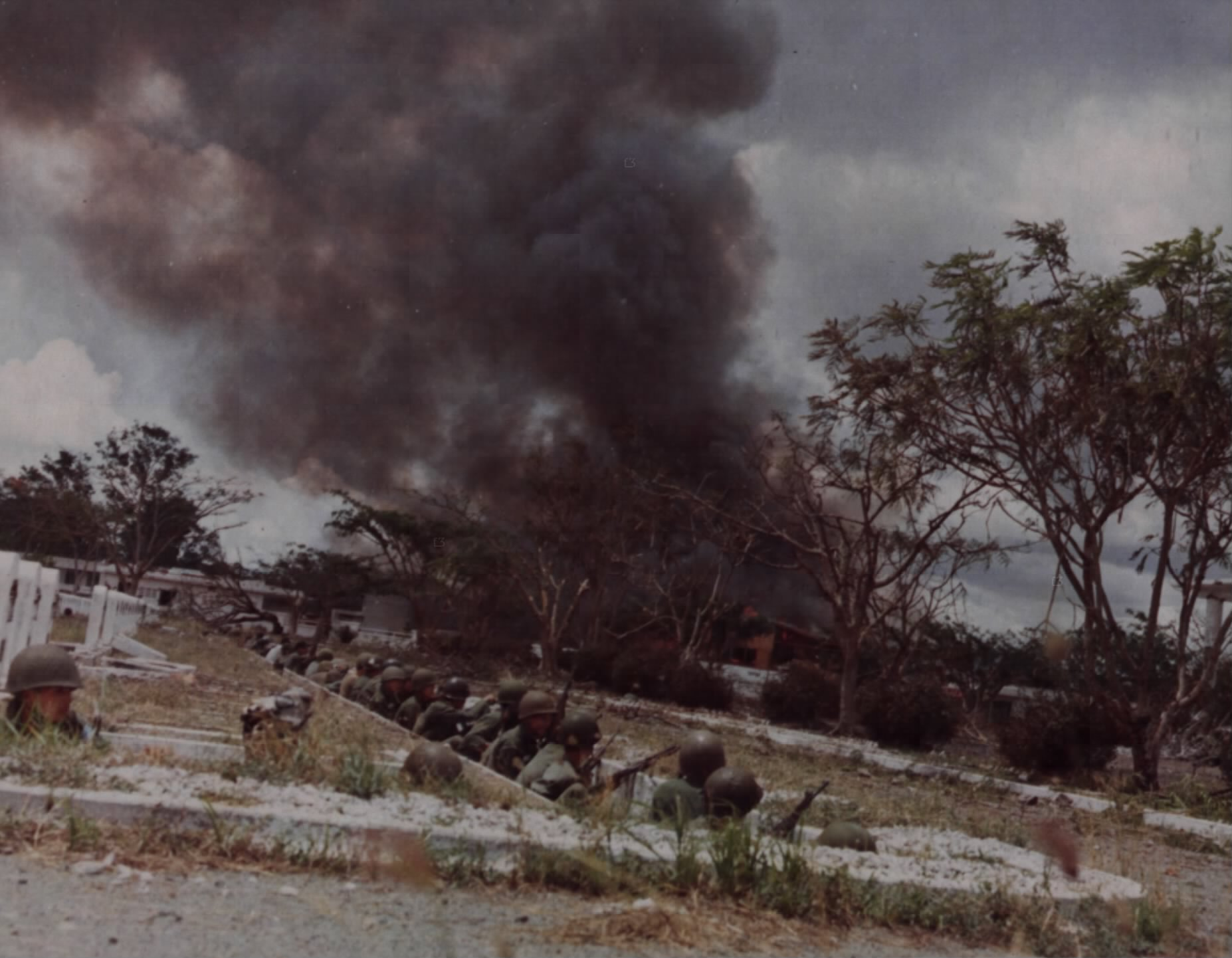
Members of the Tan Son Nhut Defense Force and the 7th Airborne Battalion pinned down by heavy enemy sniper fire in the French Cemetery, 6 May

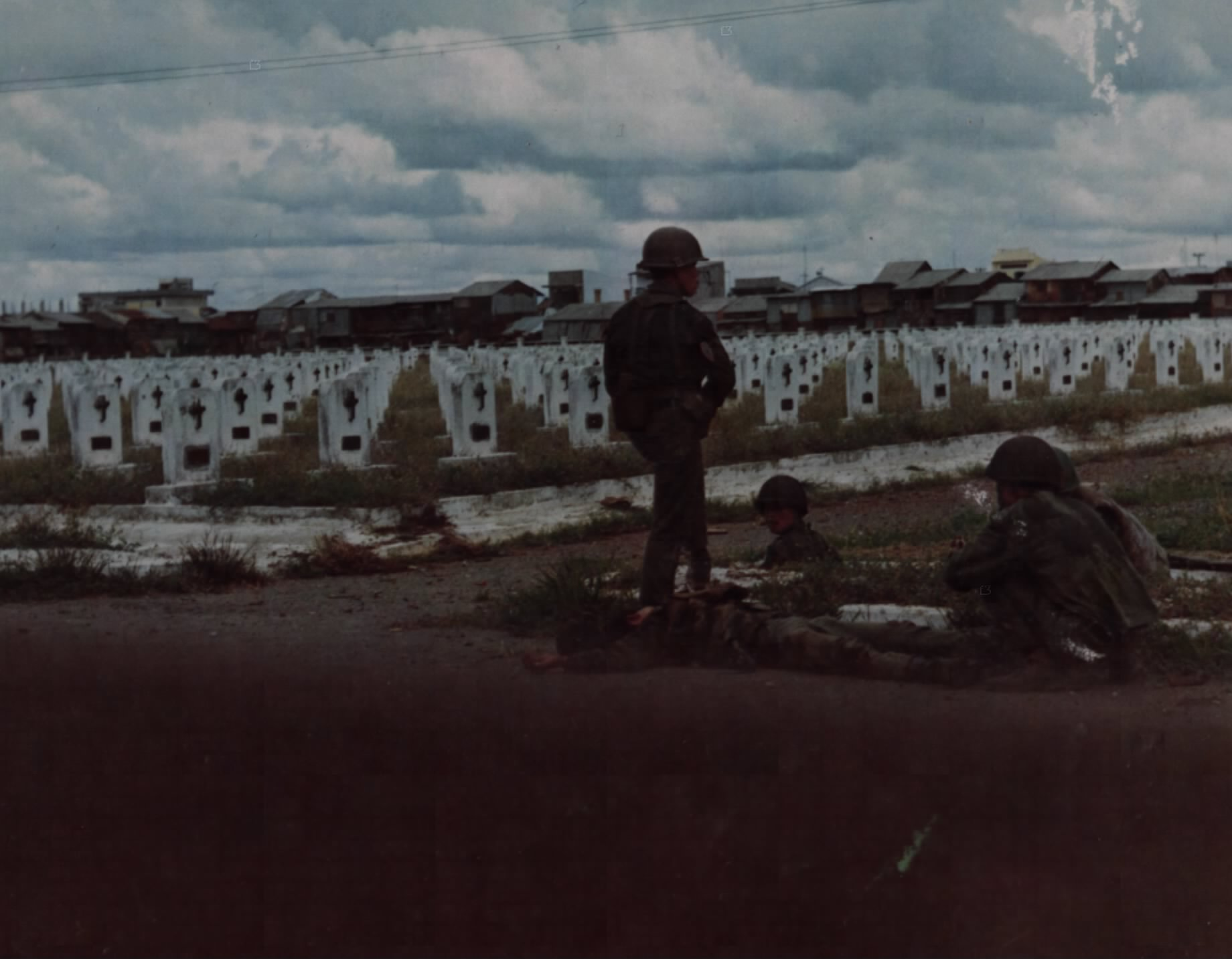
ARVN Airborne forces in the French Cemetery, 7 May

Concerned that more enemy troops might be on their way to the cemetery, Khang and Hay agreed that Ap Binh Long and Ap Hoa Thanh must be retaken the next day, so the Allies could restore the security zone around the air base. To help in that effort, Weyand gave Hay operational control over the 1st Battalion, 5th Infantry Regiment, a mechanized unit from the 25th Infantry Division stationed at Cu Chi. The battalion commander, Lt. Col. Thomas C. Lodge, brought his unit to Tan Son Nhut early in the morning where it joined up with the 3/4th Cavalry and the 30th Ranger Battalion, arrayed in attack formation just north of Ap Binh Long. On the morning of 7 May, the two battalions of US tanks and armored personnel carriers rolled forward in a line-abreast formation with Rangers screening their advance. The volume of VC fire was less intense than it had been previously, indicating that the air and artillery strikes had taken their toll on the defenders. Hostile fire knocked out one vehicle and damaged seven others, but the Allies got inside the hamlet with few casualties. Employing the firepower of the armored vehicles and the tenacity of the Rangers, the Allies outflanked the VC bunkers one by one and silenced each machine gun or recoilless rifle team within. As evening fell, the surviving VC withdrew to the adjacent hamlet of Ap Hoa Thanh, leaving behind more than 100 dead.

On the left flank of the Ranger and US mechanized units, the 199th Infantry Brigade’s 4/12th Infantry and 3/7th Infantry, maintained their blocking positions in the Phú Lâm area along Route 10 and Highway 4, respectively, despite continued efforts by the VC 9th Division to break into the city. From what Forbes could determine, at least four VC battalions had congregated in the hamlet of Bình Trị Đông (10.763°N 106.612°E) just west of the line held by the 4/12th Infantry and Troop D, 17th Cavalry. Despite its size, the 9th Division never managed to organize a large-scale and sustained attack. Artillery strikes from Firebase Stephanie and air strikes from Bien Hoa Air Base inflicted additional though uncounted casualties on the VC trapped in Bình Trị Đông. The VC’s growing disorganization became apparent later in the day when Forbes sent Company B, 4/12th Infantry and Companies A and D, 3/7th Infantry, in a wide flanking maneuver around the southern side of Binh Tri Dong to establish a block on the opposite side of the hamlet. Right before noon just after the three companies had finished preparing their new positions, a battalion from the 271st Regiment came marching down Route 10 oblivious to the danger. The US soldiers opened fire at close range. Startled, the VC broke formation and headed north into a wooded area after having lost 44 of their number killed; two Americans died in the brief firefight. When night fell, the 199th Infantry Brigade’s blocking forces remained firmly ensconced on either side of Bình Trị Đông.

Also on 7 May units from the 1st and 25th Infantry Divisions had intercepted several VC battalions outside the capital. Approximately 5km south of Dĩ An Base Camp, elements from the 1st and the 2nd Battalions, 28th Infantry Regiment, killed some 95 soldiers from the K3 Battalion, Dong Nai Regiment, the unit that had been responsible for the attack on the Binh Loi and Phan Tan Gian Bridges on 5 May. On the opposite side of Saigon, Companies A and B of the 1st Battalion, 27th Infantry Regiment and Troop C, 3/4th Cavalry, engaged the PAVN 3rd Battalion, 88th Regiment, a few kilometers southwest of Hóc Môn District, killing a reported 199 PAVN, including the battalion commander and his entire staff. Several kilometers to the south in the countryside just west of Tan Son Nhut, Company C, 1/27th Infantry and elements of the 4th Battalion, 9th Infantry Regiment, took turns attacking a battalion from the 271st Regiment, killing 100 VC over the course of two days.

By the morning of 8 May, all of the intelligence available to Weyand and Khang indicated that the VC’s western thrust against Saigon had failed. Although soldiers from the Cuu Long II Regiment and the 9th Division were still fighting in the sector west of Phú Thọ and Phú Lâm, they were no longer trying to reach the city; most were hunkered down in defensive positions and some were beginning to retreat. The most visible sign of progress came late that afternoon when the 30th Ranger Battalion and the 3/4th Cavalry, regained the hamlet of Ap Thanh Hoa, killing a rearguard force of some 50 VC that had stayed behind to cover the withdrawal of the Cuu Long II Regiment’s headquarters. As for the 9th Division battalions farther to the south in the hamlet of Bình Trị Đông, those units remained pinned in place by the 4/12th Infantry and the 3/7th Infantry. Subjected to incessant bombing and shelling for the last several days, some of the 9th Division battalions were no longer combat effective. The 4th Battalion, 272nd Regiment, for example, now had 43 men fit for duty out of an original complement of some 500 soldiers. When his subordinates reported their predicament, 9th Division commander General Thai gave them permission to withdraw from the Bình Trị Đông pocket. To assist the breakout, COSVN organized several diversionary attacks. In the first, the Sub-Region 1 command north of Saigon directed the PAVN 101st Regiment to assault Tan Son Nhut in the early morning hours of 9 May. After finding its way blocked by the ARVN 5th Airborne Battalion 4km north of Tan Son Nhut and just west of the Quang Trung Infantry Center (10.842°N 106.644°E), the 101st Regiment attacked. The PAVN began their assault with a concentrated barrage of RPGs that knocked the defenders back on their heels. PAVN soldiers got within fifty meters of the ARVN command post before the paratroopers steadied their line. The tide of battle soon turned in favor of the South Vietnamese when reinforcements from the ARVN 1st and 7th Airborne Battalions arrived led by the commander of the Airborne Division, Maj. Gen. Dư Quốc Đống. He organized a defensive line that stymied all efforts by the 101st Regiment to penetrate or outflank the position. The fighting continued all day and into the night. When it ended on the morning of 10 May, a few dozen survivors from the 101st Regiment retreated north, leaving behind nearly 300 of their dead or badly wounded, while the ARVN had lost 17 dead and 52 wounded.

COSVN initiated a second diversion on the morning of 9 May, this one to open an escape route through Hậu Nghĩa Province. The command ordered Sub-Region 2 to attack Firebase Maury (10.884°N 106.476°E), an outpost that the commander of the 25th Infantry Division, General Fillmore K. Mearns, had just established in Đức Hòa District approximately 9km south of Cu Chi, and which stood squarely in the path of retreat that the 9th Division intended to use. Manning the post were Companies A and B, 4th Battalion, 23rd Infantry Regiment, Troop I, 3rd Squadron, 11th Armored Cavalry Regiment and artillery made up of the towed 105 mm howitzers from Batteries B and C of the 7th Battalion, 11th Artillery Regiment and the M109 howitzers of Battery A, 3rd Battalion, 13th Artillery Regiment. To assist the assault, Sub-Region 2 headquarters instructed elements from the 208th Artillery Regiment to rocket the 25th Infantry Division’s base camp at Cu Chi. At 01:00 on 9 May, PAVN artillery crews sent a salvo of 30 rockets crashing into Cu Chi, killing seven Americans and wounding 48 others. An hour later, PAVN infantry assaulted Firebase Maury from the north and from the south in battalion strength. While the defenders were preoccupied with these attacks, a team of sappers used some encroaching woodlands to reach the western portion of the perimeter undetected. After cutting their way through the wire, the sappers destroyed five M109 howitzers and two ammunition trucks with satchel charges before slipping back out of the perimeter. When the shooting stopped a few hours later, 10 Americans were dead and another 66 wounded. The PAVN left behind 18 dead. The troops at Firebase Maury spent the better part of the day clearing away destroyed equipment.

The beleaguered 9th Division units at Bình Trị Đông exploited the diversions on the morning of 9 May to make their escape. VC soldiers crept out of the bunkers and spider holes that had kept them alive during the last five days and began marching west in small groups, leaving behind a great deal of equipment and most of their dead in order to travel quickly. The VC showed their usual efficiency in slipping past the US troops positioned along Route 10 west of the village. When the sun came up, ARVN engineers moved in to disable any booby traps the VC might have left behind and to bury the 277 dead VC they found in the rubble.

Over the next few days, Allied units to the west of Saigon continued to engage small groups of withdrawing PAVN/VC. The three Ranger battalions west of Phú Thọ and Tan Son Nhut killed a reported 87 VC on 10 May and another 101 the next day. Farther west in the swamplands that lay on the border of Gia Định and Hậu Nghĩa Provinces, the 4/9th Infantry, killed several dozen soldiers from the retreating 9th Division, while the 1/27th Infantry, mauled an element of the 208th Artillery Regiment, killing 66 gunners and capturing three 122 mm rocket launchers. In the 199th Infantry Brigade sector to the south, the 4/12th Infantry, completed its sweep of the Route 10 corridor west of Phú Lâm, while the 2/3rd Infantry, cleared out the last VC diehards along the edge of the city south of Highway 4 and to the east of Firebase Horseshoe Bend, killing 16 VC on 11 May.

To expedite clearing operations in western Gia Định Province, Mearns ordered the 4/9th Infantry, to establish a firebase approximately 4km west of Tan Son Nhut next to Route 234, a north-south road that crossed the enemy’s line of retreat. As Firebase Pike VI (10.8°N 106.583°E) took shape on the morning of 11 May, Mearns moved two batteries of 105 mm howitzers and a battery of M109 howitzers into the perimeter. Mindful of the recent disaster at Maury, Mearns also sent engineers to construct earthen walls for all three batteries before evening fell. The preparations paid off later that night when the PAVN/VC bombarded the firebase with several hundred rounds of 82 mm mortar fire. None of the howitzers were knocked out of action and the defenders sustained only light casualties. When the barrage ended, a battalion from the 272nd Regiment assaulted the base. Facing a storm of fire that included Beehive anti-personnel rounds from the 105 mm howitzers that filled the air with steel darts, the PAVN withdrew after losing 110 men. The failed assault on Firebase Pike VI proved to be the last major contact in the western suburbs as the fighting thereafter gravitated into Hậu Nghĩa and Tây Ninh Provinces.

In that same period between 9 and 12 May, the VC units that had entered areas to the north and to the east of Saigon made their own escape from the Capital Military District. Before retreating, soldiers belonging to Sub-Regions 4 and 5 tried again on four separate occasions to destroy the Binh Loi (10.825°N 106.71°E) and Newport Bridges. The final attack that took place on the morning of 12 May was the most successful. Gunners from the 4th Thu Duc Battalion scored a direct hit on the Newport Bridge with a recoilless rifle, sending a chunk of steel-reinforced concrete almost sixty meters long and half the width of the bridge crashing into the river. The VC then promptly packed up his weapons and hustled away before helicopter gunships could retaliate. For the Allies, the damage inflicted on the bridge proved to be little more than an inconvenience. The temporary loss of one lane did not seriously impede traffic, and over the next four weeks engineers repaired the otherwise intact bridge.

== Aftermath ==
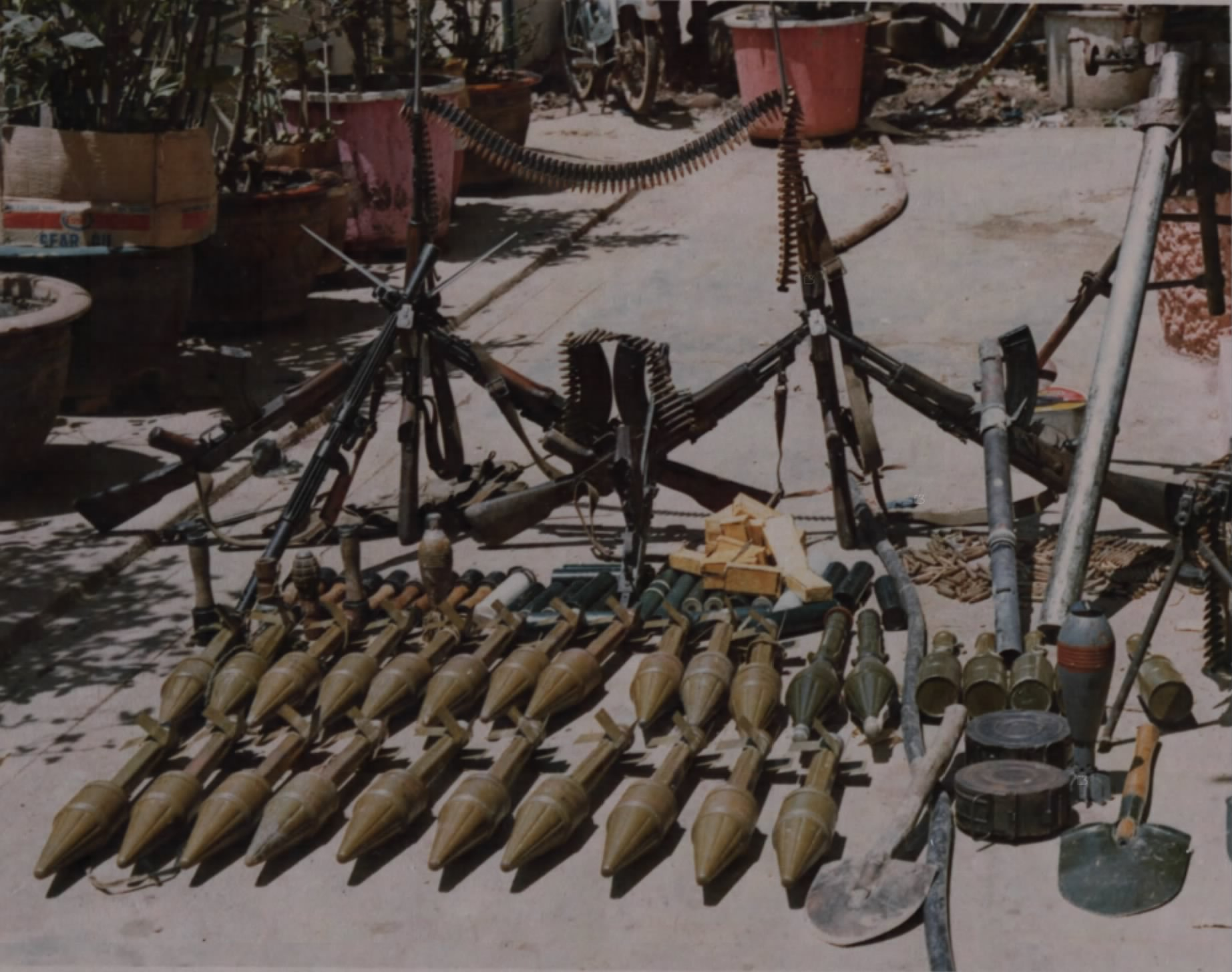
Weapons captured in the fighting at the French Cemetery

PAVN/VC losses exceeded 2,600 killed in the fighting west and north of Saigon. PAVN/VC losses in and around Saigon between 5 and 13 May amounted to 3,058 dead and 221 captured. Among the dead was the deputy commander of Sub-Region 2, Col. Võ Văn Hoàng, who had led the 6th Bình Tân Battalion and the 308th Battalion into Saigon.

ARVN losses were 90 dead and 16 missing while US losses were 76 dead and 1 missing.
