= Lưu Kim Cương =

South Vietnamese brigadier general

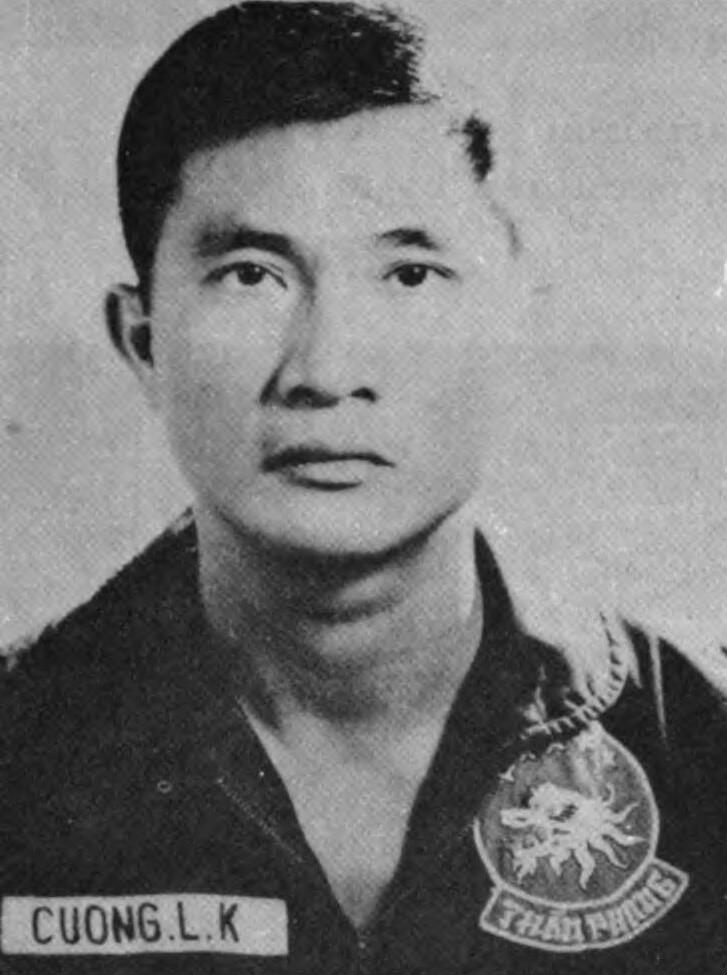
- Died: 1968
- Military career
- Allegiance: South Vietnam
- Branch: Republic of Vietnam Air Force
- Rank: Colonel (Brigadier General, posthumously)
- Commands: 33rd Air Wing; Tan Son Nhut Special Zone
- Conflicts: Vietnam War: Tet Offensive attack on Tan Son Nhut Air Base; Battle of West Saigon

Lưu Kim Cương was a South Vietnam Air Force (VNAF) Air Wing commander, who was killed in action in the May Offensive 1968. He commanded the 33rd Air Wing and the Tan Son Nhut Special Zone in the Tet Offensive attack on Tan Son Nhut Air Base, and then the Battle of West Saigon

== Military career ==
In the Tet Offensive attack on Tan Son Nhut Air Base, Lieu. Col. Cương brought his reserve force, around one hundred security personnel and four M41 light tanks, out to meet the Viet Cong (VC) three-battalion force (D16, 267th, 296th) on the western side of Tan Son Nhut Air Base. As he led his troops forward, a bullet struck him in the leg. Though the wound was serious, Cương refused to leave the battle at such a critical juncture.

In the Battle of West Saigon, South Vietnamese losses were light, though among the fatalities was Col. Lưu Kim Cương, commander of both the 33rd Air Wing and the Tan Son Nhut Special Zone.
