= Crosbie E. Saint =

United States Army general

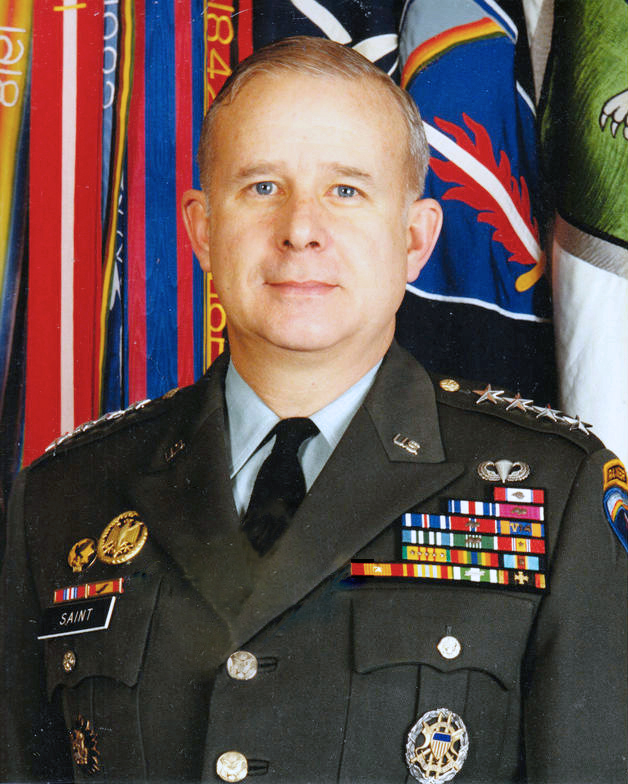
- General Crosbie Saint
- Born: 29 September 1936; West Point, New York, U.S.
- Died: 7 May 2018 (aged 81); Bethesda, Maryland, U.S.
- Military career
- Allegiance: United States
- Branch: United States Army
- Service years: 1958–1992
- Rank: General
- Commands: United States Army Europe; III Corps; 1st Armored Division; 11th Armored Cavalry Regiment
- Conflicts: Vietnam War
- Awards: Defense Distinguished Service Medal; Army Distinguished Service Medal (3); Silver Star; Legion of Merit (3); Distinguished Flying Cross; Bronze Star Medal (3)
- Other work: Consultant

Crosbie Edgerton Saint (29 September 1936 – 7 May 2018) was a United States Army four-star general who served as Commander in Chief, United States Army Europe/Commander, Central Army Group from 1988 to 1992.

== Military career ==
Saint was born at West Point, New York, on 29 September 1936. He was the son of a career soldier, Lieutenant Colonel Frederick Saint, who commanded the 14th Engineer Regiment (PS), a combat engineer unit of the Philippine Scouts of the United States Army, at Fort William McKinley, the Philippine Islands, in the early 1940s. Frederick Saint perished while he was a prisoner of war of the Imperial Japanese Army, following the mass surrender of the Fil-American forces on the Bataan peninsula in April 1942.

The junior Saint graduated from the United States Military Academy in 1958, receiving his commission in Armor.

Saint served two tours in Vietnam, and had five tours with United States Army Europe. His commands included the 11th Armored Cavalry Regiment; Seventh Army Training Command; 1st Armored Division; and III Corps and Fort Hood, Texas.

In 1987 Saint successfully inaugurated AH-64 helicopters into the battle order of the US Army as fully active features in his plans.

Saint led the United States Army Europe as 27th Commander from 24 June 1988 to 9 July 1992.

He retired from the army on 1 September 1992.

Saint's military and civilian education included the Armed Forces Staff College, Army War College, and a Master of Arts degree in International Relations from American University.

=== Select publications ===
- "Fire Support in Mobile Armored Warfare" (PDF). Field Artillery Journal: 12–14. June 1988.
- "Attack Helicopter Operations in the AirLand Battle: Close Operations". Military Review. LXVIII (6): 2–15. June 1988a. ISSN 0026-4148.
- "Attack Helicopter Operations in the AirLand Battle: Deep Operations". Military Review. LXVIII (7): 2–9. July 1988b. ISSN 0026-4148. Also available at Google Books.
- "Attack Helicopter Operations in the AirLand Battle: Rear Operations". Military Review. LXVIII (10): 2–10. October 1988c. ISSN 0026-4148.
- "A CINC's view of operational art". Military Review. LXVIII (10): 65–78. September 1990. ISSN 0026-4148. Available online.

=== Criticism ===
In 1985 General Saint, then III Corps Commander at Fort Hood, formed the first consolidated AH-64 attack helicopter brigade at corps level and broke new ground in developing methods of conducting deep operations, based on the Intelligence Preparation of the Battlefield (IPB) concept. General Saint assigned missions to attack helicopter units "to disrupt or destroy enemy forces to a depth of 150 kilometers as the enemy repositions for integration into the close battle." He integrated long range indirect fires, EW assets, and BAl sorties into the deep attack whenever possible. Attack helicopter units conducting deep operations became an integral part of the ground commander's scheme of maneuver to shape the battlefield AH-64 units conducted deep attack missions at night to maximize the aircraft's capabilities and take advantage of the enemy's lack of night fighting technology. The attack helicopter units truly became, in Clausewltz's words, "a small group of skillful raiders." The success of the deep battle provided a crucial link to fulfill AirLand Battle doctrine.

== Post-military ==
After retiring from the military, Saint established a consulting firm specializing in foreign relations and national security issues. He also served on the Army Science Board, was vice president, Europe for Military Professional Resources, and at one time sat on the advisory board for the Jewish Institute for National Security Affairs, and the DRS Technologies Board of Directors. He previously served as chairman, for the Vice President's National Performance Review on Intelligence Support to the Ground Forces. Saint died of congestive heart failure on May 7, 2018, in Bethesda, Maryland at the age of 81.

== Personal life ==
Saint married and later divorced Virginia Carnahan. He later married Merrilyn Crosgrove. Saint was buried with Full Military Honors on 14 May 2018 at Section: 34, Grave: 654-A Arlington National Cemetery.

Military offices
Preceded by Glenn K. Otis	Commanding General of United States Army Europe; 1988–1992	Succeeded by David M. Maddox
